= List of hills in the North Pennines =

This is a list of hills in the North Pennines. To avoid the list becoming infinitely long and arbitrary, only hills with more than 30 m relative height are included. This includes all Marilyns and Hewitts as well as many other hills.

Topographically, the boundaries of the North Pennines trace the flow of streams from the lowest points between it and the neighbouring regions of the Lake District, Cheviots and Yorkshire Dales. This gives the boundaries as, primarily, the River Eden, River Tyne, River Tees and River Greta (from Stainmore Gap). This list therefore includes all hills to the east of the North Pennines including the low hills of County Durham.

Hills are grouped as topographically as possible, according to their 'parent Marilyn'. The parent Marilyn of hill A can be found by dividing the nearby area into territories, by tracing the runoff from the key col of each Marilyn. The parent is the Marilyn whose territory hill A resides in. Marilyns are given in bold.

In the table headers, H stands for height and RH for relative height.

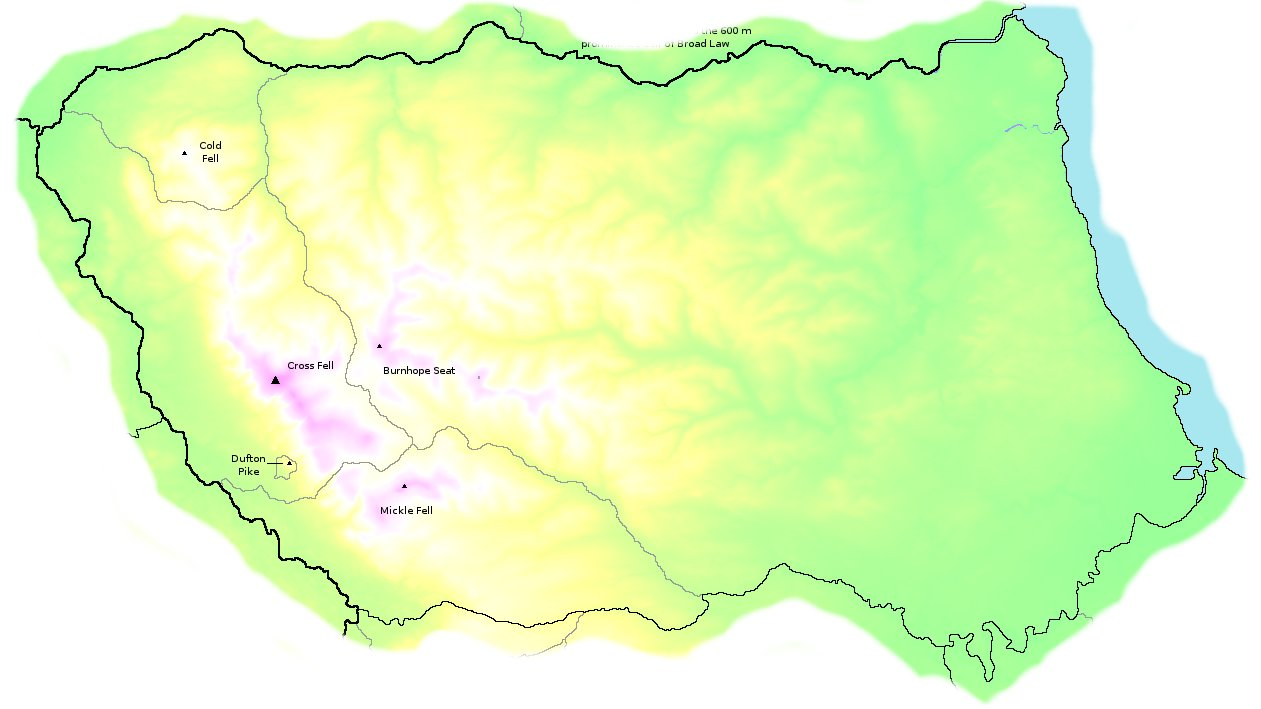

ID	Hill	H	RH	Grid ref.
CRF-1	**Cross Fell**	893	651	NY687343
CRF-2	Great Dun Fell	848	76	NY710321
CRF-3	Little Dun Fell	842	61	NY704330
CRF-4	Knock Fell	794	48	NY721302
CRF-5	Meldon Hill	767	65	NY771290
CRF-6	Melmerby Fell	709	43	NY652380
CRF-7	Round Hill	686	c 71	NY744361
CRF-8	Black Fell	664	89	NY648444
CRF-9	Grey Nag	656	c 40	NY644476
CRF-10	Thack Moor	609	c 57	NY611463
CRF-11	Watch Hill	604	c 30	NY624460
CRF-12	Blotting Raise	591	c 67	NY597495
CRF-13	Cuns Fell	539	c 33	NY648368
CRF-14	Brownber Hill	519	c 37	NY706275
CRF-15	Park Fell	511	c 37	NY697455
CRF-16	Cumrew Fell	483	c 120	NY564520
CRF-17	Little Heaplaw	438	30	NY686491
CRF-18	Burney Hill	426	c 58	NY684301
CRF-19	Flagdaw	414	c 33	NY691289
CRF-20	Knock Pike	398	c 101	NY686282
CRF-21	Catterpallot Hill	383	c 41	NY638363
CRF-22	Keisley Bank	351	c 45	NY713240
CRF-23	Harthwaite	329	c 30	NY710245
CRF-24	Scales Rigg	261	c 53	NY579434
CRF-25	Lawson Hill	243	c 65	NY538485
CRF-26	Whin Fell	c 226	c 39	NY560439
CRF-27	Ruckcroft Hill	c 225	c 42	NY534446
CRF-28	Maughanby Moor	182	c 34	NY577380

ID	Hill	H	RH	Grid ref.
MKF-1	**Mickle Fell**	788	c 210	NY804243
MKF-2	Little Fell	748	c 73	NY781222
MKF-3	Murton Fell	675	74	NY753245
MKF-4	Bink Moss	619	43	NY875243
MKF-5	Murton Pike	594	72	NY735231
MKF-6	Roman Fell	594	60	NY754203
MKF-7	Iron Band	563	c 80	NY837188
MKF-8	Great Knipe	516	c 73	NY867145
MKF-9	Mount Ida	449	c 31	NY795166
MKF-10	Millstone Grits	410	c 56	NY955217
MKF-11	Barnarm Scar	371	c 45	NY793162
MKF-12	Kilmond Scars	311	c 37	NZ026134
MKF-13	Brough Hill	193	c 30	NY765156
MKF-14	Thorny Hill	191	c 35	NY774142
MKF-15	Gale Hill	c 186	c 36	NY694205
MKF-16	Great Musgrave Hill	181	c 33	NY769134
MKF-17	Huber Hill	180	c 32	NY754147
MKF-18	Vicarage Bank	177	c 30	NY742159

ID	Hill	H	RH	Grid ref.
CDF-1	**Cold Fell**	621	168	NY605556
CDF-2	Simmerson Hill	400	62	NY576560
CDF-3	Talkin Fell	381	32	NY570563
CDF-4	Whinny Fell	336	c 52	NY570574
CDF-5	Tortie Hill	296	c 37	NY591581
CDF-6	Blenkinsopp Common	289	85	NY641635
CDF-7	Willowford Hill	172	c 34	NY622660
CDF-8	The Crews	139	c 32	NY532585

ID	Hill	H	RH	Grid ref.
DTP-1	**Dufton Pike**	481	163	NY699266

ID	Hill	H	RH	Grid ref.
BHS-1	**Burnhope Seat**	747	190	NY785375
BHS-2	Dead Stones	710	33	NY793399
BHS-3	Great Stony Hill	708	c 54	NY823359
BHS-4	Chapelfell Top	703	142	NY875346
BHS-5	James's Hill	675	67	NY923325
BHS-6	Killhope Law	673	48	NY819448
BHS-7	Three Pikes	651	30	NY833343
BHS-8	Viewing Hill	649	66	NY788332
BHS-9	Flinty Fell	614	43	NY770419
BHS-10	The Dodd	614	c 31	NY791457
BHS-11	Burtree Fell	612	c 38	NY862432
BHS-12	Alston Moor	580	c 37	NY750437
BHS-13	Dry Rigg	566	33	NY907448
BHS-14	Hard Rigg	546	c 45	NY750488
BHS-15	Bolt's Law	540	c 33	NY950454
BHS-16	Brownley Hill	533	31	NY803507
BHS-17	Pike Rigg	525	c 55	NY730539
BHS-18	Ayle Common	524	c 48	NY724510
BHS-19	Horseshoe Hill	519	c 36	NY985449
BHS-20	Collier Law	516	c 76	NZ016418
BHS-21	Islington Hill	492	c 45	NZ002298
BHS-22	Grey Carrs	461	c 48	NZ013251
BHS-23	Lilswood Moor	447	64	NY891527
BHS-24	Hope Fell	427	c 73	NY926505
BHS-25	Catterick Moss	426	c 30	NY992359
BHS-26	Dine Holm Scar	414	44	NY868284
BHS-27	Catton Beacon	337	34	NY822592
BHS-28	Pontop Pike	312	c 115	NZ150528
BHS-29	Cragg Top	311	c 33	NZ074240
BHS-30	Billy Hill	308	c 34	NZ155382
BHS-31	Greymare Hill	295	32	NZ045552
BHS-32	Cornsay Hill	279	c 36	NZ141430
BHS-33	Humber Hill	270	c 52	NZ141465
BHS-34	Woolley Hill	267	c 34	NZ181395
BHS-35	Wheatley Hill	c 261	c 32	NZ192494
BHS-36	Currock Hill	259	c 102	NZ107592
BHS-37	Greenland Bank	c 234	c 40	NZ187435
BHS-38	Blackmoor Hill	c 227	c 39	NZ194578
BHS-39	Brusselton Hill	226	c 72	NZ205249
BHS-40	Burdon Moor	216	c 43	NZ220578
BHS-41	Mickley Moor	208	34	NZ081609
BHS-42	Barnard Castle Hill	c 207	c 30	NZ063170
BHS-43	Westerton Hill	203	c 61	NZ240311
BHS-44	Strawberry Hill	193	c 110	NZ346392
BHS-45	Snokoe Hill	191	62	NY983621
BHS-46	Catley Hill	183	c 51	NZ361343
BHS-47	Raisby Hill	c 182	c 39	NZ352353
BHS-48	Findon Hill	c 181	c 50	NZ244466
BHS-49	Warden Law	172	c 53	NZ363508
BHS-50	Lily Hill	c 169	c 35	NZ366435
BHS-51	Sheriff Hill	167	c 134	NZ269602
BHS-52	Cobbler’s Hill	163	c 44	NZ337454
BHS-53	Whangdon Hill	c 156	c 33	NZ439340
BHS-54	Penshaw Hill	136	c 52	NZ333543
BHS-55	Whinny Hill	c 114	c 37	NZ325222
BHS-56	Tunstall Hills	112	c 64	NZ391544
BHS-57	Boldon Hills	c 93	c 59	NY350602
BHS-58	Beacon Hill	83	c 60	NY394639

== See also ==
- List of hills in the Lake District
- List of hills in the Yorkshire Dales
- List of hills in the Peak District
