= Mickle Fell =

Mountain in northern England

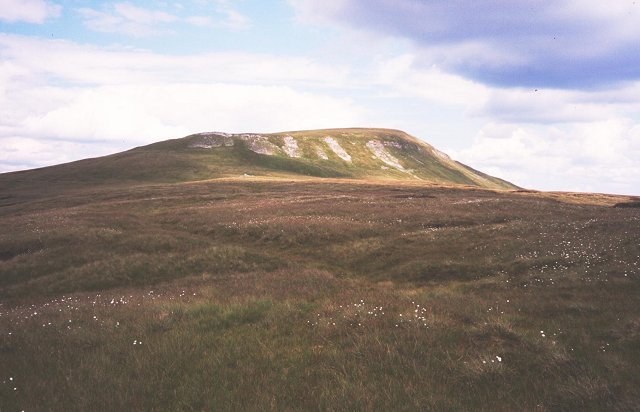
- Western side of Mickle Fell

Highest point
- Elevation: 788 m (2,585 ft)
- Prominence: c. 210 metres (690 ft)
- Parent peak: Cross Fell
- Listing: Marilyn, Hewitt, County Top, Nuttall
- Coordinates: 54°36′56″N 2°18′08″W

Geography
- Location within County Durham
- Location: Pennines, England
- OS grid: NY804243
- Topo map: OS Landrangers 91, 92

Mickle Fell is a mountain in the Pennines, the range of hills and moors running down the middle of Northern England. It has a maximum elevation of 788 m (2,585 ft). It lies slightly off the main watershed of the Pennines, about 10 miles (16 kilometres) south of Cross Fell. After Cross Fell, Mickle Fell is the highest Marilyn within the North Pennines designated Area of Outstanding Natural Beauty (AONB).

It is the highest point within the historic county of Yorkshire. It is part of southern Teesdale, which was transferred from the North Riding of Yorkshire to County Durham for administrative and ceremonial purposes under the Local Government Act 1972 (taking effect in 1974). It is thus also the highest point within the current unitary council area of Durham. The highest point in historic County Durham is Burnhope Seat between Teesdale and Weardale.

The name of Mickle Fell comes from the Old Norse word mikill meaning great and fell (or fjall) meaning mountain or hill.

The fell lies in the middle of a large area of boggy moorland and requires a long hike to get to it from any direction. Mickle Fell's distinctive outline makes it a recognisable object in views from the Lake District hills, particularly Blencathra, the Helvellyn range, and High Street. South of Mickle Fell the ridge descends to the Stainmore Gap before rising again into the Yorkshire Dales.

Mickle Fell and surrounding moorland forms part of the Warcop Training Area, a Ministry of Defence firing range. As a result, public access to the fell is limited and it is not visited by hillwalkers as often as other well-known summits, despite its importance. It can be ascended from the Eden Valley to the west, or from Teesdale to the east.

Marilyns are rare in the North Pennines because of the relative flatness of the moors, but Mickle Fell is one such hill: it is separated from its neighbours by over 200 m of relative height.

== Access ==
Mickle Fell and surrounding moorland forms part of the Warcop Training Area, a Ministry of Defence firing range. As a result, public access to the fell is limited and it is not visited by hillwalkers as often as other well-known summits, despite its importance. It can be ascended from the Eden Valley to the west, or from Teesdale to the east.

== View ==
John Marius Wilson wrote of Mickle Fell in the 1870s that it "commands a very extensive view". It is possible to see the Forest of Bowland in Lancashire, the Lakeland Fells including Scafell Pike and even the Galloway Hills.

- N-NE: Killhope Law (3.4°, 12.6m), The Cheviot (5.8°, 60.0m), Tosson Hill (14.8°, 47.4m), Chapelfell Top (34.2°, 7.7m)
- E-SE: Gisborough Moor (98.1°, 51.9m), Urra Moor (106.0°, 51.0m), Black Hambleton (113.7°, 45.9m), Hoove (130.8°, 16.3m)
- SE-S: Rogan's Seat (152.0°, 15.1m), Great Whernside (158.6°, 33.7m), Buckden Pike (161.1°, 30.0m), Lovely Seat (165.9°, 18.9m), Great Shunner Fell (170.9°, 17.2m), Fountains Fell (173.5°, 33.1m), Dodd Fell Hill (174.8°, 24.9m), Penyghent (176.2°, 31.9m)
- S-SW: High Seat (180.8°, 14.5m), Great Knoutberry Hill (182.4°, 23.2m), Ingleborough (187.2°, 31.3m), Whernside (188.6°, 27.0m), Wild Boar Fell (190.4°, 16.3m), Great Coum (194.2°, 26.3m), Ward's Stone (197.8°, 43.0m), Calf Top (199.8°, 25.7m), The Calf (206.4°, 19.1m), Fell Head (210.5°, 19.1m), Carnedd Llewelyn (214.8°, 121.6m), Grayrigg Forest (219.7°, 20.1m)
- SW-W: Little Fell (228.4°, 2.1m), Gummer's How (228.8°, 34.2m), Black Combe (239.5°, 48.3m), Tarn Crag (242.1°, 22.3m), Old Man of Coniston (243.1°, 37.1m), Harter Fell (Mardale) (246.0°, 23.5m), High Street (249.6°, 24.1m), Crinkle Crags (250.3°, 36.8m), High Raise (Martindale) (252.5°, 23.3m), Scafell Pike (253.4°, 38.4m), Fairfield (253.8°, 28.9m), Helvellyn (258.3°, 29.5m), Great Dodd (264.8°, 29.0m), Grasmoor (266.0°, 39.3m), Grisedale Pike (267.9°, 37.8m)
- W-NW: Murton Fell (270.8°, 3.3m), Great Mell Fell (270.9°, 25.4m), Lord's Seat (271.7°, 37.4m), Blencathra (273.5°, 30.1m), Skiddaw (274.5°, 34.0m), Knott (279.1°, 32.1m), Cairnsmore of Fleet (287.8°, 85.3m), Lamachan Hill (290.7°, 91.2m), Criffel (293.5°, 57.7m), Corserine (295.3°, 90.1m), Knock Fell (303.7°, 6.3m), Great Dun Fell (308.2°, 7.7m), Cross Fell (309.2°, 9.6m)
- NW-N: Meldon Hill (322.4°, 3.5m), Broad Law (326.1°, 73.9m), Cold Fell (326.9°, 23.0m), Wisp Hill (330.5°, 53.3m), Cauldcleuch Head (335.1°, 52.1m), Sighty Crag (339.8, 37.3m), Peel Fell (346.3, 48.1m), Burnhope Seat (350.3, 8.2m)

The furthest point visible is Carnedd Dafydd in Snowdonia at 123.0 miles.
