= Black Fell =

Black Fell may refer to:

- Black Fell (Lake District) (323 m), a hill near Ambleside, Cumbria
- Black Fell (Pennines) (664 m), a hill west of Alston, Cumbria
