= Burnhope Seat =

Mountain in northern England

Coordinates: 54.73202°N 2.33539°W

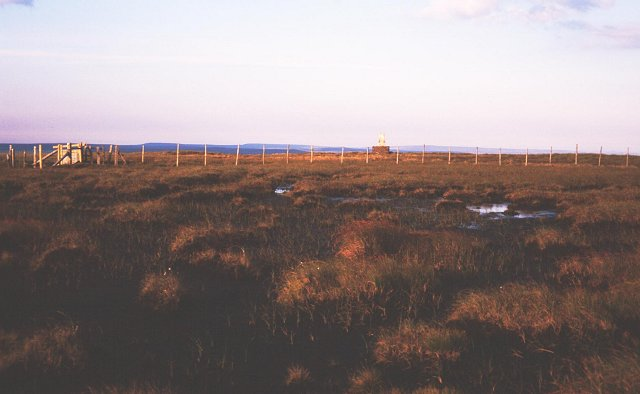
- Burnhope Seat Summit

Highest point
- Elevation: 747 m (2,451 ft)
- Prominence: 190 m (620 ft)
- Parent peak: Cross Fell
- Listing: Hewitt, Marilyn, Nuttall

Geography
- Location: Cumbria and County Durham, England
- Parent range: North Pennines
- OS grid: NY785375
- Topo map: OS Landranger 91

Burnhope Seat is a high moorland fell in the North Pennines Area of Outstanding Natural Beauty (AONB) in northern England. It lies between the heads of the Rivers Tees, South Tyne and Wear.

The summit is crossed by the boundary between County Durham and Cumbria (historically Cumberland). The trig point is the highest point in historic County Durham, although Mickle Fell is higher in the contemporary administrative County Durham. Either way, this point is not quite the summit of the mountain, which lies 400 m west and 1 m higher across the border into Cumbria.

The character of the fell is very typical of the high Pennines, with an extensive and poorly drained summit plateau of tussock grass and peat bog. The B6277 road between Alston and Middleton-in-Teesdale passes within 2 km of the summit, thus providing the easiest route of ascent. The hill may also be climbed from Weardale as part of a high-level circuit of Burnhope Reservoir. There are some ski-tows on the northwest slopes of the hill - this forms the Yad Moss ski facility, which has recently been upgraded by Sport England.

The entire area is designated "access land" under the terms of the Countryside and Rights of Way Act 2000.

The panorama is extensive. The following significant hills can be seen on the horizon (distances in miles):

- N-NE: Thirl Moor (44), Windy Gyle (49), The Cheviot (52), Hedgehope Hill (52), Tosson Hill (40), Killhope Law (5)
- NE-E: Bolt's Law (11), Pontop Pike (25), Horseshoe Hill (13), Collier Law (15)
- E-SE: Chapelfell Top (6), Black Hambleton (51)
- SE-S: Hoove (23), Rogan's Seat (23), Mickle Fell (8), Penyghent (40), High Seat (23)
- S-SW: Little Fell (10), Wild Boar Fell (24), Whernside (35), Meldon Hill (5), The Calf (26), Fell Head (26), Knock Fell (6)
- SW-W: Great Dun Fell (6), Little Dun Fell (6), Cross Fell (6), High Pike (Caldbeck) (29)
- W-NW: Melmerby Fell (8), Cairnsmore of Fleet (82), Criffel (54), Merrick (90), Corserine (86), Black Fell (10), Queensberry (63), Grey Nag (10)
- NW-N: Cold Fell (16), Hart Fell (63), White Coomb (62), Broad Law (67), Wisp Hill (46), Dun Rig (67), Cauldcleuch Head (44), Greatmoor Hill (43), Sighty Crag (29), Peel Fell (40)
