= Little Fell =

Little Fell may refer to:

- Little Fell (Mallerstang) (667m), a "Hewitt" in the Yorkshire Dales, England
- Little Fell (Mickle Fell) (748m), a "Hewitt" in the North Pennines, England
- Little Fell (Wild Boar Fell) (559m), a subsidiary summit of Wild Boar Fell, Yorkshire Dales, England
- Little Fell (Lowther Hills) (356m), a summit in the south west of the Lowther Hills, Dumfries and Galloway, Scotland
