= North Pennines =

Range of hills in northern England

Coordinates: 54°44′N 2°8′W

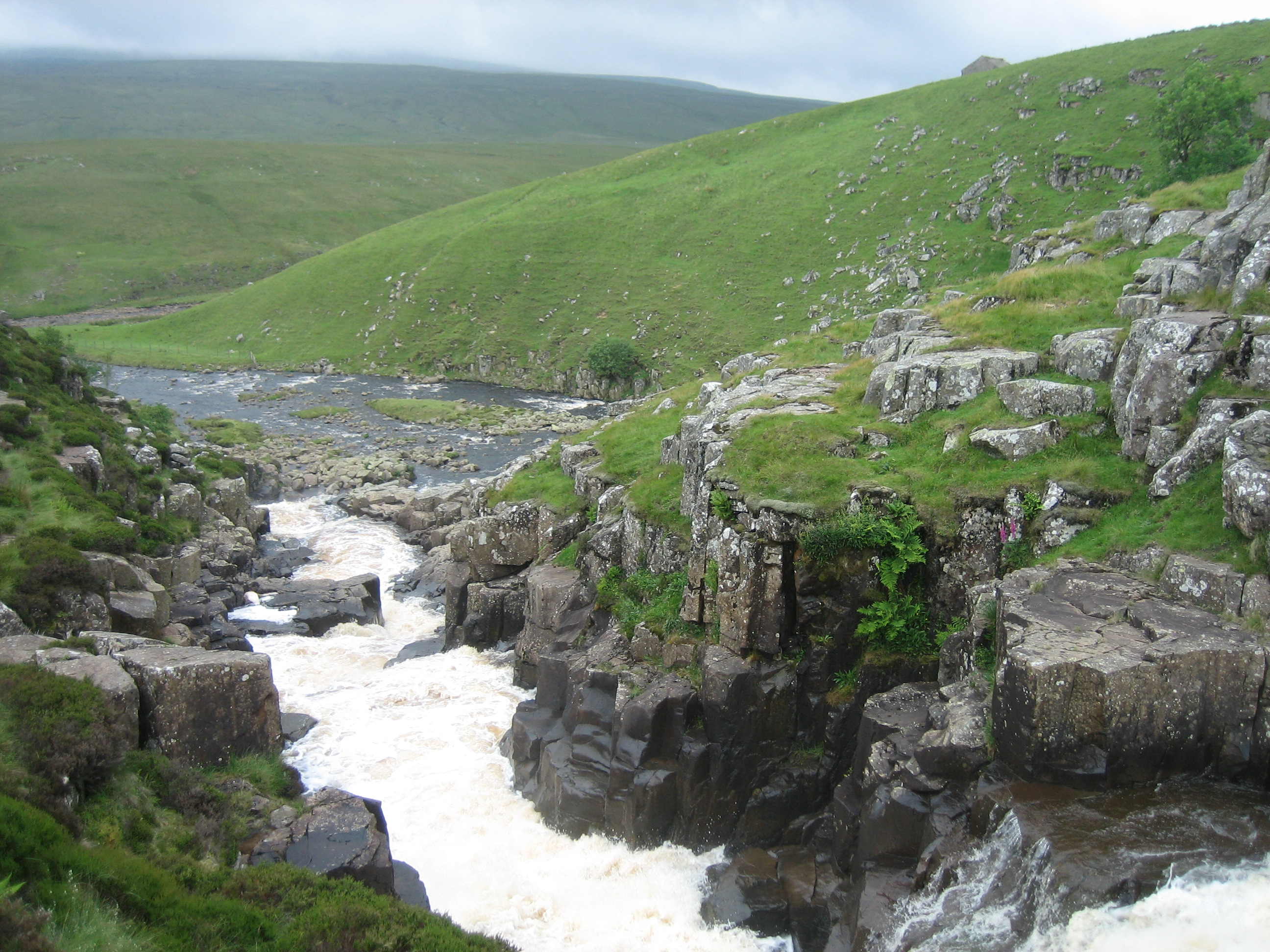
- Cauldron Snout waterfall

- Location of the North Pennines AONB in the UK
- Location: County Durham, Northumberland, North Yorkshire & Cumbria counties, England
- Max. elevation: Cross Fell; 893 m (2,930 ft)
- Designated: Area of Outstanding Natural Beauty • UNESCO Global Geopark

The North Pennines are the northernmost section of the Pennines, a range of hills which run north–south through northern England. They run along the border between County Durham and Northumberland in the east and Cumbria in the west, and are bounded to the north by the Tyne Valley and to the south by the Stainmore Gap. Much of the region is moorland, and it contains significant industrial archaeology.

The North Pennines have been designated a national landscape and a UNESCO Global Geopark.

Several major rivers rise in the North Pennines, including the Tees and Wear. The part of the area in County Durham, including Teesdale and Weardale, is known as the Durham Dales.

== Geology ==
The North Pennines are formed from a succession largely of sedimentary rocks laid down during the Palaeozoic era, later intruded by the Whin Sill and affected by glaciation during the Quaternary period.

Mud and volcanic ash deposited during the Ordovician and Silurian periods were buried and subsequently faulted and folded during the Caledonian orogeny, the mudstone becoming slaty. These rocks which are between 500 and 420 million years old are now exposed along the great scarp which defines the western edge of the area and also in an inlier in upper Teesdale. Unseen at the surface but proved in boreholes is the Weardale Granite, a batholith emplaced as molten rock into the slates and other rocks around 400 million years ago. Its presence beneath the region results in it being an upland area since granite is relatively less dense and therefore ‘buoys up’ the North Pennines. This uplifted area is known as the Alston Block and is partly defined by major faults; the Stublick and Ninety-Fathom faults to the north and the Pennine Fault to the west. To the south is the Stainmore Trough.

Overlying the early Palaeozoic rocks and granite are a succession of limestones, shales and mudstones dating from the Carboniferous period. At this time the part of the Earth’s crust which would later become England lay in the equatorial zone and was covered from time to time by shallow tropical seas. Repeated cycles of inundation led to the development of a series of cyclothems; the laying down of layers of limestone, shale and sandstone with occasional coal seams.

Shortly afterwards, (c. 295 million years ago) molten rock once again intruded the sedimentary succession, this time resulting in the emplacement of the doleritic Whin Sill within the Carboniferous sequence. Known as whinstone locally, it baked the rocks with which it came into contact, resulting in the Sugar Limestone found in upper Teesdale. Cooling of the sill itself resulted in the formation of columnar joints, characteristic of its outcrop at places like High Cup. The sill has been dated at between 301 and 294 million years old thus straddling the Carboniferous/Permian boundary.

Around the start of the Permian period, about 290 million years ago, mineral-rich waters, associated with the still warm granite, circulated within the Carboniferous succession and gave rise to mineral-rich veins which have formed the basis of a lead mining industry since at least Roman times.

During the rest of this period and into the Triassic at the start of the Mesozoic era, desert sands characterised the area; these are now seen as the New Red Sandstone of the Vale of Eden, the eastern parts of which form the lower slopes of the Pennine scarp and are within the AONB. There is no bedrock of younger age to be found within the North Pennines; for much of the time since the deposition of the Triassic sandstones, it is likely the area was above sea level and subject to erosion.

A series of major global climate cycles during the current Quaternary period resulted in a series of ice ages, evidence for the last ice age is found within the North Pennines both in term of erosional and depositional features. Glacial till is widespread and drumlin are encountered, both indicative of the presence of moving ice within the landscape. It may be that some higher ground was not over-ridden by ice but remained exposed through subject to harsh climatic conditions. Glacial meltwater carved channels and rivers have continued to shape the landscape in the post-glacial era.

== Economy ==
Besides farming, mining and quarrying have been a mainstay of the local economy over centuries. The area has in the past been mined and quarried for minerals such as barytes, coal fluorspar, iron, lead, witherite and zinc.

In 2013, a Canadian mining company were allowed to test drill for zinc around Allenheads and Nenthead. They said the region was sitting on a "world-class" deposit of zinc and predicted that a new mine in the area could produce 1,000,000 tonnes (980,000 long tons; 1,100,000 short tons) of zinc ore per year.

== Natural history ==
In the North Pennines National Landscape area are: 40% of the UK's upland hay meadows; 30% of England's upland heathland and 27% of its blanket bog; 80% of England's black grouse (and also breeding short-eared owl, ring ouzel, common snipe and common redshank); 36% of the National Landscape area is designated as Sites of Special Scientific Interest; red squirrels, otters and rare arctic alpine plants; 22,000 pairs of breeding waders and one of England's biggest waterfalls – High Force. The area shares a boundary with the Yorkshire Dales National Park in the south and extends as far as the Tyne Valley, just south of Hadrian's Wall in the north.

The North Pennines are notable for rare flora and fauna, including wild alpine plants not found elsewhere in Britain. It is also home to red squirrels and diverse birds of prey. The impressive landscape of the North Pennines – from High Force on the River Tees to the sweeping valley of High Cup Gill above Dufton – are the product of millions of years of geological processes. The worldwide significance of the geology found in the area was recognised in 2003 when the National Landscape became Britain's first European Geopark. A year later the area become one of the founding members of the UNESCO-assisted Global Geopark family and in 2015 it was accorded official status as a UNESCO Global Geopark. Geoparks are areas with outstanding geological heritage where this is being used to support sustainable development.

Another of the North Pennines' oddities is that it is home to England's only named wind, the Helm Wind. It has caught out many walkers traversing the plateaux around Cross Fell, the Eden Valley fellside, and the valleys between Alston and Dufton.

== Recreation ==
One of the many walking routes in the North Pennines is Isaac's Tea Trail, a circular route of 37 miles (60 km) around the area, running from Ninebanks via Allendale, Nenthead and Alston. The Pennine Way also crosses the area, including a stretch through Teesdale, a lush valley with dramatic river scenery including the twin attractions of High Force and Cauldron Snout.

== Culture ==
The great English poet W. H. Auden spent much time in this area and some forty poems and two plays are set here. Auden visited the area in 1919 and "five years later was writing poems about Alston Moor and Allendale." He referred to the region as his "Mutterland", his "great good place", and equated it with his idea of Eden. Scores of Pennine place-names are found in his work, including Cauldron Snout and Rookhope.

== National landscape ==
An area of 770 square miles (2,000 km^{2}) in the North Pennines was designated as an area of outstanding natural beauty (AONB) in 1988; in 2023 AONBs were rebranded as national landscapes, however their legal designation remains unchanged.

The area was designated for its moorland scenery, the product of centuries of farming and lead-mining. It is the second largest of the 49 national landscapes in the United Kingdom after the Cotswolds. In addition to the areas named above, the designated area includes 2.6 square kilometres (1.0 sq mi) of North Yorkshire around Tan Hill. There is a small national landscape visitor centre at Bowlees which aims to provide a gateway to upper Teesdale and the wider North Pennines.

== Principal summits ==
The following hills within the National Landscape have more than 30 metres of prominence. Hills marked with a * are more closely topographically connected to the Yorkshire Dales, being south of Stainmore Gap.

1. Cross Fell (893.1m)
2. Great Dun Fell (847.5m)
3. Little Dun Fell (842m)
4. Knock Fell (794m)
5. Mickle Fell (790.2m)
6. Meldon Hill (767m)
7. Little Fell (748m)
8. Burnhope Seat (747.8m)
9. Dead Stones (710m)
10. Melmerby Fell (709m)
11. Great Stony Hill (708m)
12. Chapelfell Top (700.3m)
13. Round Hill (686m)
14. Westernhope Moor (675m)
15. Murton Fell (673.6m)
16. Killhope Law (673m)
17. Black Fell (664m)
18. Nine Standards Rigg (661.9m)*
19. Grey Nag (656m)
20. Three Pikes (650.4m)
21. Viewing Hill (649m)
22. Cold Fell (621m)
23. Bink Moss (619m)
24. Flinty Fell (614.6m)
25. The Dodd (614m)
26. Middlehope Moor (611.9m)
27. Thack Moor (609.7m)
28. Murton Pike (594m)
29. Roman Fell (594m)
30. Croglin Fell (592m)
31. Alston Moor (580m)
32. Dry Rigg (564.6m)
33. Iron Band (563m)
34. Nateby Common (547m)*
35. Hard Rigg (546m)
36. Bolt's Law (541m)
37. Cuns Fell (539m)
38. Brownley Hill (533.6m)
39. Pike Rigg (526m)
40. Ayle Common (524.1m)
41. High Greygrits (522m)*
42. Horseshoe Hill (519.8m)
43. Moudy Mea (519.8m)*
44. Brownber Hill (519m)
45. Collier Law (516m)
46. Great Knipe (514.9m)
47. Park Fell (511m)
48. Islington Hill (492m)
49. Cumrew Fell (483m)
50. Dufton Pike (481.2m)
51. Grey Carrs (461m)
52. Mount Ida (449m)
53. Lilswood Moor (447.4m)
54. Little Heaplaw (438.5m)
55. Hope Fell (427m)
56. Burney Hill (426m)
57. Green Hill (419.6m)
58. Dine Holm Scar (414m)
59. Flagdaw (413.7m)
60. Long Rigg (413m)*
61. Millstone Grits (411m)
62. Birkett Hill (north-east) (405m)*
63. Simmerson Hill (400m)
64. Knock Pike (398m)
65. Birkett Hill (south-west) (383m)*
66. Catterpallot Hill (383m)
67. Talkin Fell (381.5m)
68. Barnarm Scar (371m)
69. Sand Edge Common (354.2m)
70. Keisley Bank (354m)
71. High Out Wood (352m)*
72. Catton Beacon (337m)
73. Whinny Fell (336m)
74. Tortie Hill (296m)
75. Harsondale Law (268m)
76. Brough Hill (193.6m)

The following summit lies outside the National Landscape but within the National Character Area:

1. Blenkinsopp Common (289.6m)

The following summits are over 300 metres high but outside the National Landscape:

1. Cragg Top (312m)
2. Pontop Pike (312m)
3. Kilmond Scars (310m)
4. Billy Hill (306m)
