= The Calf =

Mountain in Cumbria, England

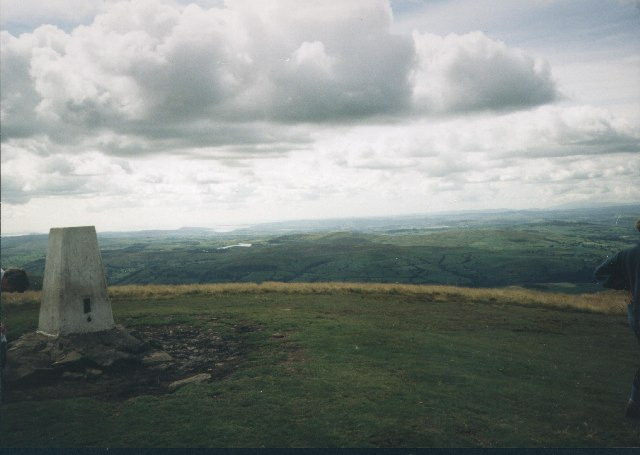
- The trig point at the summit, looking towards the distant Pennines

Highest point
- Elevation: 676 m (2,218 ft)
- Prominence: 383 m (1,257 ft)
- Parent peak: Cross Fell
- Listing: Marilyn, Hewitt, Nuttall
- Coordinates: 54°22′03″N 2°30′51″W

Geography
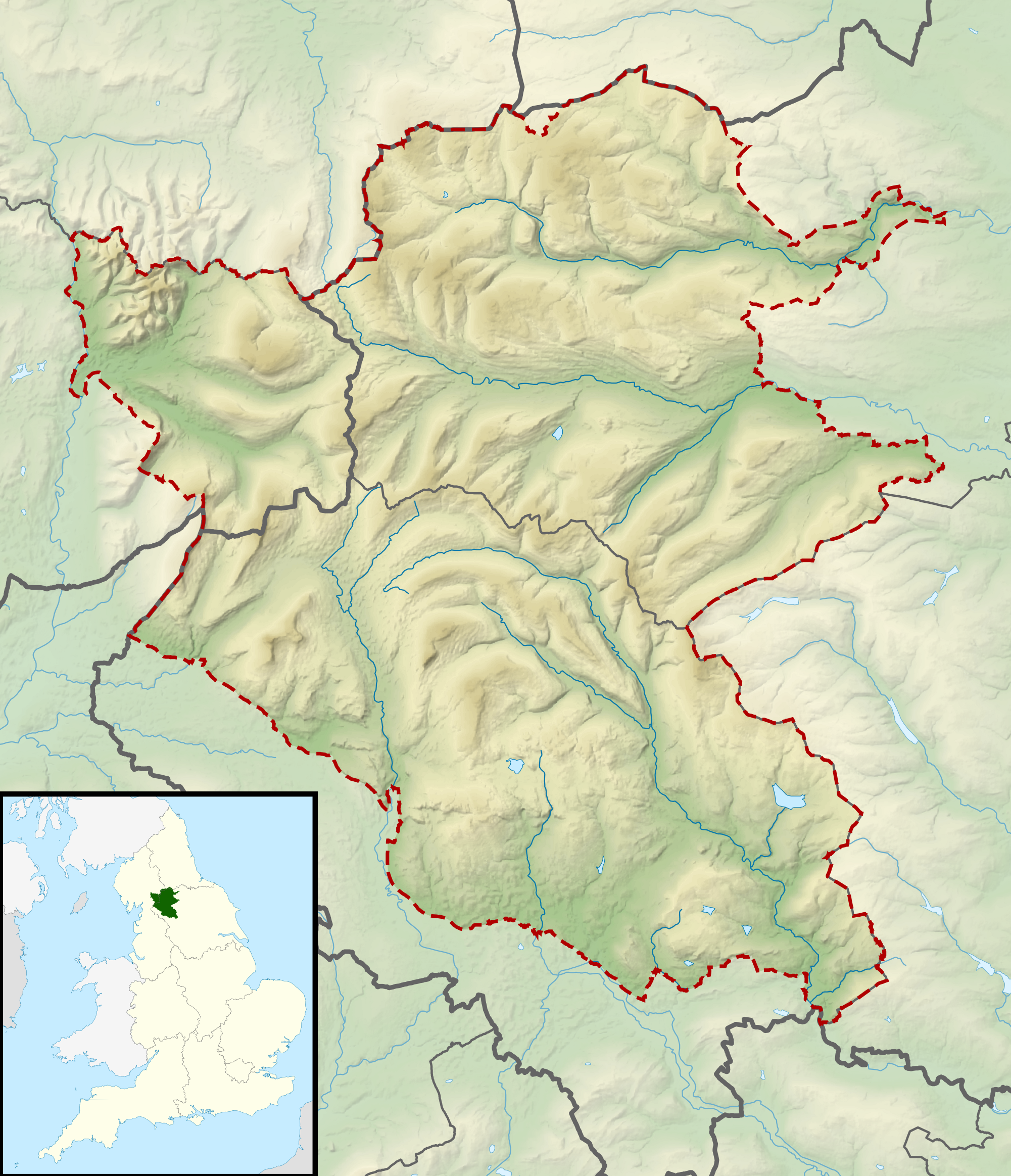
- Location within Yorkshire Dales
- Location: Yorkshire Dales, Westmorland and Furness, Cumbria, England
- OS grid: SD667970
- Topo map: OS Landranger 98

The Calf, at an elevation of 676 metres (2,218 ft), is the highest point in the Howgill Fells, an area of high ground in north-west England. It is in the north-west of the Yorkshire Dales in Westmorland and Furness in the county of Cumbria (historically it was on the West Riding of Yorkshire/Westmorland boundary). It can be ascended from the town of Sedbergh to the south, by way of Cautley Spout from the east, or up the long valley of Langdale from the north. The Sedbergh ascent is the most popular, and has the distinction of being on good paths all the way.

The summit commands an extensive panorama, although foreground detail is obscured by the extreme flatness of the plateau. A twenty-mile skyline of the Lakeland peaks can be seen, as well as the Yorkshire Three Peaks and many of the nearer Howgill Fells.

Alfred Wainwright, in his Walks on the Howgill Fells, describes a route from Sedbergh to Calders and The Calf as "the classic high-level walk on the Howgill Fells". He includes a drawing of the trig point on the summit of The Calf, discusses a "reclining" standing stone 400 yards to the north-east which appears on large-scale Ordnance Survey maps, and spends a column of text discussing "the altitude of Calders", which he estimates as 2215 ft. He gives diagrams of the views covering the full 360 degrees, and sketches of the Lakeland skyline and the view of the Yorkshire Three Peaks to the south-east. He also describes ascents of the Calf from Castley ("this impressive expedition", "a beautiful walk"), Beck Houses farm on the west of the Howgills (" this high-level traverse of the plateau splendidly reveals the topographical details of the Howgills") and Bowderdale ("the longest direct ascent of The Calf").

Calders, at 674 metres (2,211 ft), is about 1 km SSE of the summit of The Calf. It is classified as a Hewitt.
