= Dufton Pike =

Hill in Cumbria, England

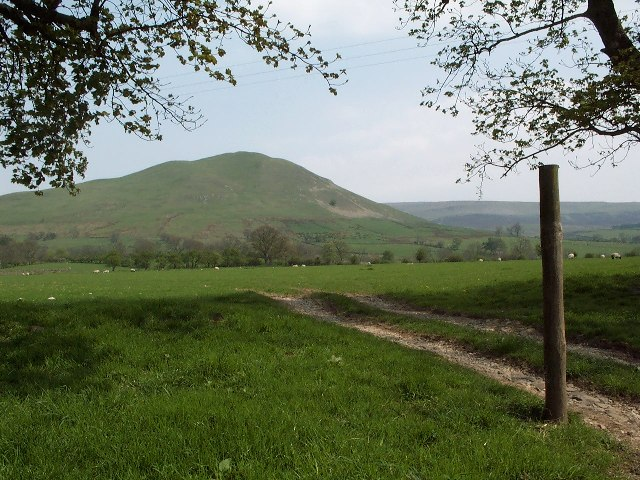
- Dufton Pike from the West

Highest point
- Elevation: 481 m (1,578 ft)
- Prominence: 163 m (535 ft)
- Parent peak: Cross Fell
- Listing: Marilyn
- Coordinates: 54.6339°N 2.4663°W

Geography
- Location: Pennines, England
- OS grid: NY699266

Dufton Pike is a hill in the northern Pennines, in Cumbria, England. It is 481 metres (1,578 ft) above sea level and is classed as a Marilyn (a hill with topographic prominence of at least 150m). It rises above the village of Dufton. Dufton Fell lies between the pike and Cow Green Reservoir.
