= List of Nuttall mountains =

Peaks above 2,000 feet

Nuttall
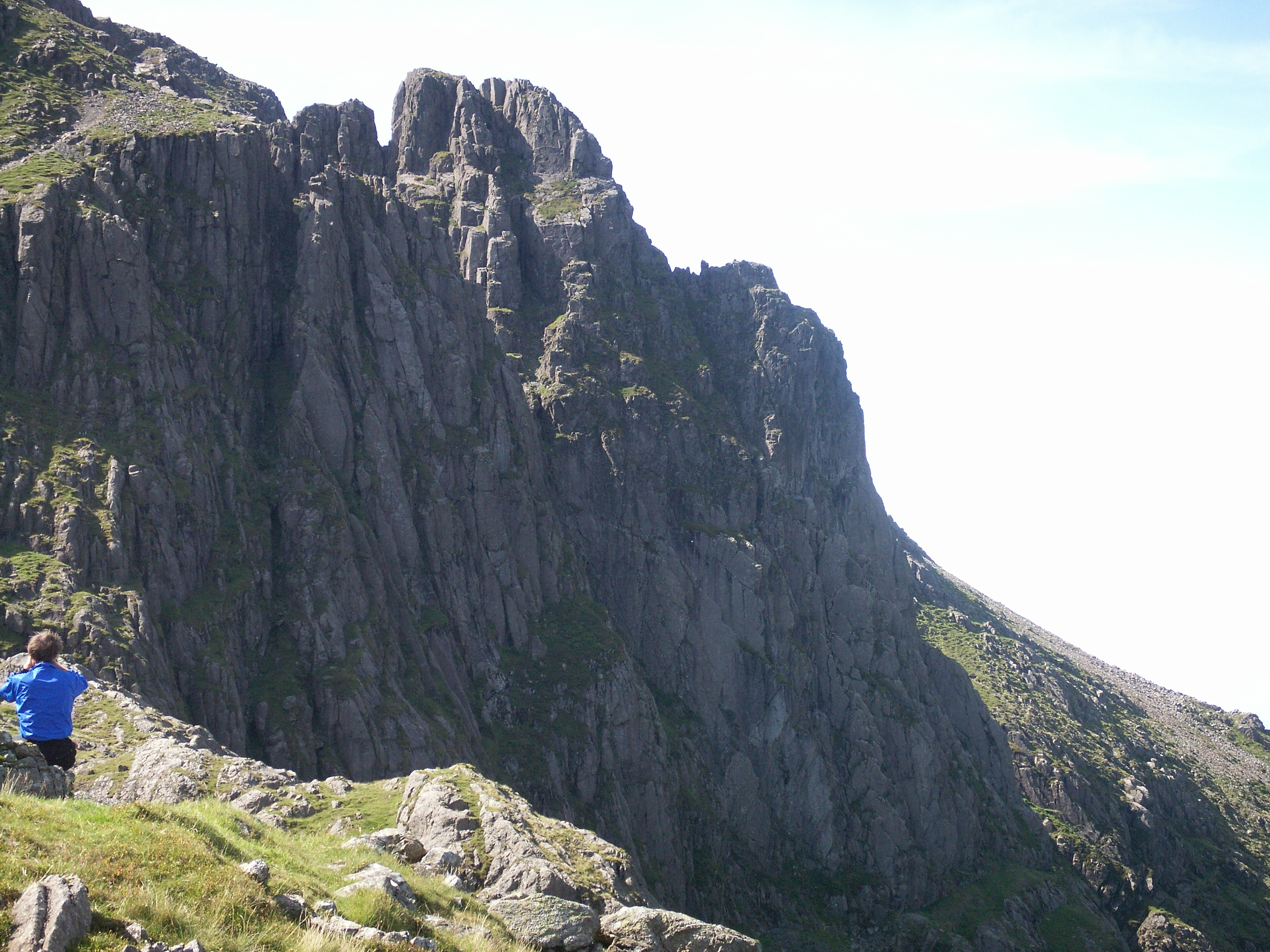
- Pillar Rock in the Lake District National Park is the only Nuttall that requires ropes to climb.

Highest point
- Elevation: over 2,000 ft (609.6 m)
- Prominence: over 15 m (49 ft 3 in)

Geography
- Location: 446 England & Wales: 257 England; 189 Wales

This is a list of Nuttall mountains by height. Nuttalls are defined as peaks in England and Wales above 2,000 feet (609.6 m) in height, the general requirement to be called a "mountain" in the British Isles, and with a prominence above 15 metres (49 ft 3 in); a mix of imperial and metric thresholds.

The Nuttall classification was suggested by Anne and John Nuttall in their 1990 two–volume book, "The Mountains of England and Wales". The list was updated with subsequent revised editions by the Nuttalls. Because of the prominence threshold of only 15 metres (49.2 ft), the list is subject to ongoing revisions. In response, Alan Dawson introduced the Hewitts, with a higher prominence threshold of 30 metres (98 ft 5 in). This was the prominence threshold that the UIAA set down in 1994 for an "independent" peak. In 2010, Dawson replaced his Hewitts with the fully "metric" Simms, consisting of a height threshold of 600 metres (1,968 ft 6 in), and a prominence threshold of 30 metres (98 ft 5 in). However, both the Nuttall and Hewitt classifications have become popular with peak baggers, and both remain in use, and their respective authors maintain up to date lists, as does the Database of British and Irish Hills.

As of October 2018 446 Nuttalls, with 257 in England and 189 in Wales. (Note: Windy Gyle is classed by the DoBIH as being "ES", which means on the border of England and Scotland, however their website, Hill Bagging, counts Windy Gale as an English Nuttall) The first people registered as climbing all of the Nuttalls were Anne and John Nuttall themselves, in March 1990. A register of people who declare they have climbed all of the Nuttalls is kept by the Long Distance Walkers Association ("LDWA"); As of October 2018, it totalled 302 names. (Note: A separate mark of NRP (Not Pillar Rock) is noted for climbers who decide not to undertake the rock-climbing needed to summit Pillar Rock) On 29 June 2025, Alex Staniforth successfully completed a human-powered round of all 446 Nuttalls in a new record of 45 days.

== Coverage of Nuttalls ==
The table below of 257 English Nuttalls at October 2018, include:

1. All 180 of the Hewitts in England (by definition, a Hewitt is a Nuttall);
2. 51 of the 175 Marilyn mountains and hills in England;
3. All 4 of the 120 P600 mountains in the British Isles that are English (by definition, a P600 is a Nuttall).

The table below of 189 Welsh Nuttalls at October 2018, include:

1. All 135 of the Hewitts in Wales (by definition, a Hewitt is a Nuttall);
2. 53 of the 158 Marilyn mountains and hills in Wales;
3. All 8 of the 120 P600 mountains in the British Isles that are Welsh (by definition, a P600 is a Nuttall).

== Nuttall mountains in England by height ==
Data is from the Database of British and Irish Hills ("DoBIH") in October 2018, and are peaks DoBIH marks as English ("E" and "ES"), and Nuttalls ("N"). (Note: The Database of British and Irish Hills ("DoBIH") is the most referenced database for the classification of peaks in the British Isles, and the DoBIH is licensed under a "Creative Commons Attribution 3.0 Unported License".) John and Anne Nuttall update the list of Nuttalls from time to time, and the DoBIH also updates their measurements as more surveys are recorded, so these tables should not be amended or updated unless the entire DoBIH data is re-downloaded again.

Nuttalls in England, ranked by height (DoBIH, October 2018)
Height Rank	Prom. Rank	Name	Parent Name (Note: In the DoBIH, this is the "Parent (Ma)" code, which the DoBIH define as follows: "The hill number and name of the parent Marilyn of lower prominence hills. In the Excel and csv versions the hill's own number is given for hills that are parents (there are no parents of parents) and '0' indicates a non-Marilyn with no parent. Thus a filter or sort on this column will return a parent (usually first) and all its children.")	Map Sec.	Area (Nuttalls) (Note: In the DoBIH, this is a special DoBIH column that is used to match, as best as possible, the terms given in specific books on mountains, namely the Munros, the Wainwrights and the Nuttalls.)	County	Height (m)	Prom. (m)	Height (ft)	Prom. (ft)	Topo Map	OS Grid Reference	Classification (§ DoBIH codes)
1	1	Scafell Pike		34B	Lake District - Southern Fells	Cumbria	978	912	3,209	2,992	89 90	NY215072	Ma,F,Sim,Hew,N,W,B, Sy,Fel,CoH,CoU,CoA
2	64	Scafell	Scafell Pike	34B	Lake District - Southern Fells	Cumbria	964	132	3,162	434	89 90	NY206064	Hu,F,Sim,Hew,N,W,B,Sy,Fel
3	211	Symonds Knott	Scafell Pike	34B	Lake District - Southern Fells	Cumbria	959	21	3,147	69	89 90	NY207067	N,sSim,Sy
4	2	Helvellyn		34C	Lake District - Eastern Fells	Cumbria	950	712	3,117	2,336	90	NY342151	Ma,F,Sim,Hew,N,W,B,Sy,Fel,CoH
5	118	Broad Crag	Scafell Pike	34B	Lake District - Southern Fells	Cumbria	935	58	3,069	189	89 90	NY218075	F,Sim,Hew,N,B,Sy
6	3	Skiddaw		34A	Lake District - Northern Fells	Cumbria	931	709	3,054	2,326	89 90	NY260290	Ma,F,Sim,Hew,N,W,B,Sy,Fel
7	131	Ill Crag	Scafell Pike	34B	Lake District - Southern Fells	Cumbria	931	49	3,054	159	89 90	NY223073	F,Sim,Hew,N,B,Sy
8	221	Helvellyn Lower Man	Helvellyn	34C	Lake District - Eastern Fells	Cumbria	925	18	3,035	59	90	NY337155	N,B,Sy
9	119	Great End	Scafell Pike	34B	Lake District - Southern Fells	Cumbria	910	56	2,984	184	89 90	NY226083	Sim,Hew,N,W,B,Sy,Fel
10	54	Bowfell	Scafell Pike	34B	Lake District - Southern Fells	Cumbria	903	148	2,962	486	89 90	NY244064	Hu,Sim,Hew,N,sMa,W,B,Sy,Fel
11	11	Great Gable		34B	Lake District - Western Fells	Cumbria	899	425	2,949	1,394	89 90	NY211103	Ma,Sim,Hew,N,W,B,Sy,Fel
12	4	Cross Fell		35A	North Pennines - Western Fells	Cumbria	893	651	2,930	2,136	91	NY687343	Ma,Sim,Hew,N
13	18	Pillar		34B	Lake District - Western Fells	Cumbria	892	348	2,926	1,142	89 90	NY171121	Ma,Sim,Hew,N,W,B,Sy,Fel
14	181	Nethermost Pike	Helvellyn	34C	Lake District - Eastern Fells	Cumbria	891	29	2,923	95	90	NY343142	N,sSim,W,B,Sy,Fel
15	110	Catstycam	Helvellyn	34C	Lake District - Eastern Fells	Cumbria	890	63	2,920	207	90	NY348158	Sim,Hew,N,W,B,Sy,Fel
16	77	Esk Pike	Scafell Pike	34B	Lake District - Southern Fells	Cumbria	885	112	2,904	367	89 90	NY236075	Hu,Sim,Hew,N,W,B,Sy,Fel
17	84	Raise	Helvellyn	34C	Lake District - Eastern Fells	Cumbria	883	91	2,897	299	90	NY342174	Sim,Hew,N,sHu,W,B,Sy,Fel
18	22	Fairfield		34C	Lake District - Eastern Fells	Cumbria	873	299	2,864	981	90	NY358117	Ma,Sim,Hew,N,W,B,Sy,Fel
19	9	Blencathra		34A	Lake District - Northern Fells	Cumbria	868	461	2,848	1,512	90	NY323277	Ma,Sim,Hew,N,W,B,Sy,Fel
20	245	Bowfell North Top	Scafell Pike	34B	Lake District - Southern Fells	Cumbria	866	15	2,841	49	89 90	NY244070	N,Sy
21	112	Skiddaw Little Man	Skiddaw	34A	Lake District - Northern Fells	Cumbria	865	61	2,838	200	89 90	NY266277	Sim,Hew,N,W,B,Sy,Fel
22	139	White Side	Helvellyn	34C	Lake District - Eastern Fells	Cumbria	863	42	2,831	138	90	NY337166	Sim,Hew,N,W,B,Sy,Fel
23	183	Striding Edge	Helvellyn	34C	Lake District - Eastern Fells	Cumbria	863	28	2,831	92	90	NY350149	N,sSim,Sy
24	62	Crinkle Crags - Long Top	Scafell Pike	34B	Lake District - Southern Fells	Cumbria	859	139	2,818	456	89 90	NY248048	Hu,Sim,Hew,N,W,B,Sy,Fel
25	125	Dollywaggon Pike	Helvellyn	34C	Lake District - Eastern Fells	Cumbria	858	50	2,815	164	90	NY346130	Sim,Hew,N,W,B,Sy,Fel
26	80	Great Dodd	Helvellyn	34C	Lake District - Eastern Fells	Cumbria	857	109	2,812	358	90	NY342205	Hu,Sim,Hew,N,W,B,Sy,Fel
27	7	Grasmoor		34B	Lake District - North Western Fells	Cumbria	852	519	2,795	1,703	89 90	NY174203	Ma,Sim,Hew,N,W,B,Sy,Fel
28	222	Gategill Fell Top	Blencathra	34A	Lake District - Northern Fells	Cumbria	851	18	2,792	59	90	NY317273	N,B,Sy
29	94	Great Dun Fell	Cross Fell	35A	North Pennines - Western Fells	Cumbria	848	76	2,782	249	91	NY710321	Sim,Hew,N
30	234	Atkinson Pike	Blencathra	34A	Lake District - Northern Fells	Cumbria	845	16	2,772	52	90	NY324283	N,B,Sy
31	105	Stybarrow Dodd	Helvellyn	34C	Lake District - Eastern Fells	Cumbria	843	68	2,766	223	90	NY343189	Sim,Hew,N,W,B,Sy,Fel
32	113	Little Dun Fell	Cross Fell	35A	North Pennines - Western Fells	Cumbria	842	61	2,762	200	91	NY704330	Sim,Hew,N
33	48	St Sunday Crag		34C	Lake District - Eastern Fells	Cumbria	841	159	2,759	522	90	NY369133	Ma,Sim,Hew,N,W,B,Sy,Fel
34	91	Scoat Fell	Pillar	34B	Lake District - Western Fells	Cumbria	841	86	2,759	282	89	NY159113	Sim,Hew,N,W,B,Sy,Fel
35	73	Crag Hill	Grasmoor	34B	Lake District - North Western Fells	Cumbria	839	117	2,753	384	89 90	NY192203	Hu,Sim,Hew,N,W,B,Sy,Fel
36	170	Crinkle Crags South Top	Scafell Pike	34B	Lake District - Southern Fells	Cumbria	834	32	2,736	105	89 90	NY250045	Sim,Hew,N,B,Sy
37	16	High Street		34C	Lake District - Far Eastern Fells	Cumbria	828	373	2,717	1,224	90	NY440110	Ma,Sim,Hew,N,W,B,Sy,Fel
38	164	Black Crag	Pillar	34B	Lake District - Western Fells	Cumbria	828	34	2,717	112	89	NY166116	Sim,Hew,N,B,Sy
39	111	Red Pike (Wasdale)	Pillar	34B	Lake District - Western Fells	Cumbria	826	62	2,710	203	89	NY165106	Sim,Hew,N,W,B,Sy,Fel
40	132	Hart Crag	Fairfield	34C	Lake District - Eastern Fells	Cumbria	822	48	2,697	157	90	NY369112	Sim,Hew,N,W,B,Sy,Fel
41	192	Steeple	Pillar	34B	Lake District - Western Fells	Cumbria	819	24	2,687	79	89	NY157116	N,sSim,W,B,Sy,Fel
42	5	The Cheviot		33	The Cheviots	Northumberland	815	556	2,674	1,824	74 75	NT909205	Ma,Sim,Hew,N,CoH,CoU,CoA
43	172	Shelter Crags	Scafell Pike	34B	Lake District - Southern Fells	Cumbria	815	31	2,674	102	89 90	NY249053	Sim,Hew,N,B,Sy
44	17	High Stile		34B	Lake District - Western Fells	Cumbria	807	362	2,648	1,188	89 90	NY170148	Ma,Sim,Hew,N,B,Sy,Fel
45	100	Lingmell	Scafell Pike	34B	Lake District - Southern Fells	Cumbria	807	72	2,648	236	89 90	NY209081	Sim,Hew,N,W,B,Sy,Fel
46	12	The Old Man of Coniston		34D	Lake District - Southern Fells	Cumbria	802	415	2,633	1,362	96 97	SD272978	Ma,Sim,Hew,N,W,B,Sy,Fel,CoH
47	70	Swirl How	The Old Man of Coniston	34D	Lake District - Southern Fells	Cumbria	802	120	2,633	394	89 90	NY272005	Hu,Sim,Hew,N,W,B,Sy,Fel
48	42	Kirk Fell		34B	Lake District - Western Fells	Cumbria	802	181	2,631	594	89 90	NY194104	Ma,Sim,Hew,N,W,B,Sy,Fel
49	88	High Raise (High Street)	High Street	34C	Lake District - Far Eastern Fells	Cumbria	802	88	2,631	289	90	NY448134	Sim,Hew,N,W,B,Sy,Fel
50	126	Green Gable	Great Gable	34B	Lake District - Western Fells	Cumbria	801	50	2,628	164	89 90	NY214107	Sim,Hew,N,W,B,Sy,Fel
51	83	Haycock	Pillar	34B	Lake District - Western Fells	Cumbria	797	94	2,615	308	89	NY144107	Sim,Hew,N,sHu,W,B,Sy,Fel
52	206	Brim Fell	The Old Man of Coniston	34D	Lake District - Southern Fells	Cumbria	796	21	2,612	69	96 97	SD270985	N,sSim,W,B,Sy,Fel
53	177	Green Side	Helvellyn	34C	Lake District - Eastern Fells	Cumbria	795	30	2,608	98	90	NY352187	Sim,Hew,N,B,Sy
54	133	Knock Fell	Cross Fell	35A	North Pennines - Western Fells	Cumbria	794	48	2,605	157	91	NY721302	Sim,Hew,N
55	127	Dove Crag	Fairfield	34C	Lake District - Eastern Fells	Cumbria	792	50	2,598	164	90	NY374104	Sim,Hew,N,W,B,Sy,Fel
56	140	Rampsgill Head	High Street	34C	Lake District - Far Eastern Fells	Cumbria	792	41	2,598	135	90	NY443128	Sim,Hew,N,W,B,Sy,Fel
57	41	Grisedale Pike		34B	Lake District - North Western Fells	Cumbria	791	189	2,595	620	89 90	NY198225	Ma,Sim,Hew,N,W,B,Sy,Fel
58	35	Mickle Fell		35A	North Pennines - Western Fells	Durham	790	212	2,592	696	91 92	NY806245	Ma,Sim,Hew,N,CoH,CoU,CoA
59	158	Kirk Fell East Top	Kirk Fell	34B	Lake District - Western Fells	Cumbria	787	36	2,582	118	89 90	NY199107	Sim,Hew,N,B,Sy
60	115	Allen Crags	Scafell Pike	34B	Lake District - Southern Fells	Cumbria	785	60	2,575	197	89 90	NY236085	Sim,Hew,N,W,B,Sy,Fel
61	212	Great Carrs	The Old Man of Coniston	34D	Lake District - Southern Fells	Cumbria	785	20	2,575	66	89 90	NY270009	N,sSim,W,B,Sy,Fel
62	173	Thornthwaite Crag	High Street	34C	Lake District - Far Eastern Fells	Cumbria	784	31	2,572	102	90	NY431100	Sim,Hew,N,W,B,Sy,Fel
63	69	Glaramara	Scafell Pike	34B	Lake District - Southern Fells	Cumbria	783	121	2,569	397	89 90	NY245104	Hu,Sim,Hew,N,W,B,Sy,Fel
64	246	Pillar Rock	Pillar	34B	Lake District - Western Fells	Cumbria	780	15	2,559	49	89 90	NY171123	N,B,Sy
65	247	Kidsty Pike	High Street	34C	Lake District - Far Eastern Fells	Cumbria	780	15	2,559	49	90	NY447125	N,W,B,Sy,Fel
66	52	Harter Fell (Mardale)	High Street	34C	Lake District - Far Eastern Fells	Cumbria	779	149	2,556	489	90	NY459093	Hu,Sim,Hew,N,sMa,W,B,Sy,Fel
67	66	Dow Crag	The Old Man of Coniston	34D	Lake District - Southern Fells	Cumbria	778	129	2,552	423	96 97	SD262977	Hu,Sim,Hew,N,W,B,Sy,Fel
68	29	Red Screes		34C	Lake District - Eastern Fells	Cumbria	776	260	2,546	853	90	NY396087	Ma,Sim,Hew,N,W,B,Sy,Fel
69	203	Looking Steads (Glaramara)	Scafell Pike	34B	Lake District - Southern Fells	Cumbria	775	22	2,543	72	89 90	NY245101	N,sSim,B,Sy
70	235	Shelter Crags North Top	Scafell Pike	34B	Lake District - Southern Fells	Cumbria	775	16	2,543	52	89 90	NY249057	N,Sy
71	93	Grey Friar	The Old Man of Coniston	34D	Lake District - Southern Fells	Cumbria	773	78	2,536	256	89 90	NY260003	Sim,Hew,N,W,B,Sy,Fel
72	171	Sail	Grasmoor	34B	Lake District - North Western Fells	Cumbria	773	32	2,536	105	89 90	NY198202	Sim,Hew,N,W,B,Sy,Fel
73	178	Wandope	Grasmoor	34B	Lake District - North Western Fells	Cumbria	772	30	2,533	98	89 90	NY188197	Sim,Hew,N,W,B,Sy,Fel
74	82	Hopegill Head	Grisedale Pike	34B	Lake District - North Western Fells	Cumbria	770	97	2,526	318	89 90	NY185221	Sim,Hew,N,sHu,W,B,Sy,Fel
75	109	Meldon Hill	Cross Fell	35A	North Pennines - Western Fells	Cumbria	767	65	2,516	213	91	NY771290	Sim,Hew,N
76	174	Great Rigg	Fairfield	34C	Lake District - Eastern Fells	Cumbria	766	31	2,513	102	90	NY355104	Sim,Hew,N,W,B,Sy,Fel
77	44	Stony Cove Pike		34C	Lake District - Far Eastern Fells	Cumbria	763	171	2,503	561	90	NY417100	Ma,Sim,Hew,N,W,B,Sy,Fel
78	58	Wetherlam	The Old Man of Coniston	34D	Lake District - Southern Fells	Cumbria	763	145	2,503	476	89 90	NY288011	Hu,Sim,Hew,N,sMa,W,B,Sy,Fel
79	25	High Raise		34B	Lake District - Central Fells	Cumbria	762	283	2,500	928	89 90	NY280095	Ma,Sim,Hew,N,W,B,Sy,Fel
80	68	Ill Bell	High Street	34C	Lake District - Far Eastern Fells	Cumbria	757	124	2,484	407	90	NY436077	Hu,Sim,Hew,N,W,B,Sy,Fel
81	199	Hart Side	Helvellyn	34C	Lake District - Eastern Fells	Cumbria	756	23	2,480	75	90	NY359197	N,sSim,W,B,Sy,Fel
82	229	Sand Hill	Grisedale Pike	34B	Lake District - North Western Fells	Cumbria	756	17	2,480	56	89 90	NY187218	N,B,Sy
83	142	Red Pike (Buttermere)	High Stile	34B	Lake District - Western Fells	Cumbria	755	40	2,477	131	89	NY160154	Sim,Hew,N,W,B,Sy,Fel
84	14	Dale Head		34B	Lake District - North Western Fells	Cumbria	753	397	2,470	1,302	89 90	NY222153	Ma,Sim,Hew,N,W,B,Sy,Fel
85	98	Little Fell	Mickle Fell	35A	North Pennines - Western Fells	Cumbria	748	73	2,454	239	91	NY780222	Sim,Hew,N
86	40	Burnhope Seat		35A	North Pennines - Eastern Fells	Cumbria	747	190	2,451	623	91	NY784375	Ma,Sim,Hew,N
87	179	Carl Side	Skiddaw	34A	Lake District - Northern Fells	Cumbria	746	30	2,447	98	89 90	NY254280	Sim,Hew,N,W,B,Sy,Fel
88	154	Black Sails	The Old Man of Coniston	34D	Lake District - Southern Fells	Cumbria	745	37	2,444	121	89 90	NY282007	Sim,Hew,N,B,Sy
89	161	High Crag (Buttermere)	High Stile	34B	Lake District - Western Fells	Cumbria	744	35	2,441	115	89 90	NY180139	Sim,Hew,N,W,B,Sy,Fel
90	200	Round How	Scafell Pike	34B	Lake District - Southern Fells	Cumbria	741	23	2,431	75	89 90	NY218081	N,sSim,Sy
91	190	Little Stand	Scafell Pike	34B	Lake District - Southern Fells	Cumbria	740	25	2,428	82	89 90	NY250033	N,sSim,B,Sy,Fel
92	155	Hobcarton Crag	Grisedale Pike	34B	Lake District - North Western Fells	Cumbria	739	37	2,425	121	89 90	NY193220	Sim,Hew,N,B,Sy
93	46	Robinson		34B	Lake District - North Western Fells	Cumbria	737	161	2,418	528	89 90	NY201168	Ma,Sim,Hew,N,W,B,Sy,Fel
94	51	Seat Sandal		34C	Lake District - Eastern Fells	Cumbria	737	152	2,417	498	90	NY344115	Ma,Sim,Hew,N,W,B,Sy,Fel
95	13	Whernside		35B	Yorkshire Dales - Southern Fells	Cumbria/ North Yorkshire	736	408	2,415	1,339	98	SD738814	Ma,Sim,Hew,N,CoH,CoU,CoA
96	124	Harrison Stickle	High Raise	34B	Lake District - Central Fells	Cumbria	736	53	2,415	174	89 90	NY281074	Sim,Hew,N,W,B,Sy,Fel
97	184	Combe Head	Scafell Pike	34B	Lake District - Southern Fells	Cumbria	735	28	2,411	92	89 90	NY249109	N,sSim,B,Sy
98	143	Long Side	Skiddaw	34A	Lake District - Northern Fells	Cumbria	734	40	2,408	131	89 90	NY248284	Sim,Hew,N,W,B,Sy,Fel
99	230	Little Gowder Crag	Pillar	34B	Lake District - Western Fells	Cumbria	733	17	2,405	56	89	NY140109	N,B,Sy
100	248	Codale Head	High Raise	34B	Lake District - Central Fells	Cumbria	732	15	2,402	49	89 90	NY288090	N,B,Sy
101	148	Kentmere Pike	High Street	34C	Lake District - Far Eastern Fells	Cumbria	730	39	2,395	128	90	NY465077	Sim,Hew,N,W,B,Sy,Fel
102	101	Hindscarth	Dale Head	34B	Lake District - North Western Fells	Cumbria	727	71	2,385	233	89 90	NY215165	Sim,Hew,N,W,B,Sy,Fel
103	72	Ullscarf	High Raise	34B	Lake District - Central Fells	Cumbria	726	118	2,382	387	89 90	NY291121	Hu,Sim,Hew,N,W,B,Sy,Fel
104	81	Clough Head	Helvellyn	34C	Lake District - Eastern Fells	Cumbria	726	108	2,382	354	90	NY333225	Hu,Sim,Hew,N,W,B,Sy,Fel
105	10	Ingleborough		35B	Yorkshire Dales - Southern Fells	North Yorkshire	724	427	2,375	1,401	98	SD741745	Ma,Sim,Hew,N
106	187	Thunacar Knott	High Raise	34B	Lake District - Central Fells	Cumbria	723	27	2,372	89	89 90	NY279079	N,sSim,W,B,Sy,Fel
107	156	Red Beck Top	Scafell Pike	34B	Lake District - Southern Fells	Cumbria	721	37	2,365	121	89 90	NY242097	Sim,Hew,N,B,Sy
108	96	Froswick	High Street	34C	Lake District - Far Eastern Fells	Cumbria	720	75	2,362	246	90	NY435085	Sim,Hew,N,W,B,Sy,Fel
109	149	Whiteside East Top	Grisedale Pike	34B	Lake District - North Western Fells	Cumbria	719	39	2,359	128	89 90	NY175221	Sim,Hew,N,B,Sy
110	207	Birkhouse Moor	Helvellyn	34C	Lake District - Eastern Fells	Cumbria	718	21	2,356	69	90	NY363159	N,sSim,W,B,Sy,Fel
111	236	Harwood Common	Burnhope Seat	35A	North Pennines - Eastern Fells	Durham	718	16	2,356	52	91	NY795362	N
112	23	Great Shunner Fell		35A	Yorkshire Dales - Northern Fells	North Yorkshire	716	297	2,349	974	98	SD848972	Ma,Sim,Hew,N
113	114	Brandreth	Great Gable	34B	Lake District - Western Fells	Cumbria	715	61	2,346	200	89 90	NY214119	Sim,Hew,N,W,B,Sy,Fel
114	128	Lonscale Fell	Skiddaw	34A	Lake District - Northern Fells	Cumbria	715	50	2,346	164	89 90	NY285271	Sim,Hew,N,W,B,Sy,Fel
115	57	Hedgehope Hill	The Cheviot	33	The Cheviots	Northumberland	714	147	2,344	483	80	NT943197	Hu,Sim,Hew,N,sMa
116	63	Branstree	High Street	34C	Lake District - Far Eastern Fells	Cumbria	713	137	2,339	449	90	NY478099	Hu,Sim,Hew,N,W,B,Sy,Fel
117	32	Knott		34A	Lake District - Northern Fells	Cumbria	710	242	2,329	794	89 90	NY296329	Ma,Sim,Hew,N,W,B,Sy,Fel
118	166	Dead Stones	Burnhope Seat	35A	North Pennines - Eastern Fells	Cumbria/Durham	710	33	2,329	108	91	NY793399	Sim,Hew,N
119	78	High Seat	Great Shunner Fell	35A	Yorkshire Dales - Northern Fells	Cumbria/ North Yorkshire	709	112	2,326	367	91 92	NY802012	Hu,Sim,Hew,N
120	121	Pike of Stickle	High Raise	34B	Lake District - Central Fells	Cumbria	709	54	2,326	177	89 90	NY273073	Sim,Hew,N,W,B,Sy,Fel
121	136	Melmerby Fell	Cross Fell	35A	North Pennines - Western Fells	Cumbria	709	43	2,326	141	91	NY652380	Sim,Hew,N
122	19	Wild Boar Fell		35A	Yorkshire Dales - Northern Fells	Cumbria	708	344	2,323	1,129	98	SD758987	Ma,Sim,Hew,N
123	122	Great Stony Hill	Burnhope Seat	35A	North Pennines - Eastern Fells	Durham	708	54	2,323	177	91 92	NY823359	Sim,Hew,N
124	223	Whiteside	Grisedale Pike	34B	Lake District - North Western Fells	Cumbria	707	18	2,320	59	89 90	NY170219	N,W,B,Sy,Fel
125	150	Yoke	High Street	34C	Lake District - Far Eastern Fells	Cumbria	706	38	2,316	125	90	NY437067	Sim,Hew,N,W,B,Sy,Fel
126	43	Pike of Blisco		34B	Lake District - Southern Fells	Cumbria	705	177	2,313	581	89 90	NY271042	Ma,Sim,Hew,N,W,B,Sy,Fel
127	24	Great Whernside		35B	Yorkshire Dales - Southern Fells	North Yorkshire	704	288	2,310	945	98	SE002739	Ma,Sim,Hew,N
128	59	Chapelfell Top	Burnhope Seat	35A	North Pennines - Eastern Fells	Durham	703	142	2,306	466	91 92	NY875347	Hu,Sim,Hew,N,sMa
129	185	Ladyside Pike	Grisedale Pike	34B	Lake District - North Western Fells	Cumbria	703	28	2,306	92	89 90	NY184227	N,sSim,B,Sy
130	249	Middleboot Knotts	Scafell Pike	34B	Lake District - Southern Fells	Cumbria	703	15	2,306	49	89 90	NY213080	N,Sy
131	37	Buckden Pike		35B	Yorkshire Dales - Southern Fells	North Yorkshire	702	207	2,303	679	98	SD960787	Ma,Sim,Hew,N
132	89	Bowscale Fell	Blencathra	34A	Lake District - Northern Fells	Cumbria	702	87	2,303	285	90	NY333305	Sim,Hew,N,W,B,Sy,Fel
133	135	Cold Pike	Scafell Pike	34B	Lake District - Southern Fells	Cumbria	701	46	2,300	151	89 90	NY262036	Sim,Hew,N,W,B,Sy,Fel
134	250	Pavey Ark	High Raise	34B	Lake District - Central Fells	Cumbria	700	15	2,297	49	89 90	NY284079	N,W,B,Sy,Fel
135	189	Backstone Edge	Cross Fell	35A	North Pennines - Western Fells	Cumbria	699	26	2,293	85	91	NY725276	N,sSim
136	237	Gray Crag	High Street	34C	Lake District - Far Eastern Fells	Cumbria	699	16	2,293	52	90	NY427117	N,W,B,Sy,Fel
137	204	Caw Fell	Pillar	34B	Lake District - Western Fells	Cumbria	697	22	2,287	72	89	NY132109	N,sSim,W,B,Sy,Fel
138	238	Grey Knotts	Great Gable	34B	Lake District - Western Fells	Cumbria	697	16	2,287	52	89 90	NY217125	N,W,B,Sy,Fel
139	239	Fendrith Hill	Burnhope Seat	35A	North Pennines - Eastern Fells	Durham	697	16	2,287	52	91 92	NY877333	N
140	79	Rest Dodd	High Street	34C	Lake District - Far Eastern Fells	Cumbria	696	111	2,283	364	90	NY432136	Hu,Sim,Hew,N,W,B,Sy,Fel
141	251	Great Knott	Scafell Pike	34B	Lake District - Southern Fells	Cumbria	696	15	2,283	49	89 90	NY259042	N,B,Sy
142	186	Archy Styrigg	Great Shunner Fell	35A	Yorkshire Dales - Northern Fells	Cumbria/ North Yorkshire	695	28	2,280	92	91 92	NY802003	N,sSim
143	21	Pen-y-ghent		35B	Yorkshire Dales - Southern Fells	North Yorkshire	694	306	2,277	1,004	98	SD838733	Ma,Sim,Hew,N
144	39	Seatallan		34B	Lake District - Western Fells	Cumbria	692	193	2,270	633	89	NY140084	Ma,Sim,Hew,N,W,B,Sy,Fel
145	60	Great Calva	Knott	34A	Lake District - Northern Fells	Cumbria	690	142	2,264	466	89 90	NY290311	Hu,Sim,Hew,N,sMa,W,B,Sy,Fel
146	193	Hugh Seat	Great Shunner Fell	35A	Yorkshire Dales - Northern Fells	Cumbria/ North Yorkshire	689	24	2,260	79	98	SD809991	N,sSim
147	34	Great Coum		35B	Yorkshire Dales - Southern Fells	Cumbria	687	221	2,254	725	98	SD700835	Ma,Sim,Hew,N
148	102	Round Hill	Cross Fell	35A	North Pennines - Western Fells	Cumbria	686	71	2,251	233	91	NY744361	Sim,Hew,N
149	231	High House Tarn Top	Scafell Pike	34B	Lake District - Southern Fells	Cumbria	684	17	2,244	56	89 90	NY240092	N,B,Sy
150	157	Bannerdale Crags	Blencathra	34A	Lake District - Northern Fells	Cumbria	683	37	2,241	121	90	NY335290	Sim,Hew,N,W,B,Sy,Fel
151	213	Cold Pike West Top	Scafell Pike	34B	Lake District - Southern Fells	Cumbria	683	20	2,241	66	89 90	NY258035	N,sSim,Sy
152	95	Swarth Fell	Wild Boar Fell	35A	Yorkshire Dales - Northern Fells	Cumbria	681	76	2,234	249	98	SD755966	Sim,Hew,N
153	205	Loft Crag	High Raise	34B	Lake District - Central Fells	Cumbria	680	22	2,231	72	89 90	NY277071	N,sSim,W,B,Sy,Fel
154	116	Plover Hill	Pen-y-ghent	35B	Yorkshire Dales - Southern Fells	North Yorkshire	680	59	2,231	194	98	SD849752	Sim,Hew,N
155	27	Baugh Fell - Tarn Rigg Hill		35A	Yorkshire Dales - Northern Fells	Cumbria	678	265	2,224	869	98	SD740916	Ma,Sim,Hew,N
156	15	The Calf		35A	Yorkshire Dales - Northern Fells	Cumbria	676	383	2,218	1,257	98	SD667970	Ma,Sim,Hew,N
157	214	Knoutberry Haw	Baugh Fell - Tarn Rigg Hill	35A	Yorkshire Dales - Northern Fells	Cumbria	676	20	2,218	66	98	SD731919	N,sSim
158	224	Combe Door Top	Scafell Pike	34B	Lake District - Southern Fells	Cumbria	676	18	2,218	59	89 90	NY253108	N,Sy
159	163	Calders	The Calf	35A	Yorkshire Dales - Northern Fells	Cumbria	675	34	2,216	112	98	SD670960	Sim,Hew,N
160	85	Sheffield Pike	Helvellyn	34C	Lake District - Eastern Fells	Cumbria	675	91	2,215	299	90	NY369181	Sim,Hew,N,sHu,W,B,Sy,Fel
161	97	Murton Fell	Mickle Fell	35A	North Pennines - Western Fells	Cumbria	675	74	2,215	243	91	NY753246	Sim,Hew,N
162	106	Westernhope Moor	Burnhope Seat	35A	North Pennines - Eastern Fells	Durham	675	67	2,215	220	91 92	NY923325	Sim,Hew,N
163	53	Lovely Seat	Great Shunner Fell	35A	Yorkshire Dales - Northern Fells	North Yorkshire	675	149	2,214	489	98	SD879950	Hu,Sim,Hew,N,sMa
164	220	Wether Hill	High Street	34C	Lake District - Far Eastern Fells	Cumbria	674	19	2,211	62	90	NY454163	N,Sy
165	134	Killhope Law	Burnhope Seat	35A	North Pennines - Eastern Fells	Durham/ Northumberland	673	48	2,208	157	86 87	NY819448	Sim,Hew,N
166	194	Branstree NE Top	High Street	34C	Lake District - Far Eastern Fells	Cumbria	673	24	2,208	79	90	NY487103	N,sSim,B,Sy
167	30	Great Knoutberry Hill		35B	Yorkshire Dales - Southern Fells	Cumbria/ North Yorkshire	672	254	2,205	833	98	SD788871	Ma,Sim,Hew,N
168	38	Rogan's Seat		35A	Yorkshire Dales - Northern Fells	North Yorkshire	672	195	2,205	640	91 92	NY919030	Ma,Sim,Hew,N
169	120	Scar Crags	Grasmoor	34B	Lake District - North Western Fells	Cumbria	672	55	2,205	180	89 90	NY208206	Sim,Hew,N,W,B,Sy,Fel
170	129	Loadpot Hill	High Street	34C	Lake District - Far Eastern Fells	Cumbria	672	49	2,205	161	90	NY456180	Sim,Hew,N,W,B,Sy,Fel
171	252	Cold Pike Far West Top	Scafell Pike	34B	Lake District - Southern Fells	Cumbria	670	15	2,198	49	89 90	NY256037	N,Sy
172	31	Fountains Fell		35B	Yorkshire Dales - Southern Fells	North Yorkshire	668	243	2,192	797	98	SD864715	Ma,Sim,Hew,N
173	33	Dodd Fell Hill		35B	Yorkshire Dales - Southern Fells	North Yorkshire	668	232	2,192	761	98	SD841845	Ma,Sim,Hew,N
174	191	Water Crag	Rogan's Seat	35A	Yorkshire Dales - Northern Fells	North Yorkshire	668	25	2,192	82	91 92	NY928046	N,sSim
175	130	Little Fell	Great Shunner Fell	35A	Yorkshire Dales - Northern Fells	North Yorkshire	667	49	2,188	161	98	SD808971	Sim,Hew,N
176	225	Sale How	Skiddaw	34A	Lake District - Northern Fells	Cumbria	666	18	2,185	59	89 90	NY276286	N,B,Sy
177	47	Tarn Crag (Sleddale)		34C	Lake District - Far Eastern Fells	Cumbria	664	160	2,178	525	90	NY488078	Ma,Sim,Hew,N,W,B,Sy,Fel
178	87	Black Fell	Cross Fell	35A	North Pennines - Western Fells	Cumbria	664	89	2,178	292	86	NY648444	Sim,Hew,N
179	86	Carrock Fell	Knott	34A	Lake District - Northern Fells	Cumbria	663	91	2,175	299	90	NY341336	Sim,Hew,N,sHu,W,B,Sy,Fel
180	50	Nine Standards Rigg		35A	Yorkshire Dales - Northern Fells	Cumbria	662	157	2,172	515	91 92	NY825060	Ma,Sim,Hew,N
181	253	Fountains Fell South Top	Fountains Fell	35B	Yorkshire Dales - Southern Fells	North Yorkshire	662	15	2,172	49	98	SD868707	N
182	159	Whiteless Pike	Grasmoor	34B	Lake District - North Western Fells	Cumbria	660	36	2,165	118	89 90	NY180189	Sim,Hew,N,W,B,Sy,Fel
183	104	High Pike (Caldbeck)	Knott	34A	Lake District - Northern Fells	Cumbria	658	69	2,159	226	90	NY318350	Sim,Hew,N,W,B,Sy,Fel
184	240	Long Man Hill	Cross Fell	35A	North Pennines - Western Fells	Cumbria	658	16	2,159	52	91	NY723373	N
185	28	Place Fell		34C	Lake District - Far Eastern Fells	Cumbria	657	262	2,155	860	90	NY405169	Ma,Sim,Hew,N,W,B,Sy,Fel
186	144	Grey Nag	Cross Fell	35A	North Pennines - Western Fells	Northumberland	656	40	2,152	131	86	NY664476	Sim,Hew,N
187	208	Low Saddle	High Raise	34B	Lake District - Central Fells	Cumbria	656	21	2,152	69	89 90	NY288133	N,sSim,B,Sy
188	160	Selside Pike	High Street	34C	Lake District - Far Eastern Fells	Cumbria	655	36	2,149	118	90	NY490111	Sim,Hew,N,W,B,Sy,Fel
189	26	Harter Fell (Eskdale)		34D	Lake District - Southern Fells	Cumbria	654	276	2,146	906	96	SD218997	Ma,Sim,Hew,N,W,B,Sy,Fel
190	56	High Spy	Dale Head	34B	Lake District - North Western Fells	Cumbria	653	148	2,143	485	89 90	NY234162	Hu,Sim,Hew,N,sMa,W,B,Sy,Fel
191	103	Comb Fell	The Cheviot	33	The Cheviots	Northumberland	653	70	2,141	230	80	NT924187	Sim,Hew,N
192	145	Rossett Pike	Scafell Pike	34B	Lake District - Southern Fells	Cumbria	651	40	2,136	131	89 90	NY249075	Sim,Hew,N,W,B,Sy,Fel
193	180	Three Pikes	Burnhope Seat	35A	North Pennines - Eastern Fells	Durham	651	30	2,136	98	91 92	NY835343	Sim,Hew,N
194	162	Simon Fell	Ingleborough	35B	Yorkshire Dales - Southern Fells	North Yorkshire	650	35	2,133	115	98	SD754751	Sim,Hew,N
195	107	Viewing Hill	Burnhope Seat	35A	North Pennines - Western Fells	Durham	649	66	2,129	217	91	NY789331	Sim,Hew,N
196	71	Fleetwith Pike	Great Gable	34B	Lake District - Western Fells	Cumbria	649	118	2,129	388	89 90	NY205141	Hu,Sim,Hew,N,W,B,Sy,Fel
197	151	Base Brown	Great Gable	34B	Lake District - Western Fells	Cumbria	646	38	2,119	125	89 90	NY225114	Sim,Hew,N,W,B,Sy,Fel
198	92	Yockenthwaite Moor	Dodd Fell Hill	35B	Yorkshire Dales - Southern Fells	North Yorkshire	643	86	2,110	282	98	SD909810	Sim,Hew,N
199	254	Little Calva	Knott	34A	Lake District - Northern Fells	Cumbria	642	15	2,106	49	89 90	NY282314	N,B,Sy
200	215	Dodd (Buttermere)	High Stile	34B	Lake District - Western Fells	Cumbria	641	20	2,103	66	89	NY163157	N,sSim,B,Sy
201	123	Iron Crag	Pillar	34B	Lake District - Western Fells	Cumbria	640	54	2,100	177	89	NY123119	Sim,Hew,N,B,Sy,Fel
202	90	Fell Head	The Calf	35A	Yorkshire Dales - Northern Fells	Cumbria	640	86	2,099	282	97	SD649981	Sim,Hew,N
203	36	Yarlside		35A	Yorkshire Dales - Northern Fells	Cumbria	639	208	2,096	682	98	SD685985	Ma,Sim,Hew,N
204	141	Grey Crag	Tarn Crag (Sleddale)	34C	Lake District - Far Eastern Fells	Cumbria	638	41	2,093	135	90	NY497072	Sim,Hew,N,W,B,Sy,Fel
205	146	Causey Pike	Grasmoor	34B	Lake District - North Western Fells	Cumbria	637	40	2,090	131	89 90	NY218208	Sim,Hew,N,W,B,Sy,Fel
206	165	Little Hart Crag	Fairfield	34C	Lake District - Eastern Fells	Cumbria	637	34	2,090	112	90	NY387100	Sim,Hew,N,W,B,Sy,Fel
207	241	Harrop Pike	Tarn Crag (Sleddale)	34C	Lake District - Far Eastern Fells	Cumbria	637	16	2,090	52	90	NY500077	N,B,Sy
208	255	Tom Smith's Stone Top	Cross Fell	35A	North Pennines - Western Fells	Northumberland	637	15	2,090	49	86	NY655466	N
209	8	Kinder Scout		36	The Peak District	Derbyshire	636	497	2,088	1,629	110	SK084875	Ma,Sim,Hew,N,CoH,CoU,CoA
210	188	Fiend's Fell	Cross Fell	35A	North Pennines - Western Fells	Cumbria	634	27	2,080	89	86	NY643406	N,sSim
211	209	Honister Crag	Great Gable	34B	Lake District - Western Fells	Cumbria	634	21	2,080	69	89 90	NY212141	N,sSim,B,Sy
212	242	High Spy North Top	Dale Head	34B	Lake District - North Western Fells	Cumbria	634	16	2,080	52	89 90	NY236171	N,Sy
213	256	Hobcarton End	Grisedale Pike	34B	Lake District - North Western Fells	Cumbria	634	15	2,080	49	89 90	NY195234	N,B,Sy
214	67	Bleaklow Head	Kinder Scout	36	The Peak District	Derbyshire	633	128	2,077	420	110	SK094960	Hu,Sim,Hew,N
215	99	Starling Dodd	High Stile	34B	Lake District - Western Fells	Cumbria	633	73	2,077	239	89	NY142157	Sim,Hew,N,W,B,Sy,Fel
216	152	Dovenest Top	Scafell Pike	34B	Lake District - Southern Fells	Cumbria	632	38	2,073	125	89 90	NY255113	Sim,Hew,N,B,Sy
217	175	Seathwaite Fell	Scafell Pike	34B	Lake District - Southern Fells	Cumbria	632	31	2,073	102	89 90	NY227097	Sim,Hew,N,B,Sy
218	232	Seathwaite Fell South Top	Scafell Pike	34B	Lake District - Southern Fells	Cumbria	631	17	2,070	56	89 90	NY227094	N,Sy
219	167	Rough Crag (Riggindale)	High Street	34C	Lake District - Far Eastern Fells	Cumbria	628	33	2,060	108	90	NY454112	Sim,Hew,N,B,Sy
220	169	Gragareth	Great Coum	35B	Yorkshire Dales - Southern Fells	Lancashire	628	33	2,060	108	98	SD688793	Sim,Hew,N,CoU,CoA
221	195	Green Hill	Great Coum	35B	Yorkshire Dales - Southern Fells	Cumbria/ Lancashire	628	24	2,059	79	98	SD701820	N,sSim
222	61	Yewbarrow	Pillar	34B	Lake District - Western Fells	Cumbria	627	142	2,057	466	89 90	NY173084	Hu,Sim,Hew,N,sMa,W,B,Sy,Fel
223	216	Looking Stead (Pillar)	Pillar	34B	Lake District - Western Fells	Cumbria	627	20	2,057	66	89 90	NY186117	N,sSim,B,Sy
224	243	Hare Stones	Knott	34A	Lake District - Northern Fells	Cumbria	627	16	2,057	52	90	NY315343	N,B,Sy
225	65	Randygill Top	Yarlside	35A	Yorkshire Dales - Northern Fells	Cumbria	624	131	2,047	430	91	NY687000	Hu,Sim,Hew,N
226	147	Darnbrook Fell	Fountains Fell	35B	Yorkshire Dales - Southern Fells	North Yorkshire	624	40	2,047	131	98	SD884727	Sim,Hew,N
227	219	Tinside Rigg	Mickle Fell	35A	North Pennines - Western Fells	Cumbria	624	19	2,047	63	91	NY775199	N
228	233	Long Fell	Mickle Fell	35A	North Pennines - Western Fells	Cumbria	624	17	2,046	54	91	NY768198	N
229	226	Bush Howe	The Calf	35A	Yorkshire Dales - Northern Fells	Cumbria	623	18	2,044	59	97	SD659980	N
230	217	Birks	St Sunday Crag	34C	Lake District - Eastern Fells	Cumbria	622	20	2,041	66	90	NY380143	N,sSim,W,B,Sy,Fel
231	6	High Willhays		40	Dartmoor	Devon	621	537	2,037	1,762	191	SX580892	Ma,Sim,Hew,N,CoH,CoU,CoA
232	45	Cold Fell		35A	North Pennines - Western Fells	Cumbria	621	168	2,037	551	86	NY605556	Ma,Sim,Hew,N
233	201	Heron Pike North Top	Fairfield	34C	Lake District - Eastern Fells	Cumbria	621	23	2,037	75	90	NY357086	N,sSim,B,Sy,Fel
234	244	Walna Scar	The Old Man of Coniston	34D	Lake District - Southern Fells	Cumbria	621	16	2,037	52	96	SD257963	N,WO,B,Sy,Fel
235	257	Higher Shelf Stones	Kinder Scout	36	The Peak District	Derbyshire	621	15	2,037	49	110	SK088947	N
236	182	Bellbeaver Rigg	Burnhope Seat	35A	North Pennines - Western Fells	Cumbria	620	29	2,034	94	91	NY762350	N,sSim
237	137	Bink Moss	Mickle Fell	35A	North Pennines - Western Fells	Durham	619	43	2,031	141	91 92	NY875242	Sim,Hew,N
238	196	Yes Tor	High Willhays	40	Dartmoor	Devon	619	24	2,031	79	191	SX580901	N,sSim
239	75	Windy Gyle	The Cheviot	33	The Cheviots	Northumberland/ Scottish Borders	619	113	2,031	371	80	NT855152	Hu,Sim,Hew,N,D
240	197	Hartsop Dodd	Stony Cove Pike	34C	Lake District - Far Eastern Fells	Cumbria	618	24	2,028	79	90	NY411118	N,sSim,W,B,Sy,Fel
241	55	Cushat Law	The Cheviot	33	The Cheviots	Northumberland	616	148	2,022	485	80	NT928137	Hu,Sim,Hew,N,sMa
242	76	Great Borne	High Stile	34B	Lake District - Western Fells	Cumbria	616	113	2,021	371	89	NY123163	Hu,Sim,Hew,N,W,B,Sy,Fel
243	168	Yewbarrow North Top	Pillar	34B	Lake District - Western Fells	Cumbria	616	33	2,021	108	89 90	NY175091	Sim,Hew,N,B,Sy
244	227	Great Lingy Hill	Knott	34A	Lake District - Northern Fells	Cumbria	616	18	2,021	59	90	NY310339	N,B,Sy
245	108	Drumaldrace	Dodd Fell Hill	35B	Yorkshire Dales - Southern Fells	North Yorkshire	614	66	2,014	217	98	SD873867	Sim,Hew,N
246	138	Flinty Fell	Burnhope Seat	35A	North Pennines - Eastern Fells	Cumbria	614	43	2,014	141	86 87	NY770422	Sim,Hew,N
247	176	The Dodd	Burnhope Seat	35A	North Pennines - Eastern Fells	Northumberland	614	31	2,014	102	86 87	NY791457	Sim,Hew,N
248	153	Middlehope Moor	Burnhope Seat	35A	North Pennines - Eastern Fells	Durham/ Northumberland	612	38	2,008	125	87	NY862432	Sim,Hew,N
249	198	Rosthwaite Fell	Scafell Pike	34B	Lake District - Southern Fells	Cumbria	612	24	2,008	79	89 90	NY255118	N,sSim,B,Sy
250	210	Heron Pike (Rydal)	Fairfield	34C	Lake District - Eastern Fells	Cumbria	612	21	2,008	69	90	NY355083	N,sSim,W,B,Sy
251	218	Miller Moss	Knott	34A	Lake District - Northern Fells	Cumbria	610	20	2,002	65	90	NY303338	N, B,Sy
252	49	Birks Fell		35B	Yorkshire Dales - Southern Fells	North Yorkshire	610	158	2,001	518	98	SD918763	Ma,Sim,Hew,N
253	202	White Maiden	The Old Man of Coniston	34D	Lake District - Southern Fells	Cumbria	610	23	2,001	75	96	SD254957	N,sSim,B,Sy
254	228	Bullman Hills	Cross Fell	35A	North Pennines - Western Fells	Cumbria	610	18	2,001	59	91	NY705373	N
255	74	Bloodybush Edge	The Cheviot	33	The Cheviots	Northumberland	610	114	2,001	373	80	NT902143	Hu,Sim,Hew,N
256	117	Thack Moor	Cross Fell	35A	North Pennines - Western Fells	Cumbria	610	58	2,000	190	86	NY611462	Sim,Hew,N
257	20	Calf Top		35B	Yorkshire Dales - Southern Fells	Cumbria	610	313	2,000	1,027	98	SD664856	Ma,Sim,Hew,N

== Nuttall mountains in Wales by height ==
This list is from the Database of British and Irish Hills ("DoBIH") in October 2018, and are peaks the DoBIH marks as being Welsh, and Nuttalls ("N"). (Note: The Database of British and Irish Hills ("DoBIH") is the most referenced database for the classification of peaks in the British Isles, and the DoBIH is licensed under a "Creative Commons Attribution 3.0 Unported License".) John and Anne Nuttall update the list of Nuttalls from time to time, and the DoBIH also updates their measurements as more surveys are recorded, so these tables should not be amended or updated unless the entire DoBIH data is re-downloaded again. No 150 Black Mountain South top is no longer a Nuttall.

Nuttalls in Wales, ranked by height (DoBIH, October 2018)
Height Rank	Prom. Rank	Name	Parent Name	Map Sec.	Area (Nuttalls)	County	Height (m)	Prom. (m)	Height (ft)	Prom. (ft)	Topo Map	OS Grid Reference	Classification (§ DoBIH codes)
1	1	Snowdon		30B	Snowdon	Gwynedd	1,085	1,039	3,560	3,409	115	SH609543	Ma,F,Sim,Hew,N, CoH,CoU,CoA
2	88	Crib y Ddysgl	Snowdon	30B	Snowdon	Gwynedd	1,065	72	3,495	236	115	SH610551	F,Sim,Hew,N
3	2	Carnedd Llewelyn		30B	The Carneddau	Conwy/ Gwynedd	1,064	750	3,491	2,461	115	SH683643	Ma,F,Sim,Hew,N,CoU
4	64	Carnedd Dafydd	Carnedd Llewelyn	30B	The Carneddau	Conwy/ Gwynedd	1,044	111	3,425	364	115	SH662630	Hu,F,Sim,Hew,N
5	5	Glyder Fawr		30B	The Glyders	Conwy/ Gwynedd	1,001	642	3,284	2,106	115	SH642579	Ma,F,Sim,Hew,N
6	84	Glyder Fach	Glyder Fawr	30B	The Glyders	Conwy	994	75	3,262	244	115	SH656582	F,Sim,Hew,N
7	116	Pen yr Ole Wen	Carnedd Llewelyn	30B	The Carneddau	Conwy/ Gwynedd	978	45	3,209	148	115	SH655619	F,Sim,Hew,N
8	122	Foel Grach	Carnedd Llewelyn	30B	The Carneddau	Conwy/ Gwynedd	975	42	3,200	137	115	SH688659	F,Sim,Hew,N
9	177	Castell y Gwynt	Glyder Fawr	30B	The Glyders	Conwy	972	16	3,189	52	115	SH653581	N
10	103	Yr Elen	Carnedd Llewelyn	30B	The Carneddau	Gwynedd	962	57	3,156	187	115	SH673651	F,Sim,Hew,N
11	34	Y Garn		30B	The Glyders	Gwynedd	947	236	3,107	774	115	SH630595	Ma,F,Sim,Hew,N
12	97	Foel-fras	Carnedd Llewelyn	30B	The Carneddau	Conwy/ Gwynedd	944	63	3,097	206	115	SH696681	F,Sim,Hew,N
13	132	Garnedd Uchaf	Carnedd Llewelyn	30B	The Carneddau	Gwynedd	925	33	3,035	108	115	SH686669	F,Sim,Hew,N
14	37	Elidir Fawr		30B	The Glyders	Gwynedd	924	212	3,031	696	115	SH611612	Ma,F,Sim,Hew,N
15	93	Crib Goch	Snowdon	30B	Snowdon	Gwynedd	923	65	3,028	213	115	SH624551	F,Sim,Hew,N
16	42	Tryfan		30B	The Glyders	Conwy	918	191	3,010	627	115	SH664593	Ma,F,Sim,Hew,N
17	4	Aran Fawddwy		30E	The Arans	Gwynedd	905	670	2,969	2,198	124 125	SH862223	Ma,Sim,Hew,N,CoH
18	52	Y Lliwedd		30B	Snowdon	Gwynedd	898	154	2,946	505	115	SH622533	Ma,Sim,Hew,N
19	182	Y Lliwedd East Top	Y Lliwedd	30B	Snowdon	Gwynedd	893	15	2,930	49	115	SH624532	N
20	7	Cadair Idris		30F	Cadair Idris	Gwynedd	893	608	2,929	1,995	124	SH711130	Ma,Sim,Hew,N
21	3	Pen y Fan		32A	Brecon Beacons	Powys	886	672	2,907	2,205	160	SO012215	Ma,Sim,Hew,N,CoH,CoU,CoA
22	111	Aran Benllyn	Aran Fawddwy	30E	The Arans	Gwynedd	885	50	2,904	164	124 125	SH867242	Sim,Hew,N
23	140	Corn Du	Pen y Fan	32A	Brecon Beacons	Powys	873	28	2,864	92	160	SO007213	N,sSim
24	8	Moel Siabod		30B	The Moelwyns	Conwy	872	600	2,862	1,968	115	SH705546	Ma,Sim,Hew,N
25	125	Erw y Ddafad-ddu	Aran Fawddwy	30E	The Arans	Gwynedd	872	37	2,861	121	124 125	SH864233	Sim,Hew,N
26	92	Mynydd Moel	Cadair Idris	30F	Cadair Idris	Gwynedd	863	67	2,831	220	124	SH727136	Sim,Hew,N
27	12	Arenig Fawr		30D	The Arenigs	Gwynedd	854	479	2,802	1,572	124 125	SH827369	Ma,Sim,Hew,N
28	87	Llwytmor	Carnedd Llewelyn	30B	The Carneddau	Gwynedd	849	73	2,785	239	115	SH689692	Sim,Hew,N
29	76	Pen yr Helgi Du	Carnedd Llewelyn	30B	The Carneddau	Conwy	833	85	2,732	278	115	SH697630	Sim,Hew,N
30	20	Cadair Berwyn		30E	The Berwyns	Powys	832	346	2,730	1,135	125	SJ071323	Ma,Sim,Hew,N,CoH,CoA
31	82	Foel-goch	Y Garn	30B	The Glyders	Gwynedd	831	76	2,726	249	115	SH628612	Sim,Hew,N
32	183	Arenig Fawr South Top	Arenig Fawr	30D	The Arenigs	Gwynedd	830	15	2,723	49	124 125	SH826366	N
33	165	Cadair Berwyn North Top	Cadair Berwyn	30E	The Berwyns	Denbighshire/ Powys	827	19	2,713	62	125	SJ072327	N
34	131	Moel Sych	Cadair Berwyn	30E	The Berwyns	Denbighshire/ Powys	827	34	2,712	111	125	SJ066318	Sim,Hew,N,CoH,CoU
35	175	Craig Gwaun Taf	Pen y Fan	32A	Brecon Beacons	Powys	826	16	2,711	53	160	SO005207	N
36	83	Carnedd y Filiast	Elidir Fawr	30B	The Glyders	Gwynedd	821	76	2,694	249	115	SH620627	Sim,Hew,N
37	178	Lliwedd Bach	Y Lliwedd	30B	Snowdon	Gwynedd	818	16	2,684	52	115	SH627532	N
38	162	Mynydd Perfedd	Elidir Fawr	30B	The Glyders	Gwynedd	813	20	2,667	66	115	SH623618	N,sSim
40	6	Waun Fach		32A	Black Mountains	Powys	811	622	2,661	2,041	161	SO215299	Ma,Sim,Hew,N
39	127	Cyfrwy	Cadair Idris	30F	Cadair Idris	Gwynedd	811	36	2,661	118	124	SH703133	Sim,Hew,N
41	170	Bera Bach	Carnedd Llewelyn	30B	The Carneddau	Gwynedd	807	18	2,646	58	115	SH672677	N
42	96	Y Foel Goch	Glyder Fawr	30B	The Glyders	Conwy	805	63	2,641	207	115	SH677582	Sim,Hew,N
43	15	Fan Brycheiniog		32A	Brecon Beacons	Powys	803	425	2,633	1,394	160	SN824220	Ma,Sim,Hew,N
45	113	Pen y Gadair Fawr	Waun Fach	32A	Black Mountains	Powys	800	47	2,625	154	161	SO229287	Sim,Hew,N
44	184	Foel Meirch	Carnedd Llewelyn	30B	The Carneddau	Gwynedd	800	15	2,625	49	115	SH658637	N
46	44	Pen Llithrig y Wrach		30B	The Carneddau	Conwy	799	180	2,620	592	115	SH716622	Ma,Sim,Hew,N
47	59	Cribyn	Pen y Fan	32A	Brecon Beacons	Powys	795	130	2,608	427	160	SO023213	Hu,Sim,Hew,N
48	136	Bera Mawr	Carnedd Llewelyn	30B	The Carneddau	Gwynedd	794	30	2,604	97	115	SH674682	N,sSim
49	80	Craig Cwm Amarch	Cadair Idris	30F	Cadair Idris	Gwynedd	792	79	2,598	260	124	SH710121	Sim,Hew,N
50	86	Cadair Bronwen	Cadair Berwyn	30E	The Berwyns	Denbighshire/ Wrexham	783	73	2,570	240	125	SJ077346	Sim,Hew,N
51	9	Moel Hebog		30B	Moel Hebog	Gwynedd	783	585	2,569	1,919	115	SH564469	Ma,Sim,Hew,N
52	36	Glasgwm		30E	The Arans	Gwynedd	779	215	2,556	705	124 125	SH836194	Ma,Sim,Hew,N
53	112	Drum	Carnedd Llewelyn	30B	The Carneddau	Conwy/ Gwynedd	771	48	2,529	159	115	SH708695	Sim,Hew,N
54	17	Moelwyn Mawr		30B	The Moelwyns	Gwynedd	770	385	2,526	1,263	124	SH658448	Ma,Sim,Hew,N
55	50	Waun Rydd		32A	Brecon Beacons	Powys	769	170	2,524	558	160	SO062206	Ma,Sim,Hew,N
56	121	Gallt yr Ogof	Glyder Fawr	30B	The Glyders	Conwy	763	42	2,503	138	115	SH685585	Sim,Hew,N
57	120	Fan Hir	Fan Brycheiniog	32A	Brecon Beacons	Powys	760	43	2,493	140	160	SN830209	Sim,Hew,N
58	126	Drosgl	Carnedd Llewelyn	30B	The Carneddau	Gwynedd	757	37	2,483	120	115	SH663679	Sim,Hew,N
59	10	Y Llethr		30D	The Rhinogs	Gwynedd	756	561	2,480	1,841	124	SH661257	Ma,Sim,Hew,N
60	167	Bwlch y Ddwyallt	Waun Rydd	32A	Brecon Beacons	Powys	754	18	2,474	59	160	SO055203	N
61	11	Pumlumon Fawr		31A	Central Wales - Pumlumon	Cardiganshire	752	526	2,467	1,726	135	SN789869	Ma,Sim,Hew,N,CoH,CoU
62	38	Moel Llyfnant		30D	The Arenigs	Gwynedd	751	206	2,464	676	124 125	SH808351	Ma,Sim,Hew,N
63	55	Diffwys	Y Llethr	30D	The Rhinogs	Gwynedd	750	148	2,462	484	124	SH661234	Hu,Sim,Hew,N,sMa
64	72	Bannau Sir Gaer	Fan Brycheiniog	32A	Brecon Beacons	Carmarthenshire	749	93	2,458	306	160	SN811218	Sim,Hew,N,sHu
65	35	Yr Aran		30B	Snowdon	Gwynedd	747	235	2,451	771	115	SH604515	Ma,Sim,Hew,N
66	95	Pen Pumlumon Arwystli	Pumlumon Fawr	31A	Central Wales - Pumlumon	Cardiganshire	741	64	2,431	210	135 136	SN814877	Sim,Hew,N
67	160	Tomle	Cadair Berwyn	30E	The Berwyns	Powys/ Wrexham	741	21	2,430	69	125	SJ085335	N,sSim
68	161	Craig Eigiau	Carnedd Llewelyn	30B	The Carneddau	Conwy	735	21	2,411	69	115	SH713654	N,sSim
69	16	Craig Cwm Silyn		30B	Moel Hebog	Gwynedd	734	398	2,408	1,306	115	SH525502	Ma,Sim,Hew,N
70	24	Rhobell Fawr		30D	The Arenigs	Gwynedd	734	309	2,408	1,014	124	SH786256	Ma,Sim,Hew,N
71	25	Fan Fawr		32A	Brecon Beacons	Powys	734	295	2,408	968	160	SN969193	Ma,Sim,Hew,N
72	128	Pen Pumlumon Llygad-bychan	Pumlumon Fawr	31A	Central Wales - Pumlumon	Cardiganshire	727	36	2,385	118	135	SN798871	Sim,Hew,N
73	31	Moel Eilio		30B	Snowdon	Gwynedd	726	259	2,382	850	115	SH555577	Ma,Sim,Hew,N
74	27	Fan Gyhirych		32A	Brecon Beacons	Powys	725	280	2,379	919	160	SN880191	Ma,Sim,Hew,N
77	19	Rhinog Fawr		30D	The Rhinogs	Gwynedd	720	363	2,362	1,191	124	SH656290	Ma,Sim,Hew,N
78	70	Pen Allt-mawr	Waun Fach	32A	Black Mountains	Powys	720	102	2,362	335	161	SO206243	Hu,Sim,Hew,N
76	141	Llechog	Snowdon	30B	Snowdon	Gwynedd	720	28	2,362	92	115	SH606567	N,sSim
75	176	Carnedd y Filiast North Top	Elidir Fawr	30B	The Glyders	Gwynedd	720	16	2,362	53	115	SH617631	N
79	139	Fan y Big	Waun Rydd	32A	Brecon Beacons	Powys	717	29	2,351	94	160	SO036206	N,sSim
80	155	Rhos Dirion	Waun Fach	32A	Black Mountains	Powys	713	22	2,339	72	161	SO211333	N,sSim
82	54	Rhinog Fach	Y Llethr	30D	The Rhinogs	Gwynedd	712	148	2,336	486	124	SH664270	Hu,Sim,Hew,N,sMa
81	168	Arenig Fawr South Ridge Top	Arenig Fawr	30D	The Arenigs	Gwynedd	712	18	2,336	59	124 125	SH827359	N
83	60	Moelwyn Bach	Moelwyn Mawr	30B	The Moelwyns	Gwynedd	710	124	2,329	407	124	SH660437	Hu,Sim,Hew,N
84	39	Trum y Ddysgl		30B	Moel Hebog	Gwynedd	709	204	2,326	669	115	SH544516	Ma,Sim,Hew,N
85	53	Black Mountain		32A	Black Mountains	Herefordshire/ Powys	703	154	2,306	505	161	SO255350	Ma,Sim,Hew,N,CoH,CoU,CoA
86	109	Pen Cerrig-calch	Waun Fach	32A	Black Mountains	Powys	701	52	2,300	171	161	SO216224	Sim,Hew,N
87	147	Garnedd-goch	Craig Cwm Silyn	30B	Moel Hebog	Gwynedd	700	25	2,297	82	115	SH511495	N,sSim
89	13	Mynydd Mawr		30B	Moel Hebog	Gwynedd	698	463	2,290	1,519	115	SH539546	Ma,Sim,Hew,N
88	33	Allt-Fawr		30B	The Moelwyns	Gwynedd	698	243	2,290	797	115	SH681474	Ma,Sim,Hew,N
90	104	Mynydd Drws-y-coed	Trum y Ddysgl	30B	Moel Hebog	Gwynedd	695	57	2,280	187	115	SH548518	Sim,Hew,N
91	151	Moel yr Ewig	Cadair Berwyn	30E	The Berwyns	Powys	695	24	2,279	79	125	SJ080317	N,sSim
92	102	Foel Wen	Cadair Berwyn	30E	The Berwyns	Powys/ Wrexham	691	59	2,266	193	125	SJ099334	Sim,Hew,N
93	81	Twmpa	Waun Fach	32A	Black Mountains	Powys	690	79	2,264	259	161	SO224350	Sim,Hew,N
96	26	Arenig Fach		30D	The Arenigs	Gwynedd	689	294	2,260	965	124 125	SH820415	Ma,Sim,Hew,N
94	67	Cnicht	Allt-Fawr	30B	The Moelwyns	Gwynedd	689	104	2,260	341	115	SH645466	Hu,Sim,Hew,N
97	77	Foel Hafod-fynydd	Aran Fawddwy	30E	The Arans	Gwynedd	689	84	2,260	276	124 125	SH877227	Sim,Hew,N
95	152	Craigysgafn	Moelwyn Mawr	30B	The Moelwyns	Gwynedd	689	24	2,260	79	124	SH659443	N,sSim
98	169	Cnicht North Top	Allt-Fawr	30B	The Moelwyns	Gwynedd	688	18	2,257	59	115	SH648468	N
99	157	Foel Wen South Top	Cadair Berwyn	30E	The Berwyns	Powys/ Wrexham	688	22	2,257	71	125	SJ102330	N,sSim
100	119	Gwaun y Llwyni	Aran Fawddwy	30E	The Arans	Gwynedd	685	43	2,247	141	124 125	SH857204	Sim,Hew,N
101	90	Pen y Brynfforchog	Glasgwm	30E	The Arans	Gwynedd	685	71	2,247	233	124 125	SH817179	Sim,Hew,N
102	108	Y Garn	Pumlumon Fawr	31A	Central Wales - Pumlumon	Cardiganshire	684	56	2,244	184	135	SN775851	Sim,Hew,N
103	146	Gau Graig		30F	Cadair Idris	Gwynedd	684	25	2,243	83	124	SH743140	N,sSim
104	137	Crib-y-rhiw	Y Llethr	30D	The Rhinogs	Gwynedd	681	29	2,235	95	124	SH663248	N,sSim
105	118	Mynydd Tarw	Cadair Berwyn	30E	The Berwyns	Powys/ Wrexham	679	44	2,229	145	125	SJ112324	Sim,Hew,N
106	150	Godor	Cadair Berwyn	30E	The Berwyns	Powys	679	25	2,228	82	125	SJ094307	N,sSim
107	89	Chwarel y Fan	Waun Fach	32A	Black Mountains	Monmouthshire	679	72	2,228	236	161	SO258294	Sim,Hew,N,CoH,CoU,CoA
108	21	Maesglase		30F	Cadair Idris	Gwynedd	679	318	2,226	1,044	124 125	SH817150	Ma,Sim,Hew,N
109	30	Creigiau Gleision		30B	The Carneddau	Conwy	678	262	2,224	860	115	SH728615	Ma,Sim,Hew,N
110	185	Waun Lefrith	Fan Brycheiniog	32A	Brecon Beacons	Carmarthenshire	677	15	2,221	49	160	SN798214	N
111	99	Moel Druman	Allt-Fawr	30B	The Moelwyns	Gwynedd	676	61	2,218	200	115	SH671476	Sim,Hew,N
112	171	Godor North Top	Cadair Berwyn	30E	The Berwyns	Powys	675	17	2,215	56	125	SJ089311	N
113	48	Moel Cynghorion		30B	Snowdon	Gwynedd	674	176	2,211	577	115	SH586563	Ma,Sim,Hew,N
114	105	Ysgafell Wen	Allt-Fawr	30B	The Moelwyns	Conwy	672	57	2,205	187	115	SH666481	Sim,Hew,N
115	51	Esgeiriau Gwynion		30E	The Arans	Gwynedd	671	166	2,201	545	124 125	SH889236	Ma,Sim,Hew,N
116	61	Waun-oer	Maesglase	30F	Cadair Idris	Gwynedd	670	120	2,198	394	124	SH785147	Hu,Sim,Hew,N
118	22	Carnedd y Filiast		30D	The Arenigs	Conwy/ Gwynedd	669	316	2,195	1,037	124 125	SH871445	Ma,Sim,Hew,N
117	133	Ysgafell Wen North Top	Allt-Fawr	30B	The Moelwyns	Gwynedd	669	33	2,195	108	115	SH663485	Sim,Hew,N
119	179	Fan Fraith	Fan Gyhirych	32A	Brecon Beacons	Powys	668	16	2,192	52	160	SN887183	N
121	14	Tarren y Gesail		30F	Cadair Idris	Gwynedd	667	463	2,188	1,519	124	SH710058	Ma,Sim,Hew,N
120	47	Cyrniau Nod		30E	The Berwyns	Powys	667	179	2,188	587	125	SH988279	Ma,Sim,Hew,N
122	100	Post Gwyn	Cadair Berwyn	30E	The Berwyns	Powys	665	60	2,182	197	125	SJ047293	Sim,Hew,N
123	166	Pumlumon Fach	Pumlumon Fawr	31A	Central Wales - Pumlumon	Cardiganshire	664	19	2,178	62	135	SN787874	N
124	49	Fan Nedd		32A	Brecon Beacons	Powys	663	174	2,175	571	160	SN913184	Ma,Sim,Hew,N
125	124	Mynydd Llysiau	Waun Fach	32A	Black Mountains	Powys	663	40	2,175	131	161	SO207279	Sim,Hew,N
126	56	Dduallt	Rhobell Fawr	30D	The Arenigs	Gwynedd	662	138	2,172	453	124 125	SH810273	Hu,Sim,Hew,N
127	29	Manod Mawr		30D	The Moelwyns	Gwynedd	661	266	2,169	873	124	SH724446	Ma,Sim,Hew,N
128	69	Craig-las	Cadair Idris	30F	Cadair Idris	Gwynedd	661	103	2,169	338	124	SH677135	Hu,Sim,Hew,N
129	18	Great Rhos		31B	Central Wales - Radnor Forest	Powys	660	379	2,165	1,243	148	SO182638	Ma,Sim,Hew,N,CoH
130	180	Y Groes Fagl	Cyrniau Nod	30E	The Berwyns	Gwynedd	659	16	2,162	51	125	SH988290	N
131	186	Foel Rhudd	Esgeiriau Gwynion	30E	The Arans	Gwynedd	659	15	2,162	49	124 125	SH895239	N
132	164	Ysgafell Wen Far North Top	Allt-Fawr	30B	The Moelwyns	Conwy/ Gwynedd	659	19	2,162	63	115	SH663487	N
133	73	Cribin Fawr	Maesglase	30F	Cadair Idris	Gwynedd	659	93	2,161	305	124	SH794152	Sim,Hew,N,sHu
134	94	Manod Mawr North Top	Manod Mawr	30D	The Moelwyns	Gwynedd	658	65	2,159	213	115	SH727458	Sim,Hew,N
135	172	Pen Twyn Mawr	Waun Fach	32A	Black Mountains	Powys	658	17	2,159	56	161	SO242267	N
136	62	Moel yr Ogof	Moel Hebog	30B	Moel Hebog	Gwynedd	655	118	2,149	387	115	SH556478	Hu,Sim,Hew,N
137	142	Allt Lwyd	Waun Rydd	32A	Brecon Beacons	Powys	653	28	2,143	91	160	SO078189	N,sSim
138	110	Mynydd Tal-y-mignedd	Trum y Ddysgl	30B	Moel Hebog	Gwynedd	653	51	2,142	167	115	SH535513	Sim,Hew,N
140	117	Black Mixen	Great Rhos	31B	Central Wales - Radnor Forest	Powys	650	45	2,133	148	148	SO196643	Sim,Hew,N
139	187	Waun Garnedd-y-Filiast	Carnedd y Filiast	30D	The Arenigs	Conwy/ Gwynedd	650	15	2,133	49	116	SH874452	N
141	78	Moel-yr-hydd	Moelwyn Mawr	30B	The Moelwyns	Gwynedd	648	82	2,126	269	115	SH672454	Sim,Hew,N
142	106	Foel Cwm-Sian Llwyd	Cyrniau Nod	30E	The Berwyns	Gwynedd	648	57	2,126	187	125	SH995313	Sim,Hew,N
143	107	Pen y Boncyn Trefeilw	Cyrniau Nod	30E	The Berwyns	Gwynedd	646	57	2,119	187	125	SH962283	Sim,Hew,N
144	158	Pen Twyn Glas	Waun Fach	32A	Black Mountains	Powys	646	21	2,119	69	161	SO213257	N,sSim
145	32	Drygarn Fawr		31C	Central Wales - Elan Valley	Powys	645	257	2,116	843	147	SN862584	Ma,Sim,Hew,N
146	156	Diffwys West Top	Y Llethr	30D	The Rhinogs	Gwynedd	643	22	2,110	71	124	SH648229	N,sSim
148	148	Carnedd Llechwedd-llyfn	Carnedd y Filiast	30D	The Arenigs	Gwynedd	643	25	2,110	82	124 125	SH857444	N,sSim
147	188	Gyrn Wigau	Carnedd Llewelyn	30B	The Carneddau	Gwynedd	643	15	2,110	49	115	SH654675	N
149	98	Moel Lefn	Moel Hebog	30B	Moel Hebog	Gwynedd	638	62	2,093	203	115	SH552485	Sim,Hew,N
150	189	Black Mountain South Top	Black Mountain	32A	Black Mountains	Herefordshire/ Powys	637	15	2,090	49	161	SO267322	N
151	74	Garreg Las	Fan Brycheiniog	32A	Brecon Beacons	Carmarthenshire	635	92	2,083	302	160	SN777203	Sim,Hew,N,sHu
153	40	Tarrenhendre		30F	Cadair Idris	Gwynedd	634	203	2,080	666	135	SH682041	Ma,Sim,Hew,N
152	129	Creigiau Gleision North Top	Creigiau Gleision	30B	The Carneddau	Conwy	634	36	2,080	118	115	SH733622	Sim,Hew,N
154	159	Y Garn	Trum y Ddysgl	30B	Moel Hebog	Gwynedd	633	21	2,077	69	115	SH551526	N,sSim
156	71	Fan Llia	Fan Fawr	32A	Brecon Beacons	Powys	632	99	2,073	325	160	SN938186	Sim,Hew,N,sHu
155	173	Gwaun Lydan	Aran Fawddwy	30E	The Arans	Gwynedd	632	17	2,073	56	124 125	SH880211	N
157	101	Pen yr Allt Uchaf	Aran Fawddwy	30E	The Arans	Gwynedd	630	60	2,067	197	124 125	SH870196	Sim,Hew,N
158	66	Moel Fferna	Cadair Berwyn	30E	The Berwyns	Denbighshire	630	105	2,067	344	125	SJ116397	Hu,Sim,Hew,N
159	149	Stac Rhos	Cyrniau Nod	30E	The Berwyns	Gwynedd	630	25	2,067	82	125	SH969279	N,sSim
161	23	Y Garn		30D	The Rhinogs	Gwynedd	629	315	2,064	1,033	124	SH702230	Ma,Sim,Hew,N
162	85	Fan Frynych	Fan Fawr	32A	Brecon Beacons	Powys	629	74	2,064	243	160	SN957227	Sim,Hew,N
163	114	Craig Cerrig-gleisiad	Fan Fawr	32A	Brecon Beacons	Powys	629	46	2,064	151	160	SN960218	Sim,Hew,N
160	135	Foel Gron	Moel Eilio	30B	Snowdon	Gwynedd	629	31	2,064	101	115	SH560568	Sim,Hew,N
164	57	Moel Penamnen	Manod Mawr	30D	The Moelwyns	Gwynedd	628	138	2,061	453	115	SH716483	Hu,Sim,Hew,N
165	65	Foel y Geifr	Esgeiriau Gwynion	30E	The Berwyns	Gwynedd	626	110	2,054	361	125	SH937275	Hu,Sim,Hew,N
166	79	Moel y Cerrig Duon	Esgeiriau Gwynion	30E	The Arans	Gwynedd/ Powys	625	80	2,051	262	125	SH923241	Sim,Hew,N
167	138	Pen y Castell	Carnedd Llewelyn	30B	The Carneddau	Conwy	624	29	2,046	95	115	SH721688	N,sSim
169	45	Moel Ysgyfarnogod		30D	The Rhinogs	Gwynedd	623	180	2,044	591	124	SH658345	Ma,Sim,Hew,N
168	163	Craiglwyn	Creigiau Gleision	30B	The Carneddau	Conwy	623	20	2,044	66	115	SH730608	N,sSim
170	58	Craig-y-llyn	Cadair Idris	30F	Cadair Idris	Gwynedd	622	136	2,041	446	124	SH665119	Hu,Sim,Hew,N
171	181	Waun Camddwr	Aran Fawddwy	30E	The Arans	Gwynedd	622	16	2,040	51	124 125	SH847205	N
172	130	Moel yr Henfaes	Cadair Berwyn	30E	The Berwyns	Denbighshire	621	35	2,037	115	125	SJ089369	Sim,Hew,N
173	63	Gallt y Daren	Moel Llyfnant	30D	The Arenigs	Gwynedd	619	113	2,032	371	124	SH778344	Hu,Sim,Hew,N
176	46	Cefn yr Ystrad		32A	Brecon Beacons	Powys	619	180	2,031	591	160	SO087136	Ma,Sim,Hew,N
174	153	Gallt y Wenallt	Y Lliwedd	30B	Snowdon	Gwynedd	619	24	2,031	79	115	SH642532	N,sSim
175	154	Y Gyrn	Pen y Fan	32A	Brecon Beacons	Powys	619	24	2,031	79	160	SN988216	N,sSim
177	68	Garreg Lwyd	Fan Brycheiniog	32A	Brecon Beacons	Carmarthenshire	616	104	2,021	341	160	SN740179	Hu,Sim,Hew,N
178	174	Foel Boeth	Moel Llyfnant	30D	The Arenigs	Gwynedd	615	17	2,019	55	124	SH779342	N
179	143	Cefn Gwyntog	Cyrniau Nod	30E	The Berwyns	Powys	615	27	2,018	89	125	SH976265	N,sSim
181	134	Llechwedd Du	Esgeiriau Gwynion	30E	The Arans	Gwynedd	614	32	2,014	105	124 125	SH893223	Sim,Hew,N
180	144	Foel Penolau	Moel Ysgyfarnogod	30D	The Rhinogs	Gwynedd	614	26	2,014	85	124	SH661348	N,sSim
182	75	Gorllwyn	Drygarn Fawr	31C	Central Wales - Elan Valley	Powys	613	88	2,011	289	147	SN917590	Sim,Hew,N
183	115	Foel Goch	Esgeiriau Gwynion	30E	The Berwyns	Gwynedd	613	46	2,010	151	125	SH943290	Sim,Hew,N
184	145	Trum y Gwragedd	Esgeiriau Gwynion	30E	The Berwyns	Gwynedd	611	26	2,005	85	125	SH941284	N,sSim
185	28	Foel Goch		30D	The Arenigs	Conwy/ Gwynedd	611	274	2,005	899	125	SH953422	Ma,Sim,Hew,N
186	41	Pen y Garn		31C	Central Wales - Pumlumon	Cardiganshire	611	194	2,005	636	135 147	SN798771	Ma,Sim,Hew,N
187	43	Tal y Fan		30B	The Carneddau	Conwy	610	190	2,001	622	115	SH729726	Ma,Sim,Hew,N
188	123	Bache Hill	Great Rhos	31B	Central Wales - Radnor Forest	Powys	610	41	2,001	135	137 148	SO213636	Sim,Hew,N
189	91	Mynydd Graig Goch	Craig Cwm Silyn	30B	Moel Hebog	Gwynedd	610	71	2,000	233	115 123	SH497485	Sim,Hew,N

== Bibliography ==
- Nuttall, John & Anne (2009). The Mountains of England & Wales – Volume 1: Wales (3rd ed.). Milnthorpe, Cumbria: Cicerone. ISBN 978-1852845940.
- Nuttall, John & Anne (2008). The Mountains of England & Wales – Volume 2: England (3rd ed.). Milnthorpe, Cumbria: Cicerone. ISBN 978-1852845896.
- Nuttall, John & Anne (1990). The Mountains of England & Wales - Volume 1: Wales (1st ed.). Milnthorpe, Cumbria: Cicerone. ISBN 978-1852845940.
- Nuttall, John & Anne (1990). The Mountains of England & Wales - Volume 2: England (1st ed.). Milnthorpe, Cumbria: Cicerone. ISBN 978-1852845896.

== DoBIH codes ==
The DoBIH uses the following codes for the various classifications of mountains and hills in the British Isles, which many of the above peaks also fall into:

- Ma Marilyn
- Hu HuMP
- Sim Simm
- 5 Dodd
- M Munro
- MT Munro Top
- F Furth
- C Corbett
- G Graham
- D Donald
- DT Donald Top
- Hew Hewitt
- N Nuttall
- Dew Dewey
- DDew Donald Dewey
- HF Highland Five
- 4 400-499m Tump
- 3 300-399m Tump (GB)
- 2 200-299m Tump (GB)
- 1 100-199m Tump (GB)
- 0 0-99m Tump (GB)
- W Wainwright
- WO Wainwright Outlying Fell
- B Birkett
- Sy Synge
- Fel Fellranger
- CoH County Top – Historic (pre-1974)
- CoA County Top – Administrative (1974 to mid-1990s)
- CoU County Top – Current County or Unitary Authority
- CoL County Top – Current London Borough
- SIB Significant Island of Britain
- Dil Dillon
- A Arderin
- VL Vandeleur-Lynam
- MDew Myrddyn Dewey
- O Other list (which includes):
  - Bin Binnion
  - Bg Bridge
  - BL Buxton & Lewis
  - Ca Carn
  - CT Corbett Top
  - GT Graham Top
  - Mur Murdo
  - P500 P500
  - P600 P600
- Un unclassified
prefixes:
- s sub
- x deleted

suffixes:
= twin

== English Nuttalls by civil parish ==
*on the boundary between two or three (**) parishes

Parish	Nuttalls
Underskiddaw	Carl Side, Great Calva*, Long Side*, Lonscale Fell, Sale How, Skiddaw*, Skiddaw Little Man
Bassenthwaite	Long Side*, Skiddaw*
Threlkeld	Atkinson Pike*, Blencathra, Gategill Fell Top,
Mungrisdale	Atkinson Pike*, Bannerdale Crags, Bowscale Fell, Carrock Fell*, Great Lingy Hill*, Hare Stones*, Miller Moss*
Ireby and Uldale	Great Calva*
Caldbeck	Carrock Fell*, Great Lingy Hill*, Hare Stones*, High Pike, Knott, Miller Moss*
Buttermere	Brandreth**, Crag Hill*, Dale Head*, Fleetwith Pike, Grasmoor, Grey Knotts*, High Crag*, High Stile, Honister Crag, Hopegill Head*, Ladyside Pike*, Red Pike**, Sail*, Sand Hill*, Wandope, Whiteless Pike, Whiteside, Whiteside E Top
Lorton	Grisedale Pike*, Hobcarton Crag*, Hopegill Head*, Ladyside Pike*
Above Derwent	Causey Pike, Crag Hill*, Dale Head*, Grisedale Pike*, Hindscarth, High Spy, High Spy N Top, Hobcarton Crag*, Robinson, Sail*, Sand Hill*, Scar Crags
Loweswater	Dodd, Great Borne*, Red Pike**, Starling Dodd*
Ennerdale and Kinniside	Black Crag*, Brandreth**, Caw Fell, Great Borne*, Great Gable**, Green Gable*, Haycock*, High Crag*, Iron Crag, Kirk Fell*, Kirk Fell E Top*, Little Gowder Crag*, Looking Stead*, Pillar*, Pillar Rock, Red Pike**, Scoat Fell*, Starling Dodd*, Steeple
Borrowdale	Allen Crags, Base Brown, Brandreth**, Combe Door Top, Combe Head, Dovenest Top, Esk Pike*, Glaramara, Great End*, Great Gable**, Green Gable*, Grey Knotts*, High House Tarn Top, High Raise, Looking Steads, Low Saddle, Red Beck Top, Rossett Pike*, Rosthwaite Cam, Seathwaite Fell, Seathwaite Fell S Top, Thunacar Knott*, Ullscarf*
Wasdale	Black Crag*, Broad Crag, Great Gable**, Haycock*, Kirk Fell*, Kirk Fell E Top*, Lingmell, Little Gowder Crag*, Looking Stead*, Middleboot Knotts, Pillar*, Red Pike, Round How, Sca Fell*, Scafell Pike*, Scoat Fell*, Seatallan, Symonds Knott, Yewbarrow, Yewbarrow N Top
St John's, Castlerigg and Wythburn	Codale Head*, Ullscarf*
Lakes	Bowfell*, Bowfell N Top*, Codale Head*, Cold Pike*, Crinkle Crags*, Crinkle Crags S Top**, Great Knott, Harrison Stickle, Loft Crag, Pavey Ark, Pike of Blisco, Pike of Stickle, Rossett Pike*, Shelter Crags*, Shelter Crags N Top*, Thunacar Knott*
Eskdale	Bowfell*, Bowfell N Top*, Crinkle Crags*, Crinkle Crags S Top**, Esk Pike*, Great End*, Ill Crag, Sca Fell*, Scafell Pike*, Shelter Crags*, Shelter Crags N Top*
Ulpha	Cold Pike*, Cold Pike W Top, Cold Pike Far W Top, Crinkle Crags S Top**, Harter Fell, Little Stand
Dunnerdale with Seathwaite	Brim Fell*, Dow Crag*, Great Carrs*, Grey Friar, Swirl How*, Walna Scar*
Coniston	Black Sails, Brim Fell*, Great Carrs*, Swirl How*, The Old Man of Coniston, Wetherlam, White Maiden**
Torver	Dow Crag*, Walna Scar*, White Maiden**
Broughton West	White Maiden**

== See also ==
- List of mountains of the British Isles by height
- Lists of mountains and hills in the British Isles
- Lists of mountains in Ireland
- List of Munro mountains in Scotland
- List of Murdos (mountains)
- List of Furth mountains in the British Isles
- List of Marilyns in the British Isles
- List of P600 mountains in the British Isles
