= Murton Fell =

Hill in Cumbria, England

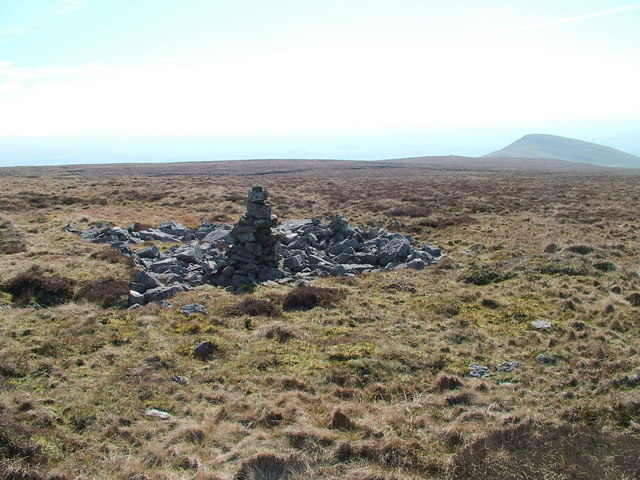
- Stones near the summit

Highest point
- Elevation: 675 m (2,215 ft)
- Prominence: 74 m (243 ft)
- Parent peak: Mickle Fell
- Listing: Simm, Hewitt, Nuttall
- Coordinates: 54°36′57″N 2°22′59″W

Geography
- Location within the former Eden District Location within Cumbria
- Location: North Pennines, England
- Parent range: Lon:
- OS grid: NY753245
- Topo map: OS Outdoor Leisure 19

Murton Fell is a hill of 675 metres (2,215 ft) above the village of Murton, Cumbria in Westmorland and Furness district, in the North Pennines. It lies east of the dramatic valley of High Cup Nick

It lies on the central watershed of England, as it is drained to the south west into the River Eden flowing into the Solway Firth, and to the north east into the River Tees and ultimately the North Sea.
