= Black Fell (Pennines) =

Hill in the North Pennines, England

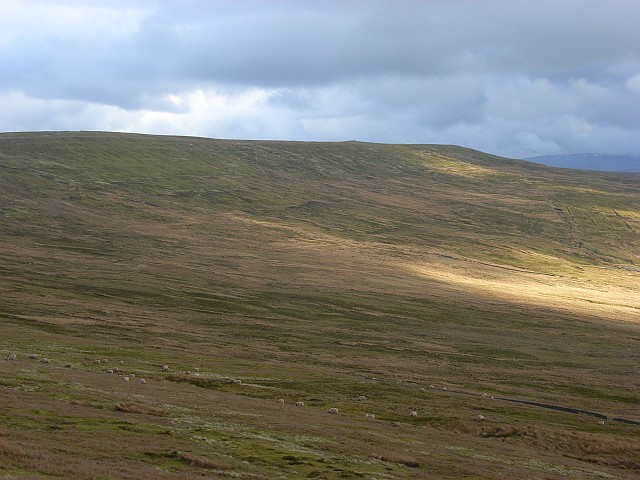
- The flank of Black Fell

Highest point
- Elevation: 664 m (2,178 ft)
- Prominence: 89 m (292 ft)
- Parent peak: Cross Fell
- Listing: Hewitt, Nuttall
- Coordinates: 54°47′36″N 2°32′56″W

Geography
- Location within Cumbria
- Location: Cumbria, England
- Parent range: North Pennines
- OS grid: NY648444
- Topo map: OS Landranger 86

Black Fell is a hill in the North Pennines, England. It is located just north of the A686 road, west of Alston and is one of the most northerly parts of the Pennines.

It has a height of 664 m (2,178 ft) and a prominence of 87 m (285 ft), and is classed as a Simm, Hewitt, Nuttall, Buxton & Lewis, Bridge, and Clem.

It is on the Pennine watershed: streams on its eastern slopes drain into the River South Tyne and towards the North Sea, while streams on the western slopes drain into the River Eden which flows into the Solway Firth.

The book Mountain Days in the Pennines recommends a "strenuous" circular walk of 18 km (11 mi) over Thack Moor and Black Fell, starting from Renwick, and describes the area as "the soft grassy fells that gather north of the A 686 ... only rarely visited by walkers".
