= Great Dun Fell =

Mountain in the United Kingdom

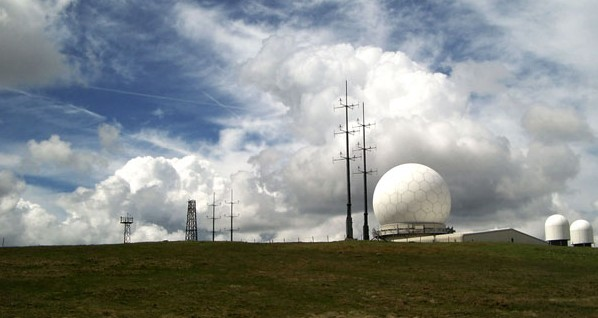
- The radar station on the summit

Highest point
- Parent peak: Cross Fell
- Listing: Hewitt, Nuttall
- Coordinates: 54.6831°N 2.4513°W

Geography
- Location within England
- Country: United Kingdom
- County: Cumbria
- Parent range: North Pennines
- OS grid: NY710321
- Topo map: OS Landranger 91

At a height of 848 metres (2,782 ft), Great Dun Fell is the second-highest mountain in England's Pennines, lying two miles (three kilometres) south along the watershed from Cross Fell, its higher neighbour. Together with its smaller twin, Little Dun Fell, which reaches 842 m (2,762 ft), it forms a stepping-stone for the Pennine Way on its long climb up from Dufton. It lies within the historic county boundaries of Westmorland, the ceremonial county of Cumbria, and the modern unitary authority area of Westmorland and Furness.

== Radar station ==
At the summit there is a radar station which is operated by National Air Traffic Services and is a key part of the Air Traffic Control system for Northern England and Southern Scotland. A radome containing Primary Surveillance radar (PSR) and Secondary Surveillance Radar (SSR) antennas, various towers and fencing crown the summit. Alfred Wainwright abhorred the old radio station (removed in the 1980s) in his book Pennine Way Companion.

The construction of the radar station led to the repaving of a tarred road to the summit, which became Britain's highest road. This road is marked as private from just above the village of Knock, and is not open to public motor vehicles. However, it is a bridleway until shortly before the radar station, so it is open to walkers, cyclists and horseriders.

In 2025 work commenced on the replacement of the radome.

=== Field station ===
The University of Manchester formerly had a permanent meteorological observatory at the Great Dun Fell site. It has hosted a number of field experiments doing research into clouds and their interactions with pollution. As the summit is in cloud for two thirds of the year it is an ideal location for this type of research. The university still has the option to use the site for short-term measurement periods.

== Mining ==
There are the remains of hushing gulleys on the slopes of the mountain, created during lead mining of the Industrial Revolution. Most notable is the clearly visible hushing on the eastern flank of the fell.

On the west flank of the fell, immediately below the radar station, was Silverband Mine where galena was mined by the London Lead Company. Production changed to barytes in the early 20th century and in 1939, following the takeover of the mine by the Laporte Chemical Company, production was significantly increased. An aerial ropeway, which is now listed as a scheduled monument, was constructed to transport the ore down the fell for processing at Milburn Grange. The mine closed in 1966 but reopened in the 1980s and was worked sporadically. The mine is now fully closed although certain buildings remain following a significant land remediation project.

== Cycling ==
Great Dun Fell is considered one of England’s greatest cycling climbs and is arguably the toughest hill climb on the calendar. The climb is 7.25km long with 630 meters of elevation gain at an average of 9% and pitches of up to 25%. It is a private service road closed to general motor vehicle traffic, but walkers and cyclists are legally permitted to use it as a public bridleway. Andrew Feather holds the men's hill climbing record set in 2019 and Illi Gardner holds the women's record set in 2024.

== Climate ==
Under the Köppen climate classification, Great Dun Fell has a subpolar oceanic climate (Cfc), closely bordering both a subarctic climate (Dfc) under the 0 °C (32 °F) isotherm and an alpine tundra climate (ET) due to a July mean of exactly 10 °C (50 °F). The Met Office station publishes only temperature, wind and frost averages. The summers are cool due to elevation. Considering its elevation and a latitude of over 54 degrees, winters are relatively mild due to oceanic influences.

The highest temperature recorded since 1963 was 29.7 °C (85.5 °F) on 10 August 2003 and the lowest was −13.5 °C (7.7 °F) on 8 February 1969.

Climate data for Great Dun Fell 847 m (2,779 ft), 1991-2020 averages, 1963–present records. (Note: Mean monthly absolute maximum and minimum temperatures are for the period 2000–2025.)
Month	Jan	Feb	Mar	Apr	May	Jun	Jul	Aug	Sep	Oct	Nov	Dec	Year
Record high °C (°F)	15.3 (59.5)	13.3 (55.9)	14.7 (58.5)	22.9 (73.2)	25.6 (78.1)	25.5 (77.9)	27.5 (81.5)	29.7 (85.5)	21.2 (70.2)	20.4 (68.7)	17.2 (63.0)	14.3 (57.7)	29.7 (85.5)
Mean maximum °C (°F)	7.5 (45.5)	7.9 (46.2)	9.8 (49.6)	12.9 (55.2)	15.6 (60.1)	18.1 (64.6)	20.2 (68.4)	17.8 (64.0)	15.8 (60.4)	12.8 (55.0)	10.3 (50.5)	8.2 (46.8)	22.0 (71.6)
Mean daily maximum °C (°F)	1.6 (34.9)	1.6 (34.9)	2.8 (37.0)	5.4 (41.7)	8.6 (47.5)	11.0 (51.8)	12.5 (54.5)	12.3 (54.1)	10.1 (50.2)	6.8 (44.2)	4.0 (39.2)	2.1 (35.8)	6.6 (43.8)
Daily mean °C (°F)	−0.4 (31.3)	−0.4 (31.3)	0.7 (33.3)	2.7 (36.9)	5.7 (42.3)	8.3 (46.9)	10.0 (50.0)	9.9 (49.8)	7.9 (46.2)	4.8 (40.6)	2.1 (35.8)	0.1 (32.2)	4.3 (39.7)
Mean daily minimum °C (°F)	−2.4 (27.7)	−2.5 (27.5)	−1.5 (29.3)	0.0 (32.0)	2.7 (36.9)	5.5 (41.9)	7.5 (45.5)	7.4 (45.3)	5.6 (42.1)	2.8 (37.0)	0.2 (32.4)	−2.0 (28.4)	1.9 (35.5)
Mean minimum °C (°F)	−6.6 (20.1)	−6.9 (19.6)	−5.8 (21.6)	−3.8 (25.2)	−1.6 (29.1)	1.9 (35.4)	4.1 (39.4)	3.9 (39.0)	1.5 (34.7)	−1.1 (30.0)	−4.5 (23.9)	−5.9 (21.4)	−8.1 (17.4)
Record low °C (°F)	−12.5 (9.5)	−13.5 (7.7)	−11.8 (10.8)	−11.4 (11.5)	−6.7 (19.9)	−3.8 (25.2)	0.0 (32.0)	0.0 (32.0)	−2.2 (28.0)	−9.0 (15.8)	−9.9 (14.2)	−13.4 (7.9)	−13.5 (7.7)
Source 1: Met Office
Source 2: Meteomanz
