= Cold Fell (Pennines) =

Mountain in Cumbria, England

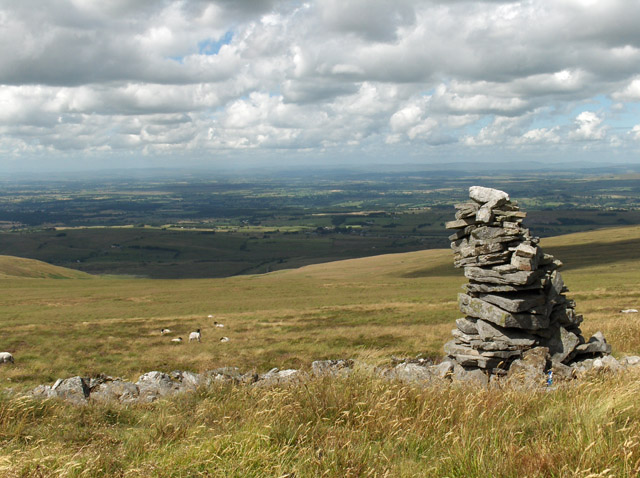
- Summit of Cold Fell

Highest point
- Elevation: 621 m (2,037 ft)
- Prominence: 168 m (551 ft)
- Parent peak: Cross Fell
- Listing: Marilyn
- Coordinates: 54.8939°N 2.6163°W

Geography
- Location: Pennines, England
- OS grid: NY605556

Cold Fell is a mountain in the northern Pennines, in Cumbria, England. Lying among the northernmost uplands of the North Pennines AONB, it is the most northerly mountain in Cumbria and is listed as a Marilyn due to its prominence of 168m.
