= Cross Fell =

Mountain in Cumbria, England

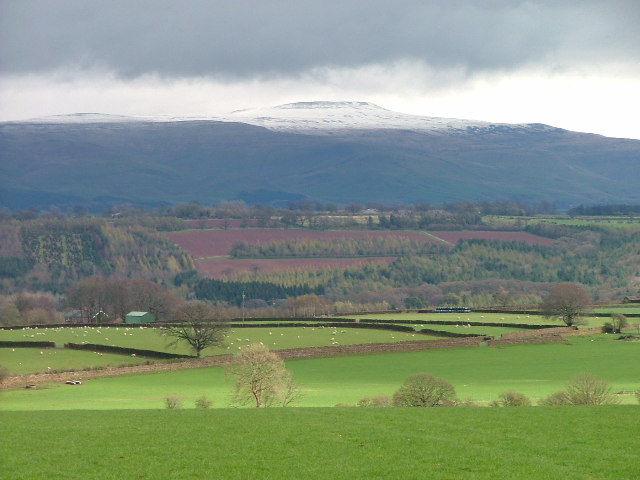
- Cross Fell seen from the Eden Valley

Highest point
- Elevation: 893 m (2,930 ft)
- Prominence: 651 m (2,136 ft)
- Parent peak: Helvellyn
- Listing: Hewitt, Marilyn, Nuttall, Hardy
- Coordinates: 54°42′10″N 2°29′14″W

Geography
- Location within the former Eden District Location within Cumbria
- Location: North Pennines, England
- OS grid: NY687343
- Topo map: OS Landranger 91

Cross Fell is the highest mountain in the Pennines of Northern England and the highest point in England outside the Lake District. It is located in the North Pennines Area of Outstanding Natural Beauty. It lies within the county of Cumbria and the historic county boundaries of Cumberland.

The summit, at 893 metres (2,930 ft), is a stony plateau, part of a 7 3/4-mile-long (12.5-kilometre) ridge running north-west to south-east, which also incorporates Little Dun Fell at 842 metres (2,762 ft) and Great Dun Fell at 848 metres (2,782 ft). The three adjoining fells form an escarpment that rises steeply above the Eden Valley on its south-western side and drops off more gently on its north-eastern side towards the South Tyne and Tees Valleys.

Cross Fell summit is crowned by a cross-shaped dry-stone shelter. On a clear day there are excellent views from the summit across the Eden Valley to the mountains of the Lake District. On the northern side of Cross Fell there are also fine views across the Solway Firth to the Southern Uplands of Scotland.

The fell is prone to dense hill fog and fierce winds. A shrieking noise induced by the Helm Wind is a characteristic of the locality. (Note: The Helm Wind can be very strong where it is channelled down gullies in the side of the escarpment. It is experienced particularly in the villages of Milburn and Kirkland.) It can be an inhospitable place for much of the year. In ancient times it was known as "Fiends Fell" and believed to be the haunt of evil spirits. St Augustine of Canterbury is said to have blessed the hill when he arrived here on his travels so it became known as Cross Fell in the Christian tradition, although it has been speculated that the fell became known as Cross Fell ("cross" meaning "angry") because of the evil spirits.

Greg's Hut is a mountain bothy approximately 3/4 mile (1.2 kilometres) north of the summit. This bothy is looked after by the Mountain Bothies Association. Greg's Hut is the highest mountain bothy in England, sitting on the 700-metre (2,300 ft) contour line. From 2010 to 2023 the Mountain Bothies Association refurbished the bothy, including fitting new windows, flooring, and a new stove.

== Local geography ==
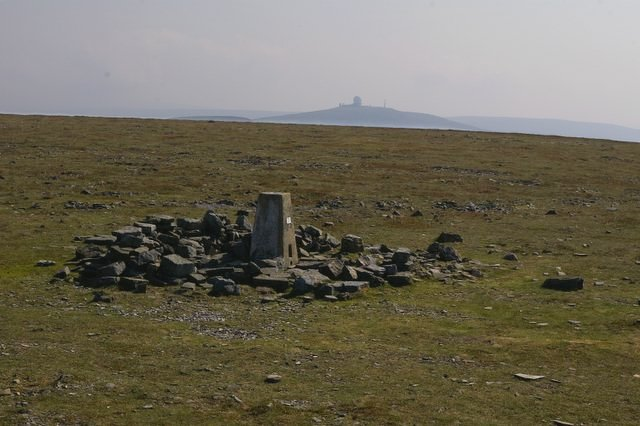
The summit of Cross Fell with Great Dun Fell and its radar station in the background. The object in the centre foreground is a triangulation point

The upper parts of Cross Fell and the adjoining fells are formed mainly from beds of mudstone, sandstone and siltstone of the Yoredale Group whilst lower ground is formed by multiple layers of the Carboniferous Limestone. Where erosion-resistant beds surface, there are steep rock faces. There are also strata of shale and gritstone that surface on the fell. On the south and west facing slopes of Cross Fell the rock faces have been broken up by frost action to give a scree slope made up of large boulders. The local terrain shows obvious evidence of recent glaciation and is covered by thin soil and acidic peat.

Cross Fell, Great Dun Fell and Little Dun Fell form a block of high terrain which is all over 800 metres (2,625 ft) in elevation. This is the largest block of high ground in England and tends to retain snow-cover longer than neighbouring areas. Snow can be found in gullies on the north side of Cross Fell as late as May in most years. In some years, lying snow has been known to persist until July and fresh snowfall in June (mid-summer in the Northern Hemisphere) is common.

Precipitation on Cross Fell averages around 2,800 millimetres (110 in) per year. Local flora includes a number of rare alpine plants such as the Starry Saxifrage and a mountain Forget-me-not. Cross Fell is covered by what is known as "siliceous alpine and boreal grassland". It is the southernmost outlier of this vegetation type, which is common to highlands in Scotland and Scandinavia. It is a designated Special Area of Conservation (SAC). Local farmers are required to keep free-roaming sheep off the tops of the fells in order to avoid damaging the natural flora.

Cross Fell is a conspicuous feature in the landscape. It dominates the skyline on almost the entire 20-mile (32-kilometre) length of the A66 trunk road between Penrith and Stainmore. It can also be seen from many points in the Lake District, including the Helvellyn summit, and from high ground throughout Dumfriesshire and Northumberland. Most remarkably, it is claimed that it is visible in exceptional circumstances from the summit of Carnedd Llewelyn in Snowdonia (Wales) at a distance of 123 miles (198 kilometres).
