= Craig Cwm Silyn =

Mountain in Gwynedd, Wales

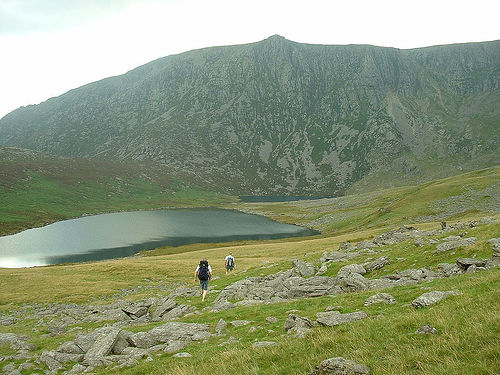
- Craig Cwm Silyn, seen from Cwm Silyn corrie.

Highest point
- Elevation: 734 m (2,408 ft)
- Prominence: 398 m (1,306 ft)
- Parent peak: Moel Hebog
- Listing: Marilyn, Hewitt, Nuttall
- Coordinates: 53.02202°N 4.22140°W

Naming
- English translation: Crag Of Cwm Silyn
- Language of name: Welsh

Geography
- Location: Snowdonia, Wales
- OS grid: SH525502
- Topo map: OS Landranger 115

Craig Cwm Silyn is a mountain in Snowdonia, North Wales which forms the highest point on the celebrated Nantlle Ridge.

The steep northern face is popular with climbers. To the west the Nantlle Ridge continues over Garnedd Goch and ends at Mynydd Graig Goch. To the east the ridge dips down to 515m before rising up to Mynydd Tal-y-mignedd, Trum y Ddysgl, Mynydd Drws-y-coed and ending at Y Garn in Nantlle. The views are extensive, offering a 360-degree panorama.

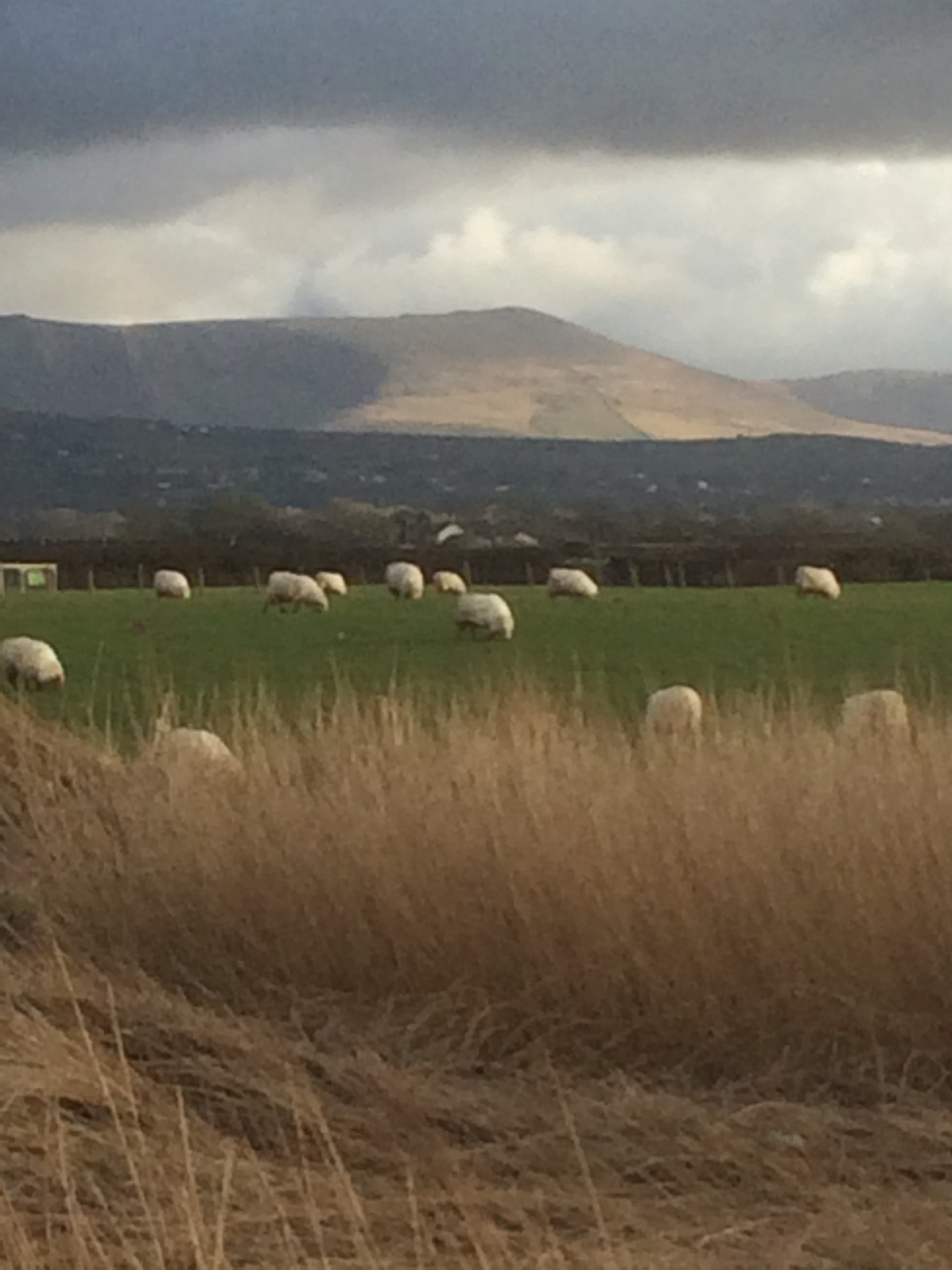
Craig Cwm Silyn from the Foryd

Listed summits of Craig Cwm Silyn
Name	Grid ref	Height	Status
Garnedd Goch		700 m (2,297 ft)	Sub-Hewitt, Nuttall
Mynydd Graig Goch		610 m (2,000 ft)	Hewitt, Nuttall
