= Mynydd Graig Goch =

Western end peak of the Nantlle Ridge in Wales

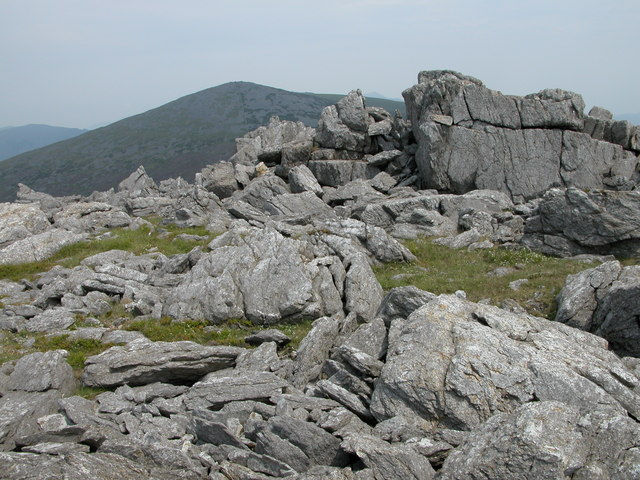
- Crags on the summit of Mynydd Graig Goch

Highest point
- Elevation: 610 m (2,000 ft)
- Prominence: 71 m (233 ft)
- Parent peak: Craig Cwm Silyn
- Listing: Hewitt, Nuttall
- Coordinates: 53.012807°N 4.241368°W

Naming
- English translation: mountain of the red rock
- Language of name: Welsh

Geography
- Location: Snowdonia, Wales
- OS grid: SH497485
- Topo map: OS Landranger 115

Mynydd Graig Goch (Welsh, 'mountain of the red rock') is the western end peak of the Nantlle Ridge, and is a subsidiary summit of Craig Cwm Silyn. It is also the most westerly 2000 ft peak in Wales. For many years it was excluded from lists of the Welsh 2000 ft mountains because of a spot height of 609 metres (1,998 ft) on OS maps. However, this changed in 2008; after years of speculation a group of hillwalkers carried out a precise GPS survey of the peak, measuring the absolute height as 609.75 metres (2,000 ft 6 in).

== Panorama and topography ==
The summit is boulder strewn, crowned by several tors of rock, of which one is the true summit. The southern and western flanks consist of large boulder fields. The north-east face has steep cliffs, that form the backwall of the glacial Cwm Dulyn. Cwm Dulyn's lake Llyn Cwm Dulyn contains a population of Arctic char. Views from the summit are extensive, overseeing Llyn and the coast. Garnedd Goch, Mynydd Mawr, Moel Hebog and Snowdon (Yr Wyddfa) are all observable.

== Folklore ==
Marc Morris, in his biography of King Edward I of England, claims that in June 1284 Llyn Cwm Dulyn was the setting for the court of the king for victory celebrations, following his defeat of Llywelyn ap Gruffudd, with an Arthurian theme, including the King's 45th birthday. "Back in Wales, the search for symbols of conquest and the celebration of victory continued in a similarly Arthurian vein, For most of June, including his forty-fifth birthday, the king chose to keep his court at Llyn Cwm Dulyn, a deep, dark lake in the mountains to the south of Caernarfon, reputed to have mystical properties." Documentary evidence of Edward I's presence at Llyn Cwm Dulyn (i.e. near Llanllyfni) exists in the form of a 15 June 1284 letter from Edward to John I, Duke of Brabant, in what proved to be an abortive effort to mediate between John and the Duke of Guelders over the Duchy of Limberg; the dispute eventually led to the Battle of Worringen, said to be the bloodiest of the Middle Ages, four years later (see: UK National Archives, ref: SC 1/12/57).
