= Y Garn (Nantlle Ridge) =

Hill in Wales

Coordinates: 53°03′05″N 04°09′45″W

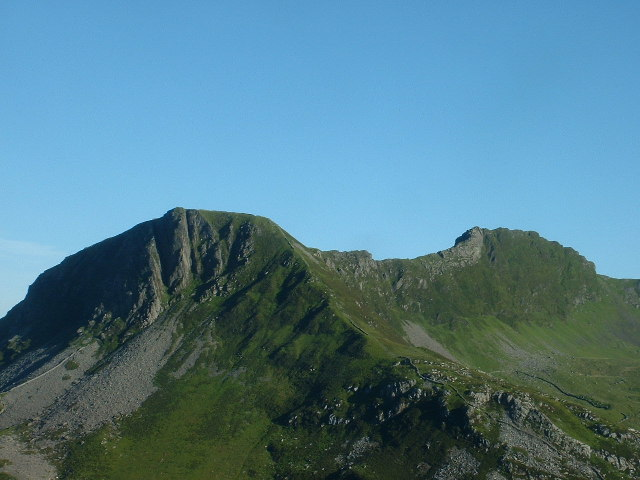
- Y Garn (left) and Mynydd Drws-y-Coed (right) from Mynydd Mawr

Highest point
- Elevation: 633 m (2,077 ft)
- Prominence: 21 m (69 ft)
- Listing: sub Hewitt, Nuttall

Naming
- Language of name: Welsh

Geography
- Location: Gwynedd, Wales
- Parent range: Moel Hebog
- Topo map: OS Landranger 115, OS Outdoor Leisure 17

Climbing
- Easiest route: Walk

Y Garn is a top of Mynydd Drws-y-Coed in Snowdonia, north Wales and is the easterly end of the Nantlle Ridge.

It has steep north-facing cliffs, the summit area being the highest point on a broad rocky plateau. The summit plateau contains two large shelter cairns.
