= Yr Aran =

Mountain in Gwynedd, Wales

Coordinates: 53.04249°N 4.08372°W

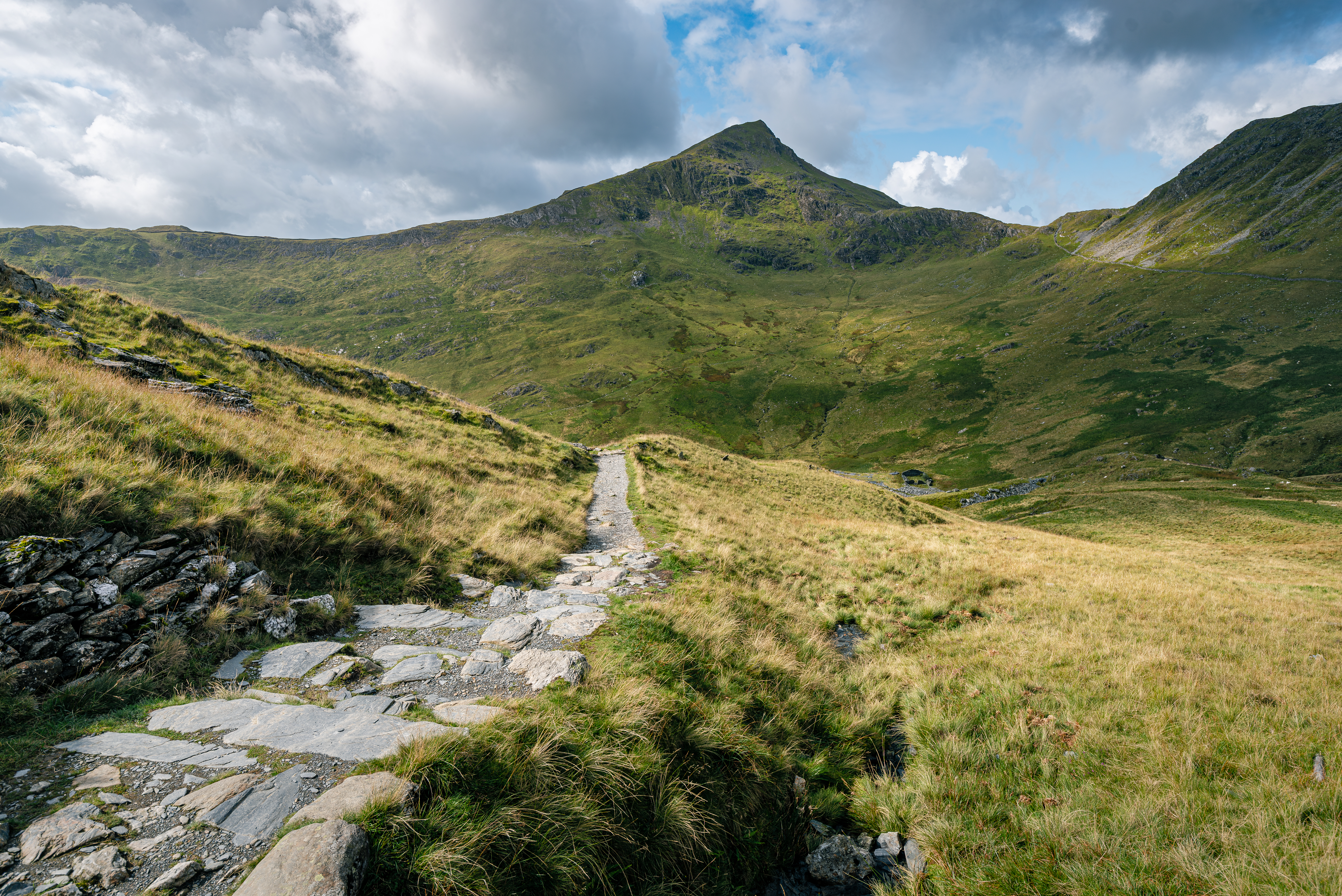
- Yr Aran from the Watkin path

Highest point
- Elevation: 747.2 m (2,451 ft)
- Prominence: 235 m (771 ft)
- Parent peak: Snowdon
- Listing: Marilyn, Hewitt, Nuttall

Naming
- English translation: the peak
- Language of name: Welsh
- Pronunciation: Welsh: [ər ˈaran]

Geography
- Location: Gwynedd, Wales
- Parent range: Snowdonia
- OS grid: SH604515
- Topo map: OS Landranger 115

Yr Aran is a mountain peak on a ridge radiating south from Snowdon, Wales' highest mountain, with views of the summit of Snowdon, Moel Hebog and the Nantlle Ridge. It has an elevation of 747.2 m (2,451 ft) and a prominence of 235 m (771 ft).

Although no paths are marked on maps, the ascent can be made as a detour from the Rhyd Ddu path or the Watkin Path up Snowdon.
