= Garnedd Goch =

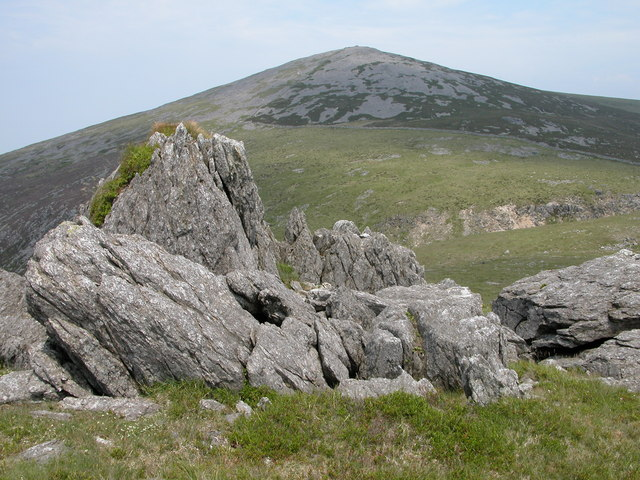
- Garnedd Goch, viewed from the south-west from crags between Garnedd Goch and Mynydd Graig Goch.

Highest point
- Elevation: 700 m (2,300 ft)
- Prominence: 25 m (82 ft)
- Parent peak: Craig Cwm Silyn
- Listing: Sub-Hewitt, Nuttall
- Coordinates: 53.02202°N 4.22140°W

Naming
- English translation: Red Cairn
- Language of name: Welsh

Geography
- Location: Snowdonia, Wales
- OS grid: SH511495
- Topo map: OS Landranger 115

Garnedd Goch is a top of Craig Cwm Silyn in Snowdonia, north Wales. It is one of the peaks that forms the Nantlle Ridge. It is the third highest point.

The summit is strewn with rock debris and has a trig point and a cairn. The panorama includes the Nebo TV mast. The summit is also one of the few places from which the three castles of Criccieth, Harlech and Caernarfon can be seen.
