= Mullaghanattin =

Mountain in Ireland

- Mullach an Aitinn
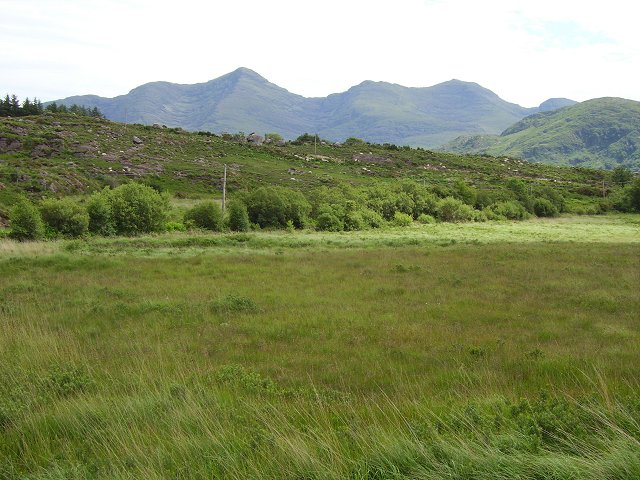
- A bog backed by Mullaghanattin

Highest point
- Elevation: 773 m (2,536 ft)
- Prominence: 528 m (1,732 ft)
- Listing: Marilyn, Hewitt
- Coordinates: 51°55′58.8″N 9°50′2.4″W

Naming
- English translation: Summit of the gorse
- Language of name: Irish

Geography
- Location within Ireland
- Location: County Kerry, Ireland
- Parent range: Dunkerron Mountains (Mountains of the Iveragh Peninsula)
- OSI/OSNI grid: V738772

Climbing
- Easiest route: scrambling

Mullaghanattin (Irish: Mullach an Aitinn, meaning 'summit of the gorse') is a summit of the Dunkerron Mountains, part of the Mountains of the Iveragh Peninsula in County Kerry, Ireland.

== Geography ==
The mountain lies southwest of Stumpa Dúloigh, the highest mountain of the Dunkerron range. With an elevation is 773 metres it is the 58th highest summit in Ireland.

== Access to the summit ==
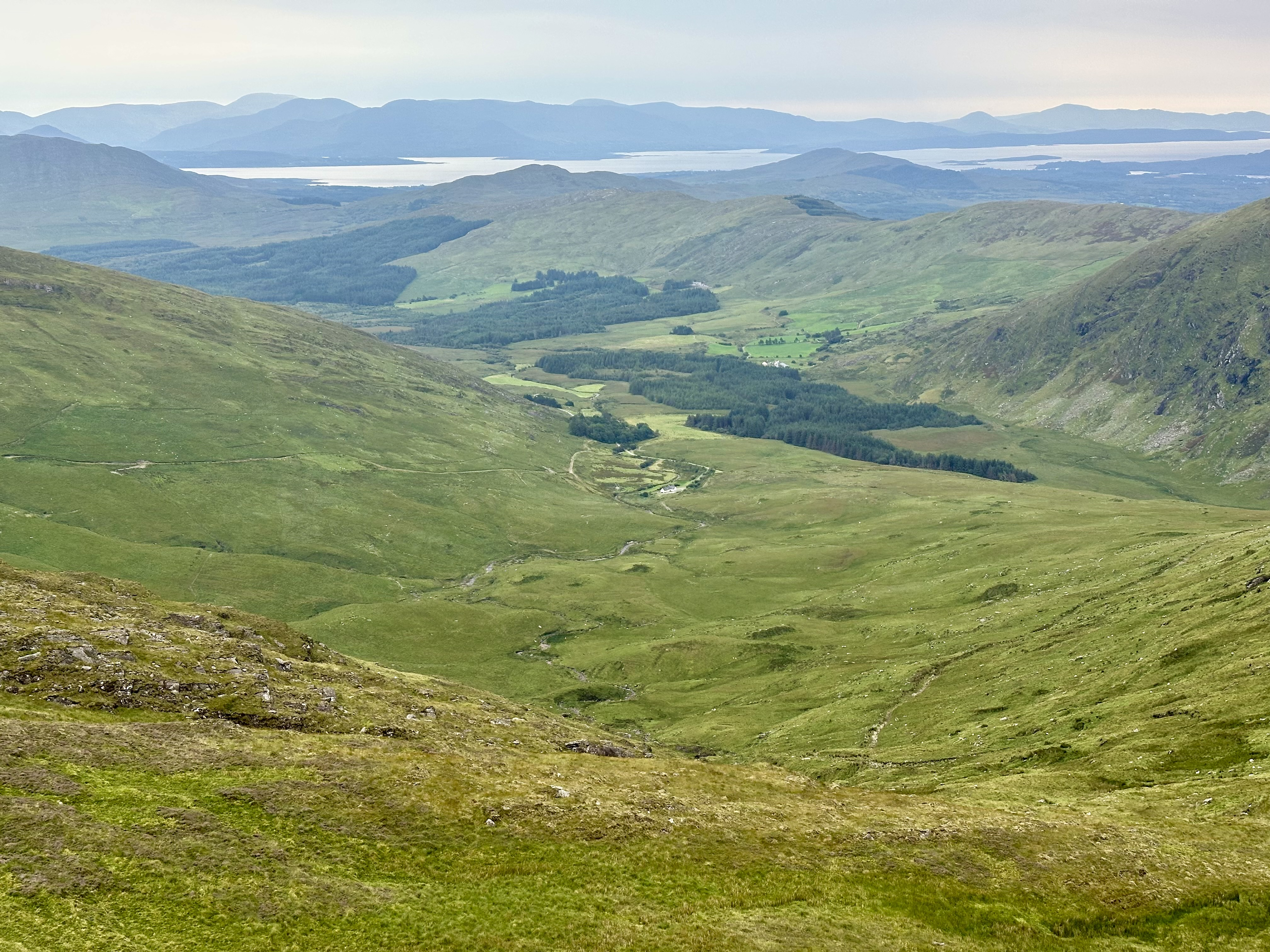
View of Tooreennahone area (colloquially "The Pocket") from the Mullaghanattin Horseshoe Trail

Mullaghanattin summit can be accessed from Tooreennahone parking, then walking through gentle slopes which become very steep only for the last km. The valley surrounded by the horseshoe-shaped Mullaghanattin and Beann range has been referred to as "Mullaghanattin Pocket" or simply "Pocket", and group walks are frequently organized over the peaks in the range.
