= Mynydd Tal-y-Mignedd =

Mountain peak in Wales

Coordinates: 53°02′22″N 04°11′09″W

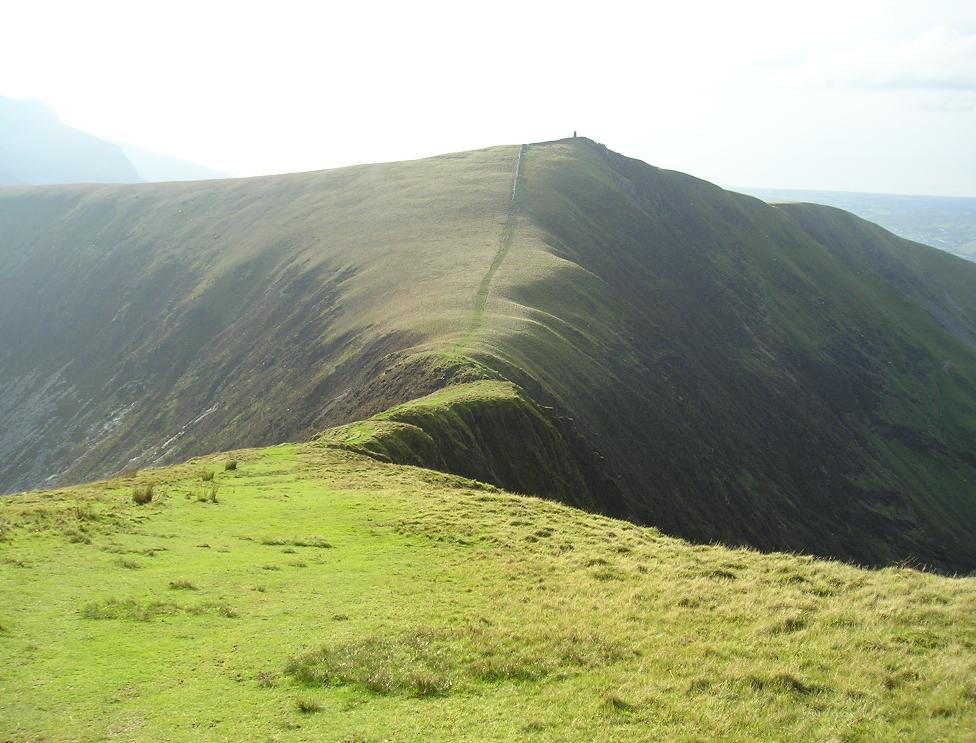
- Mynydd Tal-y-Mignedd from Trum y Ddysgl

Highest point
- Elevation: 653 m (2,142 ft)
- Prominence: 51 m (167 ft)
- Listing: Hewitt, Nuttall

Naming
- Language of name: Welsh

Geography
- Location: Gwynedd, Wales
- Parent range: Moel Hebog
- Topo map: OS Landranger 115, OS Outdoor Leisure 17

Climbing
- Easiest route: Walk

Mynydd Tal-y-Mignedd is a peak on the Nantlle Ridge in Snowdonia, north Wales. It is located at the centre of the ridge, and is a subsidiary summit of Trum y Ddysgl.

The summit is crowned by a large stone obelisk, put up to commemorate Queen Victoria's Diamond Jubilee. A fine arete links it to its parent, Trum y Ddysgl, while a col links it to the next summit eastwards along the ridge, Craig Cwm Silyn.

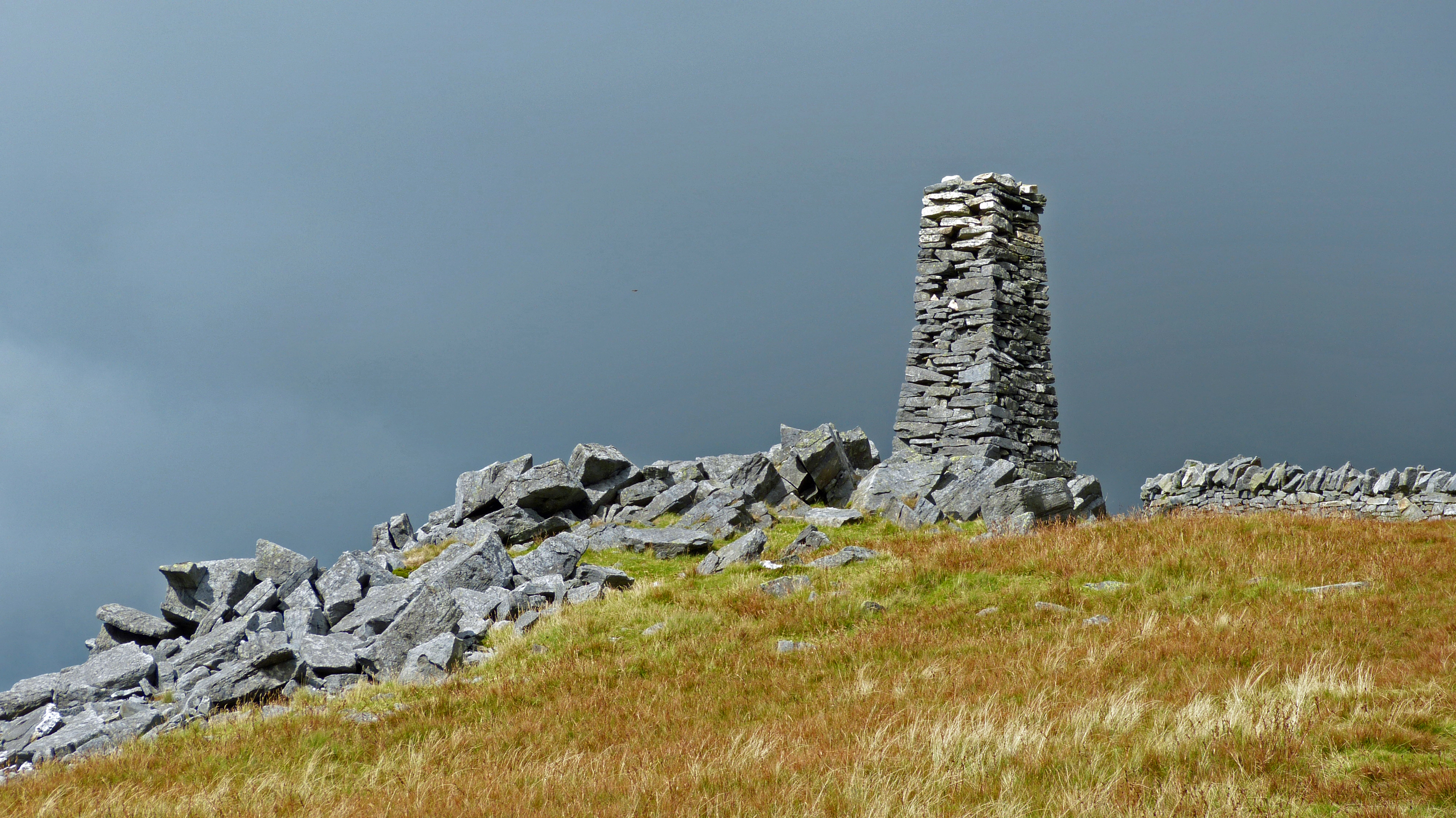
Obelisk at the summit of Mynydd Tal-y-Mignedd
