= Slieve Snaght =

Mountain in Donegal, Ireland

- Sliabh Sneachta
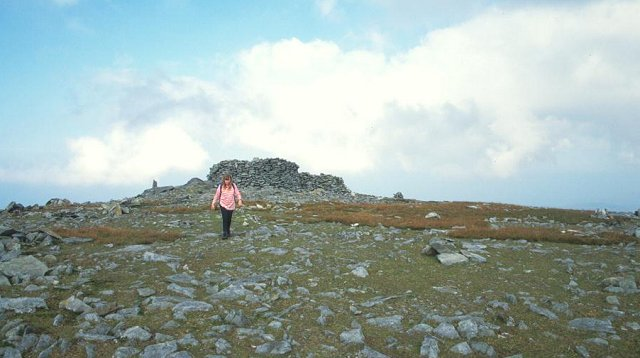
- Summit

Highest point
- Elevation: 615 m (2,018 ft)
- Prominence: 600 m (2,000 ft)
- Listing: P600, Marilyn, Hewitt
- Coordinates: 55.196462°N 7.33429°W

Geography
- Location within Ireland
- Location: County Donegal, Ireland
- OSI/OSNI grid: C424390

Slieve Snaght (Irish: Sliabh Sneachta, meaning 'snow mountain') is a mountain in the middle of the Inishowen peninsula of County Donegal, Ireland. It rises to a height of 615 metres (2,018 ft), making it the highest mountain in Inishowen, and is one of the northernmost mountains of Ireland. It should not be confused with the mountain of the same name in the nearby Derryveagh range. It includes the lesser summits of Slieve Main, Crocknamaddy and Damph.

== Name ==
The mountain is said to be so named because snow lies on its summit until late May. In Cath Maige Tuired ("The Battle of Moytura"), a tale from Irish mythology, Slieve Snaght is called one of the "twelve chief mountains" of Ireland. There is a tradition of pilgrimage to the top of Slieve Snaght at Lughnasa, and a holy well near the summit, called Tobar na Súl ("well of the eyes"), is said to cure blindness.

== History ==
In 1825, the summit was one of those used as a base for mapping Ireland as part of the Ordnance Survey's Principal Triangulation. The surveyors, which included Thomas Drummond, camped on the summit and built a wall to shield themselves from the weather. Drummond's team shone a limelight from Slieve Snaght towards Thomas Colby's team on Divis 67 miles (108 km) away, the first time a limelight was used for surveying.

== See also ==
- Lists of mountains in Ireland
- Lists of mountains and hills in the British Isles
- List of P600 mountains in the British Isles
- List of Marilyns in the British Isles
- List of Hewitt mountains in England, Wales and Ireland
