= Trum y Ddysgl =

Mountain in Snowdonia, North Wales

Coordinates: 53.0421608°N 4.1720484°W

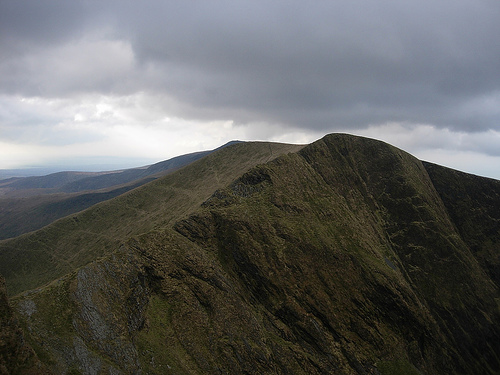
- Trum y Ddysgl from Mynydd Drws-y-coed

Highest point
- Elevation: 709 m (2,326 ft)
- Prominence: 204 m (669 ft)
- Listing: Marilyn, Hewitt, Nuttall

Naming
- Language of name: Welsh

Geography
- Location: Gwynedd, Wales
- Parent range: Moel Hebog
- Topo map: OS Landranger 115, OS Outdoor Leisure 17

Climbing
- Easiest route: Walk

Listed summits of Trum y Ddysgl
Name	Grid ref	Height	Status
Mynydd Drws-y-Coed		695 m (2,280 ft)	Hewitt, Nuttall
Mynydd Tal-y-Mignedd		653 m (2,142 ft)	Hewitt, Nuttall

Trum y Ddysgl is a mountain in Snowdonia, North Wales and is the second highest summit on the Nantlle Ridge. It is also one half of the two Marilyns that make up the ridge, the other being Craig Cwm Silyn.

The mountain has a dramatic morphology, with two arêtes, dark glacial cwms and rocky character. There are views of Snowdonia, with Mynydd Mawr, Snowdon (Yr Wyddfa) and Moel Hebog being close neighbours. The peak also has three other tops, which all in all form a rocky and relatively narrow part of the Nantlle ridge.
