= Nantlle Ridge =

Small mountain range in Snowdonia, Wales

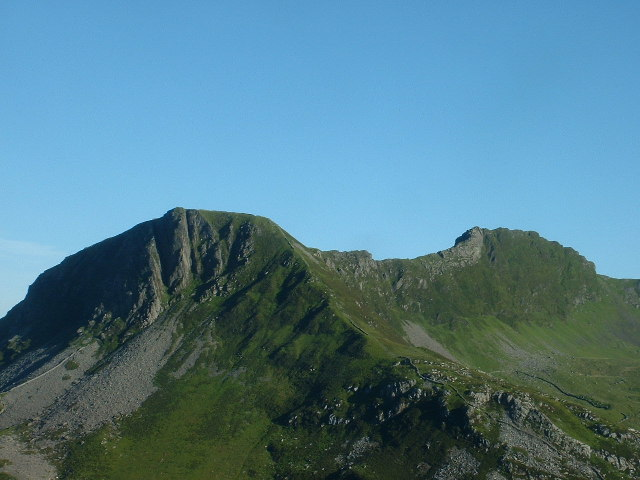
Y Garn (left), the usual starting point for the Nantlle Ridge walk, seen from the slopes of Mynydd Mawr

The Nantlle Ridge (Welsh: Crib Nantlle) is the name given to a small range of mountains in Snowdonia, north Wales which runs south-west from the village of Rhyd Ddu for a distance of about 9 km (6 mi), ending above Nebo in the Nantlle Valley.

The Nantlle Ridge offers excellent hill walking with fewer crowds than on the more popular parts of Snowdonia. It can be started from either end, but the Rhyd Ddu end tends to be the more popular. There are no great technical difficulties, although a little scrambling may be required on some parts of the ridge.

== Summits ==
Starting from the Rhyd Ddu end, the Nantlle Ridge is composed of the following peaks (see hill lists in the British Isles for an explanation of the terms "Nuttall", "Hewitt" and "Marilyn"):

- Y Garn (633 m or 2,077 ft); SH551526) — sub-Hewitt, Nuttall
- Mynydd Drws-y-Coed (695 m or 2,280 ft); SH548518) — Hewitt, Nuttall
- Trum y Ddysgl (709 m or 2,326 ft); SH544516) — Marilyn, Hewitt, Nuttall
- Mynydd Tal-y-Mignedd (653 m or 2,142 ft); SH535514) — Hewitt, Nuttall
- Craig Cwm Silyn (734 m or 2,408 ft); SH521501) — Marilyn, Hewitt, Nuttall
- Garnedd Goch (701 m or 2,300 ft); SH511495) — sub-Hewitt, Nuttall
- Mynydd Graig Goch (610 m or 2,000 ft); SH497485)— Hewitt, Nuttall

Craig Cwm Silyn is the highest point on the ridge, and can be reached by following the minor road running from Llanllyfni towards Llynnau Cwm Silyn, or as part of a traverse of the Nantlle Ridge from Rhyd Ddu. The crag of Craig yr Ogof is popular with rock climbers.
