= Rhyd-ddu =

Village in Wales

Coordinates: 53.054°N 4.136°W

Rhyd Ddu
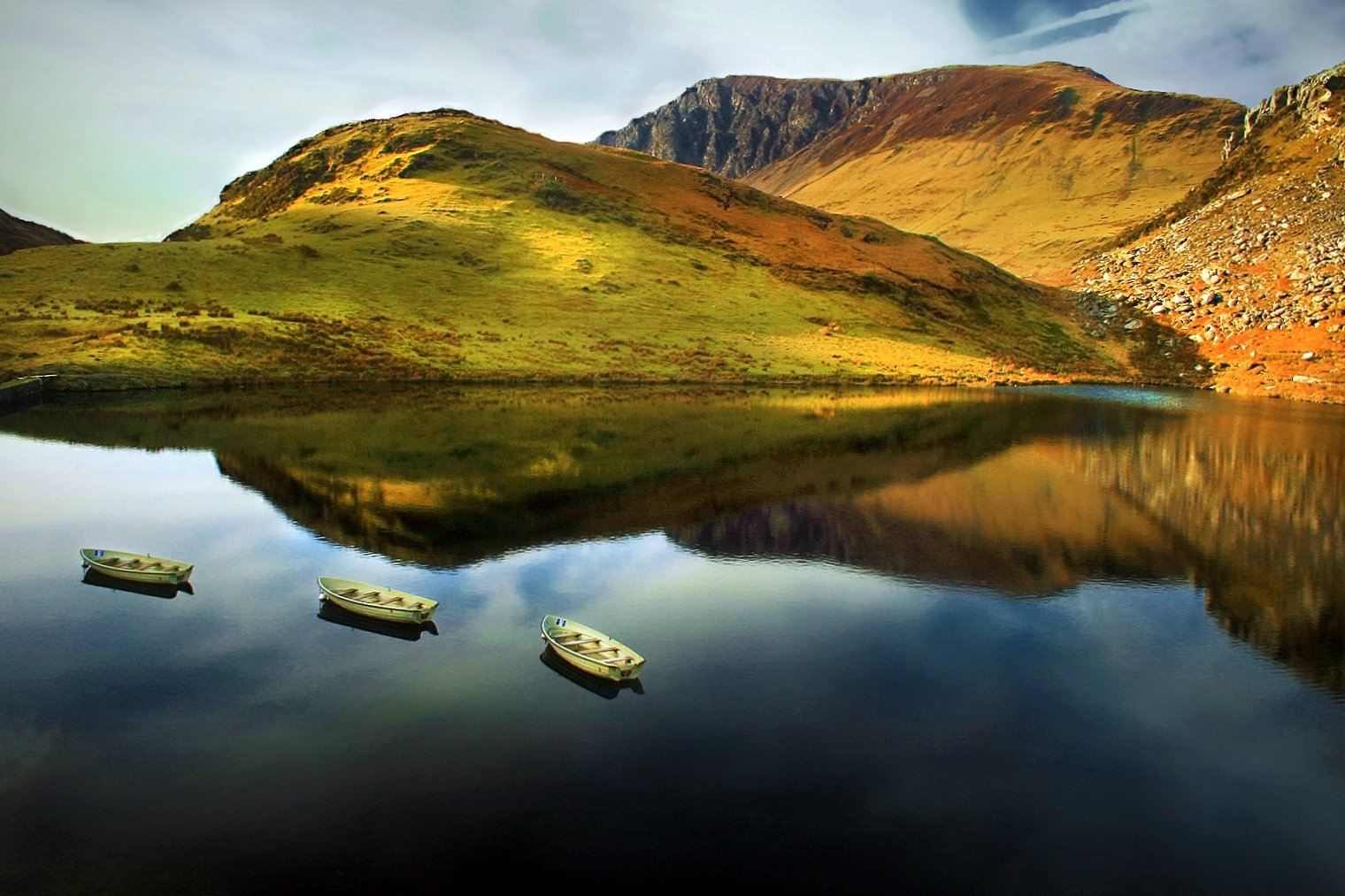
- Llyn y Dywarchen

- Location within Gwynedd
- Population: 37
- OS grid reference: SH568485
- Community: Betws Garmon
- Principal area: Gwynedd
- Preserved county: Gwynedd
- Country: Wales
- Sovereign state: United Kingdom
- Post town: Caernarfon
- Postcode district: LL54
- Dialling code: 01286
- Police: North Wales
- Fire: North Wales
- Ambulance: Welsh
- UK Parliament: Dwyfor Meirionnydd
- Senedd Cymru – Welsh Parliament: Arfon

Rhyd-ddu (/ˌriːdˈðiː/; Welsh: [ˌr̥iːdˈðiː]; lit. 'black ford') is a small village in Snowdonia, North Wales which is a starting point for walks up Snowdon (via the Rhyd Ddu Path), Moel Hebog, Yr Aran and the Nantlle Ridge.

It lies on the A4085 4 miles (6.4 km) north of Beddgelert, at its junction with the B4418 to Nantlle and Penygroes.

Rhyd Ddu railway station is one of the stops on the Welsh Highland Railway between Caernarfon and Porthmadog.

T. H. Parry-Williams, the poet, author and academic was born and raised at Rhyd-ddu. He twice won both the chair and the Crown at the National Eisteddfod, in 1912 and 1915.
