= Mynydd Drws-y-Coed =

Mountain in the United Kingdom

Coordinates: 53°02′43″N 04°09′50″W

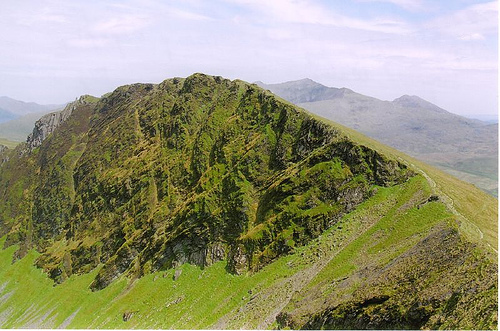
- Mynydd Drws-y-Coed from Trum y Ddysgl

Highest point
- Elevation: 695 m (2,280 ft)
- Prominence: 57 m (187 ft)
- Listing: Hewitt, Nuttall

Naming
- Language of name: Welsh

Geography
- Location: Gwynedd, Wales
- Parent range: Moel Hebog
- Topo map(s): OS Landranger 115, OS Outdoor Leisure 17

Climbing
- Easiest route: Walk, Scramble

Listed summits of Mynydd Drws-y-Coed
Name	Grid ref	Height	Status
Y Garn	SH551525	633 metres (2,077 ft)	sub Hewitt, Nuttall

Mynydd Drws-y-Coed is a peak on the Nantlle Ridge in Snowdonia, north Wales. It is located at the easterly end of the ridge, and is a subsidiary summit of Trum y Ddysgl. It has steep west-facing cliffs, the summit area being the highest point on a thin ridge.

The west side is very rocky and airy, and some scrambling is needed to attain the summit. A good head for heights will also be needed on the exposed regions.
