= Mynydd Mawr =

Mountain in Snowdonia, Wales

Coordinates: 53.06860°N 4.18200°W

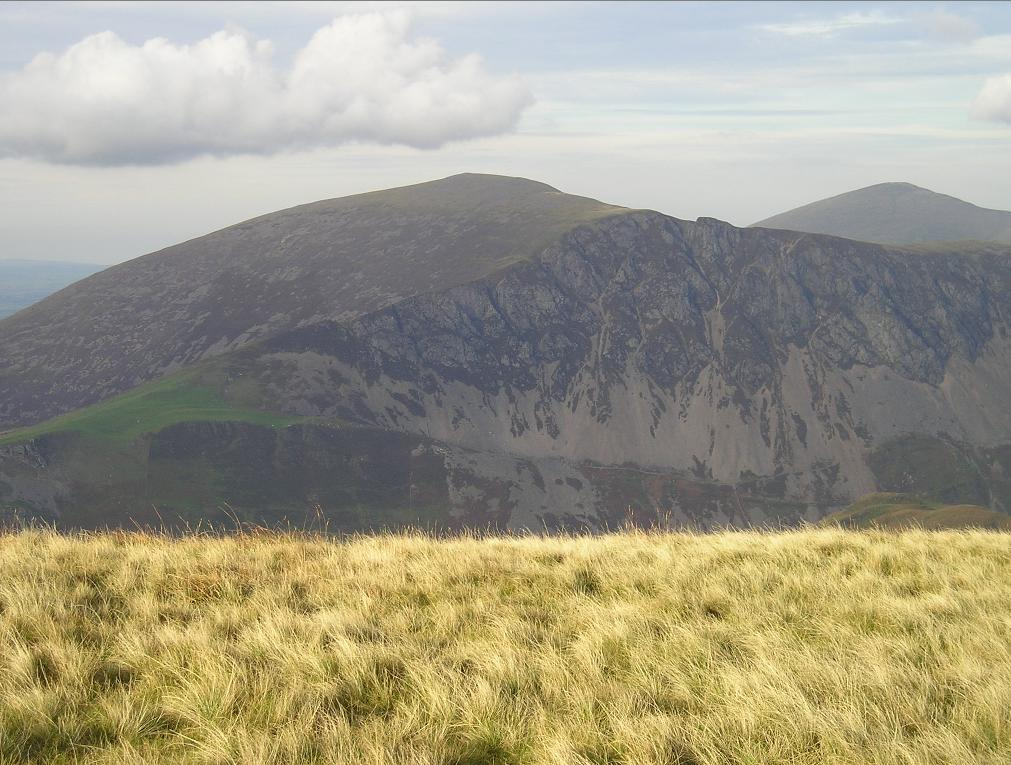
- Mynydd Mawr from Trum y Ddysgl

Highest point
- Elevation: 698 m (2,290 ft)
- Prominence: 462 m (1,516 ft)
- Parent peak: Moel Hebog
- Listing: Marilyn, Hewitt, Nuttall

Naming
- English translation: big mountain
- Language of name: Welsh
- Pronunciation: Welsh: [ˈmənɨð ˈmaur]

Geography
- Location: Gwynedd, Wales
- Parent range: Snowdonia
- OS grid: SH539546
- Topo map: OS Landranger 115

Mynydd Mawr (Welsh for 'big mountain') is a mountain in Snowdonia, North Wales, approximately 7 km (4.3 mi) west of Snowdon itself, overlooking Llyn Cwellyn and being the northern outlier of the Moel Hebog group. A popular ascent starts from Rhyd Ddu. On its western flank are the remains of ancient settlements and field systems. The profile of Mynydd Mawr from the north is often thought to resemble an elephant lying down, and consequently the mountain is often colloquially also called "Yr Eliffant" ('The Elephant'), or "Elephant Mountain" by non-Welsh speakers.

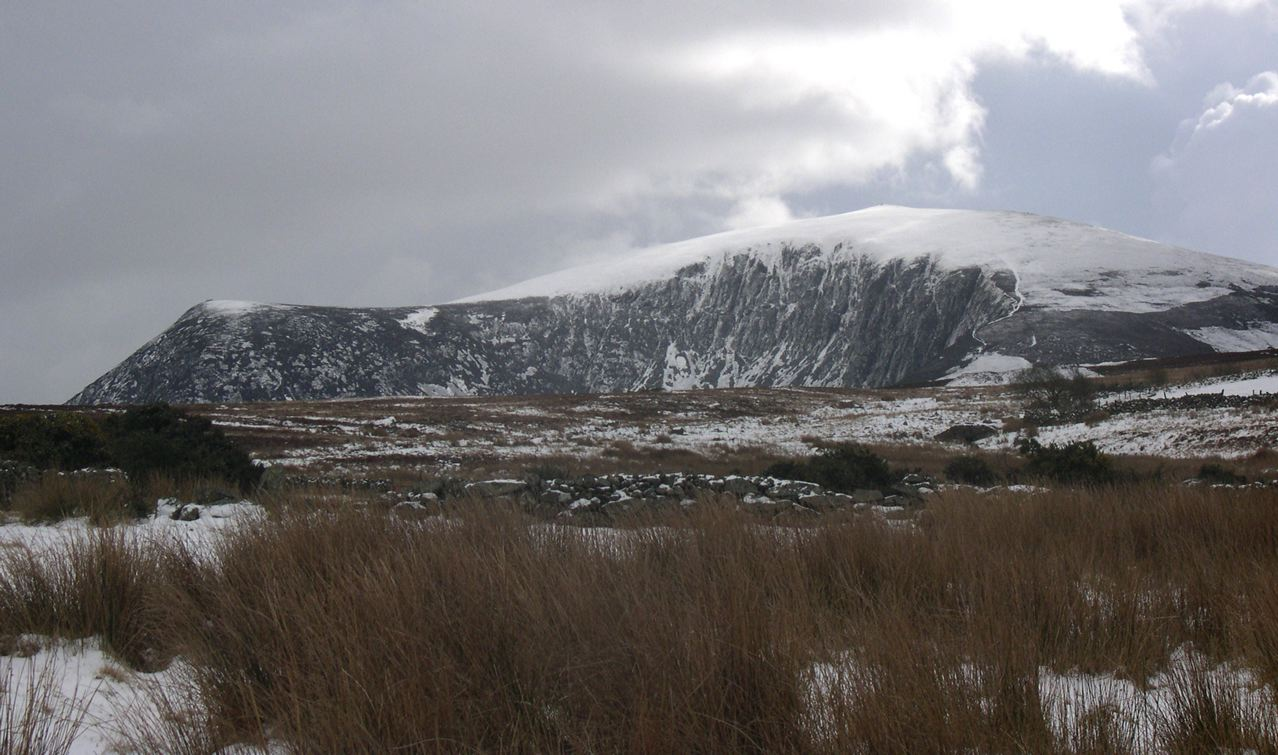
Mynydd Mawr from the north, showing the 'elephant's' head and back

The summit offers extensive views, on a clear day to the west, the views extend to the Llŷn Peninsula and Caernarfon Bay, from the north-west includes Anglesey. To the north lies Moel Eilio and to the east is Moel Hebog and Snowdon. On exceptionally clear days, the Wicklow Mountains in Ireland can be seen westwards across the Irish Sea from the summit.

== Geology ==
Mynydd Mawr features prominently in the geology of northwestern Wales as a distinct intrusion of riebeckite-bearing microgranite with a diameter of about two kilometres. The intrusion is set within Upper Cambrian and Ordovician rocks, which it has metamorphosed along its boundaries, creating a noticeable aureole of altered rock extending about half a kilometre outward from the intrusion. This aureole is particularly extensive along the northern side, suggesting either a less steep intrusive boundary or perhaps an underlying extension of the microgranite in this area.

The microgranite itself varies in both colour and grain size. The most common variant is a fine-grained green rock containing small crystals (microphenocrysts) of feldspar and altered riebeckite that are visible with a magnifying glass. A coarser, pink variety occurs in the central portions of the intrusion, particularly visible in the gullies of Craig Cwmbychan. The rock weathers deeply and tends to break along closely-spaced joints, creating the distinctive cliff formations seen at Craig Cwmbychan, where vertical columns reach heights of up to 90 metres.

The geological evidence indicates that the Mynydd Mawr intrusion was emplaced prior to the major phase of Caledonian deformation that affected the region. This is demonstrated by the presence of metamorphic spots in the surrounding rocks that have been flattened in the plane of the regional cleavage, and by the deflection of this cleavage around the intrusion.

The surrounding area features a complex sequence of rocks ranging from the Precambrian to the Ordovician, with the strata arranged in a series of folds trending northeast-southwest. The Mynydd Mawr intrusion appears to have been emplaced into an anticlinal structure within the Ffestiniog Series of the Upper Cambrian.

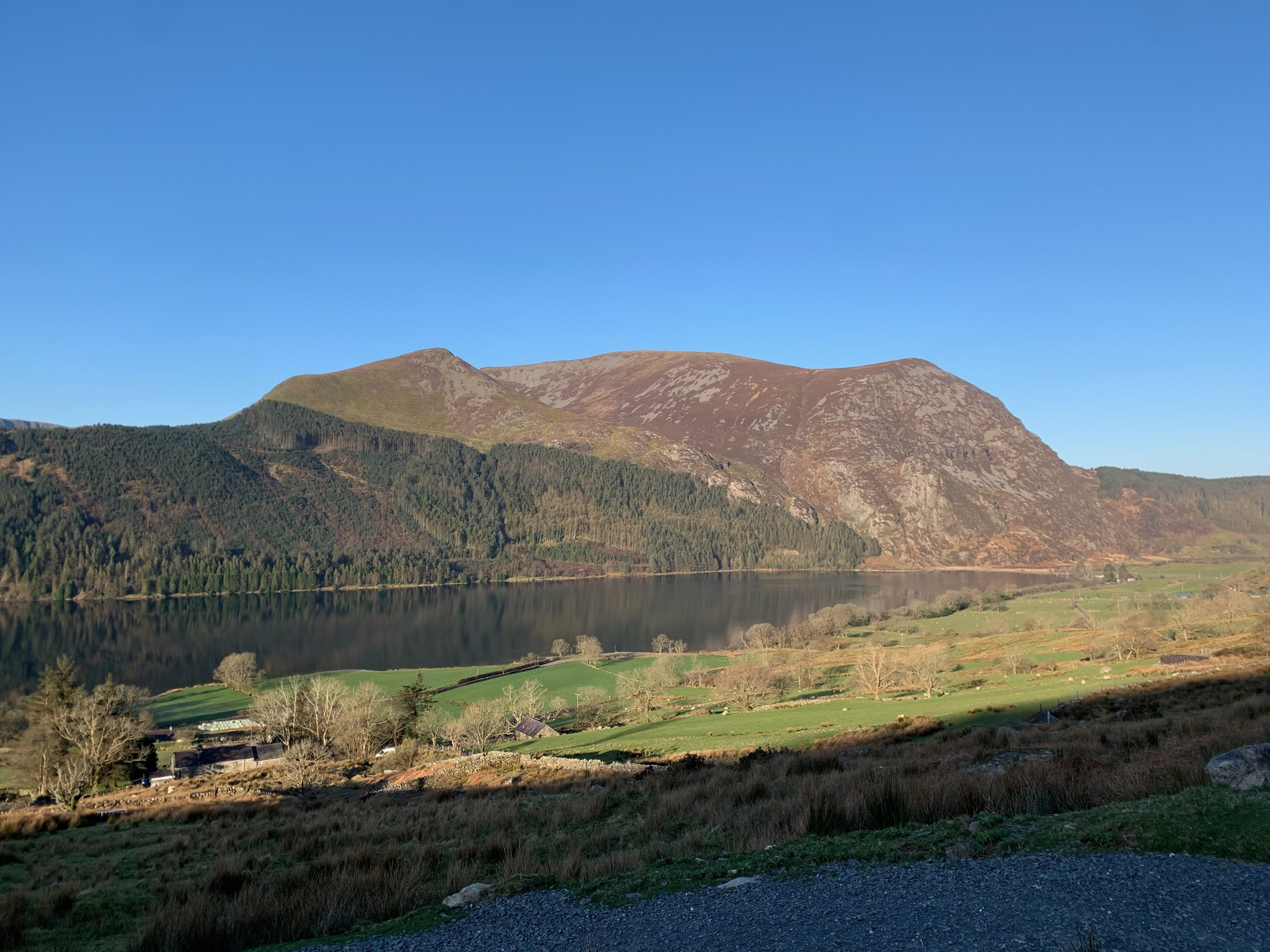
Mynydd Mawr with Cwellyn

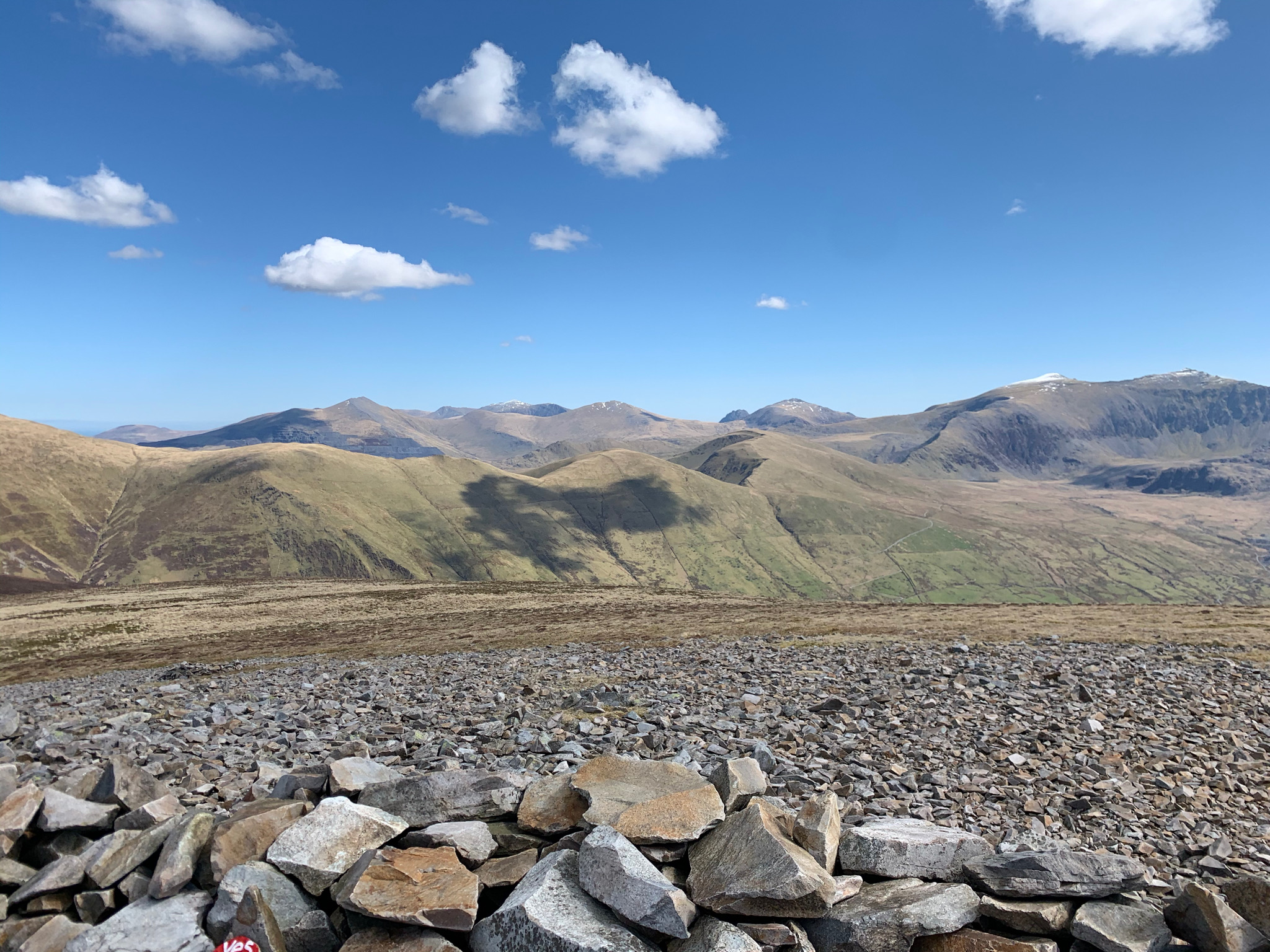
Mynydd Mawr and the Glyderau

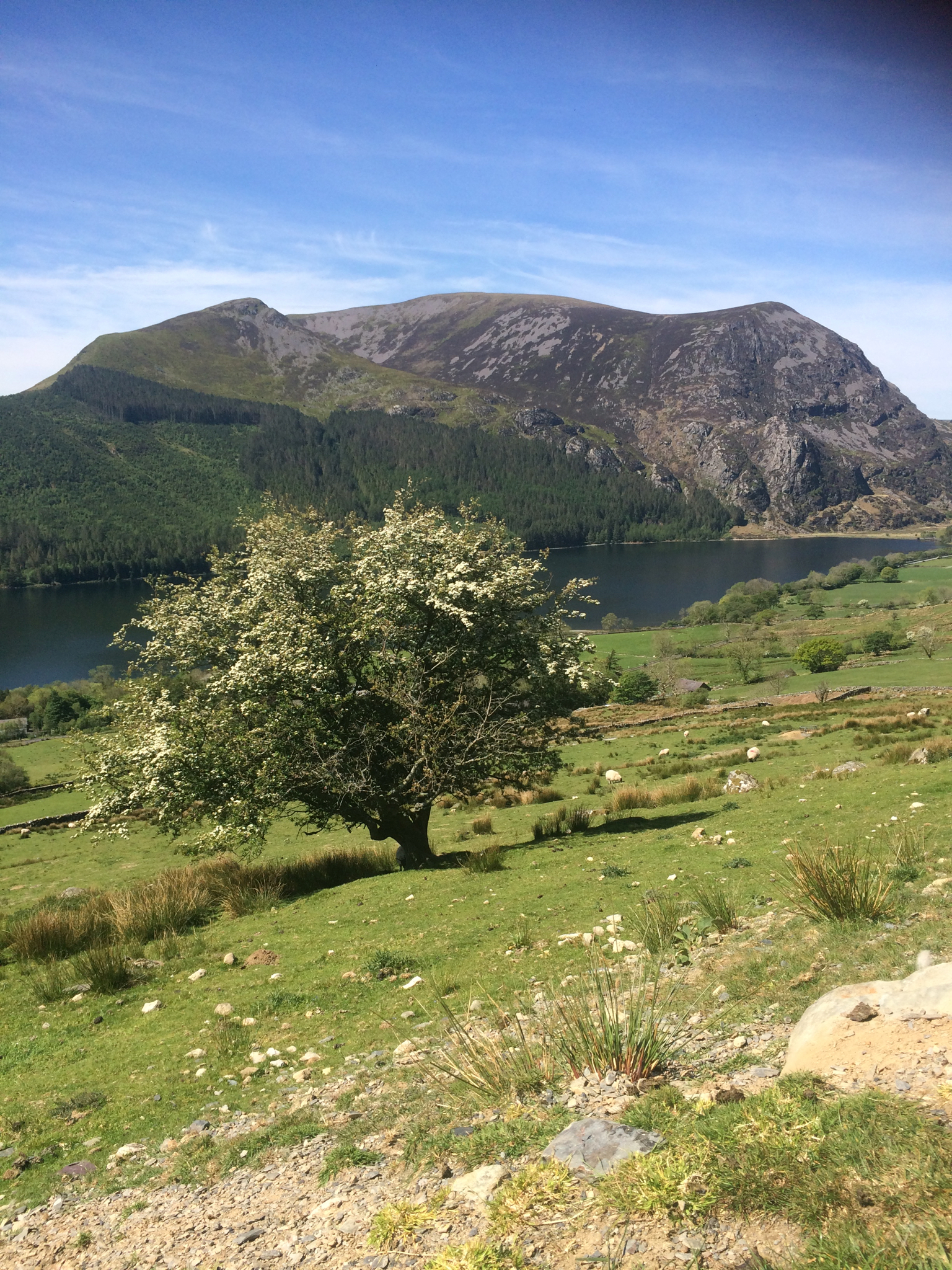
Mynydd Mawr from Cwellyn
