= List of Hewitt mountains in England, Wales and Ireland =

Hills in England, Wales and Ireland over 2000 feet

Hewitt
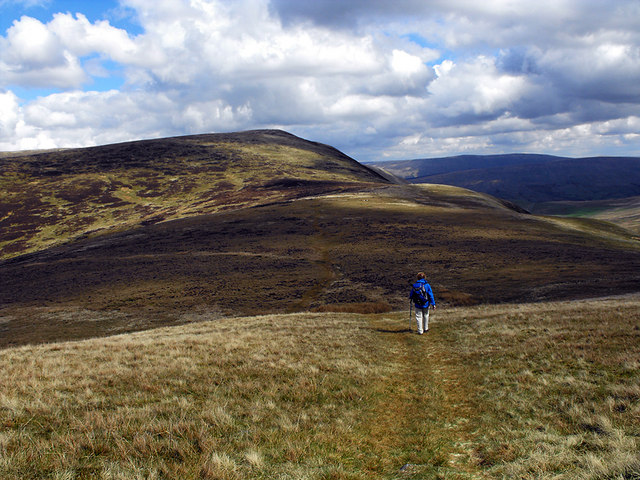
- Calf Top in Cumbria, the smallest Hewitt which was confirmed in 2016 as almost exactly 2,000 ft. (Note: The Ordnance Survey confirmed in 2016 that Calf Top was 6 millimetres above the 609.6 m threshold for a 2,000 ft mountain, and confirmed Calf Top as England's "last mountain".)

Highest point
- Elevation: over 2,000 ft (609.6 m)
- Prominence: over 30 m (98.4 ft)

Geography
- Location: 524 British Isles: 209 Ireland (Note: As of October 2018, the Irish MountainViews Online Database, list the prominence of Knockbrinnea (W) as 29m, and Carrignabinnia as 27 m, and thus they do not qualify as Irish Arderins, which means that MountainViews does not classify these two peaks as Hewitts; the total number of Irish Arderins over 2,000 ft is thus 207); 180 England; 135 Wales

This is a list of Hewitt mountains in England, Wales and Ireland by height. Hewitts are defined as "Hills in England, Wales and Ireland over two thousand" feet 2,000 feet (609.6 m) in height, the general requirement to be called a "mountain" in the British Isles, and with a prominence above 30 metres (98.4 ft); a mix of imperial and metric thresholds.

The Hewitt classification was suggested by Alan Dawson in his 1992 book The Relative Hills of Britain. Dawson originally called his Hewitts "Sweats", from "Summits – Wales and England Above Two thousand", before settling on the label Hewitt. In a series of three booklets edited by Dave Hewitt, the list of English Hewitts was published in 1997, and the list of Welsh Hewitts was also published in 1997, and the list of Irish Hewitts was published in 1998. Hewitts were designed to address one of the criticisms of the 1990 Nuttall classification, by requiring hills to have a relative height of 30 metres (98 ft), a threshold that the UIAA had set down in 1994 for an "independent" peak. In 2010, Dawson replaced the Hewitts with Simms, a fully metric equivalent of the Hewitt, with a 600 metres (1,969 ft) height threshold and 30 metres (98 ft) prominence threshold, however Dawson still maintains the Hewitt list.

As of October 2018 there were 524 Hewitts identified, with 209 in Ireland, 180 in England, and 135 in Wales, which is 1 less than the 1997 lists of 525 Hewitts. (Note: In 1997, when the TACit booklets were published on Hewitts and Marilyns, Dawson stated that: "There are 525 Hewitts in total: 137 in Wales, 178 in England and 211 in Ireland (Black Mountain is in both England and Wales)".) Climbers who climb all of the Hewitts are called Hewitteers, with the first English & Welsh Hewitteer being Edward Moss on 22 July 1951.

On 5 December 2018, the BBC announced that Foel Penolau had been re-surveyed and promoted to Hewitt status (and by definition, to Simm status). As has Foel Cedig.

== Hewitt mountains by height ==
This list is from the Database of British and Irish Hills ("DoBIH") in October 2018, and are peaks the DoBIH marks as being Hewitts ("Hew"). (Note: The Database of British and Irish Hills ("DoBIH") is the most referenced database for the classification of peaks in the British Isles, and the DoBIH is licensed under a "Creative Commons Attribution 3.0 Unported License".) Alan Dawson updates the list of Hewitts from time to time, and the DoBIH also updates their measurements as more surveys are recorded, so these tables should not be amended or updated unless the entire DoBIH data is re-downloaded again.

Country/Regional Top: Highest mountain in England, Wales, or Ireland

Hewitts, ranked by height (DoBIH, October 2018)
Height Total	Region	Height Region	Name	County	Height (m)	Prom. (m)	Height (ft)	Prom. (ft)	Map Sec.	Topo Map	OS Grid Reference	Classification (§ DoBIH codes)
1	Wales	1	Snowdon; Highest in Wales	Gwynedd	1,085	1,039	3,560	3,409	30B	115	SH609543	Ma,F,Sim,Hew,N,CoH,CoU,CoA
2	Wales	2	Crib y Ddysgl	Gwynedd	1,065	72	3,495	236	30B	115	SH610551	F,Sim,Hew,N
3	Wales	3	Carnedd Llewelyn	Conwy/Gwynedd	1,064	750	3,491	2,461	30B	115	SH683643	Ma,F,Sim,Hew,N,CoU
4	Wales	4	Carnedd Dafydd	Conwy/Gwynedd	1,044	111	3,425	364	30B	115	SH662630	Hu,F,Sim,Hew,N
5	Ireland	1	Carrauntoohil; Highest in Ireland	Kerry	1,039	1,039	3,407	3,407	50C	78	V803844	Ma,F,Sim,Hew,Dil,A,VL,CoH,CoU
6	Ireland	2	Beenkeragh	Kerry	1,008	91	3,308	298	50C	78	V801852	F,Sim,Hew,Dil,A,VL,sHu
7	Wales	5	Glyder Fawr	Conwy/Gwynedd	1,001	642	3,284	2,106	30B	115	SH642579	Ma,F,Sim,Hew,N
8	Ireland	3	Caher	Kerry	1,000	100	3,281	327	50C	78	V792838	F,Sim,Hew,Dil,A,VL,sHu
9	Wales	6	Glyder Fach	Conwy/Gwynedd	994	75	3,262	244	30B	115	SH656582	F,Sim,Hew,N
10	Ireland	4	Cnoc na Peiste	Kerry	988	254	3,241	833	50C	78	V835841	Ma,F,Sim,Hew,Dil,A,VL
11	England	1	Scafell Pike; Highest in England	Cumbria	978	912	3,209	2,992	34B	89 90	NY215072	Ma,F,Sim,Hew,N,W,B, Sy,Fel,CoH,CoU,CoA
12	Wales	7	Pen yr Ole Wen	Conwy	978	45	3,209	148	30B	115	SH655619	F,Sim,Hew,N
13	Wales	8	Foel Grach	Conwy/Gwynedd	975	42	3,200	137	30B	115	SH688659	F,Sim,Hew,N
14	Ireland	5	Maolan Bui	Kerry	973	41	3,192	135	50C	78	V832838	F,Sim,Hew,Dil,A,VL
15	England	2	Scafell	Cumbria	964	132	3,162	434	34B	89 90	NY206064	Hu,F,Sim,Hew,N,W,B,Sy,Fel
16	Wales	9	Yr Elen	Gwynedd	962	57	3,156	187	30B	115	SH673651	F,Sim,Hew,N
17	Ireland	6	Cnoc an Chuillinn	Kerry	958	54	3,143	177	50C	78	V823833	F,Sim,Hew,Dil,A,VL
18	Ireland	7	Na Cnamha	Kerry	957	37	3,138	122	50C	78	V800846	F,Sim,Hew,A,VL
19	Ireland	8	Brandon Mountain	Kerry	952	927	3,122	3,041	49A	70	Q460116	Ma,F,Sim,Hew,Dil,A,VL
20	England	3	Helvellyn	Cumbria	950	712	3,117	2,336	34C	90	NY342151	Ma,F,Sim,Hew,N,W,B,Sy,Fel,CoH
21	Wales	10	Y Garn	Gwynedd	947	236	3,107	774	30B	115	SH630595	Ma,F,Sim,Hew,N
22	Wales	11	Foel-fras	Conwy/ Gwynedd	944	63	3,097	206	30B	115	SH696681	F,Sim,Hew,N
23	Ireland	9	The Big Gun	Kerry	939	70	3,081	230	50C	78	V840845	F,Sim,Hew,Dil,A,VL
24	England	4	Broad Crag	Cumbria	935	58	3,069	189	34B	89 90	NY218075	F,Sim,Hew,N,B,Sy
25	Ireland	10	Cruach Mhor	Kerry	932	32	3,058	105	50C	78	V840848	F,Sim,Hew,Dil,A,VL
26	England	5	Skiddaw	Cumbria	931	709	3,054	2,326	34A	89 90	NY260290	Ma,F,Sim,Hew,N,W,B,Sy,Fel
27	England	6	Ill Crag	Cumbria	931	49	3,054	159	34B	89 90	NY223073	F,Sim,Hew,N,B,Sy
28	Wales	12	Garnedd Uchaf	Gwynedd	925	33	3,035	108	30B	115	SH686669	F,Sim,Hew,N
29	Ireland	11	Lugnaquilla	Wicklow	925	849	3,035	2,785	55A	56	T032917	Ma,F,Sim,Hew,Dil, A,VL,CoH,CoU
30	Wales	13	Elidir Fawr	Gwynedd	924	212	3,031	696	30B	115	SH611612	Ma,F,Sim,Hew,N
31	Wales	14	Crib Goch	Gwynedd	923	65	3,028	213	30B	115	SH624551	F,Sim,Hew,N
32	Ireland	12	Galtymore	Limerick/ Tipperary	918	821	3,011	2,694	53A	74	R878237	Ma,F,Sim,Hew,Dil,A,VL,CoH,CoU
33	Wales	15	Tryfan	Conwy	918	191	3,010	627	30B	115	SH664593	Ma,F,Sim,Hew,N
34	England	7	Great End	Cumbria	910	56	2,984	184	34B	89 90	NY226083	Sim,Hew,N,W,B,Sy,Fel
35	Wales	16	Aran Fawddwy	Gwynedd	905	670	2,969	2,198	30E	124 125	SH862223	Ma,Sim,Hew,N,CoH
36	England	8	Bowfell	Cumbria	903	148	2,962	486	34B	89 90	NY244064	Hu,Sim,Hew,N,sMa,W,B,Sy,Fel
37	England	9	Great Gable	Cumbria	899	425	2,949	1,394	34B	89 90	NY211103	Ma,Sim,Hew,N,W,B,Sy,Fel
38	Wales	17	Y Lliwedd	Gwynedd	898	154	2,946	505	30B	115	SH622533	Ma,Sim,Hew,N
39	England	10	Cross Fell	Cumbria	893	651	2,930	2,136	35A	91	NY687343	Ma,Sim,Hew,N
40	Wales	18	Cadair Idris	Gwynedd	893	608	2,929	1,995	30F	124	SH711130	Ma,Sim,Hew,N
41	England	11	Pillar	Cumbria	892	348	2,927	1,142	34B	89 90	NY171121	Ma,Sim,Hew,N,W,B,Sy,Fel
42	England	12	Catstye Cam	Cumbria	890	63	2,920	207	34C	90	NY348158	Sim,Hew,N,W,B,Sy,Fel
43	Wales	19	Pen y Fan	Powys	886	672	2,907	2,205	32A	160	SO012215	Ma,Sim,Hew,N,CoH,CoU,CoA
44	Wales	20	Aran Benllyn	Gwynedd	885	50	2,904	164	30E	124 125	SH867242	Sim,Hew,N
45	England	13	Esk Pike	Cumbria	885	112	2,904	367	34B	89 90	NY236075	Hu,Sim,Hew,N,W,B,Sy,Fel
46	England	14	Raise	Cumbria	883	91	2,897	299	34C	90	NY342174	Sim,Hew,N,sHu,W,B,Sy,Fel
47	England	15	Fairfield	Cumbria	873	299	2,864	981	34C	90	NY358117	Ma,Sim,Hew,N,W,B,Sy,Fel
48	Wales	21	Moel Siabod	Conwy	872	600	2,862	1,968	30B	115	SH705546	Ma,Sim,Hew,N
49	Wales	22	Erw y Ddafad-ddu	Gwynedd	872	37	2,861	121	30E	124 125	SH864233	Sim,Hew,N
50	England	16	Blencathra	Cumbria	868	461	2,848	1,512	34A	90	NY323277	Ma,Sim,Hew,N,W,B,Sy,Fel
51	England	17	Skiddaw Little Man	Cumbria	865	61	2,838	200	34A	89 90	NY266277	Sim,Hew,N,W,B,Sy,Fel
52	Wales	23	Mynydd Moel	Gwynedd	863	67	2,831	220	30F	124	SH727136	Sim,Hew,N
53	England	18	White Side	Cumbria	863	42	2,831	138	34C	90	NY337166	Sim,Hew,N,W,B,Sy,Fel
54	England	19	Crinkle Crags [Long Top]	Cumbria	859	139	2,818	456	34B	89 90	NY248048	Hu,Sim,Hew,N,W,B,Sy,Fel
55	England	20	Dollywaggon Pike	Cumbria	858	50	2,815	164	34C	90	NY346130	Sim,Hew,N,W,B,Sy,Fel
56	England	21	Great Dodd	Cumbria	857	109	2,812	358	34C	90	NY342205	Hu,Sim,Hew,N,W,B,Sy,Fel
57	Wales	24	Arenig Fawr	Gwynedd	854	479	2,802	1,572	30D	124 125	SH827369	Ma,Sim,Hew,N
58	Ireland	13	Knockbrinnea (W)	Kerry	854	30	2,802	98	50C	78	V807858	Sim,Hew,Dil,VL
59	England	22	Grasmoor	Cumbria	852	519	2,795	1,703	34B	89 90	NY174203	Ma,Sim,Hew,N,W,B,Sy,Fel
60	Ireland	14	Baurtregaum	Kerry	851	642	2,792	2,106	49B	71	Q749076	Ma,Sim,Hew,Dil,A,VL
61	Ireland	15	Slieve Donard	Down	850	825	2,789	2,707	43B	29	J358276	Ma,Sim,Hew,Dil,A, VL,CoH,CoU
62	Wales	25	Llwytmor	Gwynedd	849	73	2,785	240	30B	115	SH689692	Sim,Hew,N
63	Ireland	16	Mullaghcleevaun	Wicklow	849	373	2,785	1,224	55B	56	O067070	Ma,Sim,Hew,Dil,A,VL
64	England	23	Great Dun Fell	Cumbria	848	76	2,782	249	35A	91	NY710321	Sim,Hew,N
65	Ireland	17	Skregmore	Kerry	848	50	2,781	164	50C	78	V792860	Sim,Hew,Dil,A,VL
66	Ireland	18	Cnoc na Toinne	Kerry	845	77	2,772	253	50C	78	V811834	Sim,Hew,Dil,A,VL
67	England	24	Stybarrow Dodd	Cumbria	843	68	2,766	223	34C	90	NY343189	Sim,Hew,N,W,B,Sy,Fel
68	England	25	Little Dun Fell	Cumbria	842	61	2,762	200	35A	91	NY704330	Sim,Hew,N
69	England	26	St Sunday Crag	Cumbria	841	159	2,759	522	34C	90	NY369133	Ma,Sim,Hew,N,W,B,Sy,Fel
70	England	27	Scoat Fell	Cumbria	841	86	2,759	282	34B	89	NY159113	Sim,Hew,N,W,B,Sy,Fel
71	Ireland	19	Brandon Peak	Kerry	840	178	2,756	584	49A	70	Q472094	Ma,Sim,Hew,Dil,A,VL
72	England	28	Crag Hill	Cumbria	839	117	2,753	384	34B	89 90	NY192203	Hu,Sim,Hew,N,W,B,Sy,Fel
73	Ireland	20	Mangerton	Kerry	838	580	2,750	1,903	52A	78	V980807	Ma,Sim,Hew,Dil,A,VL
74	Ireland	21	Caherconree	Kerry	835	129	2,740	423	49B	71	Q733072	Hu,Sim,Hew,Dil,A,VL
75	England	29	Crinkle Crags South Top	Cumbria	834	32	2,736	105	34B	89 90	NY250045	Sim,Hew,N,B,Sy
76	Wales	26	Pen yr Helgi Du	Conwy	833	85	2,732	278	30B	115	SH697630	Sim,Hew,N
77	Wales	27	Cadair Berwyn	Powys	832	346	2,730	1,135	30E	125	SJ071323	Ma,Sim,Hew,N,CoH,CoA
78	Ireland	22	Purple Mountain	Kerry	832	593	2,730	1,946	50C	78	V886851	Ma,Sim,Hew,Dil,A,VL
79	Wales	28	Foel-goch	Gwynedd	831	76	2,726	249	30B	115	SH628612	Sim,Hew,N
80	England	30	High Street	Cumbria	828	373	2,717	1,224	34C	90	NY440110	Ma,Sim,Hew,N,W,B,Sy,Fel
81	England	31	Black Crag	Cumbria	828	34	2,717	112	34B	89	NY166116	Sim,Hew,N,B,Sy
82	Wales	29	Moel Sych	Denbighshire/ Powys	827	34	2,712	111	30E	125	SJ066318	Sim,Hew,N,CoH,CoU
83	England	32	Red Pike (Wasdale)	Cumbria	826	62	2,710	203	34B	89	NY165106	Sim,Hew,N,W,B,Sy,Fel
84	Ireland	23	Beenoskee	Kerry	826	492	2,710	1,614	49B	70	Q580088	Ma,Sim,Hew,Dil,A,VL
85	Ireland	24	Lyracappul	Limerick	825	100	2,708	329	53A	74	R845231	Hu,Sim,Hew,Dil,A,VL
86	England	33	Hart Crag	Cumbria	822	48	2,697	157	34C	90	NY369112	Sim,Hew,N,W,B,Sy,Fel
87	Ireland	25	Carrignabinnia	Limerick	822	30	2,697	98	53A	74	R850236	Sim,Hew,VL
88	Ireland	26	Benagh	Kerry	822	54	2,697	177	49A	70	Q469119	Sim,Hew,A,VL
89	Wales	30	Carnedd y Filiast	Gwynedd	821	76	2,694	249	30B	115	SH620627	Sim,Hew,N
90	Ireland	27	Tonelagee	Wicklow	817	204	2,680	669	55B	56	O085015	Ma,Sim,Hew,Dil,A,VL
91	England	34	The Cheviot	Northumberland	815	556	2,674	1,824	33	74 75	NT909205	Ma,Sim,Hew,N,CoH,CoU,CoA
92	England	35	Shelter Crags	Cumbria	815	31	2,674	102	34B	89 90	NY249053	Sim,Hew,N,B,Sy
93	Ireland	28	Mweelrea	Mayo	814	778	2,671	2,552	47A	37	L789668	Ma,Sim,Hew,Dil,A,VL,CoH,CoU
94	Wales	31	Waun Fach	Powys	811	622	2,661	2,041	32A	161	SO215299	Ma,Sim,Hew,N
95	Wales	32	Cyfrwy	Gwynedd	811	36	2,661	118	30F	124	SH703133	Sim,Hew,N
96	Ireland	29	Faha Ridge	Kerry	809	34	2,654	112	49A	70	Q464120	Sim,Hew,A,VL
97	England	36	High Stile	Cumbria	807	362	2,648	1,188	34B	89 90	NY170148	Ma,Sim,Hew,N,B,Sy,Fel
98	England	37	Lingmell	Cumbria	807	72	2,648	236	34B	89 90	NY209081	Sim,Hew,N,W,B,Sy,Fel
99	Ireland	30	Nephin	Mayo	806	768	2,644	2,520	46B	23 31	G103079	Ma,Sim,Hew,Dil,A,VL
100	Wales	33	Y Foel Goch	Conwy	805	63	2,641	207	30B	115	SH677582	Sim,Hew,N
101	Ireland	31	Ben Lugmore	Mayo	803	158	2,635	518	47A	37	L811673	Ma,Sim,Hew,Dil,A,VL
102	Wales	34	Fan Brycheiniog	Powys	803	425	2,633	1,394	32A	160	SN824220	Ma,Sim,Hew,N
103	England	38	The Old Man of Coniston	Cumbria	802	415	2,633	1,362	34D	96 97	SD272978	Ma,Sim,Hew,N,W,B,Sy,Fel,CoH
104	England	39	Swirl How	Cumbria	802	120	2,633	394	34D	89 90	NY272005	Hu,Sim,Hew,N,W,B,Sy,Fel
105	England	40	Kirk Fell	Cumbria	802	181	2,631	594	34B	89 90	NY194104	Ma,Sim,Hew,N,W,B,Sy,Fel
106	England	41	High Raise (High Street)	Cumbria	802	88	2,631	289	34C	90	NY448134	Sim,Hew,N,W,B,Sy,Fel
107	Ireland	32	Greenane	Tipperary	802	160	2,631	525	53A	74	R925239	Ma,Sim,Hew,Dil,A,VL
108	England	42	Green Gable	Cumbria	801	50	2,628	164	34B	89 90	NY214107	Sim,Hew,N,W,B,Sy,Fel
109	Wales	35	Pen y Gadair Fawr	Powys	800	47	2,625	154	32A	161	SO229287	Sim,Hew,N
110	Ireland	33	Galtybeg	Tipperary	799	80	2,622	263	53A	74	R889240	Sim,Hew,Dil,A,VL
111	Wales	36	Pen Llithrig y Wrach	Conwy	799	180	2,620	592	30B	115	SH716622	Ma,Sim,Hew,N
112	Ireland	34	Stradbally Mountain	Kerry	798	50	2,618	164	49B	70	Q587091	Sim,Hew,Dil,A,VL
113	England	43	Haycock	Cumbria	797	94	2,615	308	34B	89	NY144107	Sim,Hew,N,sHu,W,B,Sy,Fel
114	Ireland	35	Ben Bury	Mayo	795	60	2,608	197	47A	37	L802682	Sim,Hew,Dil,A,VL
115	Wales	37	Cribyn	Powys	795	130	2,608	427	32A	160	SO023213	Hu,Sim,Hew,N
116	England	44	Green Side	Cumbria	795	30	2,608	98	34C	90	NY352187	Sim,Hew,N,B,Sy
117	Ireland	36	Mullaghcleevaun East Top	Wicklow	795	41	2,608	135	55B	56	O082067	Sim,Hew,Dil,A,VL
118	Ireland	37	Mount Leinster	Carlow/ Wexford	794	726	2,606	2,382	54B	68	S826525	Ma,Sim,Hew,Dil,A,VL,CoH,CoU
119	England	45	Knock Fell	Cumbria	794	48	2,605	157	35A	91	NY721302	Sim,Hew,N
120	Ireland	38	Corrigasleggaun	Wicklow	794	45	2,605	148	55A	56	T047910	Sim,Hew,Dil,A,VL
121	Ireland	39	Ben Lugmore East Top	Mayo	793	32	2,602	105	47A	37	L815672	Sim,Hew,A,VL
122	Ireland	40	Knockmealdown	Tipperary/ Waterford	792	678	2,600	2,224	54A	74	S057084	Ma,Sim,Hew,Dil,A,VL,CoH,CoU
123	England	46	Dove Crag	Cumbria	792	50	2,598	164	34C	90	NY374104	Sim,Hew,N,W,B,Sy,Fel
124	England	47	Rampsgill Head	Cumbria	792	41	2,598	135	34C	90	NY443128	Sim,Hew,N,W,B,Sy,Fel
125	Ireland	41	Fauscoum	Waterford	792	628	2,598	2,060	54A	75	S316105	Ma,Sim,Hew,Dil,A,VL
126	Wales	38	Craig Cwm Amarch	Gwynedd	792	79	2,598	260	30F	124	SH710121	Sim,Hew,N
127	England	48	Grisedale Pike	Cumbria	791	189	2,595	620	34B	89 90	NY198225	Ma,Sim,Hew,N,W,B,Sy,Fel
128	Ireland	42	Ben Lugmore West Top	Mayo	790	45	2,592	148	47A	37	L805676	Sim,Hew,A,VL
129	England	49	Mickle Fell	Durham	790	212	2,592	696	35A	91 92	NY806245	Ma,Sim,Hew,N,CoH,CoU,CoA
130	England	50	Kirk Fell East Top	Cumbria	787	36	2,582	118	34B	89 90	NY199107	Sim,Hew,N,B,Sy
131	Ireland	43	Greenane West	Tipperary	786	34	2,579	112	53A	74	R910239	Sim,Hew,Dil,A,VL
132	England	51	Allen Crags	Cumbria	785	60	2,575	197	34B	89 90	NY236085	Sim,Hew,N,W,B,Sy,Fel
133	England	52	Thornthwaite Crag	Cumbria	784	31	2,572	102	34C	90	NY431100	Sim,Hew,N,W,B,Sy,Fel
134	Ireland	44	Stumpa Duloigh	Kerry	784	494	2,572	1,621	50B	78	V786793	Ma,Sim,Hew,Dil,A,VL
135	Wales	39	Cadair Bronwen	Denbighshire/ Wrexham	783	73	2,570	240	30E	125	SJ077346	Sim,Hew,N
136	Ireland	45	Temple Hill	Limerick	783	188	2,569	617	53A	74	R833218	Ma,Sim,Hew,Dil,A,VL
137	Wales	40	Moel Hebog	Gwynedd	783	585	2,569	1,919	30B	115	SH564469	Ma,Sim,Hew,N
138	England	53	Glaramara	Cumbria	783	121	2,569	397	34B	89 90	NY245104	Hu,Sim,Hew,N,W,B,Sy,Fel
139	Ireland	46	Mangerton North Top	Kerry	782	66	2,566	217	52A	78	V984818	Sim,Hew,Dil,A,VL
140	Wales	41	Glasgwm	Gwynedd	779	215	2,556	705	30E	124 125	SH836194	Ma,Sim,Hew,N
141	England	54	Harter Fell (Mardale)	Cumbria	779	149	2,556	490	34C	90	NY459093	Hu,Sim,Hew,N,sMa,W,B,Sy,Fel
142	England	55	Dow Crag	Cumbria	778	129	2,552	423	34D	96 97	SD262977	Hu,Sim,Hew,N,W,B,Sy,Fel
143	England	56	Red Screes	Cumbria	776	260	2,546	853	34C	90	NY396087	Ma,Sim,Hew,N,W,B,Sy,Fel
144	England	57	Grey Friar	Cumbria	773	78	2,536	256	34D	89 90	NY260003	Sim,Hew,N,W,B,Sy,Fel
145	England	58	Sail	Cumbria	773	32	2,536	105	34B	89 90	NY198202	Sim,Hew,N,W,B,Sy,Fel
146	Ireland	47	Mullaghanattin	Kerry	773	514	2,536	1,686	50B	78	V738772	Ma,Sim,Hew,Dil,A,VL
147	Ireland	48	Barrclashcame	Mayo	772	706	2,533	2,316	47A	37	L849695	Ma,Sim,Hew,Dil,A,VL
148	England	59	Wandope	Cumbria	772	30	2,533	98	34B	89 90	NY188197	Sim,Hew,N,W,B,Sy,Fel
149	Ireland	49	Coomacarrea	Kerry	772	474	2,533	1,555	50A	78 83	V611825	Ma,Sim,Hew,Dil,A,VL
150	Wales	42	Drum	Conwy/ Gwynedd	771	48	2,530	159	30B	115	SH708695	Sim,Hew,N
151	Wales	43	Moelwyn Mawr	Gwynedd	770	385	2,526	1,263	30B	124	SH658448	Ma,Sim,Hew,N
152	England	60	Hopegill Head	Cumbria	770	97	2,526	318	34B	89 90	NY185221	Sim,Hew,N,sHu,W,B,Sy,Fel
153	Wales	44	Waun Rydd	Powys	769	170	2,524	558	32A	160	SO062206	Ma,Sim,Hew,N
154	Ireland	50	Knockmoylan	Tipperary	767	35	2,517	115	54A	74	S057093	Sim,Hew,Dil,A,VL
155	England	61	Meldon Hill	Cumbria	767	65	2,516	213	35A	91	NY771290	Sim,Hew,N
156	Ireland	51	Slieve Commedagh	Down	767	184	2,516	604	43B	29	J346286	Ma,Sim,Hew,Dil,A,VL
157	England	62	Great Rigg	Cumbria	766	31	2,513	102	34C	90	NY355104	Sim,Hew,N,W,B,Sy,Fel
158	Ireland	52	Croagh Patrick	Mayo	764	638	2,507	2,093	47A	30	L905802	Ma,Sim,Hew,Dil,A,VL
159	Ireland	53	Tievummera	Mayo	763	37	2,503	121	47A	37	L855694	Sim,Hew
160	England	63	Stony Cove Pike	Cumbria	763	171	2,503	561	34C	90	NY417100	Ma,Sim,Hew,N,W,B,Sy,Fel
161	England	64	Wetherlam	Cumbria	763	145	2,503	476	34D	89 90	NY288011	Hu,Sim,Hew,N,sMa,W,B,Sy,Fel
162	Ireland	54	Masatiompan	Kerry	763	108	2,503	354	49A	70	Q465145	Hu,Sim,Hew,Dil,A,VL
163	Wales	45	Gallt yr Ogof	Conwy	763	42	2,503	138	30B	115	SH685585	Sim,Hew,N
164	England	65	High Raise	Cumbria	762	283	2,500	928	34B	89 90	NY280095	Ma,Sim,Hew,N,W,B,Sy,Fel
165	Ireland	55	Shehy Mountain	Kerry	762	46	2,500	151	50C	78	V901857	Sim,Hew,Dil,A,VL
166	Wales	46	Fan Hir	Powys	760	43	2,493	140	32A	160	SN830209	Sim,Hew,N
167	Ireland	56	Slievemaan	Wicklow	759	55	2,490	180	55A	56	T017908	Sim,Hew,Dil,A,VL
168	Ireland	57	Camenabologue	Wicklow	758	136	2,487	446	55A	56	T023959	Hu,Sim,Hew,Dil,A,VL
169	England	66	Ill Bell	Cumbria	757	124	2,484	407	34C	90	NY436077	Hu,Sim,Hew,N,W,B,Sy,Fel
170	Ireland	58	Purple Mountain NE Top	Kerry	757	36	2,484	118	50C	78	V894858	Sim,Hew,Dil,A,VL
171	Ireland	59	Kippure	Dublin/ Wicklow	757	264	2,484	866	55B	56	O115154	Ma,Sim,Hew,Dil,A,VL,CoH,CoU
172	Wales	47	Drosgl	Gwynedd	757	37	2,483	120	30B	115	SH663679	Sim,Hew,N
173	Wales	48	Y Llethr	Gwynedd	756	561	2,480	1,841	30D	124	SH661257	Ma,Sim,Hew,N
174	England	67	Red Pike (Buttermere)	Cumbria	755	40	2,477	131	34B	89	NY160154	Sim,Hew,N,W,B,Sy,Fel
175	Ireland	60	Knockanaffrin	Waterford	755	289	2,477	948	54A	75	S285152	Ma,Sim,Hew,Dil,A,VL
176	England	68	Dale Head	Cumbria	753	397	2,470	1,302	34B	89 90	NY222153	Ma,Sim,Hew,N,W,B,Sy,Fel
177	Ireland	61	Beann	Kerry	752	166	2,467	545	50B	78	V725764	Ma,Sim,Hew,Dil,A,VL
178	Wales	49	Pumlumon Fawr	Ceredigion	752	526	2,467	1,726	31A	135	SN789869	Ma,Sim,Hew,N,CoH,CoU
179	Wales	50	Moel Llyfnant	Gwynedd	751	206	2,464	676	30D	124 125	SH808351	Ma,Sim,Hew,N
180	Ireland	62	Errigal	Donegal	751	685	2,464	2,247	45B	01	B928207	Ma,Sim,Hew,Dil,A,VL,CoH,CoU
181	Wales	51	Diffwys	Gwynedd	750	148	2,462	484	30D	124	SH661234	Hu,Sim,Hew,N,sMa
182	Wales	52	Bannau Sir Gaer	Carmarthenshire	749	93	2,458	306	32A	160	SN811218	Sim,Hew,N,sHu
183	England	69	Little Fell	Cumbria	748	73	2,454	240	35A	91	NY780222	Sim,Hew,N
184	Ireland	63	Piaras Mor	Kerry	748	34	2,454	112	49A	70	Q463136	Sim,Hew,A,VL
185	Wales	53	Yr Aran	Gwynedd	747	235	2,451	771	30B	115	SH604515	Ma,Sim,Hew,N
186	England	70	Burnhope Seat	Cumbria	747	190	2,451	623	35A	91	NY784375	Ma,Sim,Hew,N
187	Ireland	64	Cnoc Iochtair	Kerry	746	44	2,448	144	50C	78	V784859	Sim,Hew,Dil,A,VL
188	England	71	Carl Side	Cumbria	746	30	2,448	98	34A	89 90	NY254280	Sim,Hew,N,W,B,Sy,Fel
189	Ireland	65	Slieve Binnian	Down	746	349	2,447	1,145	43B	29	J320233	Ma,Sim,Hew,Dil,A,VL
190	England	72	Black Sails	Cumbria	745	37	2,444	121	34D	89 90	NY282007	Sim,Hew,N,B,Sy
191	Ireland	66	Broaghnabinnia	Kerry	745	299	2,444	981	50B	78	V801814	Ma,Sim,Hew,Dil,A,VL
192	England	73	High Crag (Buttermere)	Cumbria	744	35	2,441	115	34B	89 90	NY180139	Sim,Hew,N,W,B,Sy,Fel
193	Ireland	67	Tievnabinnia	Mayo	742	34	2,434	112	47A	37	L881706	Sim,Hew,Dil,A,VL
194	Ireland	68	Coumfea	Waterford	742	68	2,434	223	54A	75	S295097	Sim,Hew,Dil,A,VL
195	Wales	54	Pen Pumlumon Arwystli	Ceredigion	741	64	2,431	210	31A	135 136	SN814877	Sim,Hew,N
196	England	74	Hobcarton Crag	Cumbria	739	37	2,425	121	34B	89 90	NY193220	Sim,Hew,N,B,Sy
197	Ireland	69	Slieve Bearnagh	Down	739	304	2,425	997	43B	29	J313280	Ma,Sim,Hew,Dil,A,VL
198	England	75	Robinson	Cumbria	737	161	2,418	528	34B	89 90	NY201168	Ma,Sim,Hew,N,W,B,Sy,Fel
199	England	76	Seat Sandal	Cumbria	737	152	2,417	498	34C	90	NY344115	Ma,Sim,Hew,N,W,B,Sy,Fel
200	England	77	Whernside	Cumbria/ North Yorkshire	736	408	2,415	1,339	35B	98	SD738814	Ma,Sim,Hew,N,CoH,CoU,CoA
201	England	78	Harrison Stickle	Cumbria	736	53	2,415	174	34B	89 90	NY281074	Sim,Hew,N,W,B,Sy,Fel
202	Ireland	70	Tomies Mountain	Kerry	735	62	2,411	203	50C	78	V894867	Sim,Hew,Dil,A,VL
203	Ireland	71	Blackstairs Mountain	Carlow/ Wexford	735	540	2,411	1,772	54B	68	S810447	Ma,Sim,Hew,Dil,A,VL
204	Wales	55	Fan Fawr	Powys	734	295	2,408	968	32A	160	SN969193	Ma,Sim,Hew,N
205	Wales	56	Craig Cwm Silyn	Gwynedd	734	398	2,408	1,306	30B	115	SH525502	Ma,Sim,Hew,N
206	Wales	57	Rhobell Fawr	Gwynedd	734	309	2,408	1,014	30D	124	SH786256	Ma,Sim,Hew,N
207	England	79	Long Side	Cumbria	734	40	2,408	131	34A	89 90	NY248284	Sim,Hew,N,W,B,Sy,Fel
208	Ireland	72	Conavalla	Wicklow	734	108	2,408	354	55A	56	T039972	Hu,Sim,Hew,Dil,A,VL
209	Ireland	73	Cnoc an Bhraca	Kerry	731	96	2,398	315	50C	78	V858854	Sim,Hew,Dil,A,VL,sHu
210	England	80	Kentmere Pike	Cumbria	730	39	2,395	128	34C	90	NY465077	Sim,Hew,N,W,B,Sy,Fel
211	England	81	Hindscarth	Cumbria	727	71	2,385	233	34B	89 90	NY215165	Sim,Hew,N,W,B,Sy,Fel
212	Wales	58	Pen Pumlumon Llygad-bychan	Ceredigion	727	36	2,385	118	31A	135	SN798871	Sim,Hew,N
213	Wales	59	Moel Eilio	Gwynedd	726	259	2,382	850	30B	115	SH555577	Ma,Sim,Hew,N
214	England	82	Ullscarf	Cumbria	726	118	2,382	387	34B	89 90	NY291121	Hu,Sim,Hew,N,W,B,Sy,Fel
215	England	83	Clough Head	Cumbria	726	108	2,382	354	34C	90	NY333225	Hu,Sim,Hew,N,W,B,Sy,Fel
216	Ireland	74	Seefin	Waterford	726	70	2,382	230	54A	75	S274068	Sim,Hew,Dil,A,VL
217	Wales	60	Fan Gyhirych	Powys	725	280	2,379	919	32A	160	SN880191	Ma,Sim,Hew,N
218	Ireland	75	Djouce	Wicklow	725	203	2,379	666	55B	56	O178103	Ma,Sim,Hew,Dil,A,VL
219	Ireland	76	Binn Bhan	Galway	725	682	2,379	2,238	47B	37	L785539	Ma,Sim,Hew,Dil,A,VL,CoH,CoU
220	England	84	Ingleborough	North Yorkshire	724	427	2,375	1,401	35B	98	SD741745	Ma,Sim,Hew,N
221	Ireland	77	Seefingan	Dublin/ Wicklow	723	101	2,372	331	55B	56	O086169	Hu,Sim,Hew,Dil,A,VL
222	Ireland	78	Slieve Carr	Mayo	721	648	2,365	2,126	46B	23	F914144	Ma,Sim,Hew,Dil,A,VL
223	England	85	Red Beck Top	Cumbria	721	37	2,365	121	34B	89 90	NY242097	Sim,Hew,N,B,Sy
224	Ireland	79	Slievenamon	Tipperary	721	643	2,365	2,110	54B	67	S297307	Ma,Sim,Hew,Dil,A,VL
225	Wales	61	Pen Allt-mawr	Powys	720	102	2,362	335	32A	161	SO206243	Hu,Sim,Hew,N
226	Wales	62	Rhinog Fawr	Gwynedd	720	363	2,362	1,191	30D	124	SH656290	Ma,Sim,Hew,N
227	England	86	Froswick	Cumbria	720	75	2,362	246	34C	90	NY435085	Sim,Hew,N,W,B,Sy,Fel
228	Ireland	80	Duff Hill	Wicklow	720	65	2,362	213	55B	56	O093082	Sim,Hew,Dil,A,VL
229	England	87	Whiteside East Top	Cumbria	719	39	2,359	128	34B	89 90	NY175221	Sim,Hew,N,B,Sy
230	Ireland	81	Gravale	Wicklow	718	126	2,356	413	55B	56	O104094	Hu,Sim,Hew,Dil,A,VL
231	England	88	Great Shunner Fell	North Yorkshire	716	297	2,349	974	35A	98	SD848972	Ma,Sim,Hew,N
232	England	89	Brandreth	Cumbria	715	61	2,346	200	34B	89 90	NY214119	Sim,Hew,N,W,B,Sy,Fel
233	England	90	Lonscale Fell	Cumbria	715	50	2,346	164	34A	89 90	NY285271	Sim,Hew,N,W,B,Sy,Fel
234	Ireland	82	Meenteog	Kerry	715	112	2,346	367	50A	78 83	V638826	Hu,Sim,Hew,Dil,A,VL
235	England	91	Hedgehope Hill	Northumberland	714	147	2,344	483	33	80	NT943197	Hu,Sim,Hew,N,sMa
236	Ireland	83	Corranabinnia	Mayo	714	540	2,343	1,772	46B	30	F903031	Ma,Sim,Hew,Dil,A,VL
237	England	92	Branstree	Cumbria	713	137	2,339	449	34C	90	NY478099	Hu,Sim,Hew,N,W,B,Sy,Fel
238	Wales	63	Rhinog Fach	Gwynedd	712	148	2,336	486	30D	124	SH664270	Hu,Sim,Hew,N,sMa
239	Ireland	84	Binn Chorr	Galway	711	304	2,333	997	47B	37	L811522	Ma,Sim,Hew,Dil,A,VL
240	Wales	64	Moelwyn Bach	Gwynedd	710	124	2,329	407	30B	124	SH660437	Hu,Sim,Hew,N
241	England	93	Dead Stones	Cumbria/ Durham	710	33	2,329	108	35A	91	NY793399	Sim,Hew,N
242	England	94	Knott	Cumbria	710	242	2,329	794	34A	89 90	NY296329	Ma,Sim,Hew,N,W,B,Sy,Fel
243	Wales	65	Trum y Ddysgl	Gwynedd	709	204	2,326	669	30B	115	SH544516	Ma,Sim,Hew,N
244	England	95	High Seat	Cumbria/ North Yorkshire	709	112	2,326	367	35A	91 92	NY802012	Hu,Sim,Hew,N
245	England	96	Pike of Stickle	Cumbria	709	54	2,326	177	34B	89 90	NY273073	Sim,Hew,N,W,B,Sy,Fel
246	England	97	Melmerby Fell	Cumbria	709	43	2,326	141	35A	91	NY652380	Sim,Hew,N
247	England	98	Great Stony Hill	Durham	708	54	2,323	177	35A	91 92	NY823359	Sim,Hew,N
248	England	99	Wild Boar Fell	Cumbria	708	344	2,323	1,129	35A	98	SD758987	Ma,Sim,Hew,N
249	England	100	Yoke	Cumbria	706	38	2,316	125	34C	90	NY437067	Sim,Hew,N,W,B,Sy,Fel
250	Ireland	85	Knockboy	Cork/ County Kerry	706	610	2,316	2,001	52A	85	W004620	Ma,Sim,Hew,Dil,A,VL,CoH,CoU
251	England	101	Pike of Blisco	Cumbria	705	177	2,313	581	34B	89 90	NY271042	Ma,Sim,Hew,N,W,B,Sy,Fel
252	Ireland	86	Stoompa	Kerry	705	88	2,313	289	52A	79	W006818	Sim,Hew,Dil,A,VL
253	England	102	Great Whernside	North Yorkshire	704	288	2,310	945	35B	98	SE002739	Ma,Sim,Hew,N
254	Wales	66	Black Mountain	Herefordshire/Powys	703	154	2,306	505	32A	161	SO255350	Ma,Sim,Hew,N,CoH,CoU,CoA
255	England	103	Chapelfell Top	Durham	703	142	2,306	466	35A	91 92	NY875347	Hu,Sim,Hew,N,sMa
256	Ireland	87	Moanbane	Wicklow	703	104	2,306	341	55B	56	O033068	Hu,Sim,Hew,Dil,A,VL
257	Ireland	88	Slievelamagan	Down	702	196	2,304	643	43B	29	J328260	Ma,Sim,Hew,Dil,A,VL
258	England	104	Buckden Pike	North Yorkshire	702	207	2,303	679	35B	98	SD960787	Ma,Sim,Hew,N
259	England	105	Bowscale Fell	Cumbria	702	87	2,303	285	34A	90	NY333305	Sim,Hew,N,W,B,Sy,Fel
260	Ireland	89	Binn idir an Da Log	Galway	702	629	2,303	2,064	47C	37	L888528	Ma,Sim,Hew,Dil,A,VL
261	Ireland	90	Slieve Meelbeg	Down	702	184	2,303	604	43B	29	J300279	Ma,Sim,Hew,Dil,A,VL
262	Wales	67	Pen Cerrig-calch	Powys	701	52	2,300	171	32A	161	SO216224	Sim,Hew,N
263	England	106	Cold Pike	Cumbria	701	46	2,300	151	34B	89 90	NY262036	Sim,Hew,N,W,B,Sy,Fel
264	Ireland	91	Ben Gorm	Mayo	700	612	2,297	2,008	47A	37	L861652	Ma,Sim,Hew,Dil,A,VL
265	Ireland	92	Camaderry Mountain	Wicklow	699	72	2,292	236	55A	56	T081980	Sim,Hew,Dil,A,VL
266	Ireland	93	Birreencorragh	Mayo	698	583	2,290	1,913	46B	23 31	G024050	Ma,Sim,Hew,Dil,A,VL
267	Wales	68	Mynydd Mawr	Gwynedd	698	463	2,290	1,519	30B	115	SH539546	Ma,Sim,Hew,N
268	Wales	69	Allt-Fawr	Gwynedd	698	243	2,290	797	30B	115	SH681474	Ma,Sim,Hew,N
269	Ireland	94	Silsean	Wicklow	698	46	2,290	151	55B	56	O023056	Sim,Hew,Dil,A,VL
270	England	107	Rest Dodd	Cumbria	696	111	2,283	364	34C	90	NY432136	Hu,Sim,Hew,N,W,B,Sy,Fel
271	Ireland	95	Binn Dubh	Galway	696	202	2,283	663	47B	37	L797529	Ma,Sim,Hew,Dil,A,VL
272	Wales	70	Mynydd Drws-y-coed	Gwynedd	695	57	2,280	187	30B	115	SH548518	Sim,Hew,N
273	England	108	Pen-y-ghent	North Yorkshire	694	306	2,277	1,004	35B	98	SD838733	Ma,Sim,Hew,N
274	Ireland	96	Keeper Hill	Tipperary	694	607	2,277	1,991	53B	59	R823667	Ma,Sim,Hew,Dil,A,VL
275	Ireland	97	The Paps East	Kerry	694	402	2,277	1,319	48C	79	W133855	Ma,Sim,Hew,Dil,A,VL
276	Ireland	98	Ben Creggan	Mayo	693	88	2,274	289	47A	37	L857666	Sim,Hew,Dil,A,VL
277	England	109	Seatallan	Cumbria	692	193	2,270	633	34B	89	NY140084	Ma,Sim,Hew,N,W,B,Sy,Fel
278	Ireland	99	Beann NE Top	Kerry	692	33	2,270	108	50B	78	V730771	Sim,Hew,Dil,A,VL
279	Ireland	100	Caoinkeen	Cork/ County Kerry	692	106	2,270	348	52A	85	W010645	Hu,Sim,Hew,Dil,A,VL
280	Ireland	101	Knockaterriff	Limerick	692	51	2,269	168	53A	74	R848216	Sim,Hew,Dil,A,VL
281	Ireland	102	Binn Bhraoin	Galway	691	234	2,267	768	47B	37	L783515	Ma,Sim,Hew,Dil,A,VL
282	Wales	71	Foel Wen	Powys/ Wrexham	691	59	2,266	193	30E	125	SJ099334	Sim,Hew,N
283	Wales	72	Twmpa	Powys	690	79	2,264	259	32A	161	SO224350	Sim,Hew,N
284	England	110	Great Calva	Cumbria	690	142	2,264	466	34A	89 90	NY290311	Hu,Sim,Hew,N,sMa,W,B,Sy,Fel
285	Ireland	103	Knocknadobar	Kerry	690	565	2,264	1,854	50A	83	V506845	Ma,Sim,Hew,Dil,A,VL
286	Ireland	104	The Paps West	Kerry	690	106	2,264	348	48C	79	W125855	Hu,Sim,Hew,Dil,A,VL
287	Wales	73	Arenig Fach	Gwynedd	689	294	2,260	965	30D	124 125	SH820415	Ma,Sim,Hew,N
288	Wales	74	Cnicht	Gwynedd	689	104	2,260	341	30B	115	SH645466	Hu,Sim,Hew,N
289	Wales	75	Foel Hafod-fynydd	Gwynedd	689	84	2,260	276	30E	124 125	SH877227	Sim,Hew,N
290	Ireland	105	Croaghaun	Mayo	688	688	2,257	2,257	46C	22 30	F559060	Ma,Sim,Hew,Dil,A,VL
291	Ireland	106	Ben Creggan South Top	Mayo	687	72	2,254	236	47A	37	L858661	Sim,Hew,Dil,A,VL
292	England	111	Great Coum	Cumbria	687	221	2,254	725	35B	98	SD700835	Ma,Sim,Hew,N
293	Ireland	107	Slieve Meelmore	Down	687	97	2,254	318	43B	29	J306287	Sim,Hew,Dil,A,VL,sHu
294	England	112	Round Hill	Cumbria	686	71	2,251	233	35A	91	NY744361	Sim,Hew,N
295	Ireland	108	War Hill	Wicklow	686	69	2,251	226	55B	56	O169113	Sim,Hew,Dil,A,VL
296	Wales	76	Gwaun y Llwyni	Gwynedd	685	43	2,247	141	30E	124 125	SH857204	Sim,Hew,N
297	Ireland	109	Hungry Hill	Cork	685	400	2,247	1,312	51A	84	V760497	Ma,Sim,Hew,Dil,A,VL
298	Wales	77	Pen y Brynfforchog	Gwynedd	685	71	2,247	233	30E	124 125	SH817179	Sim,Hew,N
299	Ireland	110	Knockmoyle	Kerry	684	168	2,244	551	50B	78 83	V665749	Ma,Sim,Hew,Dil,A,VL
300	Wales	78	Y Garn	Ceredigion	684	56	2,244	184	31A	135	SN775851	Sim,Hew,N
301	England	113	Bannerdale Crags	Cumbria	683	37	2,241	121	34A	90	NY335290	Sim,Hew,N,W,B,Sy,Fel
302	Ireland	111	Tomaneena	Wicklow	682	49	2,239	161	55A	56	T062982	Sim,Hew,Dil,A,VL
303	Ireland	112	Maumtrasna	Mayo	682	608	2,238	1,995	47C	38	L961637	Ma,Sim,Hew,Dil,A,VL
304	Ireland	113	Carrigvore	Wicklow	682	71	2,238	233	55B	56	O122101	Sim,Hew,Dil,A,VL
305	Ireland	114	Corranabinnia SW Top	Mayo	681	58	2,234	190	46B	30	F897026	Sim,Hew,Dil,A,VL
306	England	114	Swarth Fell	Cumbria	681	76	2,234	249	35A	98	SD755966	Sim,Hew,N
307	Ireland	115	Caherbarnagh	Cork	681	364	2,234	1,194	48C	79	W191871	Ma,Sim,Hew,Dil,A,VL
308	England	115	Plover Hill	North Yorkshire	680	59	2,231	194	35B	98	SD849752	Sim,Hew,N
309	Wales	79	Mynydd Tarw	Powys/ Wrexham	679	44	2,229	145	30E	125	SJ112324	Sim,Hew,N
310	Wales	80	Chwarel y Fan	Monmouthshire	679	72	2,228	236	32A	161	SO258294	Sim,Hew,N,CoH,CoU,CoA
311	Ireland	116	Colly	Kerry	679	146	2,228	479	50A	78 83	V650807	Hu,Sim,Hew,Dil,A,VL,sMa
312	Wales	81	Maesglase	Gwynedd	679	318	2,226	1,044	30F	124 125	SH817150	Ma,Sim,Hew,N
313	England	116	Baugh Fell	Cumbria	678	265	2,224	869	35A	98	SD740916	Ma,Sim,Hew,N
314	Ireland	117	Knocksheegowna	Waterford	678	52	2,224	171	54A	75	S277165	Sim,Hew,Dil,A,VL
315	Ireland	118	Sawel	Londonderry	678	580	2,224	1,903	44B	13	H617973	Ma,Sim,Hew,Dil,A,VL,CoH,CoU
316	Ireland	119	Slieve Binnian North Top	Down	678	50	2,224	164	43B	29	J317244	Sim,Hew,Dil,A,VL
317	Ireland	120	Slieve Snaght	Donegal	678	400	2,224	1,312	45B	01	B923148	Ma,Sim,Hew,Dil,A,VL
318	Wales	82	Creigiau Gleision	Conwy	678	262	2,224	860	30B	115	SH728615	Ma,Sim,Hew,N
319	Wales	83	Moel Druman	Gwynedd	676	61	2,218	200	30B	115	SH671476	Sim,Hew,N
320	England	117	The Calf	Cumbria	676	383	2,218	1,257	35A	98	SD667970	Ma,Sim,Hew,N
321	Ireland	121	Knocknagantee	Kerry	676	102	2,218	335	50B	78 83	V667729	Hu,Sim,Hew,Dil,A,VL
322	England	118	Calders	Cumbria	675	34	2,216	112	35A	98	SD670960	Sim,Hew,N
323	England	119	Westernhope Moor	Durham	675	67	2,215	220	35A	91 92	NY923325	Sim,Hew,N
324	England	120	Sheffield Pike	Cumbria	675	91	2,215	299	34C	90	NY369181	Sim,Hew,N,sHu,W,B,Sy,Fel
325	England	121	Murton Fell	Cumbria	675	74	2,215	243	35A	91	NY753246	Sim,Hew,N
326	England	122	Lovely Seat	North Yorkshire	675	149	2,214	489	35A	98	SD879950	Hu,Sim,Hew,N,sMa
327	Ireland	122	An Bheann Mhor	Kerry	675	290	2,214	951	50B	83 84	V593683	Ma,Sim,Hew,Dil,A,VL
328	Wales	84	Moel Cynghorion	Gwynedd	674	176	2,211	577	30B	115	SH586563	Ma,Sim,Hew,N
329	Ireland	123	Croaghgorm	Donegal	674	522	2,211	1,713	45C	11	G948895	Ma,Sim,Hew,Dil,A,VL
330	England	123	Killhope Law	Durham/ Northumberland	673	48	2,208	157	35A	86 87	NY819448	Sim,Hew,N
331	Ireland	124	Binn Doire Chlair	Galway	673	122	2,208	400	47B	37	L815510	Hu,Sim,Hew,Dil,A,VL
332	England	124	Rogan's Seat	North Yorkshire	672	195	2,205	640	35A	91 92	NY919030	Ma,Sim,Hew,N
333	England	125	Great Knoutberry Hill	Cumbria/ North Yorkshire	672	254	2,205	833	35B	98	SD788871	Ma,Sim,Hew,N
334	England	126	Scar Crags	Cumbria	672	55	2,205	180	34B	89 90	NY208206	Sim,Hew,N,W,B,Sy,Fel
335	England	127	Loadpot Hill	Cumbria	672	49	2,205	161	34C	90	NY456180	Sim,Hew,N,W,B,Sy,Fel
336	Wales	85	Ysgafell Wen	Conwy	672	57	2,205	187	30B	115	SH666481	Sim,Hew,N
337	Ireland	125	Slievemore	Mayo	671	582	2,201	1,909	46C	22 30	F650086	Ma,Sim,Hew,Dil,A,VL
338	Wales	86	Esgeiriau Gwynion	Gwynedd	671	166	2,201	545	30E	124 125	SH889236	Ma,Sim,Hew,N
339	Ireland	126	Lavagh More	Donegal	671	193	2,201	633	45C	11	G935910	Ma,Sim,Hew,Dil,A,VL
340	Ireland	127	Slieve Muck	Down	670	156	2,199	512	43B	29	J281249	Ma,Sim,Hew,Dil,A,VL
341	Wales	87	Waun-oer	Gwynedd	670	120	2,198	394	30F	124	SH785147	Hu,Sim,Hew,N
342	Ireland	128	Slievanea NE Top	Kerry	670	273	2,198	896	49B	70	Q515063	Ma,Sim,Hew,Dil,A,VL
343	Wales	88	Ysgafell Wen North Top	Gwynedd	669	33	2,195	108	30B	115	SH663485	Sim,Hew,N
344	Wales	89	Carnedd y Filiast	Conwy/ Gwynedd	669	316	2,195	1,037	30D	124 125	SH871445	Ma,Sim,Hew,N
345	England	128	Fountains Fell	North Yorkshire	668	243	2,192	797	35B	98	SD864715	Ma,Sim,Hew,N
346	England	129	Dodd Fell Hill	North Yorkshire	668	232	2,192	761	35B	98	SD841845	Ma,Sim,Hew,N
347	Ireland	129	Knocknafallia	Waterford	668	152	2,192	499	54A	74	S090075	Ma,Sim,Hew,A,VL
348	Ireland	130	Muckish	Donegal	667	481	2,189	1,578	45B	02	C004287	Ma,Sim,Hew,Dil,A,VL
349	Wales	90	Foel Cedig	Gwynedd	667	180	2,188	587	30E	125	SH988279	Ma,Sim,Hew,N
350	England	130	Little Fell	North Yorkshire	667	49	2,188	161	35A	98	SD808971	Sim,Hew,N
351	Wales	91	Tarren y Gesail	Gwynedd	667	463	2,188	1,519	30F	124	SH710058	Ma,Sim,Hew,N
352	Ireland	131	An Corran	Kerry	667	142	2,188	466	50B	78	V696737	Hu,Sim,Hew,Dil,A,VL,sMa
353	Ireland	132	Beenmore	Kerry	667	132	2,188	433	50A	83	V596867	Hu,Sim,Hew,Dil,A,VL
354	Ireland	133	Binn Bhriocain	Galway	667	320	2,188	1,050	47C	37	L855551	Ma,Sim,Hew,Dil,A,VL
355	Ireland	134	Coomura Mountain	Kerry	666	110	2,185	361	50B	78 83	V677751	Hu,Sim,Hew,Dil,A,VL
356	Ireland	135	Cuilcagh	Cavan/ Fermanagh	666	605	2,185	1,985	45D	26	H123280	Ma,Sim,Hew,Dil,A,VL,CoH,CoU
357	Wales	92	Post Gwyn	Powys	665	60	2,182	197	30E	125	SJ047293	Sim,Hew,N
358	Ireland	136	Mullaghnarakill	Kerry	665	90	2,182	295	50A	78 83	V600850	Sim,Hew,Dil,A,VL,sHu
359	Ireland	137	Croaghaun SW Top	Mayo	664	40	2,178	131	46C	22 30	F553058	Sim,Hew,A,VL
360	England	131	Tarn Crag (Sleddale)	Cumbria	664	160	2,178	525	34C	90	NY488078	Ma,Sim,Hew,N,W,B,Sy,Fel
361	England	132	Black Fell	Cumbria	664	89	2,178	292	35A	86	NY648444	Sim,Hew,N
362	Ireland	138	Croaghanmoira	Wicklow	664	209	2,178	686	55A	62	T099865	Ma,Sim,Hew,Dil,A,VL
363	Ireland	139	Binn Gabhar	Galway	664	194	2,178	636	47B	37	L783506	Ma,Sim,Hew,Dil,A,VL
364	Wales	93	Fan Nedd	Powys	663	174	2,175	571	32A	160	SN913184	Ma,Sim,Hew,N
365	Wales	94	Mynydd Llysiau	Powys	663	40	2,175	131	32A	161	SO207279	Sim,Hew,N
366	England	133	Carrock Fell	Cumbria	663	91	2,175	299	34A	90	NY341336	Sim,Hew,N,sHu,W,B,Sy,Fel
367	Ireland	140	Camenabologue SE Top	Wicklow	663	38	2,175	125	55A	56	T036953	Sim,Hew,Dil,A,VL
368	Ireland	141	Stumpa Duloigh SW Top	Kerry	663	60	2,175	197	50B	78	V778789	Sim,Hew,Dil,A,VL
369	Ireland	142	Sugarloaf Hill	Tipperary/ Waterford	663	118	2,174	387	54A	74	S039104	Hu,Sim,Hew,Dil,A,VL
370	Wales	95	Dduallt	Gwynedd	662	138	2,172	453	30D	124 125	SH810273	Hu,Sim,Hew,N
371	England	134	Nine Standards Rigg	Cumbria	662	157	2,172	515	35A	91 92	NY825060	Ma,Sim,Hew,N
372	Wales	96	Manod Mawr	Gwynedd	661	266	2,169	873	30D	124	SH724446	Ma,Sim,Hew,N
373	Wales	97	Craig-las	Gwynedd	661	103	2,169	338	30F	124	SH677135	Hu,Sim,Hew,N
374	Ireland	143	Binn Mhor	Galway	661	408	2,169	1,339	47C	44	L918493	Ma,Sim,Hew,Dil,A,VL
375	Wales	98	Great Rhos	Powys	660	379	2,165	1,243	31B	148	SO182638	Ma,Sim,Hew,N,CoH
376	England	135	Whiteless Pike	Cumbria	660	36	2,165	118	34B	89 90	NY180189	Sim,Hew,N,W,B,Sy,Fel
377	Ireland	144	Binn idir an Da Log SE Top	Galway	659	35	2,162	115	47C	37	L893525	Sim,Hew,A,VL
378	Wales	99	Cribin Fawr	Gwynedd	659	93	2,161	305	30F	124	SH794152	Sim,Hew,N,sHu
379	Wales	100	Manod Mawr North Top	Gwynedd	658	65	2,159	213	30D	115	SH727458	Sim,Hew,N
380	England	136	High Pike (Caldbeck)	Cumbria	658	69	2,159	226	34A	90	NY318350	Sim,Hew,N,W,B,Sy,Fel
381	Ireland	145	Knockowen	Cork/ County Kerry	658	330	2,159	1,083	51A	84	V808553	Ma,Sim,Hew,Dil,A,VL
382	England	137	Place Fell	Cumbria	657	262	2,156	860	34C	90	NY405169	Ma,Sim,Hew,N,W,B,Sy,Fel
383	Ireland	146	Mullacor	Wicklow	657	102	2,156	335	55A	56	T092939	Hu,Sim,Hew,Dil,A,VL
384	Ireland	147	Beann SW Top	Kerry	657	72	2,156	236	50B	78	V718760	Sim,Hew,Dil,A,VL
385	Ireland	148	Mount Leinster East Top	Wexrford	657	32	2,154	106	54B	68	S844527	Sim,Hew,A,VL
386	England	138	Grey Nag	Northumberland	656	40	2,152	131	35A	86	NY664476	Sim,Hew,N
387	Ireland	149	Crohane	Kerry	656	388	2,152	1,273	52A	79	W049829	Ma,Sim,Hew,Dil,A,VL
388	Ireland	150	Dromderalough	Kerry	656	54	2,152	177	52A	78	V960790	Sim,Hew,Dil,A,VL
389	Ireland	151	Chimney Rock Mountain	Down	656	130	2,152	427	43B	29	J364257	Hu,Sim,Hew,Dil,A,VL
390	Ireland	152	Knocknagnauv	Tipperary/ Waterford	655	62	2,149	203	54A	74	S081083	Sim,Hew,Dil,A,VL
391	Wales	101	Moel yr Ogof	Gwynedd	655	118	2,149	387	30B	115	SH556478	Hu,Sim,Hew,N
392	England	139	Selside Pike	Cumbria	655	36	2,149	118	34C	90	NY490111	Sim,Hew,N,W,B,Sy,Fel
393	Ireland	153	Cnoc na dTarbh	Kerry	655	58	2,149	190	50C	78	V862849	Sim,Hew,Dil,A,VL
394	Ireland	154	Cove Mountain	Down	655	102	2,148	335	43B	29	J336270	Hu,Sim,Hew,Dil,A,VL
395	England	140	Harter Fell (Eskdale)	Cumbria	654	276	2,146	906	34D	96	SD218997	Ma,Sim,Hew,N,W,B,Sy,Fel
396	Ireland	155	Muckanaght	Galway	654	179	2,146	587	47B	37	L767540	Ma,Sim,Hew,Dil,A,VL
397	England	141	High Spy	Cumbria	653	148	2,143	485	34B	89 90	NY234162	Hu,Sim,Hew,N,sMa,W,B,Sy,Fel
398	Wales	102	Mynydd Tal-y-mignedd	Gwynedd	653	51	2,142	167	30B	115	SH535513	Sim,Hew,N
399	Ireland	156	Keadeen Mountain	Wicklow	653	335	2,142	1,099	55A	62	S953897	Ma,Sim,Hew,Dil,A,VL
400	England	142	Comb Fell	Northumberland	653	70	2,141	230	33	80	NT924187	Sim,Hew,N
401	Ireland	157	Lugduff	Wicklow	652	93	2,139	305	55A	56	T072953	Sim,Hew,Dil,A,VL,sHu
402	Ireland	158	Knockshanahullion	Tipperary	652	316	2,139	1,037	54A	74	R999104	Ma,Sim,Hew,Dil,A,VL
403	Ireland	159	Dooish	Donegal	652	319	2,137	1,047	45B	06	B982210	Ma,Sim,Hew,Dil,A,VL
404	England	143	Three Pikes	Durham	651	30	2,136	98	35A	91 92	NY835343	Sim,Hew,N
405	England	144	Rossett Pike	Cumbria	651	40	2,136	131	34B	89 90	NY249075	Sim,Hew,N,W,B,Sy,Fel
406	Ireland	160	Been Hill	Kerry	651	46	2,136	151	50A	83	V590854	Sim,Hew,Dil,A,VL
407	Wales	103	Black Mixen	Powys	650	45	2,133	148	31B	148	SO196643	Sim,Hew,N
408	England	145	Simon Fell	North Yorkshire	650	35	2,133	115	35B	98	SD754751	Sim,Hew,N
409	Ireland	161	Lavagh Beg	Donegal	650	90	2,133	295	45C	11	G926915	Sim,Hew,Dil,A,VL,sHu
410	England	146	Viewing Hill	Durham	649	66	2,129	217	35A	91	NY789331	Sim,Hew,N
411	Ireland	162	An Cnapan Mor	Kerry	649	81	2,129	266	49B	70	Q522045	Sim,Hew,Dil,A,VL
412	Ireland	163	Mullaghanish	Cork/ County Kerry	649	264	2,129	866	48C	79	W214817	Ma,Sim,Hew,Dil,A,VL
413	England	147	Fleetwith Pike	Cumbria	649	118	2,129	388	34B	89 90	NY205141	Hu,Sim,Hew,N,W,B,Sy,Fel
414	Ireland	164	Coomcallee	Kerry	649	101	2,129	331	50B	83 84	V623677	Hu,Sim,Hew,Dil,A,VL
415	Wales	104	Moel-yr-hydd	Gwynedd	648	82	2,126	269	30B	115	SH672454	Sim,Hew,N
416	Wales	105	Foel Cwm-Sian Llwyd	Gwynedd	648	57	2,126	187	30E	125	SH995313	Sim,Hew,N
417	Ireland	165	Seahan	Dublin	647	94	2,124	308	55B	56	O081196	Sim,Hew,Dil,A,VL,sHu
418	Ireland	166	Truskmore	Sligo	647	560	2,123	1,837	45D	16	G759473	Ma,Sim,Hew,Dil,A,VL,CoH,CoU
419	Wales	106	Pen y Boncyn Trefeilw	Gwynedd	646	57	2,119	187	30E	125	SH962283	Sim,Hew,N
420	England	148	Base Brown	Cumbria	646	38	2,119	125	34B	89 90	NY225114	Sim,Hew,N,W,B,Sy,Fel
421	Wales	107	Drygarn Fawr	Powys	645	257	2,116	843	31C	147	SN862584	Ma,Sim,Hew,N
422	Ireland	167	Devilsmother	Galway	645	280	2,116	919	47C	37	L915624	Ma,Sim,Hew,Dil,A,VL
423	Ireland	168	Tonduff	Wicklow	644	118	2,113	387	55B	56	O159136	Hu,Sim,Hew,Dil,A,VL
424	Ireland	169	Coomnadiha	Kerry	644	208	2,113	682	51A	85	V847600	Ma,Sim,Hew,Dil,A,VL
425	England	149	Yockenthwaite Moor	North Yorkshire	643	86	2,110	282	35B	98	SD909810	Sim,Hew,N
426	Ireland	170	Musheramore	Cork	643	437	2,109	1,434	48C	79	W328849	Ma,Sim,Hew,Dil,A,VL
427	Ireland	171	Ardnageer	Donegal	642	80	2,106	262	45C	11	G969908	Sim,Hew,Dil,A,VL
428	Ireland	172	Cush	Tipperary	641	176	2,104	577	53A	74	R894262	Ma,Sim,Hew,Dil,A,VL
429	Ireland	173	Scarr	Wicklow	641	232	2,103	761	55B	56	O132018	Ma,Sim,Hew,Dil,A,VL
430	Ireland	174	Knocklomena	Kerry	641	379	2,103	1,243	50B	78	V797765	Ma,Sim,Hew,Dil,A,VL
431	Ireland	175	Cnoc na Banoige	Kerry	641	178	2,103	584	49B	70	Q548048	Ma,Sim,Hew,Dil,A,VL
432	Ireland	176	Croaghbane	Donegal	641	78	2,103	256	45C	11	G978910	Sim,Hew,Dil,A,VL
433	England	150	Iron Crag	Cumbria	640	54	2,100	177	34B	89	NY123119	Sim,Hew,N,B,Sy,Fel
434	Ireland	177	Drung Hill	Kerry	640	44	2,100	144	50A	78 83	V602878	Sim,Hew,Dil,A,VL
435	England	151	Fell Head	Cumbria	640	86	2,099	282	35A	97	SD649981	Sim,Hew,N
436	England	152	Yarlside	Cumbria	639	208	2,096	682	35A	98	SD685985	Ma,Sim,Hew,N
437	Ireland	178	Cnoc na gCapall	Kerry	639	330	2,096	1,083	50B	78	V834767	Ma,Sim,Hew,Dil,A,VL
438	Ireland	179	Beann South Top	Kerry	639	62	2,096	203	50B	78	V728755	Sim,Hew,Dil,A,VL
439	Wales	108	Moel Lefn	Gwynedd	638	62	2,093	203	30B	115	SH552485	Sim,Hew,N
440	England	153	Grey Crag	Cumbria	638	41	2,093	135	34C	90	NY497072	Sim,Hew,N,W,B,Sy,Fel
441	Ireland	180	Binn Fraoigh	Galway	638	55	2,093	180	47B	37	L777544	Sim,Hew,Dil,A,VL
442	Ireland	181	Eagle Mountain	Down	638	264	2,093	866	43B	29	J244229	Ma,Sim,Hew,Dil,A,VL
443	England	154	Causey Pike	Cumbria	637	40	2,090	131	34B	89 90	NY218208	Sim,Hew,N,W,B,Sy,Fel
444	England	155	Little Hart Crag	Cumbria	637	34	2,090	112	34C	90	NY387100	Sim,Hew,N,W,B,Sy,Fel
445	Ireland	182	Knocknamanagh	Kerry	637	180	2,090	591	52A	85	V990661	Ma,Sim,Hew,Dil,A,VL
446	England	156	Kinder Scout	Derbyshire	636	497	2,088	1,629	36	110	SK084875	Ma,Sim,Hew,N,CoH,CoU,CoA
447	Ireland	183	Lobawn	Wicklow	636	110	2,087	361	55A	56	S978977	Hu,Sim,Hew,Dil,A,VL
448	Ireland	184	Coomnacronia	Kerry	636	68	2,087	223	50B	78	V679733	Sim,Hew,Dil,A,VL
449	Ireland	185	Mullaghclogha	Londonderry	635	202	2,083	663	44B	13	H557957	Ma,Sim,Hew,Dil,A,VL
450	Wales	109	Garreg Las	Carmarthenshire	635	92	2,083	302	32A	160	SN777203	Sim,Hew,N,sHu
451	Wales	110	Tarrenhendre	Gwynedd	634	203	2,080	666	30F	135	SH682041	Ma,Sim,Hew,N
452	Wales	111	Creigiau Gleision North Top	Conwy	634	36	2,080	118	30B	115	SH733622	Sim,Hew,N
453	England	157	Bleaklow Head	Derbyshire	633	128	2,077	420	36	110	SK094960	Hu,Sim,Hew,N
454	England	158	Starling Dodd	Cumbria	633	73	2,077	240	34B	89	NY142157	Sim,Hew,N,W,B,Sy,Fel
455	Ireland	186	Kells Mountain	Kerry	633	140	2,077	459	50A	83	V528858	Hu,Sim,Hew,Dil,A,VL,sMa
456	Ireland	187	Binn Chaonaigh	Galway	633	110	2,077	361	47C	37	L900515	Hu,Sim,Hew,Dil,A,VL
457	Wales	112	Fan Llia	Powys	632	99	2,073	325	32A	160	SN938186	Sim,Hew,N,sHu
458	England	159	Dovenest Top	Cumbria	632	38	2,073	125	34B	89 90	NY255113	Sim,Hew,N,B,Sy
459	England	160	Seathwaite Fell	Cumbria	632	31	2,073	102	34B	89 90	NY227097	Sim,Hew,N,B,Sy
460	Ireland	188	An Chailleach	Galway	632	155	2,073	509	47B	37	L755537	Ma,Sim,Hew,Dil,A,VL
461	Ireland	189	Laghtshanaquilla	Tipperary	631	36	2,070	118	53A	74	R951250	Sim,Hew,Dil,A,VL
462	Ireland	190	Boughil	Kerry	631	93	2,070	305	50B	78	V842765	Sim,Hew,Dil,A,VL,sHu
463	Wales	113	Pen yr Allt Uchaf	Gwynedd	630	60	2,067	197	30E	124 125	SH870196	Sim,Hew,N
464	Ireland	191	Monabrack	Limerick	630	97	2,067	318	53A	74	R859218	Sim,Hew,Dil,A,VL,sHu
465	Wales	114	Moel Fferna	Denbighshire	630	105	2,067	344	30E	125	SJ116397	Hu,Sim,Hew,N
466	Wales	115	Fan Frynych	Powys	629	74	2,064	243	32A	160	SN957227	Sim,Hew,N
467	Wales	116	Craig Cerrig-gleisiad	Powys	629	46	2,064	151	32A	160	SN960218	Sim,Hew,N
468	Wales	117	Y Garn	Gwynedd	629	315	2,064	1,033	30D	124	SH702230	Ma,Sim,Hew,N
469	Wales	118	Foel Gron	Gwynedd	629	31	2,064	101	30B	115	SH560568	Sim,Hew,N
470	Ireland	192	Knocknalougha	Tipperary/ Waterford	629	85	2,064	279	54A	74	S019100	Sim,Hew,Dil,A,VL
471	Wales	119	Moel Penamnen	Gwynedd	628	138	2,061	453	30D	115	SH716483	Hu,Sim,Hew,N
472	Ireland	193	Glennamong	Mayo	628	139	2,060	456	46B	23 30	F912058	Hu,Sim,Hew,Dil,A,VL
473	England	161	Gragareth	Lancashire	628	33	2,060	108	35B	98	SD688793	Sim,Hew,N,CoU,CoA
474	England	162	Rough Crag (Riggindale)	Cumbria	628	33	2,060	108	34C	90	NY454112	Sim,Hew,N,B,Sy
475	Ireland	194	Nephin Beg	Mayo	627	364	2,057	1,194	46B	23	F931102	Ma,Sim,Hew,Dil,A,VL
476	Ireland	195	Mullaghaneany	Londonderry/ Tyrone	627	302	2,057	991	44B	13	H685986	Ma,Sim,Hew,Dil,A,VL,CoU
477	England	163	Yewbarrow	Cumbria	627	142	2,057	466	34B	89 90	NY173084	Hu,Sim,Hew,N,sMa,W,B,Sy,Fel
478	Ireland	196	Shanlieve	Down	627	33	2,057	108	43B	29	J240226	Sim,Hew,Dil,A,VL
479	Wales	120	Foel y Geifr	Gwynedd	626	110	2,054	361	30E	125	SH937275	Hu,Sim,Hew,N
480	Wales	121	Moel y Cerrig Duon	Gwynedd/Powys	625	80	2,051	262	30E	125	SH923241	Sim,Hew,N
481	Ireland	197	Meenard Mountain	Londonderry/ Tyrone	625	90	2,051	295	44B	13	H672985	Sim,Hew,Dil,A,VL,sHu
482	Ireland	198	Knocknamanagh NE Top	Kerry	625	58	2,051	190	52A	85	W001672	Sim,Hew,Dil,A,VL
483	England	164	Darnbrook Fell	North Yorkshire	624	40	2,047	131	35B	98	SD884727	Sim,Hew,N
484	England	165	Randygill Top	Cumbria	624	131	2,047	430	35A	91	NY687000	Hu,Sim,Hew,N
485	Wales	122	Moel Ysgyfarnogod	Gwynedd	623	180	2,044	591	30D	124	SH658345	Ma,Sim,Hew,N
486	Ireland	199	An Scraig	Kerry	623	215	2,044	705	49A	70	Q460057	Ma,Sim,Hew,Dil,A,VL
487	Wales	123	Craig-y-llyn	Gwynedd	622	136	2,041	446	30F	124	SH665119	Hu,Sim,Hew,N
488	Ireland	200	Mullach Glas	Galway	622	88	2,041	289	47C	45	L937492	Sim,Hew,Dil,A,VL
489	England	166	High Willhays	Devon	621	537	2,037	1,762	40	191	SX580892	Ma,Sim,Hew,N,CoH,CoU,CoA
490	Wales	124	Moel yr Henfaes	Denbighshire	621	35	2,037	115	30E	125	SJ089369	Sim,Hew,N
491	England	167	Cold Fell	Cumbria	621	168	2,037	551	35A	86	NY605556	Ma,Sim,Hew,N
492	Ireland	201	Maulin	Cork	621	225	2,037	738	51A	84	V712505	Ma,Sim,Hew,Dil,A,VL
493	Wales	125	Gallt y Daren	Gwynedd	619	113	2,032	371	30D	124	SH778344	Hu,Sim,Hew,N
494	Wales	126	Cefn yr Ystrad	Powys	619	180	2,031	591	32A	160	SO087136	Ma,Sim,Hew,N
495	England	168	Windy Gyle	Northumberland/ Scottish Borders	619	113	2,031	371	33	80	NT855152	Hu,Sim,Hew,N,D
496	England	169	Bink Moss	Durham	619	43	2,031	141	35A	91 92	NY875242	Sim,Hew,N
497	Ireland	202	Dart Mountain	Londonderry	619	86	2,031	282	44B	13	H602963	Sim,Hew,Dil,A,VL
498	Ireland	203	Leenaun Hill	Galway	618	359	2,028	1,178	47C	37	L874593	Ma,Sim,Hew,Dil,A,VL
499	Ireland	204	Coumaraglin Mountain	Waterford	617	103	2,024	338	54A	75 82	S282042	Hu,Sim,Hew,Dil,A,VL
500	Ireland	205	Slieve Loughshannagh	Down	617	101	2,024	331	43B	29	J294272	Hu,Sim,Hew,Dil,A,VL
501	England	170	Cushat Law	Northumberland	616	148	2,022	485	33	80	NT928137	Hu,Sim,Hew,N,sMa
502	England	171	Great Borne	Cumbria	616	113	2,021	371	34B	89	NY123163	Hu,Sim,Hew,N,W,B,Sy,Fel
503	England	172	Yewbarrow North Top	Cumbria	616	33	2,021	108	34B	89 90	NY175091	Sim,Hew,N,B,Sy
504	Wales	127	Garreg Lwyd	Carmarthenshire	616	104	2,021	341	32A	160	SN740179	Hu,Sim,Hew,N
505	Ireland	206	Slieve Snaght	Donegal	615	600	2,018	1,969	45A	03	C424390	Ma,Sim,Hew,Dil,A,VL
506	England	173	The Dodd	Northumberland	614	31	2,014	102	35A	86 87	NY791457	Sim,Hew,N
507	England	174	Drumaldrace	North Yorkshire	614	66	2,014	217	35B	98	SD873867	Sim,Hew,N
508	Wales	128	Llechwedd Du	Gwynedd	614	32	2,014	105	30E	124 125	SH893223	Sim,Hew,N
509	England	175	Flinty Fell	Cumbria	614	43	2,014	141	35A	86 87	NY770422	Sim,Hew,N
510	Wales	129	Gorllwyn	Powys	613	88	2,011	289	31C	147	SN917590	Sim,Hew,N
511	Wales	130	Foel Goch	Gwynedd	613	46	2,010	151	30E	125	SH943290	Sim,Hew,N
512	England	176	Middlehope Moor	Durham/ Northumberland	612	38	2,008	125	35A	87	NY862432	Sim,Hew,N
513	Ireland	207	Tievebaun	Leitrim	611	109	2,005	358	45D	16	G768499	Hu,Sim,Hew,Dil,A,VL
514	Ireland	208	Knockbrack	Kerry	611	45	2,005	148	52A	78	V953779	Sim,Hew,Dil,A,VL
515	Wales	131	Foel Goch	Conwy/ Gwynedd	611	274	2,005	899	30D	125	SH953422	Ma,Sim,Hew,N
516	Wales	132	Pen y Garn	Ceredigion	611	194	2,005	636	31C	135 147	SN798771	Ma,Sim,Hew,N
517	Wales	133	Bache Hill	Powys	610	41	2,001	135	31B	137 148	SO213636	Sim,Hew,N
518	England	177	Birks Fell	North Yorkshire	610	158	2,001	518	35B	98	SD918763	Ma,Sim,Hew,N
519	Ireland	209	Coombane	Kerry	610	41	2,001	135	49B	70	Q567091	Sim,Hew,Dil,A,VL
520	Wales	134	Tal y Fan	Conwy	610	190	2,001	622	30B	115	SH729726	Ma,Sim,Hew,N
521	England	178	Bloodybush Edge	Northumberland	610	114	2,001	373	33	80	NT902143	Hu,Sim,Hew,N
522	Wales	135	Mynydd Graig Goch	Gwynedd	610	71	2,000	233	30B	115 123	SH497485	Sim,Hew,N
523	England	179	Thack Moor	Cumbria	610	58	2,000	190	35A	86	NY611462	Sim,Hew,N
524	England	180	Calf Top	Cumbria	610	313	2,000	1,027	35B	98	SD664856	Ma,Sim,Hew,N

== Bibliography ==
- Alan Dawson (1997). The Hewitts and Marilyns of Wales. TACit Press. ISBN 0-9522680-6-X.
- Clem Clements (1998). The Hewitts and Marilyns of Ireland. TACit Press. ISBN 0-9522680-8-6.
- Alan Dawson (1997). The Hewitts and Marilyns of England. TACit Press. ISBN 0-9522680-7-8.
- Alan Dawson (1992). The Relative Hills of Britain. Cicerone Press. ISBN 978-1852840686.

== DoBIH codes ==
The DoBIH uses the following codes for the various classifications of mountains and hills in the British Isles, which many of the above peaks also fall into:

- Ma Marilyn
- Hu HuMP
- Sim Simm
- 5 Dodd
- M Munro
- MT Munro Top
- F Furth
- C Corbett
- G Graham
- D Donald
- DT Donald Top
- Hew Hewitt
- N Nuttall
- Dew Dewey
- DDew Donald Dewey
- HF Highland Five
- 4 400-499m Tump
- 3 300-399m Tump (GB)
- 2 200-299m Tump (GB)
- 1 100-199m Tump (GB)
- 0 0-99m Tump (GB)
- W Wainwright
- WO Wainwright Outlying Fell
- B Birkett
- Sy Synge
- Fel Fellranger
- CoH County Top – Historic (pre-1974)
- CoA County Top – Administrative (1974 to mid-1990s)
- CoU County Top – Current County or Unitary Authority
- CoL County Top – Current London Borough
- SIB Significant Island of Britain
- Dil Dillon
- A Arderin
- VL Vandeleur-Lynam
- MDew Myrddyn Dewey
- O Other list (which includes):
  - Bin Binnion
  - Bg Bridge
  - BL Buxton & Lewis
  - Ca Carn
  - CT Corbett Top
  - GT Graham Top
  - Mur Murdo
  - P500 P500
  - P600 P600
- Un unclassified

prefixes:
- s sub
- x deleted

suffixes:
= twin

== See also ==
- List of mountains of the British Isles by height
- Lists of mountains and hills in the British Isles
- Lists of mountains in Ireland
- List of Munro mountains in Scotland
- List of Murdos (mountains)
- List of Furth mountains in the British Isles
- List of Marilyns in the British Isles
- List of P600 mountains in the British Isles
