= Cadair Berwyn North Top =

Hill in Denbighshire, Wales

- Cadair Berwyn
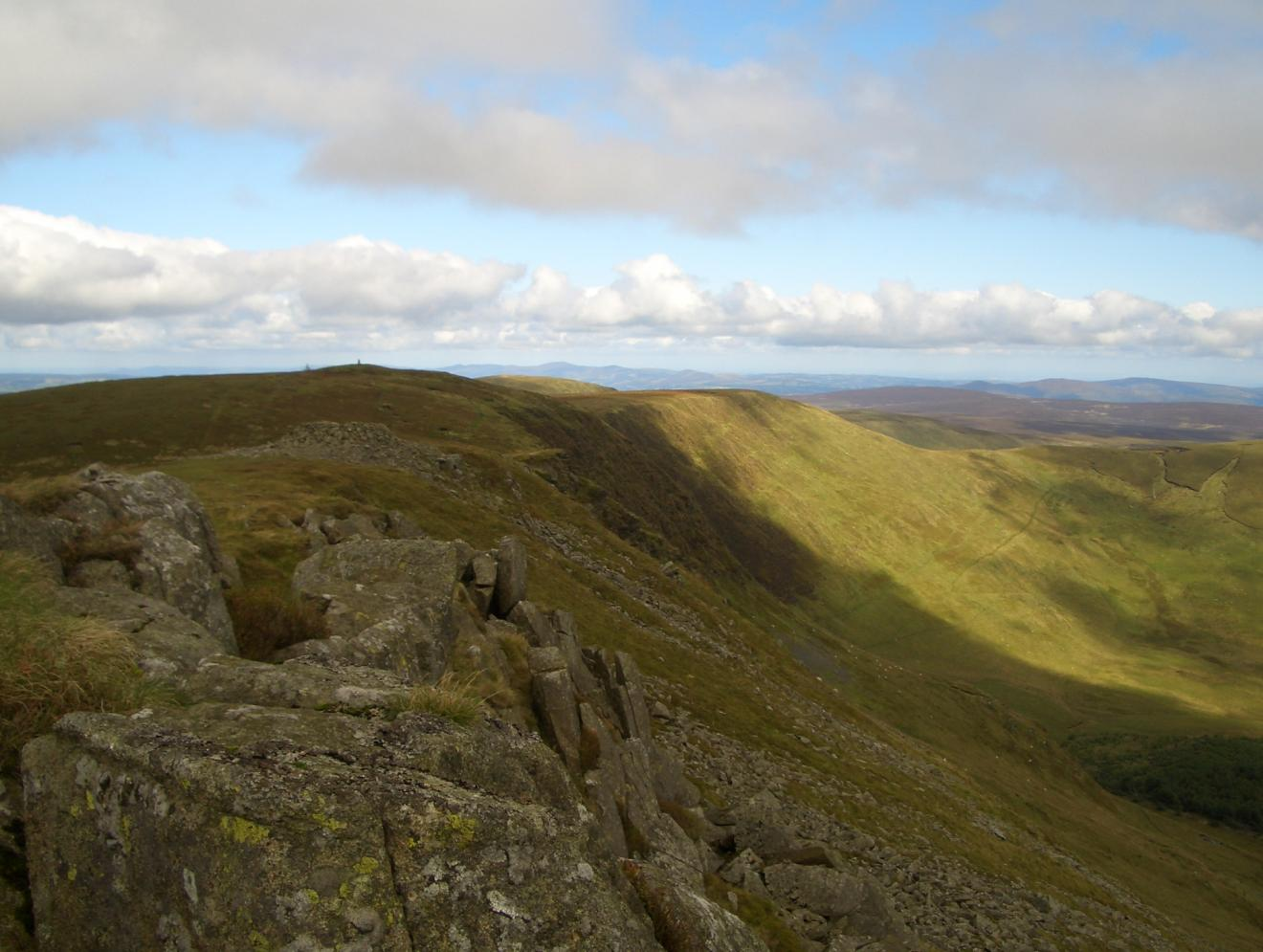
- Cadair Berwyn North Top and Craig Berwyn from Cadair Berwyn

Highest point
- Elevation: 827 m (2,713 ft)
- Prominence: 19 m (62 ft)
- Listing: Nuttall
- Coordinates: 52°53′02″N 3°22′49″W

Naming
- Language of name: Welsh

Geography
- Location: Denbighshire / Powys, Wales
- Parent range: Berwyn range
- OS grid: SJ 07209 32716
- Topo map: OS Landranger 125

Cadair Berwyn North Top or Cadair Berwyn (Old Top) (height 827 metres (2,713 ft) is a top of Cadair Berwyn in north east Wales. It is jointly the second highest summit in the Berwyn range along with Moel Sych (though an accurate survey in 2014 does suggest Moel Sych may be slightly lower at 826.7 metres (2,712 ft)).

The summit was often considered to be the highest summit in the Berwyns until the OS discovered a new top in between it and Moel Sych, which is 5m higher at 832m. This top, now known as Cadair Berwyn, is listed as Cadair Berwyn New Top on the Nuttall list. The summit is the highest point in the modern Denbighshire council area (possibly jointly with Moel Sych), but not the historic county (which is the higher summit of Cadair Berwyn).

The summit has a trig point. To the north-east is Cadair Bronwen, to the south-east is Tomle, Foel Wen and Mynydd Tarw.
