= Milltir Cerrig =

Mountain pass in North Wales

Coordinates: 52.860°N 3.459°W

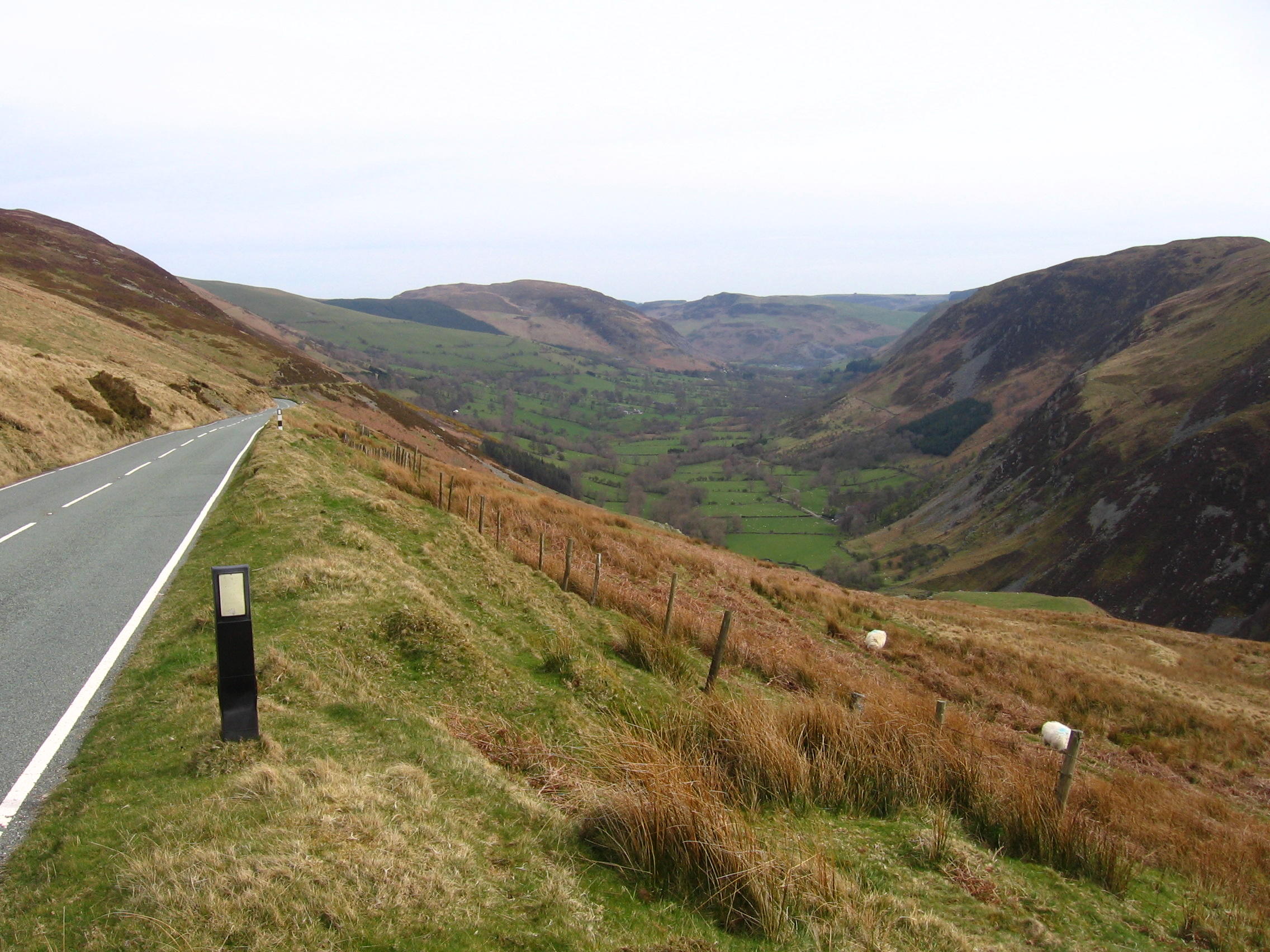
Looking down the Tanat Valley towards Llangynog, from near the summit of the Milltir Cerrig

The Milltir Cerrig (Welsh for "mile of stones") is a mountain pass in Wales, on the B4391 between Bala (in the county of Gwynedd) and Llangynog (Powys), briefly passing through Denbighshire.

It crosses the Berwyn mountain range at an altitude of 486 metres (1594 feet). From the summit of the pass, a bridleway heads east across the main Berwyn summits; Moel Sych, Cadair Berwyn and Cadair Bronwen. These three peaks can be seen on the climb from Bala.

The mountain pass is approximately 9 miles long; a 4-mile climb up the head of the Tanat Valley from Llangynog, or 5 miles across bleak moorland from the B4391/B4402 junction near Bala.
