= Foel Wen South Top =

Mountain in Wales

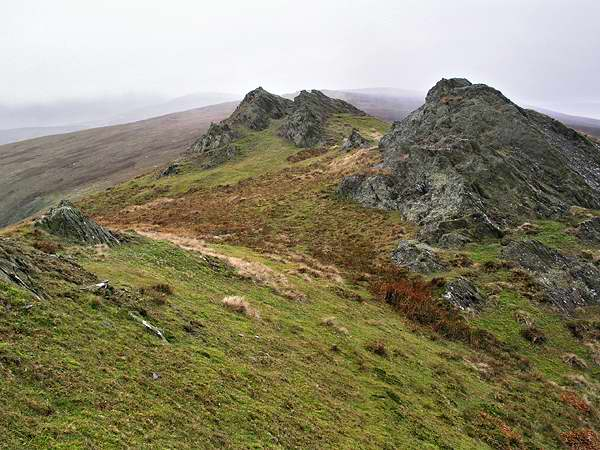

Highest point
- Elevation: 687 m (2,254 ft)
- Prominence: 21 m (69 ft)
- Listing: sub Hewitt, Nuttall
- Coordinates: 52°53′15″N 3°20′7″W

Naming
- English translation: white hill
- Language of name: Welsh

Geography
- Location within Wales
- Location: Denbighshire / Powys, Wales
- Parent range: Berwyn range
- OS grid: SJ 10232 33054
- Topo map: OS Landranger 125

Foel Wen South Top is a top of Foel Wen in north east Wales. It is one of the summits found on the most easterly of Cadair Berwyn's long south ridges.

The summit is grassy, and unmarked. To the north lies Tomle, while to the south lies its Mynydd Tarw.
