= Berwyn Mountain UFO incident =

1974 UFO incident in Wales, United Kingdom

Location of Llandrillo, Wales.

On 23 January 1974 on the Berwyn Mountains in Llandrillo, Merionethshire, Wales, lights and noises were observed that were alleged to have been related to a UFO sighting on Cadair Berwyn and Cadair Bronwen. Scientific evidence indicated that the event was generated by an earthquake, as well as sightings of a bright meteor widely observed over Wales and northern England at the time.

== History ==
On the evening of 23 January 1974, residents of the Berwyn Mountains area in northern Wales reported a loud noise and a bright light in the sky. When ufologists claimed that a UFO had crashed and that the British Government was covering up the military's recovery of a fallen spaceship, some tabloid newspapers jokingly labelled it "The Roswelsh Incident".

Scientific evidence indicates the event was generated by an earthquake, along with sightings of a bright meteor widely observed over Wales and Northern England at the time.

Declassified Ministry of Defence documents also assert the incident was caused by the combined effects of an earthquake and a meteor. The Institute of Geological Sciences (now British Geological Survey) reported that a magnitude 3.5 earthquake was felt at 8:38 p.m. over a wide area of northern Wales and as far as Formby in England, 21 kilometres (13 mi) north of Liverpool. It was not immediately identified as an earthquake, hence the police investigation. However, the magnitude of the shock was such that had it been due to a crash, the resulting crater would have been large enough to be easily visible. The unusual lights may also have involved the phenomenon known as earthquake lights.

== In popular culture ==
The incident was the subject of a segment on BBC1's The One Show on 2 March 2021.

A 2017 episode of Ancient Aliens speculated that a UFO crashed at Berwyn and its wreckage was likely taken to Rudloe Manor.

== See also ==
- UFO sightings in the United Kingdom
