= Foel Cwm Sian Llŵyd =

Summit in Gwynedd, Wales

Coordinates: 52.870516°N 3.495035°W

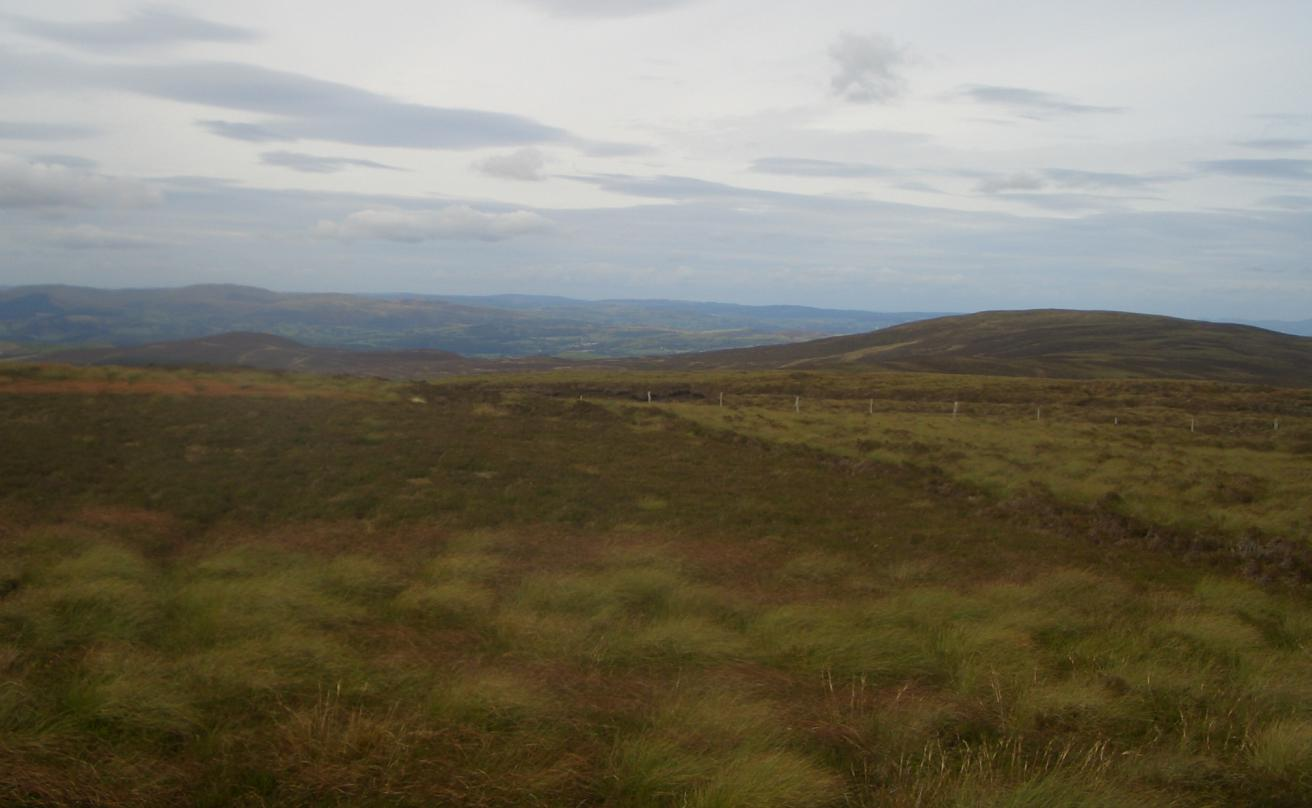
- Foel Cwm Sian Llwyd from Y Groes Fagl

Highest point
- Elevation: 648 m (2,126 ft)
- Prominence: 57 m (187 ft)
- Listing: Hewitt, Nuttall

Naming
- Language of name: Welsh

Geography
- Location: Gwynedd, Wales
- Parent range: Berwyn range
- OS grid: SH995313
- Topo map: OS Landranger 125

Foel Cwm Sian Llŵyd is a subsidiary summit of Cyrniau Nod in north east Wales. It forms a part of the Berwyn range known as the Hirnantau. Its summit has the Snowdonia National Park boundary running through it, and is the most easterly 2000 ft summit in the park.

The views from the summit are extensive, if unremarkable due to the featureless, flat moorland surroundings. The summit is marked by a trig point. At the northern end of the summit area lies a ruined stone tower.
