= Pen y Boncyn Trefeilw =

Mountain (646m) in Gwynedd, Wales

Coordinates: 52°50′33″N 3°32′30″W

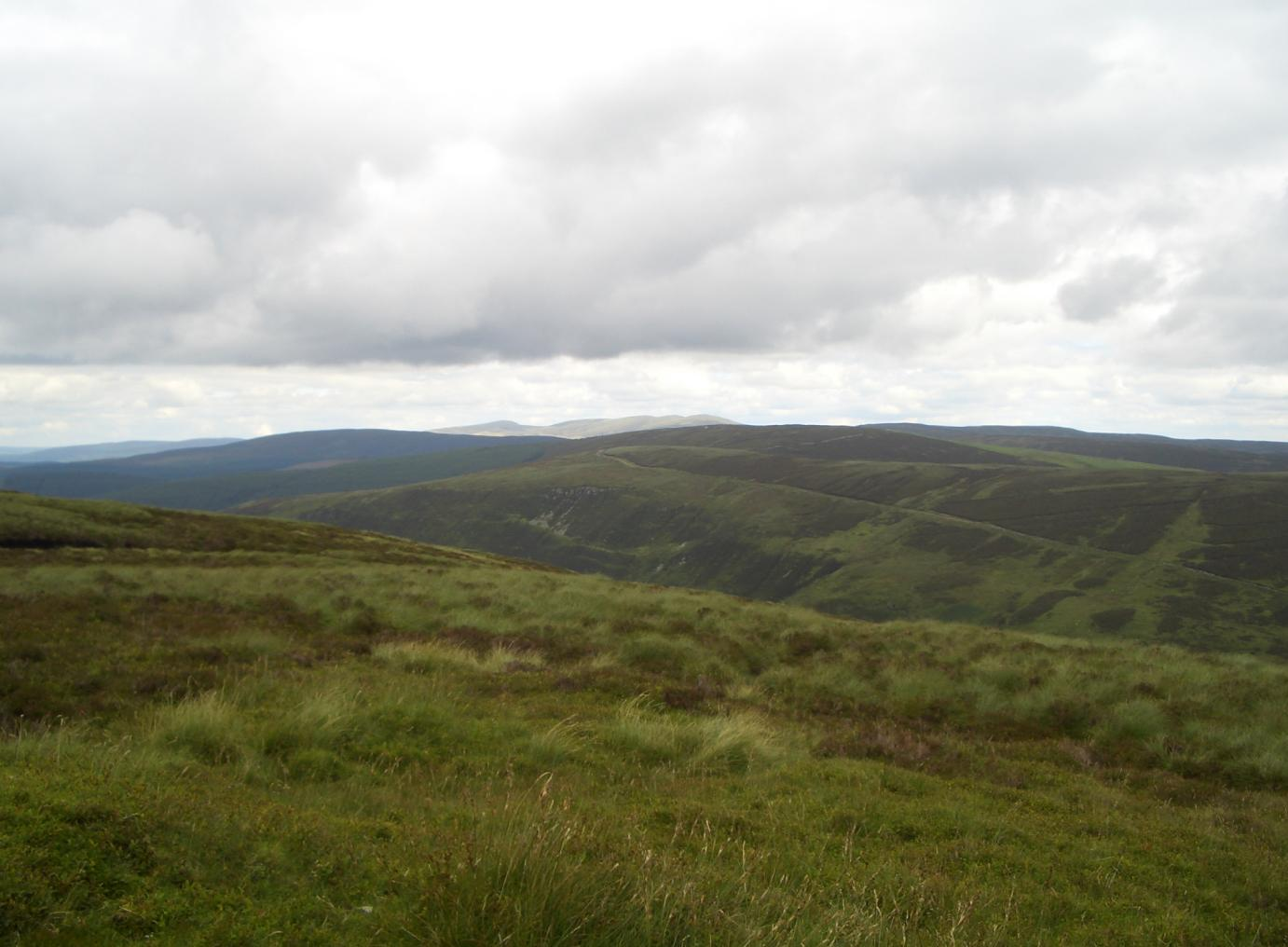
- Pen y Boncyn Trefeilw from Foel y Geifr

Highest point
- Elevation: 646 m (2,119 ft)
- Prominence: 57 m (187 ft)
- Listing: Hewitt, Nuttall

Naming
- Language of name: Welsh

Geography
- Location: Gwynedd, Wales
- Parent range: Berwyn range
- OS grid: SH 96255 28339
- Topo map: OS Landranger 125

Listed summits of Pen y Boncyn Trefeilw
Name	Grid ref	Height	Status
Stac Rhos	SJ085335	630 metres (2,067 ft)	sub Hewitt, Nuttall

Pen y Boncyn Trefeilw is a subsidiary summit of Cyrniau Nod in north east Wales. It forms a part of the Berwyn range called the Hirnantau. It has two tops: Stac Rhos and Pen y Cerrig Duon. Pen y Cerrig Duon is now listed as a deleted Nuttall due to re-surveying.

The views from the summit are extensive, if unremarkable due to the featureless, flat moorland surroundings. The summit is marked by a small cairn, is which located only a few metres from a track road that continues on to the pass between Cyrniau Nod and Y Groes Fagl.
