= Tomle =

Hill in Powys, Wales

Coordinates: 52°53′30″N 3°21′39″W

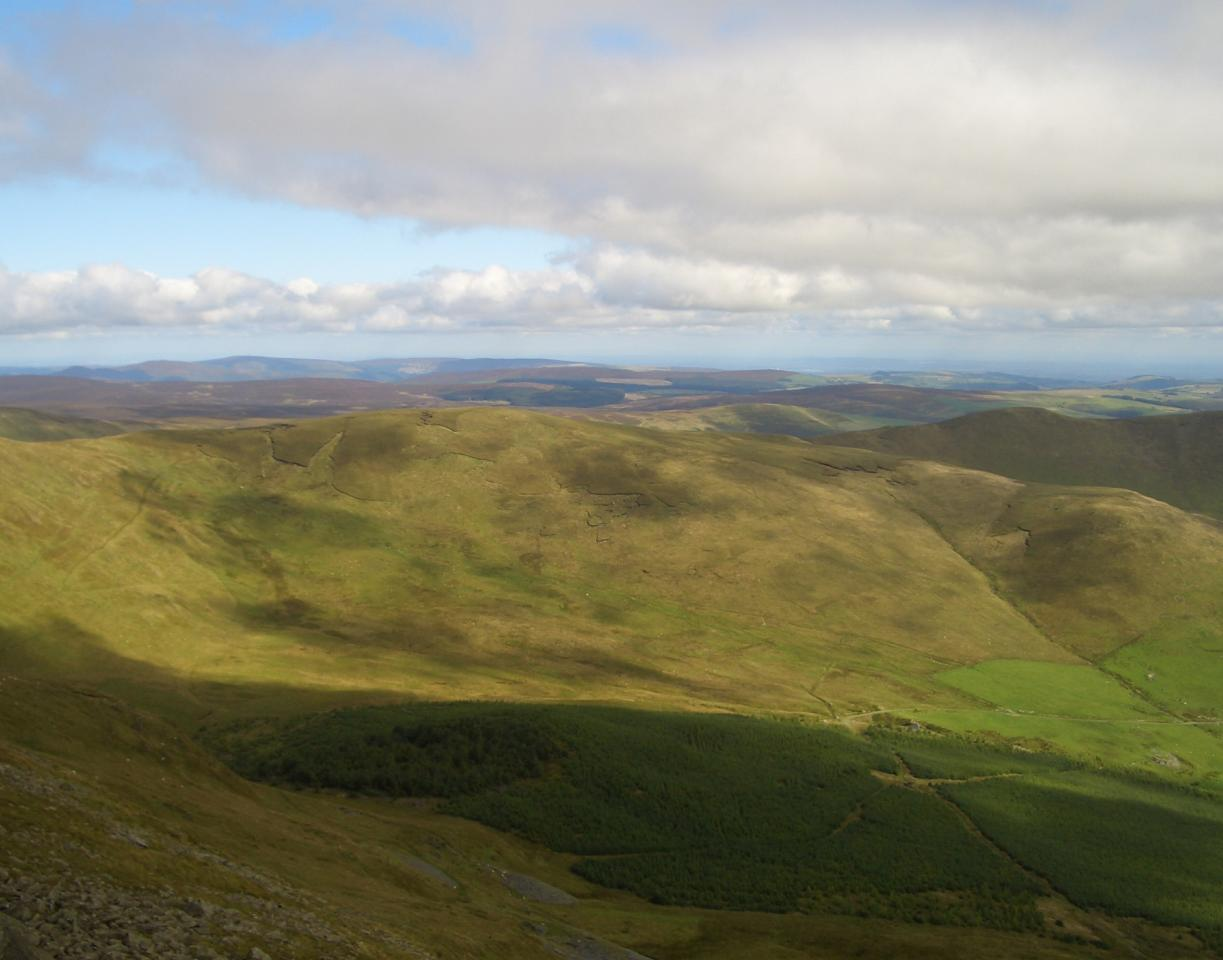
- Tomle from Cadair Berwyn North Top

Highest point
- Elevation: 741 m (2,431 ft)
- Prominence: 21 m (69 ft)
- Listing: sub Hewitt, Nuttall

Naming
- Language of name: Welsh

Geography
- Location: Denbighshire / Powys, Wales
- Parent range: Berwyn range
- OS grid: SJ 08548 33572
- Topo map: OS Landranger 125

Tomle is a top of Cadair Berwyn in north east Wales. It is the highest of the summits found on the most easterly of Cadair Berwyn's long south ridges.

Tomle's summit is boggy and unmarked. To the north, the ridge continues up to Cadair Berwyn North Top. The Craig Berwyn face starting on the west side of the ridge. To the south lies Foel Wen, Foel Wen South Top and Mynydd Tarw, and to the west Godor.
