= Moel yr Ewig =

Hill in Powys, Wales

Coordinates: 52°52′32″N 3°22′2″W

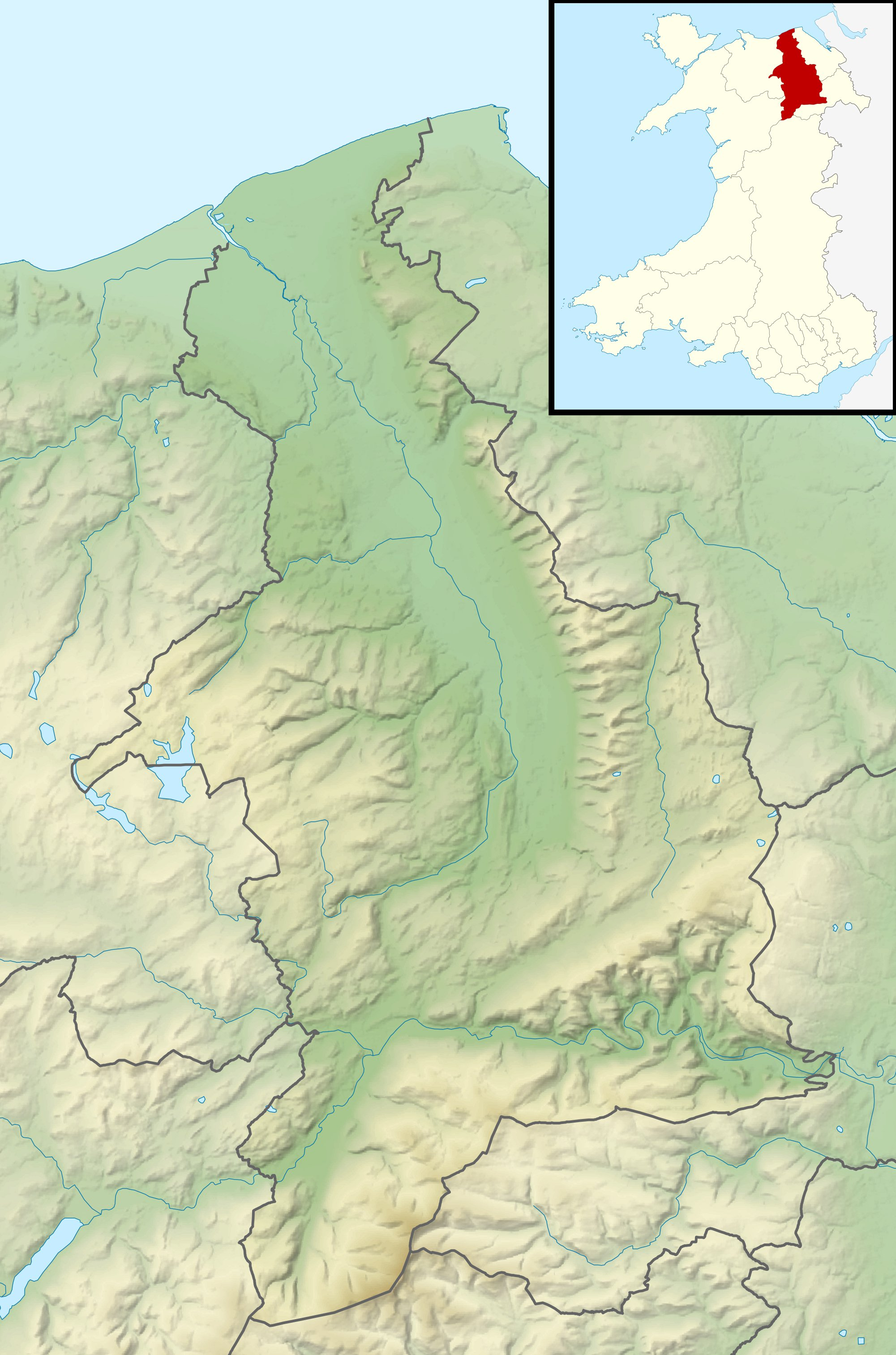
- Location within Denbighshire

Highest point
- Elevation: 695 m (2,280 ft)
- Prominence: 24 m (79 ft)
- Parent peak: Cadair Berwyn
- Listing: sub Hewitt, Nuttall

Naming
- Language of name: Welsh

Geography
- Location: Denbighshire / Powys, Wales
- Parent range: Berwyn range
- OS grid: SJ 08077 31775
- Topo map: OS Landranger 125

Moel yr Ewig is a top of Cadair Berwyn in north east Wales. It lies on a ridge heading south from Cadair Berwyn's summit. The summits of Godor and Godor North Top are to be found further down the ridge.

The summit is a grassy knoll marked by a few stones.
