= Stac Rhos =

Hill (630m) in Gwynedd, Wales

Coordinates: 52°50′20″N 3.°31′55″W

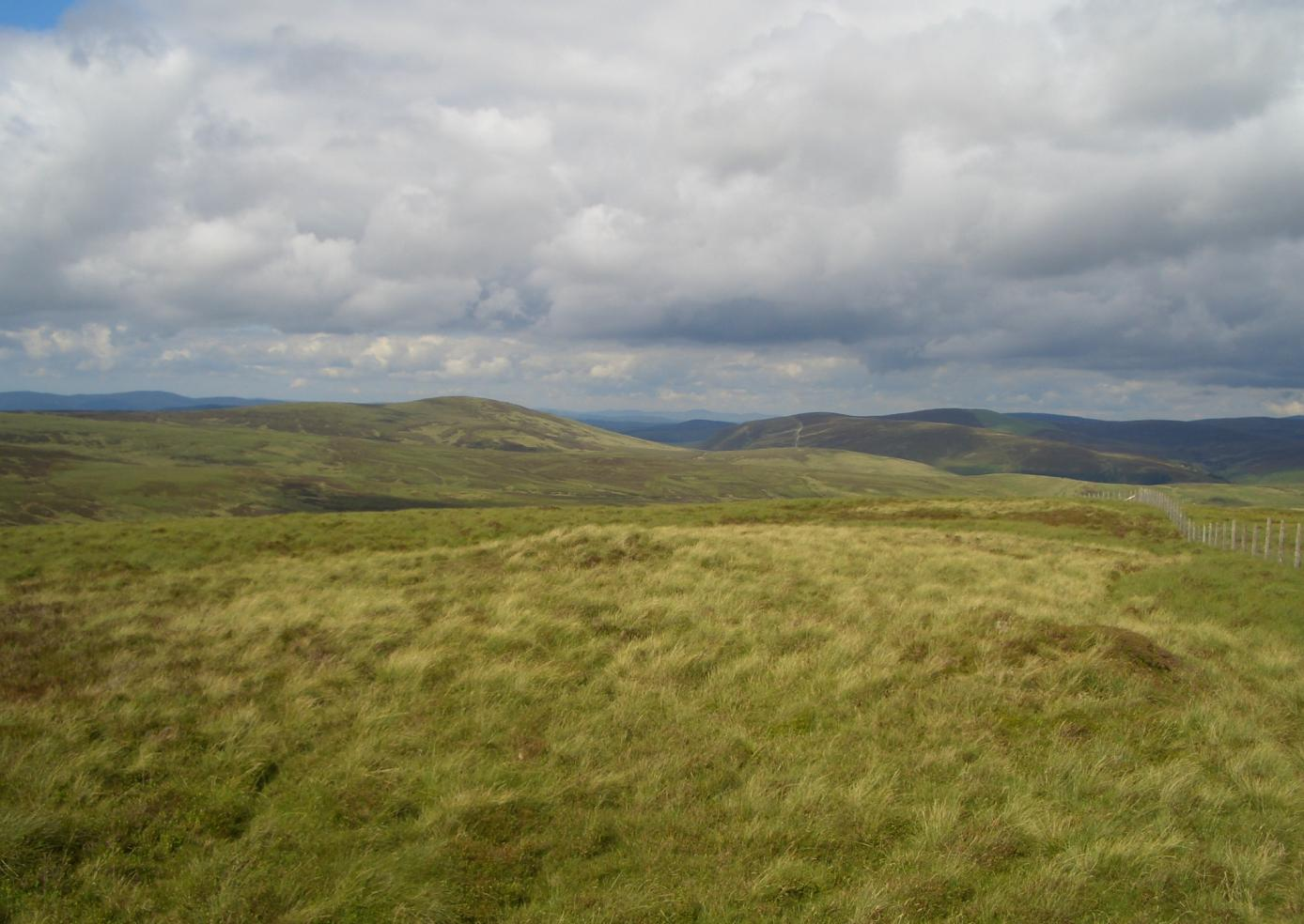
- Left to right: Foel y Geifr, Pen y Boncyn Trefeilw, Stac Rhos and Cefn Gwyntog from Moel y Cerrig Duon

Highest point
- Elevation: 630 m (2,070 ft)
- Prominence: 25 m (82 ft)
- Listing: sub Hewitt, Nuttall

Naming
- Language of name: Welsh

Geography
- Location: Gwynedd, Wales
- Parent range: Berwyn range
- OS grid: SH 96914 27933
- Topo map: OS Landranger 125

Stac Rhos is a top of Pen y Boncyn Trefeilw in north east Wales. It forms a part of the Berwyn range called the Hirnantau.

The views from the summit are extensive, if unremarkable due to the featureless, flat moorland surroundings. The summit is marked by a small cairn, and a boundary stone. To the east is Cyrniau Nod, while Cefn Gwyntog is to the south-east.
