= Godor North Top =

Hill in Powys, Wales

Coordinates: 52°52′12″N 3°21′15″W

Highest point
- Elevation: 675 m (2,215 ft)
- Prominence: 17 m (56 ft)
- Listing: Nuttall

Naming
- Language of name: Welsh

Geography
- Location: Denbighshire / Powys, Wales
- Parent range: Berwyn range
- OS grid: SJ 08937 31134
- Topo map: OS Landranger 125

Godor North Top is a top of Cadair Berwyn in north east Wales. It is the lower twin summit of Godor.

The summit is a grassy, marked by a pile of stones.
