= Banc Bugeilyn =

Hill (551m) in Powys, Wales

Coordinates: 52.52°N 3.73°W

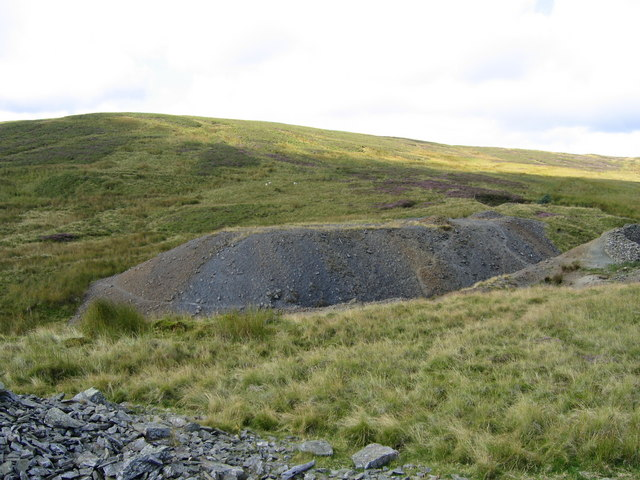
Cafartha Quarry (or Nantddu) on the western slopes of the Bank Bugeilyn. Lead and copper was mined here in the 19th century.

Banc Bugeilyn is a hill found in Plynlimon between Aberystwyth and Welshpool in the United Kingdom; grid reference SN826925.

The summit is class as a Dewey. The height of the summit from sea level is 551 m (1808 ft).
