= Pumlumon Fach =

Hill (664m) in Ceredigion, Wales

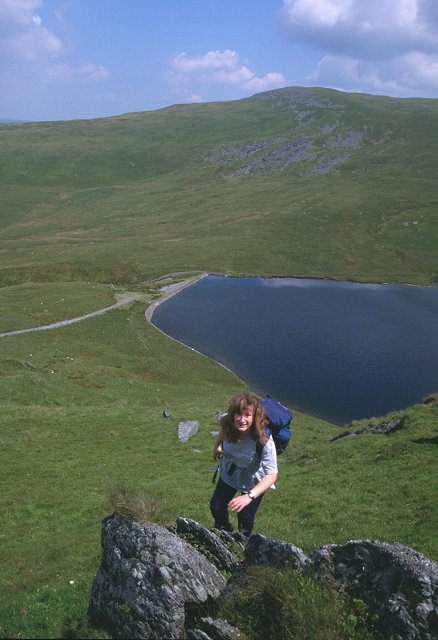
- On the Pumlumon Fach

Highest point
- Elevation: 664 m (2,178 ft)
- Prominence: 20 m (66 ft)
- Parent peak: Pen Pumlumon Fawr
- Listing: Nuttall
- Coordinates: 52.4708°N 3.7848°W

Naming
- Language of name: Welsh

Geography
- Location: Ceredigion, Wales
- Parent range: Cambrian Mountains
- OS grid: SN789869
- Topo map: OS Landranger 135

Pumlumon Fach is a top of Pen Pumlumon Fawr on the Plynlimon massif, a part of the Cambrian Mountains in the county of Ceredigion, Wales. It lies on small ridge heading north-west from the summit of Pen Pumlumon Fawr.

The summit is marked by small cairn, and overlooks the Nant-y-moch Reservoir to the north and Llyn Llygad Rheidiol to the east. The views also include the smaller summits of Drosgol (550m) and Banc Llechwedd-mawr (560m) and Cwm Hyddgen, a hide out of Owain Glyndŵr and his army.
