= Plynlimon =

Mountain in Cambrian Mountains, Wales

Pen Pumlumon Fawr
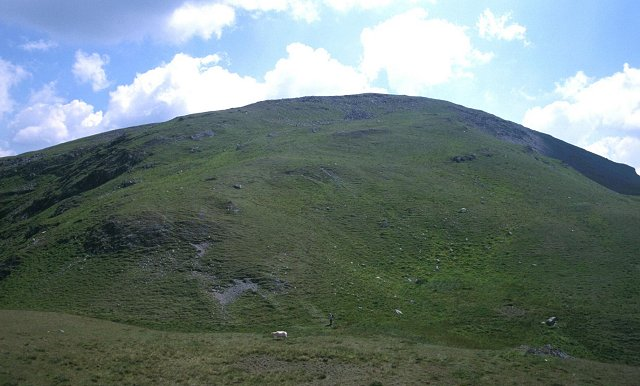
- The northern slopes of Pumlumon Fawr

Highest point
- Elevation: 752 m (2,467 ft)
- Prominence: 526 m (1,726 ft)
- Listing: Marilyn, Hewitt, Council top, Nuttall
- Coordinates: 52.4675°N 3.7828°W

Naming
- English translation: five tops, five beacons
- Language of name: Welsh
- Pronunciation: Welsh: [ˈpɛn pɪmˈlɪmɔn ˈvau̯r]

Geography
- Location: Ceredigion, Wales
- Parent range: Cambrian Mountains
- OS grid: SN789869
- Topo map: OS Landranger 135

Listed summits of Plynlimon
| Name | Grid ref | Height | Status |
|---|---|---|---|
| Pen Pumlumon Arwystli | SN815877 | 741 m | Hewitt, Nuttall |
| Pen Pumlumon Llygad-bychan | SN799871 | 727 m | Hewitt, Nuttall |
| Y Garn | SN775851 | 684 m | Hewitt, Nuttall |
| Pumlumon Fach | SN787874 | 664 m | Nuttall |
| Pumlumon Cwmbiga | SN830899 | 620 m | Deleted Nuttall |
| Carnfachbugeilyn | SN826903 | 622 m | Unclassified |
| Banc Bugeilyn | SN826925 | 551 m | Dewey |
| Bryn yr Ŵyn | SN840927 | 502 m | Dewey |

Plynlimon, or Pumlumon in Welsh (also historically anglicised as Plinlimon, Plynlymmon or Plinlimmon), is the highest point of the Cambrian Mountains in Wales (taking a restricted definition of the Cambrian Mountains, excluding Snowdonia, the Berwyns and the Brecon Beacons), and the highest point in Mid Wales. It is a massif that dominates the surrounding countryside and is the highest point of Ceredigion.

The highest point of the massif itself is Pen Pumlumon Fawr, which is 752 metres (2,467 ft) above ordnance datum. Its other important peaks are Pen Pumlumon Arwystli, Y Garn, Pen Pumlumon Llygad-bychan and Pumlumon Fach. Bryn yr Ŵyn, or 'hill of the lambs', is a former Dewey in the foothills.

The longest river in Britain, the River Severn, has its source on the mountain, as do the rivers Wye and Rheidol.

Folklore says there is a sleeping giant in Plynlimon.

== Etymology ==
Plynlimon is anglicised from the Welsh name Pumlumon, which is thought to mean "five tops" or "five beacons". The first element is Old Welsh pimp, meaning "five" (Modern Welsh pump), and the second is llumon, "beacon", an element whose Brittonic equivalent underlies the Scottish hill-names Lomond Hills and Ben Lomond.

== Habitat and restoration ==
The Plynlimon area is the source of the rivers Wye, Severn and Rheidol. Since 2007 the Wildlife Trusts of Wales have been working to improve the habitat as a "living landscape" project. This watershed area has been affected by loss of biodiversity, erosion of the peaty soils' structure, and accelerated drainage.

Like most of the uplands across Wales, intensive land use activities have resulted in many habitats being either lost or degraded. Over-grazing of sheep has induced soil compaction, which has resulted in increased flooding of the lowland areas. The principal land cover within the project area is dominated by a complex mosaic of locally, nationally and internationally important habitats and species, such as dry and wet dwarf-shrub heathland, blanket bog, unimproved acid grassland and a number of oligotrophic lakes. Agriculturally improved grassland, broadleaved woodlands and forestry plantation are also characteristic features of the area.

The Plynlimon area is also important for breeding, wintering and feeding bird fauna particularly hen harrier, merlin, short-eared owl and red and black grouse, and a number of Red Data Book and UK BAP invertebrates. The red kite also frequents the area. Golden plovers have declined by 92% since 1992.

== Severn Way ==
The Severn Way runs for 224 miles (360 km) along the River Severn between its source at Plynlimon and the mouth of the Severn at Bristol, England.
