= Coity Mountain =

Mountain in Wales

Coordinates: 51.764498°N 3.113727°W

- Mynydd Coety
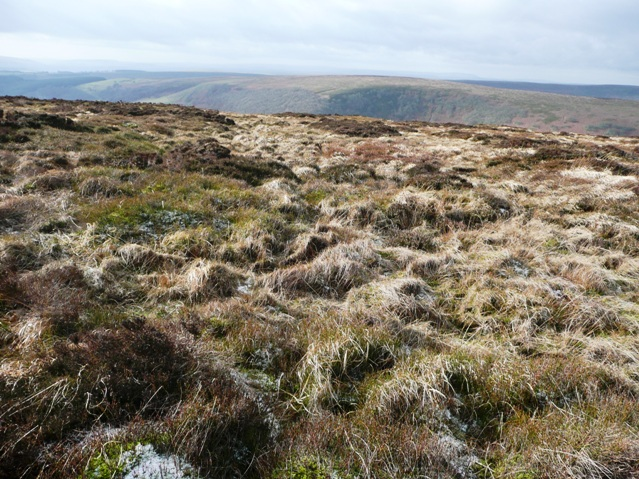
- On Coity Mountain

Highest point
- Elevation: 578 m (1,896 ft)
- Prominence: 231 m (758 ft)
- Listing: Marilyn, Dewey, council top (Torfaen, Blaenau Gwent)

Geography
- Location: Torfaen / Blaenau Gwent, Wales
- Parent range: Brecon Beacons (outlier)
- OS grid: SO231079
- Topo map: OS Landranger 161

Coity Mountain (also spelled Coety Mountain, Welsh: Mynydd Coety) is a flat-topped mountain in the South Wales Valleys, between Blaenavon and Abertillery. The highest points of both Torfaen and Blaenau Gwent unitary authorities are at the summit of Coity Mountain. The summit is also known as Twyn Ffynhonnau Goerion. Some 2 km (1 mi) to the southeast lies a major subsidiary top of the hill, Mynydd Varteg Fawr (549m) at the southeastern end of whose broad ridge is a trig point at 544m. A few hundred metres to the southeast of this summit is a memorial known as the Dog Stone which commemorates Carlo the Red Setter, a dog shot accidentally by his master while hunting on the 12 August 1864. Co-ordinates for the Dog Stone 51.45'15.58N 3.05'08.81W. Other notable tops include those of Mulfran (524m) (Welsh for cormorant, pronounced 'mill-vran') which overlooks the town of Brynmawr and Mynydd James immediately east of the town of Blaina.

Much of the mountain, including the summit is included in the Blaenavon Industrial Landscape World Heritage Site, and a labyrinth of coal mines, including Big Pit National Coal Museum lies under the mountain.

== Geology ==
The hill is formed from a succession of Carboniferous age sandstones and mudstones, notably the Pennant Sandstone, outcrops of which occur in places around the margins of its plateau-like top. The stone has been worked in places for building stone and a number of abandoned small quarries may be seen. The lower slopes of the hill are in the Coal Measures and have been intensively worked for coal with considerable areas of landscaped opencast workings evident along its northeastern side. Coity Mountain is likely to have stood above the ice during the last ice age as, unlike in surrounding valleys, there is no glacial till to be found on its slopes. There are areas of peat and accumulations of head and many small landslips adorn its steeper slopes.

== Access ==
A number of public rights of way cross the mountain though none traverse the summit. There are in addition a number of vehicular tracks and smaller paths which run both around its flanks and along its broad main ridge. Most of the mountain is access land under the Countryside and Rights of Way Act 2000 and can be freely traversed on foot.
