= Dog Stone, Mynydd Varteg =

Dog Stone
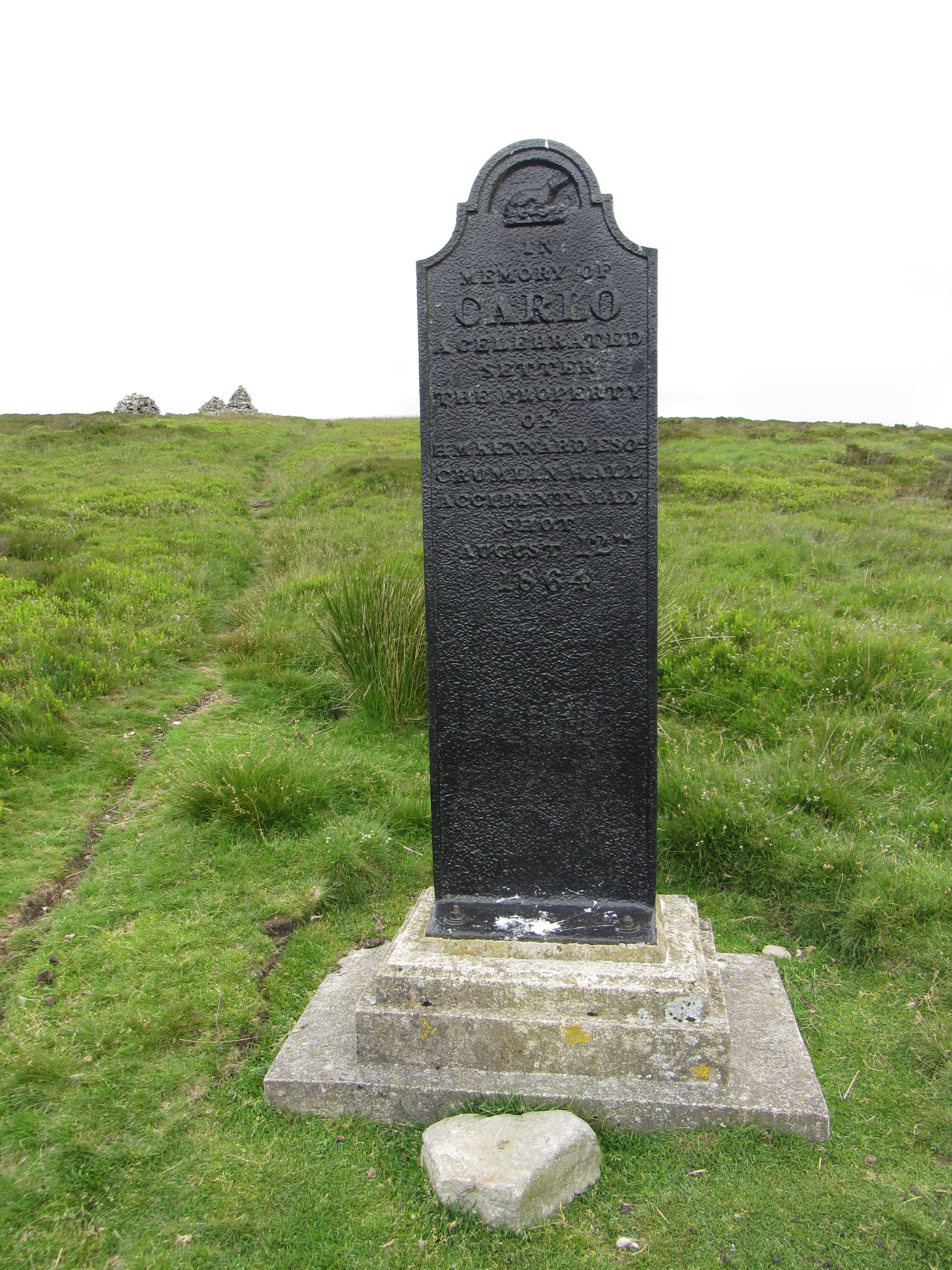
- "a good unusual example "

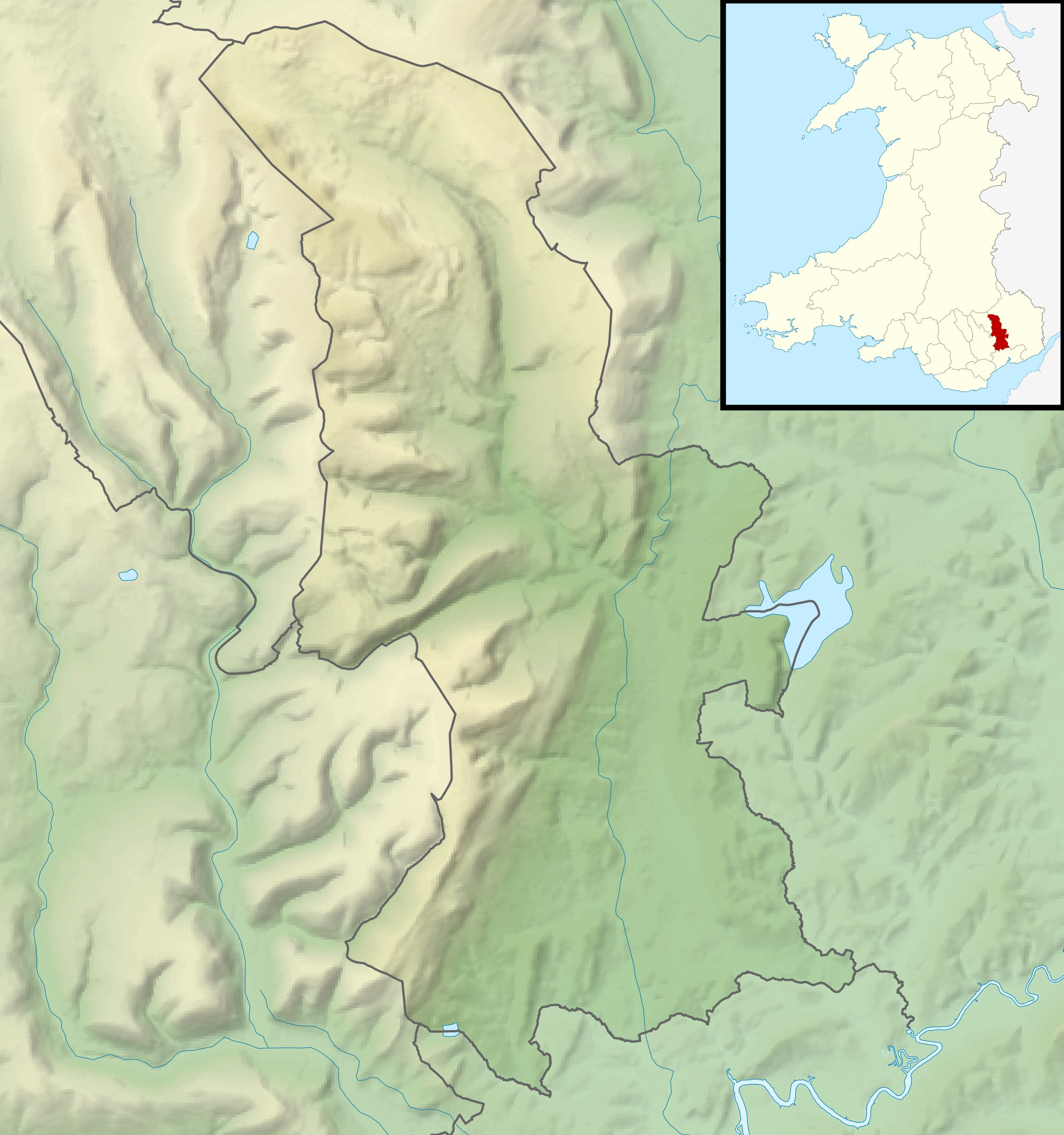
- Location within Torfaen
- 51.7543°N 3.0857°W
- Type: Memorial
- Location: Abersychan, Torfaen

History
- Built: 1864

Site notes
- Governing body: Cadw

Listed Building – Grade II
- Official name: The Dog Stone
- Designated: 13 December 2010
- Reference no.: 87618

The Dog Stone (or Pillar Stone), on Mynydd Farteg, a subsidiary top of Coity Mountain, near the village of Abersychan, Torfaen, Wales, is a memorial, dating from 1864, to "Carlo", a Red setter. It is a Grade II listed structure.

== History and description ==
In memory of CARLO,
a celebrated setter,
the property of H M Kennard Esq, Crumlin Hall,
accidentally shot August 12th 1864

— Memorial inscription

Carlo was a hunting dog, of the Red setter breed, owned by Henry Martyn Kennard (1833–1911). The Kennards, of Crumlin Hall, were local ironmasters and landowners, Henry Martyn's father Robert Kennard (1800–1870) having gained control of the Blaenavon Ironworks through his Blaenavon Coal and Iron Company in 1836. (Note: The Kennard's Welsh home, Crumlin Hall, subsequently became the Crumlin Mining and Technical College.) At a shooting party held on the hill on the Glorious Twelfth in August 1864, Carlo was accidentally, and fatally, shot. Kennard had the dog buried at the site of the accident, and arranged for a memorial headstone to be cast at Blaenavon and erected over the dog's grave.

The memorial comprises a single sheet of cast iron on a plinth of concrete. Above the inscription (see box), is a cast of a dog with its snout raised. It has been catalogued in the archives of the Royal Commission on the Ancient and Historical Monuments of Wales and is a Grade II listed structure, Cadw's listing record describing it as "a good unusual example of a cast iron memorial slab".

== Sources ==
- Evans, J. A. H. (Spring 2000). "Big Pit, Blaenavon – A New Chronology?". Gwent Local History. Gwent Local History Council.
