= Mynydd Tarw =

Mountain in Powys, Wales

Coordinates: 52°52′56″N 3°19′12″W

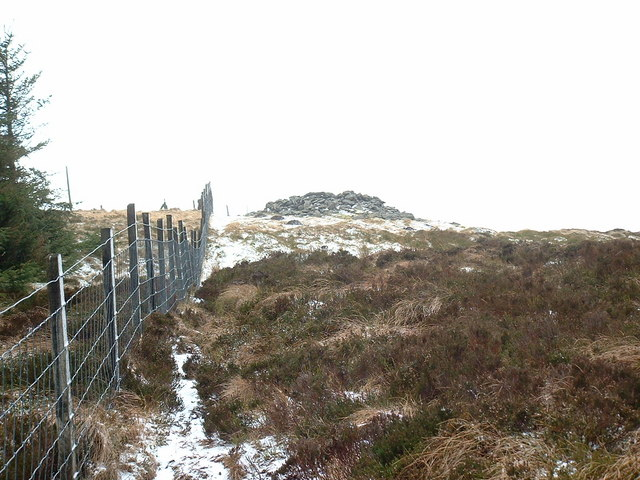
- Cairn on Mynydd Tarw

Highest point
- Elevation: 679 m (2,228 ft)
- Prominence: 44 m (144 ft)
- Listing: Hewitt, Nuttall

Naming
- English translation: mountain of the bull
- Language of name: Welsh

Geography
- Location: Denbighshire / Powys, Wales
- Parent range: Berwyn range
- OS grid: SJ 11265 32442
- Topo map: OS Landranger 125

Mynydd Tarw (pronounced [ˈmənɨð ˈtaru]) is a subsidiary summit of Cadair Berwyn in north east Wales. It used to have a top: Rhos which has now been deleted as a Nuttall.

The summit has a large shelter cairn. The views are extensive, with the lower; northern and western Berwyns visible, including Pen Bwlch Llandrillo. Cadair Berwyn, Godor, Moel yr Ewig and Foel Wen are also in view.
