= Y Groes Fagl =

Hill (659m) in Gwynedd, Wales

Coordinates: 52°50′56″N 3.°30′12″W

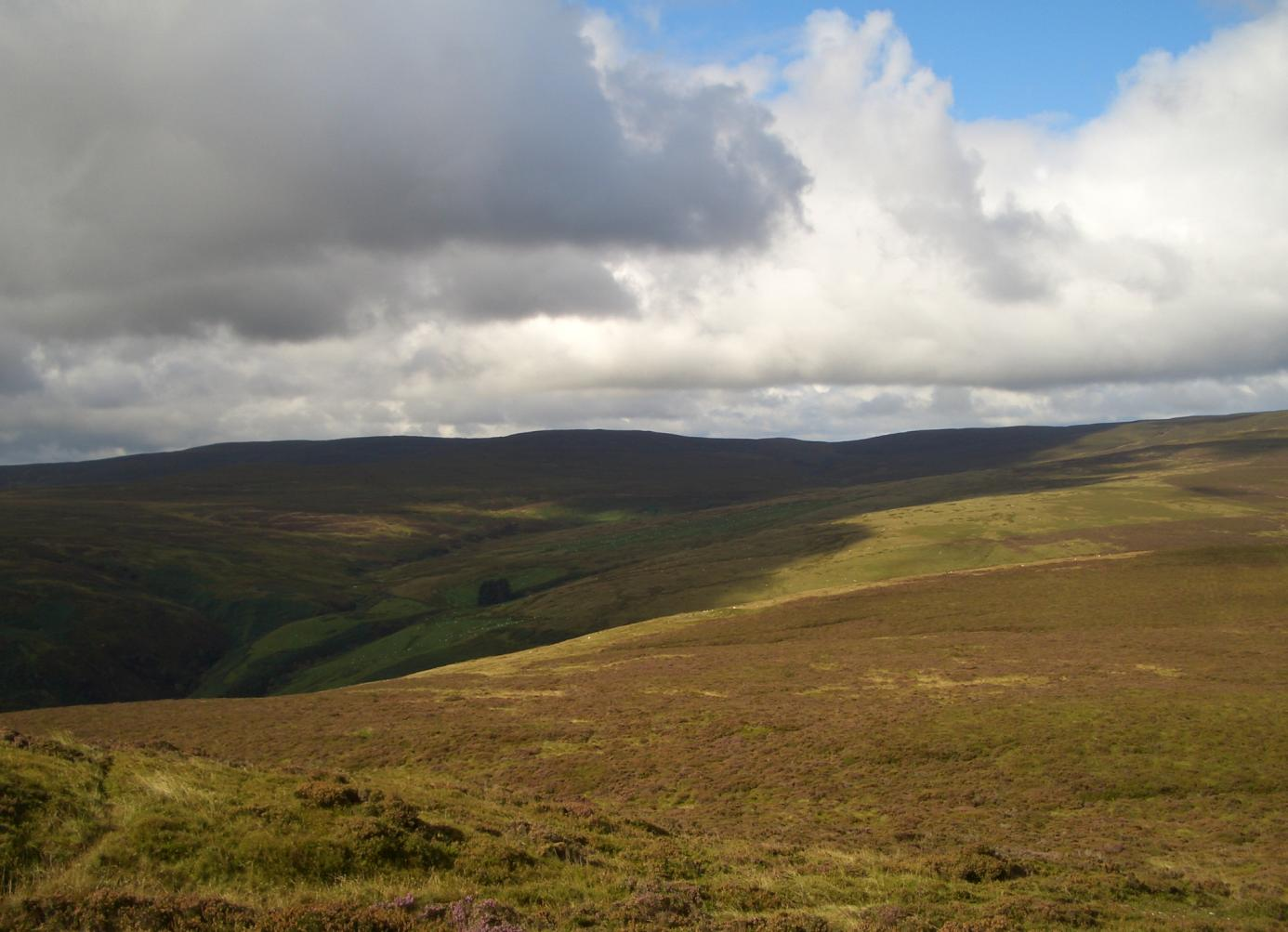
- Cyrniau Nod (left) and Y Groes Fagl (right) from the Post Gwyn ridge

Highest point
- Elevation: 659 m (2,162 ft)
- Prominence: 15.5 m (51 ft)
- Listing: Nuttall

Naming
- Language of name: Welsh

Geography
- Location: Gwynedd, Wales
- Parent range: Berwyn range
- OS grid: SH 98852 28999
- Topo map: OS Landranger 125

Y Groes Fagl is a top of Cyrniau Nod in north east Wales. It forms a part of the Berwyn range known as the Hirnantau. Its summit has the Snowdonia National Park boundary located just to the east of it.

The views from the summit are extensive, if unremarkable due to the featureless, flat moorland surroundings. The summit is marked by a post. To the north, the ridge continues to Foel Cwm Sian Llwyd.
