= Pumlumon Cwmbiga =

Hill (620m) in Ceredigion, Wales

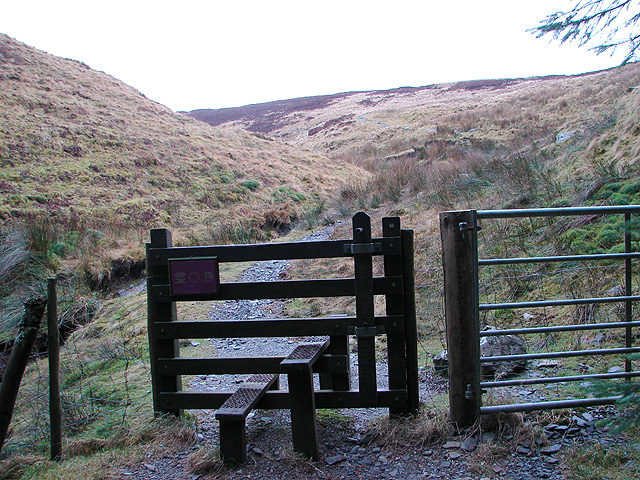

Highest point
- Elevation: 620 m (2,030 ft)
- Prominence: 12.2 m (40 ft)
- Coordinates: 52.49°N 3.72°W

Geography
- Location within Wales
- Location: Ceredigion, Wales
- Parent range: Pumlumon

Pumlumon Cwmbiga is a summit of the Pumlumon mountain range in Ceredigion, Wales. It is 620 metres (2,034) feet above sea level and is a deleted Nuttall, only just missing out on the criteria. The nearby summit of Carnfachbugeilyn is slightly higher at 622 metres (2,041 feet).
