= Moel Fferna =

Mountain in Denbighshire, Wales

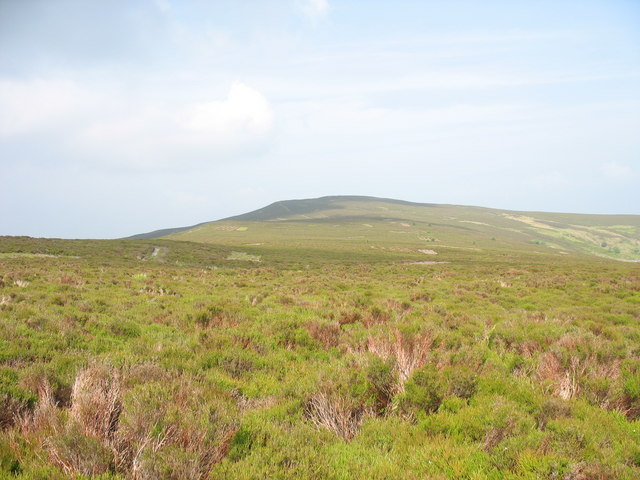
- Moel Fferna from Vivod Mountain.

Highest point
- Elevation: 630 m (2,070 ft)
- Prominence: 105 m (344 ft)
- Parent peak: Cadair Berwyn
- Listing: Hewitt, Nuttall, HuMP
- Coordinates: 52°56′54″N 3°18′57″W

Geography
- Location within Wales
- Location: Denbighshire / Wrexham, Wales
- Parent range: Berwyn range
- OS grid: SJ077346
- Topo map: OS Landranger 125

Moel Fferna is a mountain in Denbighshire, Wales and forms part of the Berwyn range. It is the most northern outpost of the range. The summit is covered in deep heather and has a shelter cairn.

A trig point was used to mark the summit, but has since been destroyed. To the south is Pen Bwlch Llandrillo, followed by Cadair Bronwen. It is the highest peak in the Clwydian Range and Dee Valley Area of Outstanding Natural Beauty.
