= Cefn Gwyntog =

Hill (614m) in Powys, Wales

Coordinates: 52°49′38″N 3°31′16″W

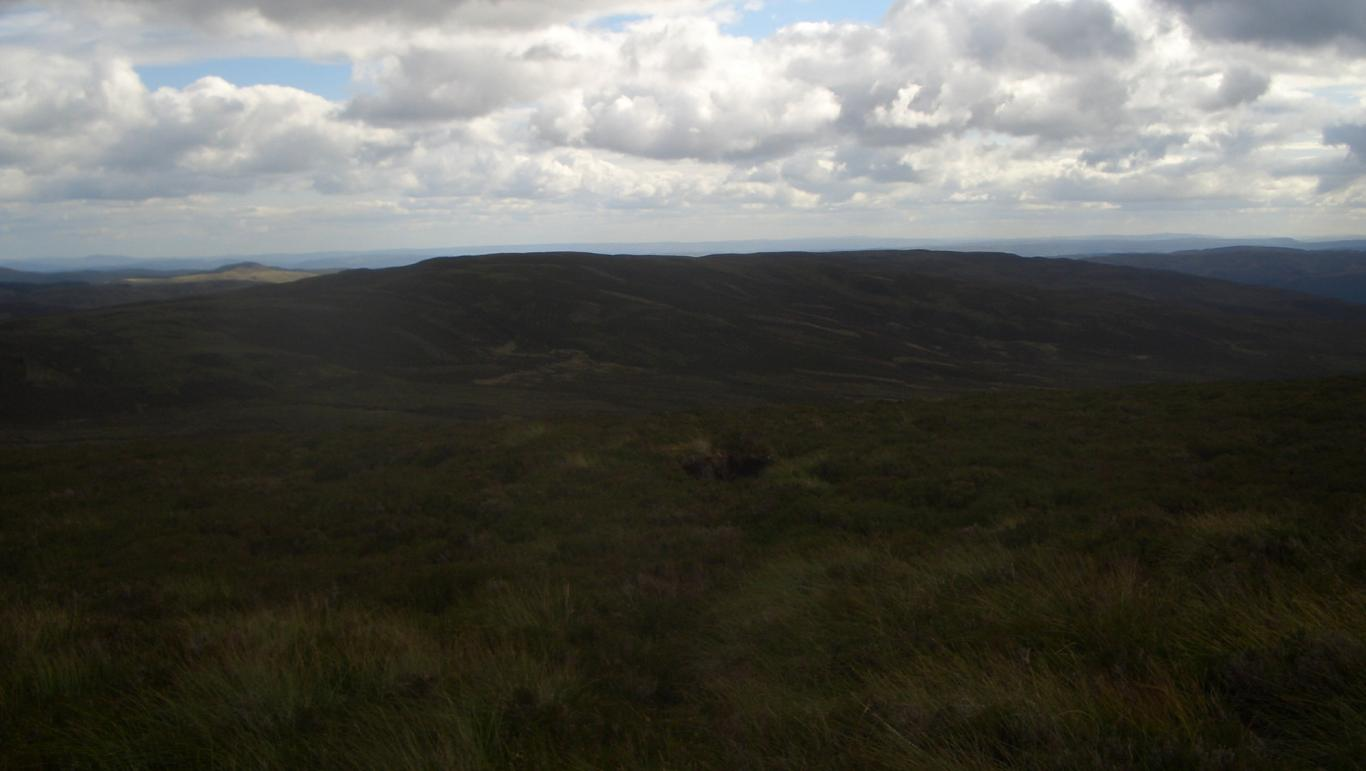
- Cefn Gwyntog from Stac Rhos

Highest point
- Elevation: 615 m (2,018 ft)
- Prominence: 27 m (89 ft)
- Listing: sub Hewitt, Nuttall

Naming
- English translation: windy ridge
- Language of name: Welsh

Geography
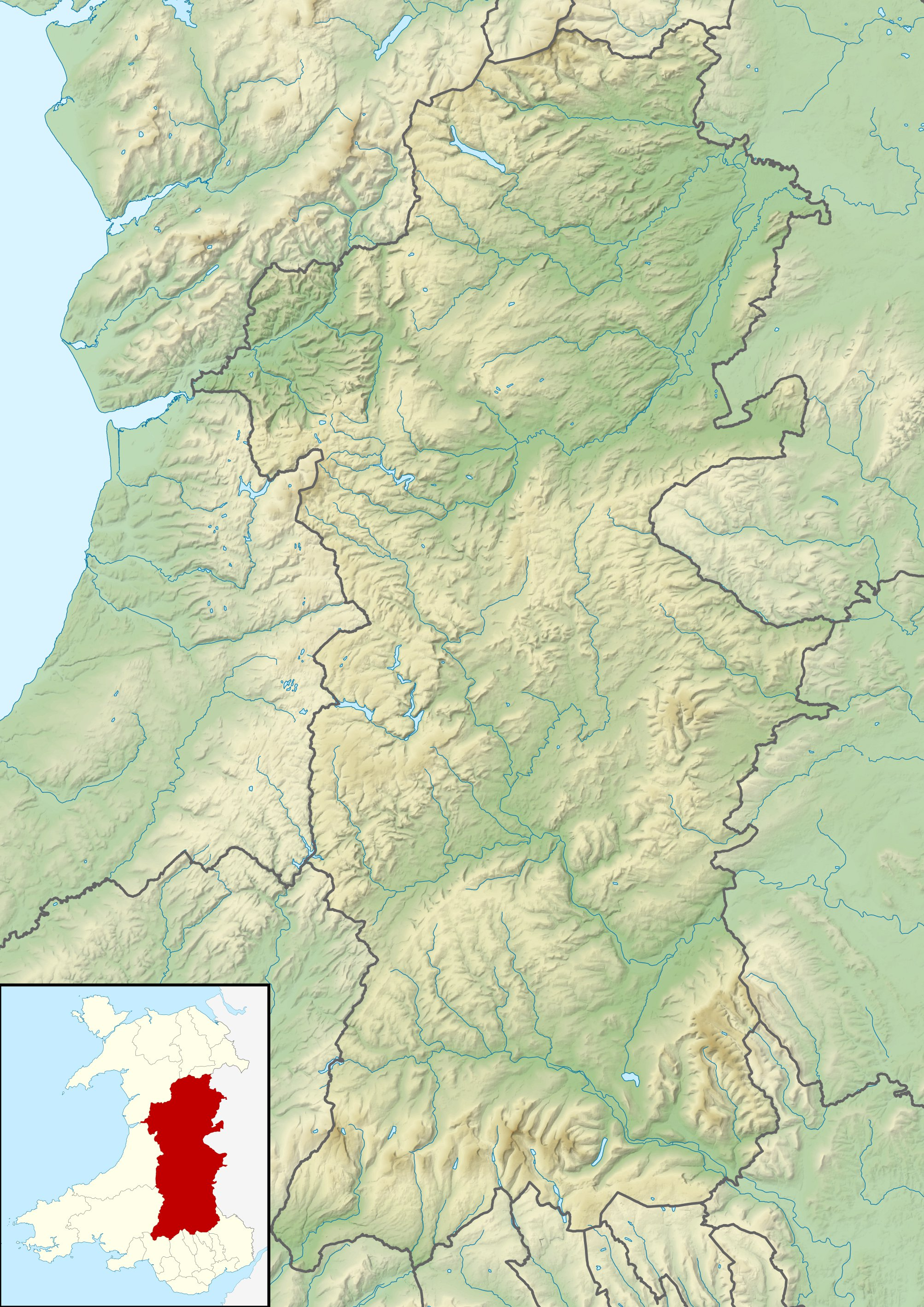
- Location within Powys
- Location: Gwynedd, Wales
- Parent range: Berwyn range
- OS grid: SH 97603 26596
- Topo map: OS Landranger 125

Cefn Gwyntog is a top of Cyrniau Nod in north east Wales. It forms a part of the Berwyn range known as the Hirnantau. Its summit lies just outside the Snowdonia National Park.

The views from the summit are extensive, if unremarkable due to the featureless, flat moorland surroundings. Llyn Efyrnwy (Lake Vyrnwy) can be seen below. The summit is marked by a small cairn surrounded by peat bog and knee deep heather.

Cefn Gwyntog is renowned as one of the hardest summits in Wales to reach, due to its remoteness and hard walking terrain.
