= Cyrniau Nod =

Mountain summit in north east Wales

Coordinates: 52.°50′21″N 3°30′11″W

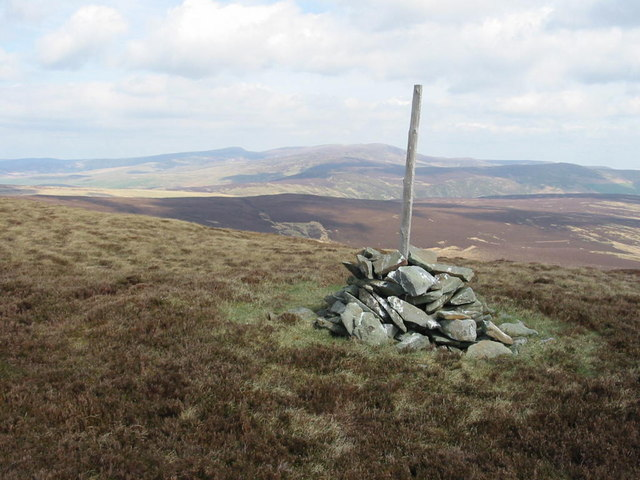
- The summit of Cyrniau Nod with Cadair Berwyn (middle) and Post Gwyn (right) in the distance

Highest point
- Elevation: 666 m (2,185 ft)
- Prominence: 8 m (26 ft)
- Listing: Deleted Marilyn, Hewitt, Nuttall

Naming
- English translation: Mark Cairns
- Language of name: Welsh

Geography
- Location: Powys, Wales
- Parent range: Berwyn range
- OS grid: SH 98847 27918
- Topo map: OS Landranger 125

Listed summits of Cyrniau Nod
Name	Grid ref	Height	Status
Y Groes Fagl	SJ066318	659 metres (2,162 ft)	Nuttall
Foel Cwm Sian Llwyd	SJ066318	648 metres (2,126 ft)	Hewitt, Nuttall
Pen y Boncyn Trefeilw	SJ066318	646 metres (2,119 ft)	Hewitt, Nuttall
Cefn Gwyntog	SJ080317	615 metres (2,018 ft)	sub Hewitt, Nuttall

Cyrniau Nod is a mountain summit in north east Wales. It is a former Marilyn, the Marilyn summit now being the nearby Foel Cedig. Its summit has the Snowdonia National Park boundary running through it. A number of rivers and streams rise from near the mountain including Afon Tanat, Afon Cedig and Nant Ystrad-y-Groes.

The views from the summit are extensive, if unremarkable due to the featureless, flat moorland surroundings. The summit is marked by a small cairn surrounded by peat bog.

Walking on Cyrniau Nod and its tops is made easier by a track that passes close to every top except Cefn Gwyntog. Otherwise, the walking would be tough indeed, requiring tiresome bog crossing for miles.
