= Bryn yr Ŵyn =

Foothill of Plynlimon, Wales

Coordinates: 52.52°N 3.71°W

Bryn yr Ŵyn (Welsh for 'hill of the lambs') is a former Dewey in the foothills of Plynlimon between Aberystwyth and Welshpool in Wales. The summit height is 502 m (1647 ft) and the prominence, or relative height, is 32 metres.
