= Post Gwyn =

Mountain in Powys, Wales

Coordinates: 52°51′13″N 3°24′55″W

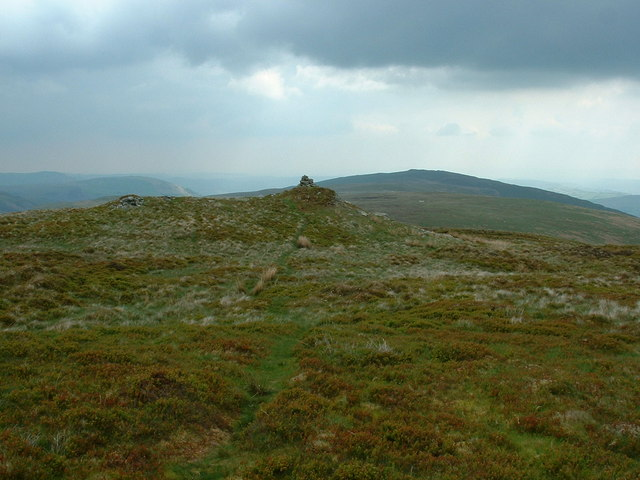

Highest point
- Elevation: 665 m (2,182 ft)
- Prominence: 60 m (200 ft)
- Listing: Hewitt, Nuttall

Naming
- Language of name: Welsh

Geography
- Location: Denbighshire / Powys, Wales
- Parent range: Berwyn range
- OS grid: SJ 04795 29404
- Topo map: OS Landranger 125

Post Gwyn is a subsidiary summit of Cadair Berwyn in north east Wales. It is the western outpost of the main central Berwyn range. The range also includes the Hirnantau to the west, which are crowned by Cyrniau Nod.

The summit is the highest bump on the most westerly of Cadair Berwyn's long south ridges. This ridge has a peat bog covering, with the heather being very deep. No well trodden paths have developed here and the summit is seldom visited.

The summit is marked by a pile of stones and offers views of Cwm Rhiwarth. The south ridge continues towards the summit of Glan-hafon, which at 608m is under 2000 ft.
