= Mynydd y Glyn =

Coordinates: 51.59688°N 3.40035°W

Highest point
- Elevation: 377 m (1,237 ft)
- Prominence: 182 m (597 ft)
- Listing: Marilyn

Geography
- Location: Rhondda Cynon Taff, Wales
- OS grid: ST031896
- Topo map: OS Landranger 170

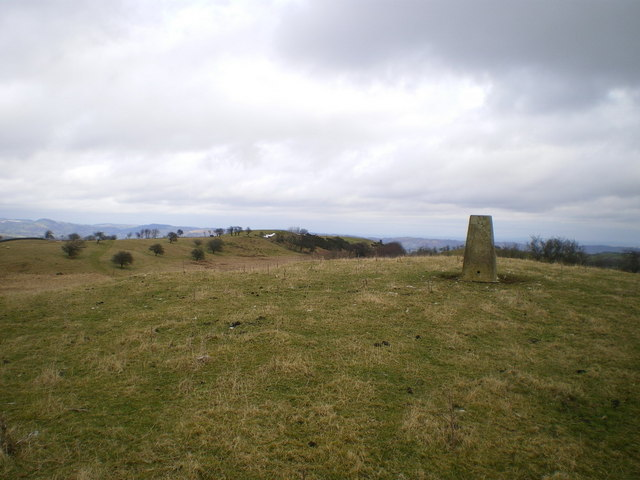
Trig on Mynydd y Glyn Looking ENE from the 389m summit of Mynydd y Glyn towards the hills to the west of Oswestry.

Mynydd y Glyn is a mountain in South Wales, between the towns of Pontypridd and Tonyrefail. It has a height above sea level of 377 metres.

It is the mountain which was used in The Englishman who went up a Hill and came down a Mountain in which Hugh Grant and Ian McNeice star as English cartographers. In the film the mountain is known as 'Ffynnon Garw'.

In the story, set in the First World War years, written by Ifor Christopher and Ivor Monger, Welsh villagers are determined to stop their local mountain being downgraded to a mere "hill". They do this by carrying loads of earth to the top and at the last moment, when the cartographers are due to leave, it reaches the height of 1,002 feet thus qualifying as a mountain. Later, in more modern times, the mountain 'settles' to about 997 feet and the descendants of the original villagers undertake the task again.

The story may be fictional (Christopher Monger says that the story was told to him by his grandfather) but seems to imply that the hill in question is Garth Hill near Taff's Well (Ffynnon Taf in Welsh).
