= Foel Wen =

Mountain in Powys, Wales

Coordinates: 52°53′26″N 3°20′25″W

Highest point
- Elevation: 690.6 m (2,266 ft)
- Prominence: 58.9 m (193 ft)
- Listing: Hewitt, Nuttall

Naming
- English translation: white hill
- Language of name: Welsh

Geography
- Location: Denbighshire / Powys, Wales
- Parent range: Berwyn range
- OS grid: SJ071323
- Topo map: OS Landranger 125

Listed summits of Foel Wen
Name	Grid ref	Height	Status
Foel Wen South Top	SJ066318	687 metres (2,254 ft)	sub Hewitt, Nuttall

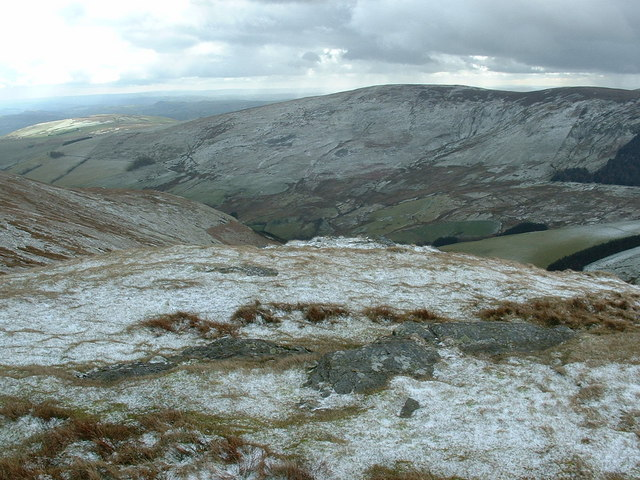
Summit of Foel Wen

Foel Wen (pronounced [ˈvɔil ˈwɛn]) is a subsidiary summit of Cadair Berwyn in north east Wales. It is one of the summits found on the most easterly of Cadair Berwyn's long south ridges.

The summit is grassy, and the entire face of Craig Berwyn can be viewed. To the north lies Tomle, while to the south lies its south top and Mynydd Tarw.
