= Foel Cedig =

Highest point
- Elevation: 667 m (2,188 ft)
- Prominence: 180 m (590 ft)
- Parent peak: Cadair Berwyn
- Listing: Marilyn

Geography
- Location: Snowdonia
- OS grid: SH98173 28331

Foel Cedig is a Marilyn on the Gwynedd/ Powys border in north Wales. In 2018 it replaced Cyrniau Nod as the Marilyn for this area.

It is located a very short distance from Cyrniau Nod. This has led to peak baggers having to recomplete.
