= Cefn Coch =

Hamlet near Llanfair Caereinion in Wales

Coordinates: 52.615°N 3.407°W

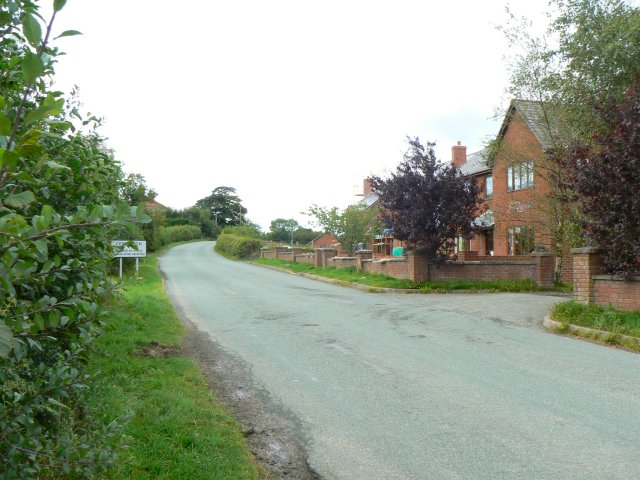
Eastern part of Cefn Coch village

Cefn Coch is a small village or hamlet near Llanfair Caereinion in Mid Wales, located at grid reference SJ 0482 0284. In 2012, the village was chosen as the site for a substation serving several wind farms in the area, causing public outcry.

Cefn Coch (Red Hill) is also the name of a mountain inland from Penmaenmawr in the county of Gwynedd which is known as the site of the so-called Druid's Circle, a Neolithic monument located on the North Wales Pilgrims' Way. The site is of particular note for its stone alignments and subordinate circles and arrangements nearby. The stone circle predates Druids by at least two thousand years but it is entirely likely that the sect held their ceremonies there prior to their defeat at the hands of the Roman army in 60AD in nearby Anglesey.
