= List of Welsh principal areas by highest point =

This is a list of the principal areas of Wales, ordered by their highest points.

Rank	Principal area	Peak	Height (metres)	Grid reference
1	Gwynedd	Snowdon	1085	SH609543
2	Conwy	Carnedd Llewelyn	1064	SH683644
3	Powys	Pen y Fan	886	SO011215
4	Denbighshire	Cadair Berwyn	830	SJ071323
5	Wrexham	Craig Berwyn	790	SJ077335
6	Carmarthenshire	Fan Foel	781	SN821223
7	Ceredigion	Plynlimon	752	SN789869
8	Monmouthshire	Chwarel y Fan	679	SO259292
9	Neath Port Talbot	Craig y Llyn	600	SN906031
10	Rhondda Cynon Taf	Craig y Llyn (eastern slopes)	c. 589	SN909031
11	Blaenau Gwent	Coity Mountain	581	SO231079
12	Torfaen	Coity Mountain (north-eastern slopes)	c. 580	SO231080
13	Bridgend	Mynydd Llangeinwyr	568	SS912947
14	Flintshire	Moel Famau	554	SJ161626
15	Pembrokeshire	Foel Cwmcerwyn	536	SN094311
16	Caerphilly	Twyn Pwll Morlais (SE slopes)	c. 535	SO082110
17	Merthyr Tydfil	Twyn Pwll Morlais (southern slopes)	c. 531	SO080110
18	Swansea	Mynydd y Gwair	374	SN664094
19	Newport	Wentwood	309	ST411942
20	Cardiff	Garth Hill	307	ST103835
21	Isle of Anglesey	Holyhead Mountain	220	SH218829
22	Vale of Glamorgan	Unnamed hill SE of Pantylladron	137	ST036739

== Notes ==
The highest points in the principal areas of both Torfaen and Rhondda Cynon Taf are not summits but locations high on hills, the summits of which are just west of the boundary in neighbouring principal areas. The highest points of the principal areas of Merthyr Tydfil and Caerphilly are not summits either but two locations near to each other on the southern slopes of a higher hill, Cefn yr Ystrad whose summit lies in the adjacent area of Powys.
