= Cadair Bronwen =

Mountain in north Wales

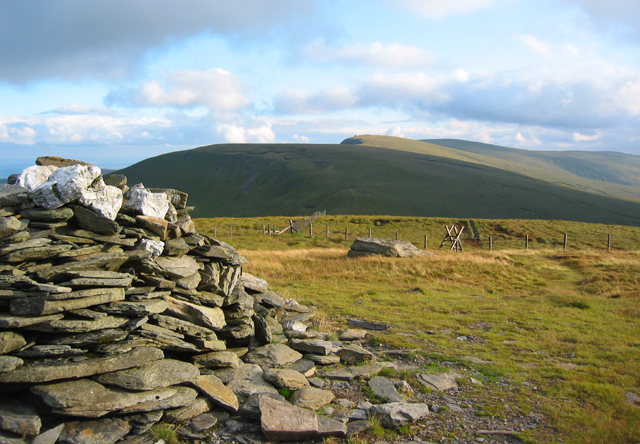
- Cadair Bronwen summit, looking towards Cadair Berwyn

Highest point
- Elevation: 783 m (2,569 ft)
- Prominence: 73 m (240 ft)
- Parent peak: Cadair Berwyn
- Listing: Hewitt, council top, Nuttall
- Coordinates: 52°54′03″N 3°22′25″W

Geography
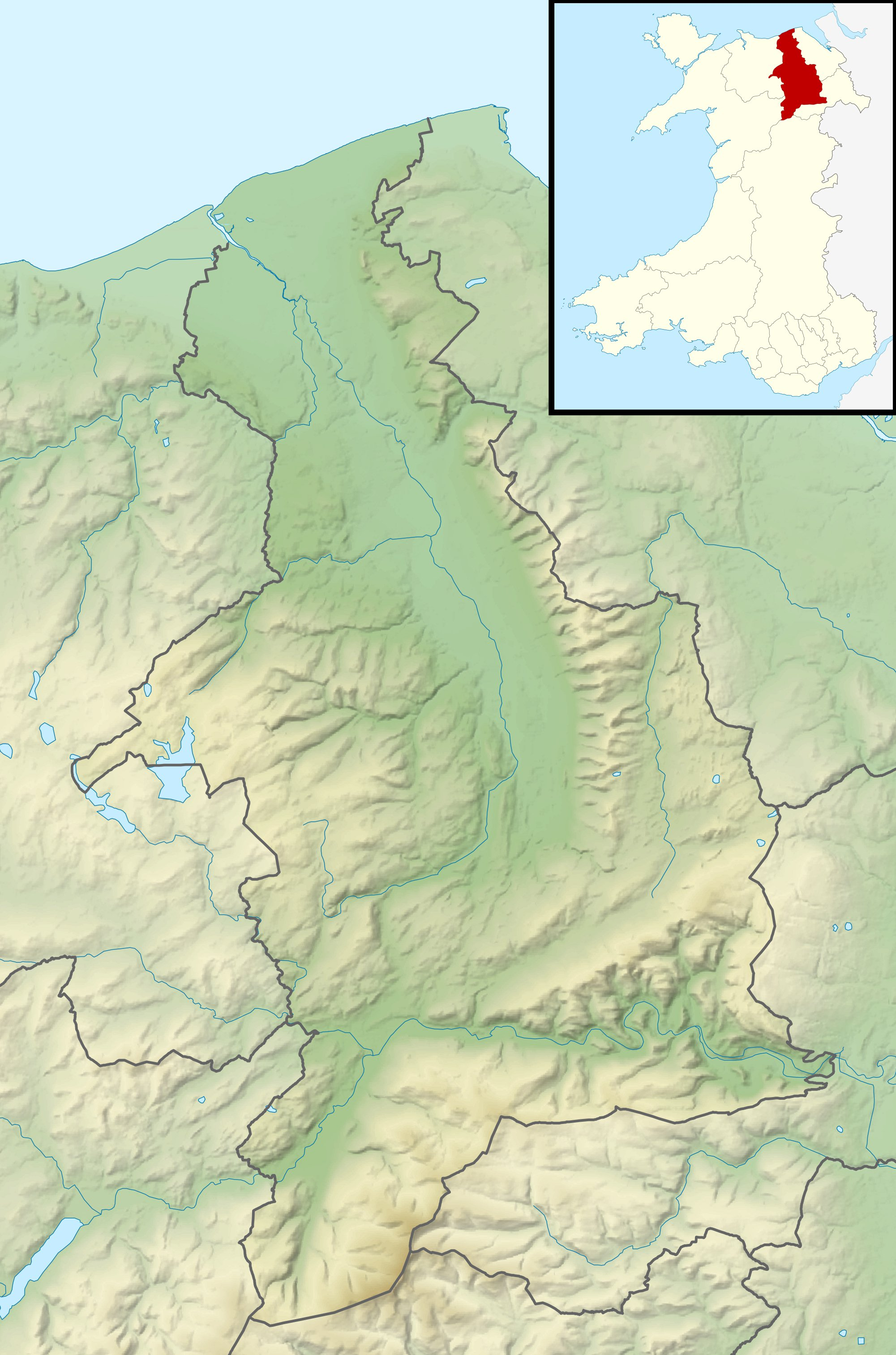
- Location within Denbighshire
- Location: Denbighshire / Wrexham, Wales
- Parent range: Berwyn range
- OS grid: SJ077346
- Topo map: OS Landranger 125

Cadair Bronwen is a mountain in North Wales and forms part of the Berwyn range. To the south are the higher Berwyn summits, including Cadair Berwyn. To the north lies Moel yr Henfaes and Moel Fferna, which top the north end of the Berwyn range. Cadair Bronwen used to be accompanied by a Nuttall top, Cadair Bronwen North-East Top, 700 m (2,300 ft). This top was deleted in 2007 after re-surveying.

Its summit is the highest point in the unitary authority of Wrexham.
