= Moel Sych =

Mountain in Denbighshire, Wales

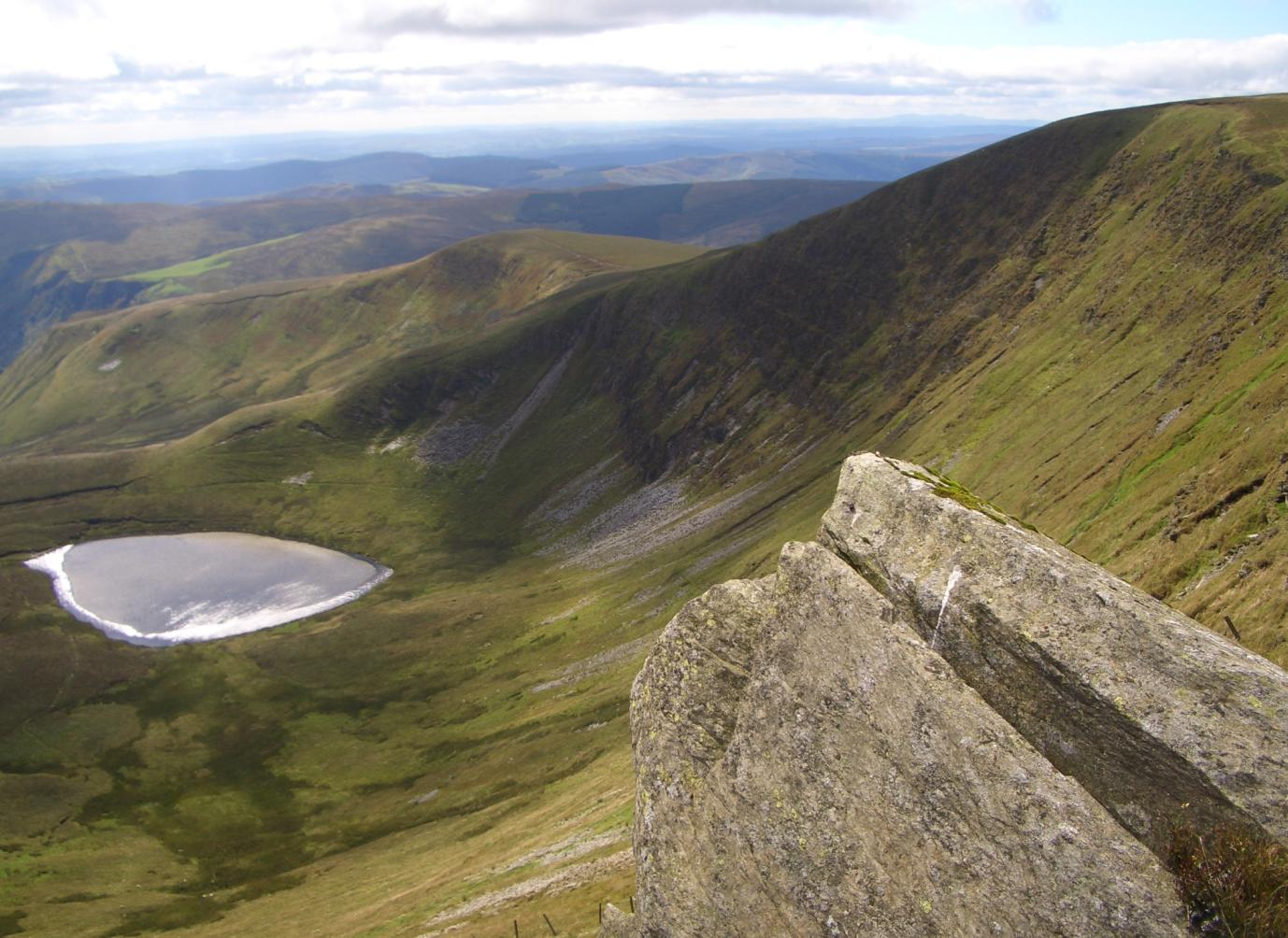
- Moel Sych and Llyn Lluncaws

Highest point
- Elevation: 826.7 m (2,712 ft)
- Prominence: 33.9 m (111 ft)
- Parent peak: Cadair Berwyn
- Listing: Hewitt, Nuttall
- Coordinates: 52°52′34″N 3°23′19″W

Naming
- English translation: dry hill
- Language of name: Welsh

Geography
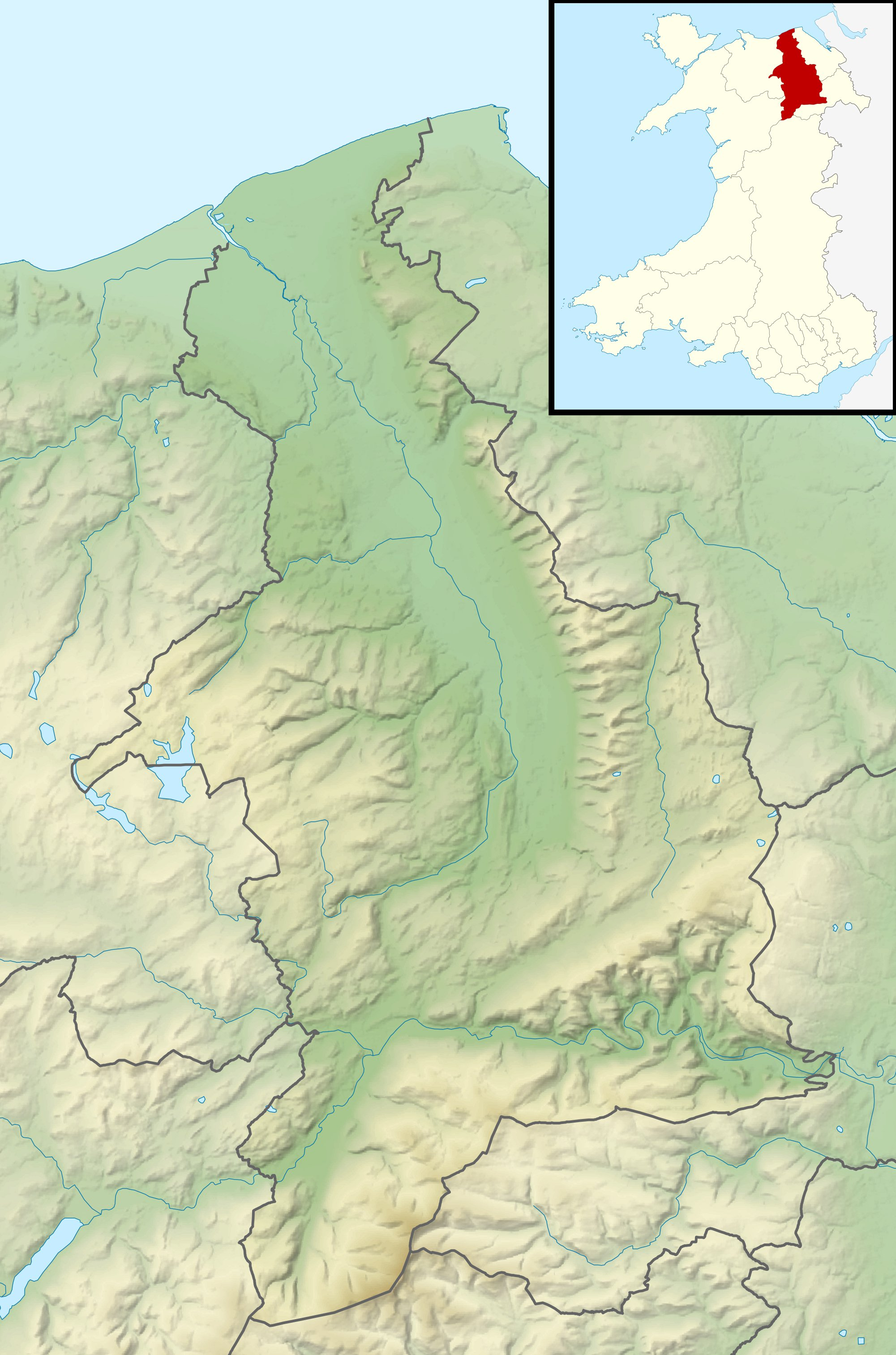
- Location within Denbighshire Location within Wales
- Location: Denbighshire / Powys, Wales
- Parent range: Berwyn range
- OS grid: SJ071323
- Topo map: OS Landranger 125

Moel Sych (pronounced [mɔi̯l sɨːχ]) with a height of 826.7 metres (2,712 ft) is a subsidiary summit of Cadair Berwyn in north east Wales. It is the third highest summit in the Berwyn range after Cadair Berwyn and Cadair Berwyn North Top.

The summit lies at the triple historic county boundary point of Montgomeryshire, Denbighshire and Merionethshire. It is the highest point (historic county top) of Montgomeryshire.

The summit was often considered to be the highest summit in the Berwyns (and therefore the county top of Denbighshire as well as Montgomeryshire) until the Cadair Berwyn North Top, then known as Cadair Berwyn was found to be of the same height. Later on the OS discovered a new top in between the two, which was 5m higher at 832m. This top, now known as Cadair Berwyn, is listed as Cadair Berwyn New Top on the Nuttall list.

The summit has a cairn, and overlooks Llyn Lluncaws in the southern Cwm.

In Welsh mythology, Moel Sych and neighboring Cadair Berwyn are closely associated with the Otherworld. Legend names these peaks as the throne of Gwyn ap Nudd, the King of the Underworld and leader of the Wild Hunt.
