= Cadair Berwyn =

Mountain summit in Powys, Wales

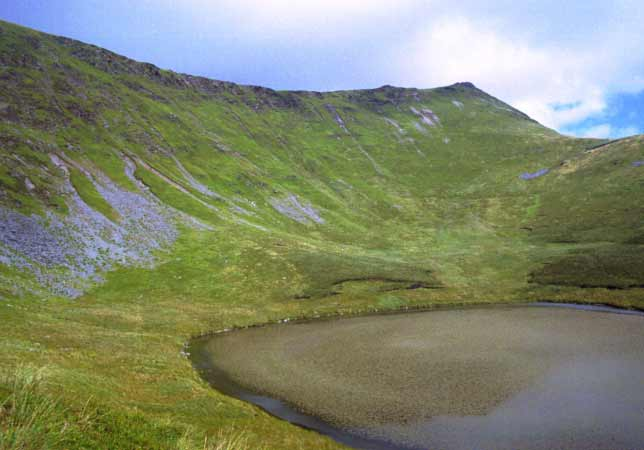
- Cadair Berwyn and Llyn Lluncaws

Highest point
- Elevation: 832 m (2,730 ft)
- Prominence: 346 m (1,135 ft)
- Listing: Marilyn, Hewitt, council top, Nuttall
- Coordinates: 52°52′50″N 3°22′51″W

Naming
- English translation: chair of the white summit
- Language of name: Welsh
- Pronunciation: Welsh: [ˈkadair ˈbɛrwɨn]

Geography
- Location within Wales
- Location: Denbighshire / Powys, Wales
- Parent range: Berwyn range
- OS grid: SJ 07164 32351
- Topo map: OS Landranger 125

Listed summits of Cadair Berwyn
Name	Grid ref	Height	Status
Moel Sych	SJ066318	827 metres (2,713 ft)	Hewitt, Nuttall
Cadair Berwyn North Top	SJ066318	827 metres (2,713 ft)	Nuttall
Cadair Bronwen	SJ066318	785 metres (2,575 ft)	Hewitt, Nuttall
Tomle	SJ085335	742 metres (2,434 ft)	sub Hewitt, Nuttall
Moel yr Ewig	SJ080317	695 metres (2,280 ft)	sub Hewitt, Nuttall
Foel Wen	SJ099334	691 metres (2,267 ft)	Hewitt, Nuttall
Mynydd Tarw	SJ112324	681 metres (2,234 ft)	Hewitt, Nuttall
Godor	SJ094307	679 metres (2,228 ft)	sub Hewitt, Nuttall
Godor North Top	SJ089311	675 metres (2,215 ft)	Nuttall
Post Gwyn	SJ085335	665 metres (2,182 ft)	Hewitt, Nuttall
Moel Fferna	SJ085335	630 metres (2,067 ft)	Hewitt, Nuttall
Pen Bwlch Llandrillo	SJ085335	621 metres (2,037 ft)	Hewitt, Nuttall
Glan-hafon	SJ085335	608 metres (1,995 ft)	sub Hewitt
Pen Bwlch Llandrillo East Top	SJ085335	604 metres (1,982 ft)	sub Hewitt

Cadair Berwyn, Cader Berwyn or Craig Uchaf is a mountain summit in north-east Wales with a height of 832 metres (2,730 ft) above sea level. It is the highest point in the Berwyn range, the highest in North East Wales and the highest significant summit in Wales outside the National Parks. Cadair Berwyn and Foel Cedig to the west are the two Marilyns that form the Berwyn range. The undulating plateau of the range also includes a large number of other summits above 2,000 feet (610 m), including satellite summits of Cadair Berwyn and many which are classed as Nuttalls.

The mountain lies on main ridge of the Berwyns which runs north–south. The eastern side of the ridge is characterised by steep drops and crags including Craig Berwyn north of the summit and Craig y Llyn to the south. Craig y Llyn forms the headwall of a cwm, and it is to this that the word cadair (chair in Welsh) presumably refers. Further north along the ridge is Cadair Bronwen, whilst to south the ridge continues to Moel Sych (Welsh pronunciation: [ˈmɔil ˈsɨːx], meaning 'dry hill').

It is often reported that Moel Sych, 1 kilometre (0.6 mi) along the ridge, is of equal height, but Cadair Berwyn's spot height on the Ordnance Survey maps, where the trig point stands, is not the true summit. Cadair Berwyn's summit, 200 metres (220 yd) south of the trig point, is 5 metres (16 ft) taller than Moel Sych. This summit is listed as Cadair Berwyn New Top on the Nuttall list. However, the name given to it by its discoverer, Bernard Wright, was Craig Uchaf.

In 1987 Bernard Wright, a rambler from Cheshire, was standing on Cadair Berwyn North Top (then said to be the highest mountain in Clwyd) when he noticed that a nearby peak appeared to be higher. After first denying it, the cartographers at the Ordnance Survey finally admitted that Bernard had discovered a 'new mountain' at 830 metres above sea level. Bernard's name for this peak was Craig Uchaf (highest rock) the topographical name fitting in well with those that the Welsh have been giving their landscape for centuries. Near the summit is a Bronze Age cairn. In 2014, accurate re-surveying using GPS by Myrddyn Phillips added an additional 2 metres to the height. Phillips uses the name Craig Berwyn rather than Cadair Berwyn for this summit.

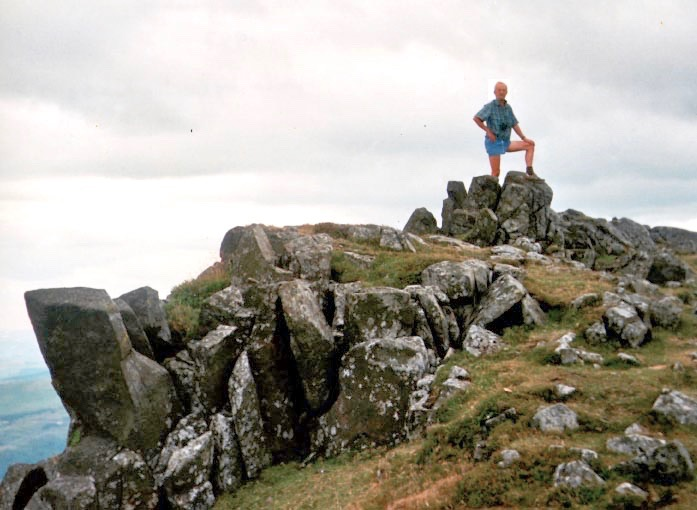
Bernard Wright, discoverer of the summit, on Craig Uchaf

Several other summits in the area are listed as Hewitts or Nuttalls, including Foel Wen ([ˈvɔil ˈwɛn], Welsh for white hill) and Mynydd Tarw ([ˈmɐnɨð ˈtæɾu], bull mountain).

Cadair Berwyn is the highest point (county top) of the historic county of Denbighshire. The historic border with Merionethshire also ran through the summit. Moel Sych and Cadair Berwyn North Top had been thought at one time to have been the joint county tops of Denbighshire, but resurveying demoted them as explained previously. In terms of modern administrative units, the summit lies entirely within the Powys council area, though the border with modern Denbighshire council runs very close (about 150 metres (490 ft) to the northwest - the new boundary does not exactly follow the old county boundary). The historic county of Denbighshire lies on the eastern side on the main Berwyn ridge, but the modern council lies on the western side. The northern end of the main ridge (Craig Berwyn on the OS map, 790 metres (2,590 ft) height, 1 kilometre (0.62 mi) north of Cadair Berwyn North Top) is the highest point in Wrexham county borough.

Cadair Berwyn stands between Snowdon and the Wrekin and blocks their line-of-sight. The view from the summit on a clear day is extensive and includes Snowdon, Cadair Idris, Brecon Beacons, Shropshire Hills, Peak District, Yorkshire Dales, Lake District and the Isle of Man. The peak is the nearest high mountain to a significant fraction of the population of the English Midlands but sees far fewer walkers than equivalent summits in the Lake District and Snowdonia.

There is a standing stone in the area, located near the summit between Cadair Berwyn and Tomle. This was re-erected in June 2008 by High Sports. The standing stone can be found at SJ080337.

Below the mountain is a small lake, Llyn Lluncaws set in a glacial cirque.

On 11 August 1942, a United States Army Air Forces, Boeing B-17E Flying Fortress flying from RAF Polebrook to RAF Burtonwood crashed into the side of Cadair Berwyn resulting in the deaths of all eleven passengers and crew.

It is the location, as well as Cadair Bronwen, of an alleged UFO landing in 1974, known as the Berwyn Mountain UFO incident.

== Panorama of England ==
As the northeasternmost major peak in Wales, Cadair Berwyn has lines of sight to more parts of England than any other Welsh mountain. The following principal hills can be seen on the horizon in perfect conditions (distances in miles): Black Combe (95), Pillar (112), Crag Hill (117), Kirk Fell (111), Scafell (109), Scafell Pike (109), Bowfell (109), Crinkle Crags (108), Dow Crag (104), Coniston Old Man (104), Wetherlam (106), Helvellyn (115), Fairfield (113), Red Screes (112), Stony Cove Pike (113), High Street (114), Harter Fell (113), Grayrigg Forest (109), The Calf (109), Ward's Stone (85), Fair Snape Fell (79), White Hill (87), Dodd Fell Hill (106), Penyghent (100), Fountains Fell (100), Rye Loaf Hill (95), Pendle Hill (82), Winter Hill (63), Bull Hill (69), Boulsworth Hill (83), Hail Storm Hill (72), Freeholds Top (76), Blackstone Edge (77), Black Hill (77), Bleaklow (75), Kinder Scout (72), Lord's Seat (72), Shining Tor (63), Axe Edge Moor (64), Oliver Hill (63), The Roaches (61), Merryton Low (63), Ipstones Edge (62), Weaver Hills (64), Charnwood Forest (87), Cannock Chase (60), Barr Beacon (65), The Wrekin (38), Turners Hill (62), Walton Hill (63), Sheepwalks Hill (54), Brown Clee Hill (43), Titterstone Clee Hill (47), Long Mynd (32), Stiperstones (28), Heath Mynd (29), High Vinnalls (45), Burrow (36), Black Hill (37), Hergest Ridge (49)
