= Berwyn range =

Moorland and hill range in Wales

Location of Berwyn Mountains, Wales.

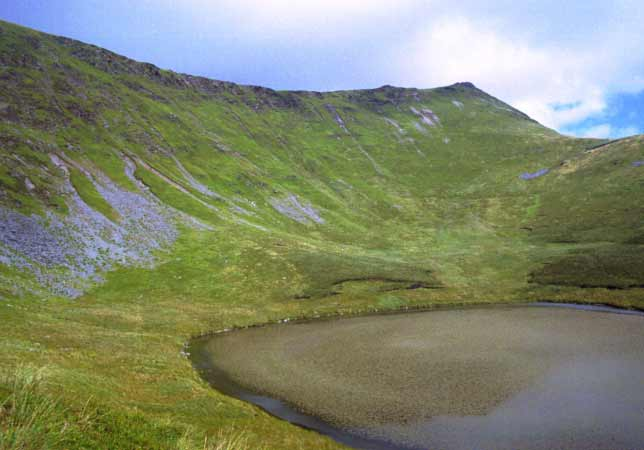
Cadair Berwyn, with Llyn Lluncaws in the foreground

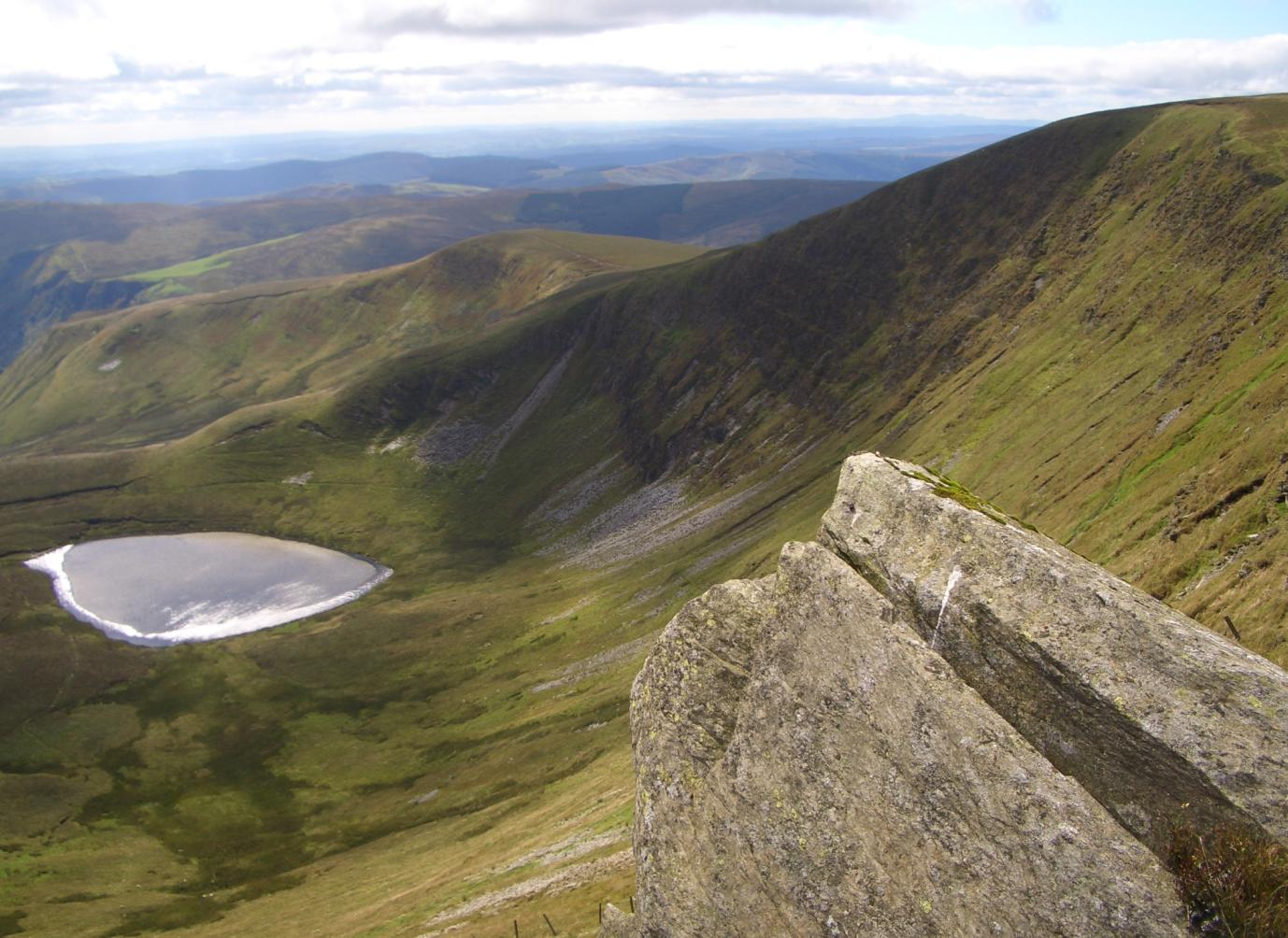
Summit of Moel Sych

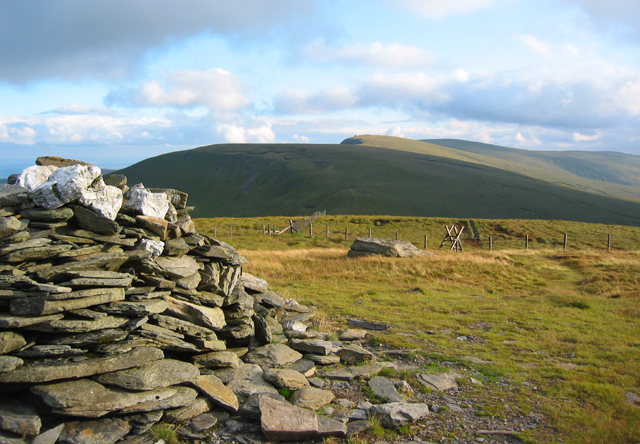
Summit of Cadair Bronwen, looking towards Cadair Berwyn

The Berwyn range (Welsh: Y Berwyn or Mynydd y Berwyn) is an isolated and sparsely populated area of moorland in the northeast of Wales, roughly bounded by Llangollen in the northeast, Corwen in the northwest, Bala in the southwest, and Oswestry in the southeast.

== Description ==
The area is wild and largely vegetated by heather about one metre thick, with some acidic grassland and bracken. It is not very popular for hill-walking or scrambling since the peaks are lower than those in nearby Snowdonia. However, the topmost peaks are rugged and have a distinctive character. Nearby towns include Llangollen and Corwen, which are popular tourist destinations.

The main summits are Cadair Berwyn at 832 metres (2,730 ft) above sea level, Moel Sych at 827 metres (2,713 ft) and Cadair Bronwen at 783 metres (2,569 ft) above sea level. The Berwyn range is crossed to the southwest by the B4391 Milltir Cerrig mountain pass at an elevation of 486 metres (1,594 ft).

Cadair Berwyn is the highest point in the Berwyn range, and the highest point in Wales outside the National Parks. Cadair Bronwen and Foel Cedig to the west are the two Marilyns that form the Berwyn range.

The mountain lies on main ridge of the Berwyn range which runs north–south. The eastern side of the ridge is characterised by steep drops and crags including Craig Berwyn north of the summit and Craig y Llyn to the south. Craig y Llyn forms the headwall of a cwm, and it is to this that the word cadair (chair in Welsh) presumably refers. Further north along the ridge is Cadair Bronwen, whilst to south the ridge continues to Moel Sych (Welsh pronunciation: [ˈmɔil ˈsɨːx], meaning "dry hill").

It is often reported that Moel Sych, 1 kilometre (5/8 mi) along the ridge, is of equal height, but Cadair Berwyn's spot height on the Ordnance Survey maps, where the trig point stands, is not the true summit. Cadair Berwyn's summit, 200 metres (220 yd) south of the trig point, is three metres taller than Moel Sych. This summit is listed as Cadair Berwyn New Top on the Nuttall list.

Several other summits in the area are listed as Hewitts or Nuttalls, including Foel Wen ([ˈvɔil ˈwɛn], Welsh for white hill) and Mynydd Tarw ([ˈmɐnɨð ˈtæɾu], bull mountain).

The summit lies on the border between Powys and Denbighshire, and is the highest point in Denbighshire. The northern end of Craig Berwyn is the highest point in Wrexham County Borough.

== History ==
There is a standing stone at SJ080337 near the summit between Cadair Berwyn and Tomle. It was re-erected in June 2008 by High Sports.

The Berwyn range also played its part in causing King Henry II of England to turn back during his invasion of Gwynedd in 1165. Rather than taking the usual route along the northern coastal plain, his army invaded from Oswestry and took a route over the Berwyns. The English invasion faced an alliance of Welsh princes led by King Owain Gwynedd, but there was little fighting – endless days of heavy rain forced the English to retreat.

== Alleged UFO crash ==
At 8.38 pm on 23 January 1974, an earthquake of magnitude 3.5 was felt over a wide area of north Wales and as far as Liverpool. Since earthquakes are uncommon in the UK, it was not generally recognized for what it was, and since a number of unusual lights in the sky had been observed the same evening, it was considered possible that an aircraft had crashed, or a meteorite had impacted. Further confusion was caused by lights seen on the Berwyn Mountains, which subsequently turned out to have belonged to poachers.

== Ecology ==
The area supports substantial populations of upland birds including raptors, such as the hen harrier (Circus cyaneus), merlin (Falco columbarius), and peregrine (Falco peregrinus) (about 14–18 breeding pairs of each species, 1%–2% of the total British population), and for this reason it is a Special Protection Area classified in accordance with the European Union's Birds Directive. Much of the area is also designated a national nature reserve and a Site of Special Scientific Interest and forms part of the Berwyn and South Clwyd Mountains Special Area of Conservation. Other wildlife include short-eared owl, raven, buzzard, polecat and golden plover.

== Etymology ==
The scholar T. Gwynn Jones suggested that a possible origin of the term "Berwyn" was "Bryn(iau) Gwyn (ap Nudd)", where the Middle Welsh word "bre" (hill) had mutated to Ber + Gwyn, Gwyn ap Nudd being the mythological King of the Tylwyth Teg (Fair Folk, or fairies). A more likely etymology is "bar" (summit, crest) + "gwyn" (white), with the "a" in "bar" showing i-affection as a result of the "y" in "gwyn", therefore changing from "a" to "e"; the word also shows soft mutation of the letter "g" (which is deleted under soft mutation).

== Peaks ==
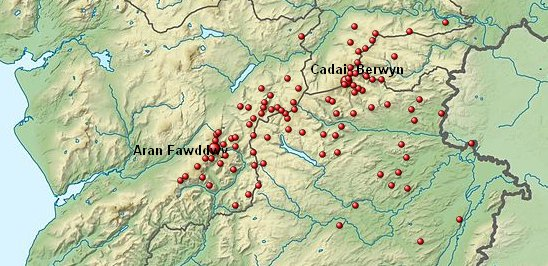
Bala, Gwynedd to Welshpool

Between Bala and Welshpool
Name of Peak	OS coordinates	Geographical coordinates
Allt y Gader	SJ149176	52.749°N, 3.262°W
Allt y Main	SJ162151	52.727°N, 3.242°W
Bryn Du	SJ145360	52.914°N, 3.272°W
Bryn Gwyn	SJ042295	52.854°N, 3.424°W
Bryn-llus	SJ085408	52.956°N, 3.363°W
Cadair Berwyn	SJ071323	52.880°N, 3.381°W
Cadair Berwyn (N top)	SJ072327	52.883°N, 3.380°W
Cadair Bronwen	SJ077346	52.900°N, 3.373°W
Cadair Bronwen (NE top)	SJ087352	52.906°N, 3.358°W
Carnedd Das Eithin	SJ051238	52.803°N, 3.409°W
Cefn Coch	SH923266	52.826°N, 3.599°W
Cefn Gwyntog	SH976265	52.826°N, 3.521°W
Cefn Gwyntog (N top)	SH975274	52.834°N, 3.522°W
Cerrig Coediog	SJ113386	52.937°N, 3.321°W
Craig Berwyn	SJ077335	52.891°N, 3.373°W
Craig Rhiwarth	SJ054271	52.833°N, 3.405°W
Croes y Forwyn	SJ029210	52.777°N, 3.440°W
Cyrniau	SJ062251	52.815°N, 3.393°W
Cyrniau Nod	SH988279	52.839°N, 3.503°W
Cyrniau y Llyn	SJ000244	52.807°N, 3.484°W
Ffordd Gefn (Bryn Gwyn)	SJ033240	52.804°N, 3.435°W
Foel Cwm Siân Llwyd	SH995313	52.869°N, 3.494°W
Foel Dugoed	SH893131	52.704°N, 3.639°W
Foel Figenau	SH916284	52.842°N, 3.610°W
Foel Goch (Berwyn)	SH943290	52.848°N, 3.570°W
Foel Tyn-y-fron	SH918257	52.817°N, 3.606°W
Foel Wen	SJ099333	52.889°N, 3.340°W
Foel Wen (S peak)	SJ102330	52.886°N, 3.336°W
Foel y Geifr	SH937275	52.834°N, 3.579°W
Gallt y Goedhwch	SJ137159	52.733°N, 3.279°W
Glan Hafon	SJ080272	52.834°N, 3.367°W
Godor	SJ094307	52.866°N, 3.347°W
Godor (N top)	SJ089311	52.869°N, 3.354°W
Gyrn Moelfre	SJ184293	52.854°N, 3.213°W
Jericho Hill	SJ162202	52.772°N, 3.243°W
Llanymynech Hill	SJ263221	52.791°N, 3.094°W
Lledwyn Mawr	SH905287	52.844°N, 3.627°W
Moel Bentyrch	SJ055095	52.674°N, 3.399°W
Moel Cae-howel	SH978330	52.884°N, 3.520°W
Moel Fferna	SJ116397	52.947°N, 3.317°W
Moel Hen-fache	SJ109281	52.843°N, 3.324°W
Moel Poethion	SJ082306	52.865°N, 3.365°W
Moel Sych	SJ066318	52.875°N, 3.389°W
Moel y Fronllwyd	SJ121176	52.748°N, 3.303°W
Moel y Gwelltyn	SJ170277	52.840°N, 3.233°W
Moel yr Ewig	SJ080317	52.874°N, 3.368°W
Moel yr Henfaes	SJ077385	52.935°N, 3.374°W
Moel yr Henfaes (Pen Bwlch Llandrillo peak)	SJ089369	52.921°N, 3.356°W
Moel yr Henfaes (W peak)	SJ099374	52.926°N, 3.341°W
Mynydd Feifod	SJ169400	52.950°N, 3.238°W
Mynydd Mawr	SJ132286	52.847°N, 3.290°W
Mynydd Mynyllod	SJ002395	52.943°N, 3.486°W
Mynydd Tarw	SJ112324	52.881°N, 3.321°W
Mynydd y Bryn	SJ217268	52.833°N, 3.163°W
Mynydd y Glyn	SJ153222	52.790°N, 3.257°W
Mynydd-y-briw	SJ174260	52.825°N, 3.227°W
Pen y Berth	SJ081127	52.704°N, 3.361°W
Pen y Boncyn Trefeilw	SH962283	52.842°N, 3.542°W
Pen y Cerrig Duon	SH953281	52.840°N, 3.555°W
Pen-y-coed	SJ226414	52.964°N, 3.153°W
Post Gwyn	SJ048293	52.852°N, 3.415°W
Rhialgwm	SJ055211	52.779°N, 3.402°W
Rhiwaedog-uwch-afon	SH938313	52.868°N, 3.579°W
Rhos	SJ125323	52.881°N, 3.301°W
Rhwng y Ddwynant	SH978248	52.811°N, 3.517°W
Stac Rhos	SH969279	52.838°N, 3.532°W
Tir Rhiwiog	SH929162	52.732°N, 3.587°W
Tomle	SJ085335	52.891°N, 3.361°W
Trum y Gwrgedd	SH941284	52.842°N, 3.573°W
Y Golfa	SJ182070	52.654°N, 3.210°W
Y Groes Fagl	SH988290	52.848°N, 3.504°W
Yr Allt	SJ242102	52.684°N, 3.122°W
