= Godor =

Hill in Powys, Wales

Coordinates: 52°52′0″N 3°20′49″W

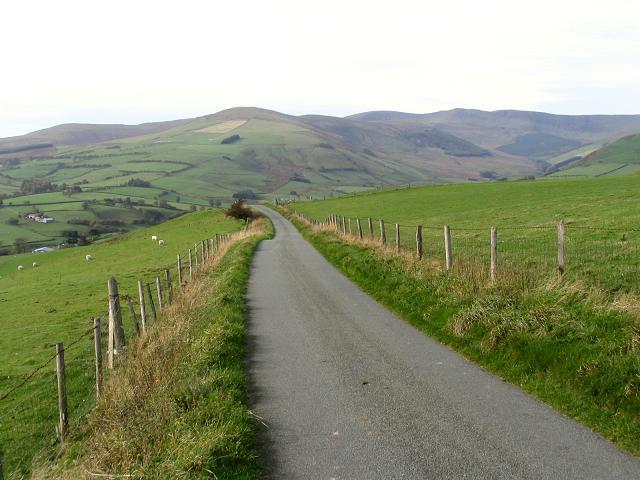
- Looking towards the Godor in the middle and the Berwyns mountains on the right

Highest point
- Elevation: 679 m (2,228 ft)
- Prominence: 25 m (82 ft)
- Listing: sub Hewitt, Nuttall

Naming
- Language of name: Welsh

Geography
- Location within Wales
- Location: Denbighshire / Powys, Wales
- Parent range: Berwyn range
- OS grid: SJ 09424 30748
- Topo map: OS Landranger 125

Godor is a top of Cadair Berwyn in north east Wales. It lies as the last summit on a boggy ridge heading south from Cadair Berwyn's summit. The summits of Tomle and Godor North Top are also to be found on the ridge.

The summit is grassy, marked by a small cairn.
