= Pen Bwlch Llandrillo =

Mountain in north Wales

Coordinates: 52.92218°N 3.35582°W

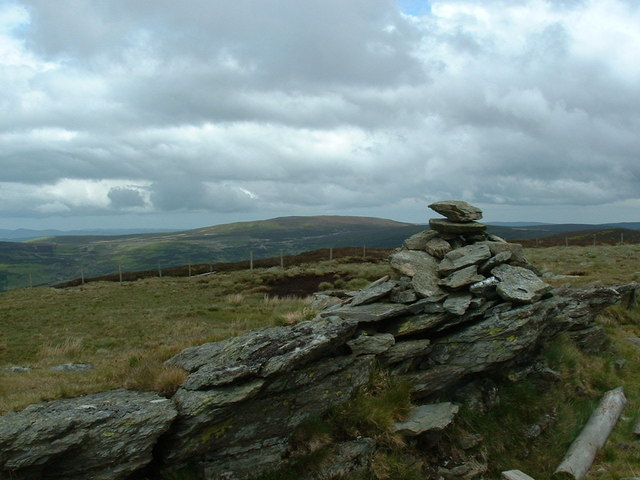
- Moel yr Henfaes summit, looking towards Moel Fferna

Highest point
- Elevation: 621 m (2,037 ft)
- Prominence: 35 m (115 ft)
- Listing: Hewitt, Nuttall

Geography
- Location: Denbighshire / Wrexham, Wales
- Parent range: Berwyn range
- OS grid: SJ089369
- Topo map: OS Landranger 125

Moel yr Henfaes, also listed by the Nuttall's as Pen Bwlch Llandrillo Top and sometimes known as Moel yr Henfaes, is a mountain in North Wales and forms part of the Berwyn range.

To the south are the higher Berwyn summits, including Cadair Berwyn. To the north lies Moel Fferna. The summit crowns an area of deep heather moorland and is located on a small rocky outcrop, marked by a pile of stones.
