= Bwlch (disambiguation) =

Bwlch is a village in Wales. Bwlch means a pass in Welsh and may also refer to

- A4061 road (locally called Bwlch y Clawdd)
- Bwlch Penbarras, a mountain pass in north-east Wales
- Bwlchygroes, a village in Pembrokeshire
- Bwlch y Groes, a public road mountain pass
- Bwlch y Ddwyallt, a high point of the plateau of Gwaun Cerrig Llwydion
- Bwlch-y-Ddeufaen, a mountain pass in Conwy county borough
- Bwlch Mawr, a hill in Gwynedd
- Cors Bwlch-y-baedd, a Site of Special Scientific Interest in Ceredigion
- Fan Bwlch Chwyth, a peak in Powys
- Pen Bwlch Llandrillo, a mountain
- Rhos Bwlch-y-rhandir, a Site of Special Scientific Interest in Ceredigion
- Tan-y-Bwlch (disambiguation)
