= List of mountain passes of Wales =

The following is a list of notable mountain passes in Wales:

| Pass name | Translation/alt. name | Road number | OS grid ref of summit | Historic county | Principal area | National Park? | Maximum Elevation(m) | Notes |
|---|---|---|---|---|---|---|---|---|
| Aberglaslyn Pass | | A498 | SH595465 | Caernarfonshire | Gwynedd | Snowdonia | | |
| Bwlch Bryn-rhudd | English: pass of the crimson hill | A4067 between Defynnog and Abercraf | SN870219 | Brecknockshire | Powys | Brecon Beacons | | |
| Bwlch Cerrig Duon | English: pass of the black stones | minor road between Trecastle and Swansea Valley | SN857227 | Brecknockshire | Powys | Brecon Beacons | 369m | |
| Bwlch y Cloddiau | a.k.a. 'the Mohican Road' | right of way between Llangurig and Cwmystwyth | SN854782 | Montgomeryshire | Powys | | 533m | Right of way. Eastern approach paved road; western approach largely unpaved. |
| Bwlch y Fedwen | | A458 between Mallwyd and Llangadfan | SH752135 | Montgomeryshire | Powys | | | |
| Bwlch Esgair Gelli | | road between Abergwesyn and Tregaron | SN784576 | Cardiganshire | Ceredigion | | 472m | |
| Bwlch ar y Fan | a.k.a. the Gap Road | restricted byway between Pontsticill and Brecon | SO032205 | Brecknockshire | Powys | Brecon Beacons | 599m | Rocky track over the pass. |
| Bwlchgylfin | | B4418 between Rhyd Ddu and Dyffryn Nantlle | SH555534 | Caernarfonshire | Gwynedd | Snowdonia | 236m | |
| Bwlch Llyn Bach | English: pass of the small lake | A487 between Dolgellau and Corris | SH752135 | Merionethshire | Gwynedd | Snowdonia | 285m | |
| Bwlch Oerddrws | | A470 between Dolgellau and Dinas Mawddwy | SH802170 | Merionethshire | Gwynedd | Snowdonia | 363m | |
| Bwlch y Parc | | A494 between Mold and Vale of Clwyd | SJ164582 | Denbighshire | Denbighshire | | 291m | through the Clwydian Range |
| Bwlch Penbarras | a.k.a. 'Old Bwlch' | minor road between Tafarn-y-Gelyn and Llanbedr-Dyffryn-Clwyd | SJ162605 | Denbighshire | Denbighshire | | 362m | through the Clwydian Range |
| Bwlch Pen-y-feidiog | a.k.a. 'The Gated Road' | minor road between Llanuwchllyn and Bronaber | SH784333 | Merionethshire | Gwynedd | Snowdonia | 531m | |
| Bwlch-y-Ddeufaen | English translation: pass of the two stones | minor road/track between Abergwyngregyn and Vale of Conwy | SH712718 | Caernarfonshire | Gwynedd | Snowdonia | 429m | |
| Crimea Pass | Welsh: Bwlch y Gorddinan | A470 | SH699485 | Caernarfonshire & Merionethshire | Gwynedd | Snowdonia | 385m | |
| Bwlch y Groes | English translation: pass of the cross Commonly known as Hellfire Pass | minor road between Llanuwchllyn and Dinas Mawddwy | SH913233 | Merionethshire | Gwynedd | Snowdonia | 545m | Highest paved pass in North Wales. |
| Gospel Pass | Welsh: Bwlch yr Efengyl | minor road from Hay-on-Wye to Vale of Ewyas | SO236352 | Brecknockshire | Powys | Brecon Beacons | 549m | Highest paved pass in Wales. |
| Horseshoe Pass | Welsh: Bwlch yr Oernant (pass of the cold stream) | A542 | SJ195474 | Denbighshire | Denbighshire | | 417m | |
| Milltir Gerrig | English translation: mile of stones | B4391 between Llangynog and Bala | SJ 017305 | Merionethshire | Gwynedd | Snowdonia | 486m | |
| Nant Ffrancon Pass | | A5 between Bethesda, Gwynedd, and Llyn Ogwen in Conwy | SN649605 | Caernarfonshire | Gwynedd | Snowdonia | 312m | |
| Pengenffordd | | A470 between Talgarth and Vale of Usk | SO173300 | Brecknockshire | Powys | Brecon Beacons | | |
| Pen-y-Pass | English: Llanberis Pass | A4086 | SH646556 | Caernarfonshire | Gwynedd | Snowdonia | 359m | |
| Pen Rhiw-wen | | A4069 between Llangadog and Brynaman | SN732184 | Carmarthenshire | Carmarthenshire | Brecon Beacons | | |
| Rhiw Fawr | English: Forge Road | minor road between Machynlleth and Staylittle | SN837884 | Montgomeryshire | Powys | | 509m | |
| Pen Bwlch Llandrillo | | Drovers road between Llanarmon Dyffryn-Ceiriog and Llandrillo/Cynwyd | SJ091365 | Merionethshire | Denbighshire | | 580m | Unpaved drovers road over the pass. |
| Storey Arms | | A470 between Brecon and Merthyr Tydfil | SN983203 | Brecknockshire | Powys | Brecon Beacons | 435m | |
| Sychnant Pass | Welsh: Bwlch Sychnant (dry stream pass) | minor road between Dwygyfylchi and Conwy | SH750770 | Caernarfonshire | Conwy | | 158m | |
| Torpantau | | minor road from Talybont-on-Usk to Pontsticill | SO052172 | Brecknockshire | Powys | Brecon Beacons | | |
| Bwlch Bryn-rhudd | | A4067 | SN870195 | Brecknockshire | Powys | Brecon Beacons | | |
