= Foel Rhudd =

Hill (659m) in Gwynedd, Wales

Coordinates: 52°48′7″N 3°38′22″W

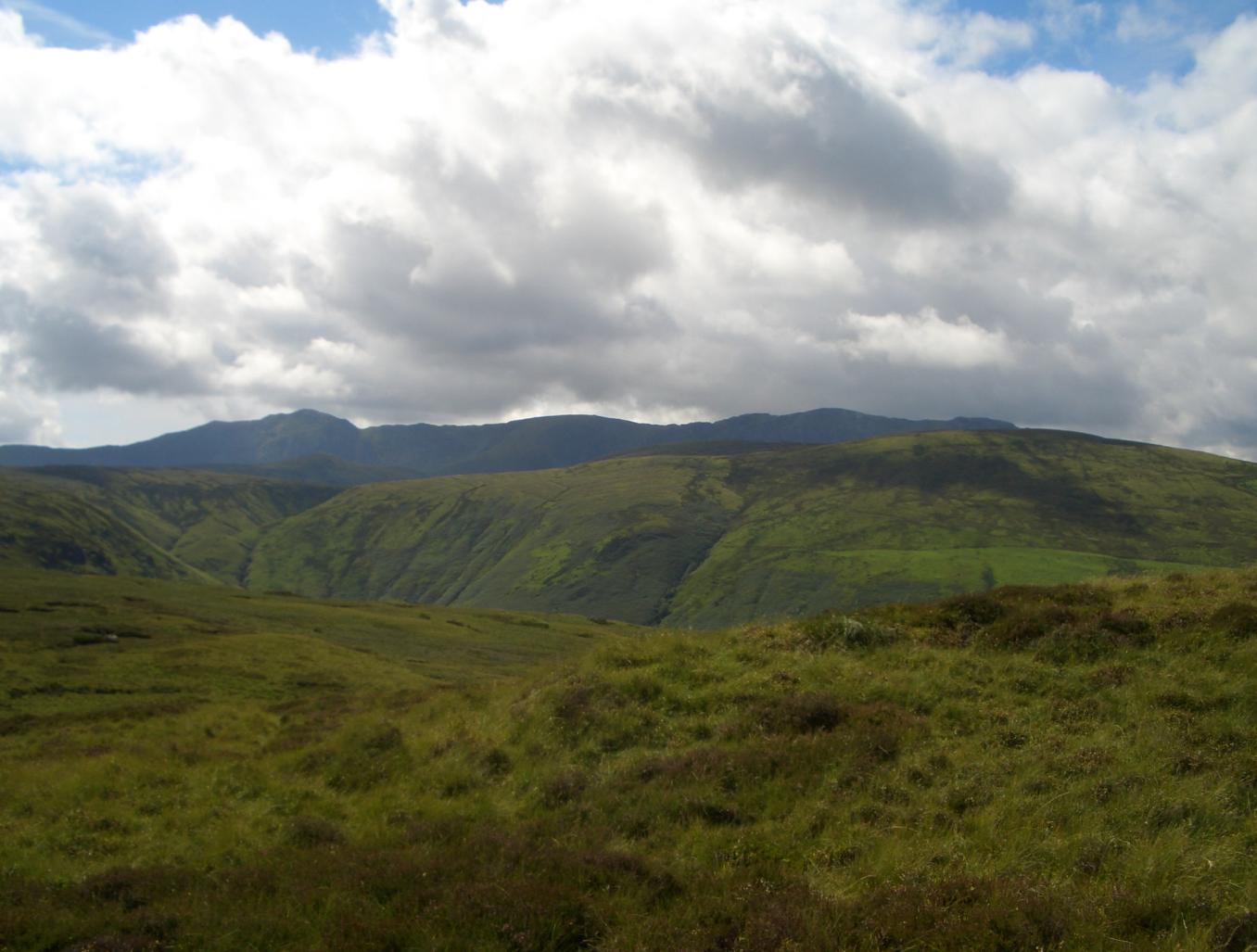
- Foel Rhudd, Esgeiriau Gwynion and Llechwedd Du (right) with the Aran Fawddwy ridge (behind) from Moel y Cerrig Duon

Highest point
- Elevation: 659 m (2,162 ft)
- Prominence: 15 m (49 ft)
- Parent peak: Esgeiriau Gwynion
- Listing: Nuttall

Naming
- Language of name: Welsh

Geography
- Location: Gwynedd, Wales
- Parent range: Aran Fawddwy
- OS grid: SH 89585 23951
- Topo map: OS Landranger 125

Foel Rhudd is a top of Esgeiriau Gwynion in north Wales. It tops a wide area of peat bog, the summit marked only by a few stones. Esgeiriau Gwynion summit is directly to the west, separated by a small col of peat hags. Llechwedd Du is connected to the south by a small ridge.
