= Llechwedd Du =

Mountain (614m) in Gwynedd, Wales

Coordinates: 52°47′16″N 3°38′29″W

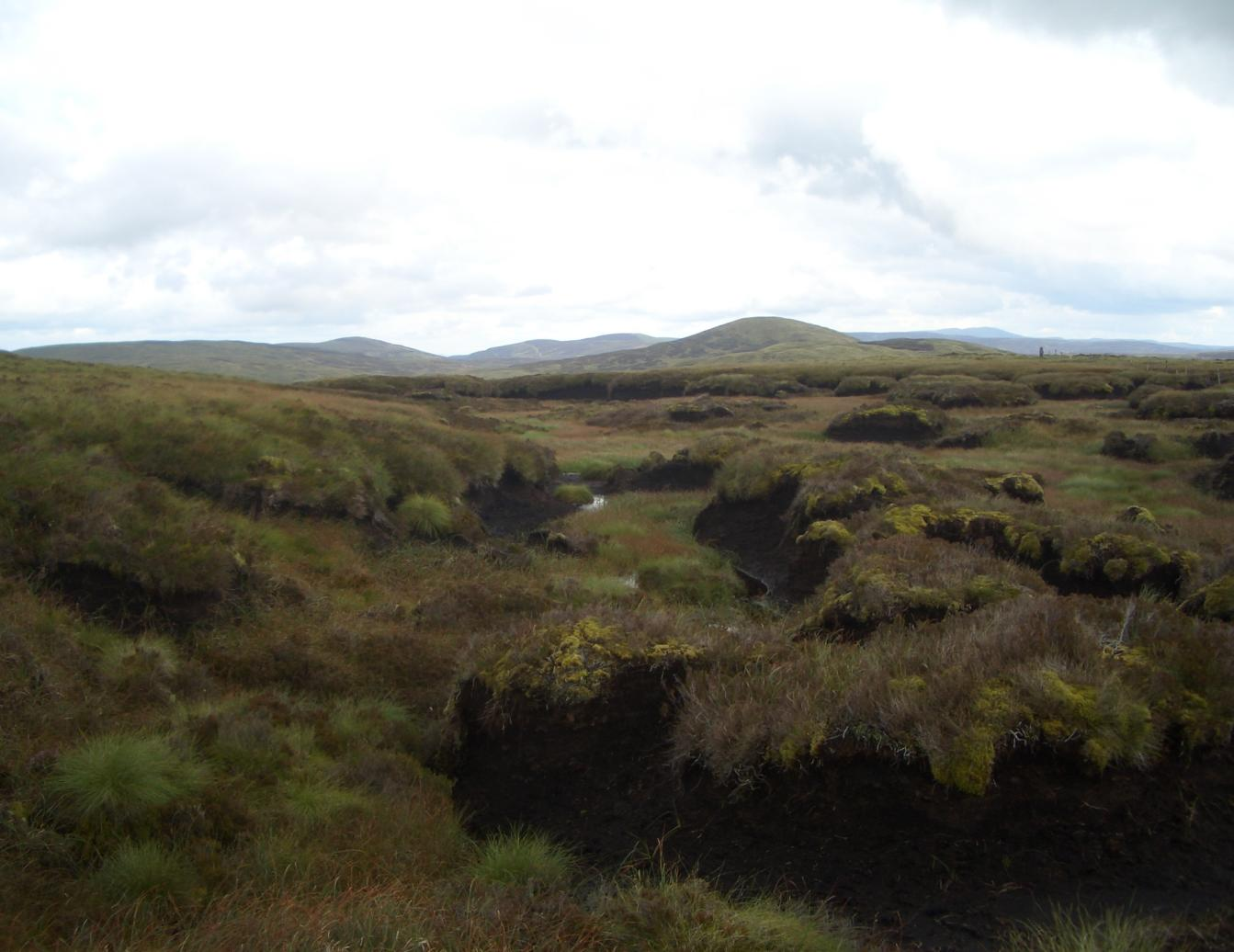
- The Llechwedd Du plateau with Moel y Cerrig Duon ahead

Highest point
- Elevation: 614 m (2,014 ft)
- Prominence: 35 m (115 ft)
- Parent peak: Aran Fawddwy
- Listing: Hewitt, Nuttall

Naming
- English translation: White Ridges
- Language of name: Welsh

Geography
- Location: Gwynedd, Wales
- Parent range: Aran Fawddwy
- OS grid: SH 89396 22398
- Topo map: OS Landranger 125

Llechwedd Du is a subsidiary summit of Esgeiriau Gwynion in north Wales. It forms a long peat bog plateau that start at the end of Esgeiriau Gwynion's south ridge, and ends with the higher summit of Moel y Cerrig Duon.

The summit is located on one of the large peat hags at the western edge of the plateau, and is marked by a few stones. To the east is Moel y Cerrig Duon, Foel y Geifr and the Berwyn range, to the south is Gwaun Lydan and to the west is Aran Fawddwy and Foel Hafod-fynydd. The plateau is crossed by a road at Bwlch y Groes, the pass between Llechwedd Du and Moel y Cerrig Duon.
