= Foel Hafod-fynydd =

Mountain (689m) in Gwynedd, Wales

Coordinates: 52.790139°N 3.66506°W

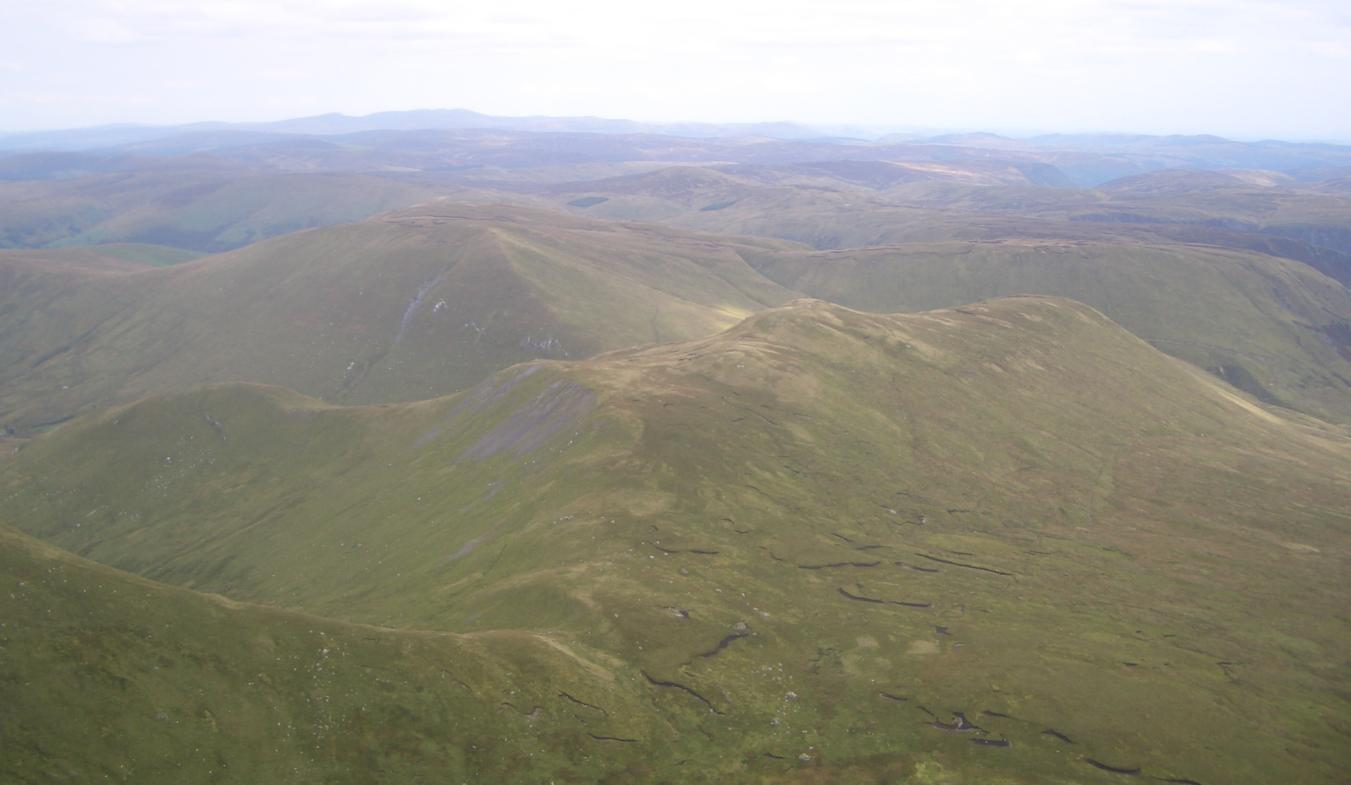
- Foel Hafod-fynydd from Aran Fawddwy with Esgeiriau Gwynion (behind left) and Llechwedd Du (behind right)

Highest point
- Elevation: 689 m (2,260 ft)
- Prominence: 84 m (276 ft)
- Parent peak: Aran Fawddwy
- Listing: Hewitt, Nuttall

Naming
- Language of name: Welsh

Geography
- Location: Gwynedd, Wales
- Parent range: Snowdonia
- OS grid: SH8770922722
- Topo map: OS Landranger 124

Foel Hafod-fynydd is a subsidiary summit of Aran Fawddwy in southern Snowdonia, North Wales, Wales, United Kingdom. It tops the east ridge of Erw y Ddafad-ddu. Creiglyn Dyfi nestles in the bowl between Foel Hafod-fynydd and Aran Fawddwy.

The summit is grassy marked by a few stones. Esgeiriau Gwynion lies to the north, Llechwedd Du to the east, and Gwaun Lydan to the south.
