= Foel Goch =

Foel Goch may refer to:

- Foel Goch (Arenigs), a 611m mountain in north-east Wales
- Foel Goch (Hirnant), a 613m subsidiary summit of Esgeiriau Gwynion
- Foel-goch, a mountain in Snowdonia, north-west Wales
