= Llangywer =

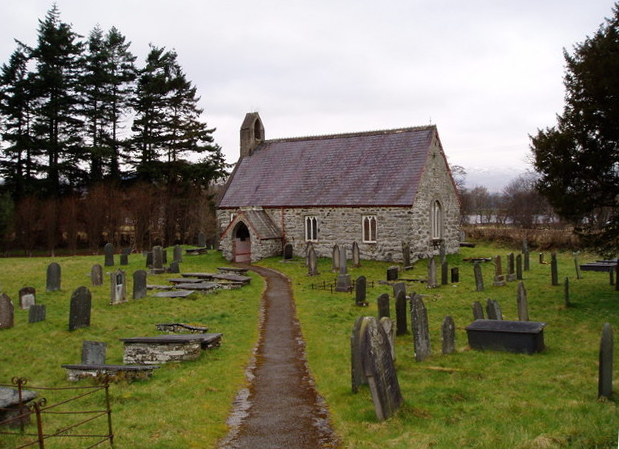
- Church of St. Cywair

- Location within Gwynedd
- Population: 260 (2011)
- OS grid reference: SH 9043 3225
  - Cardiff: 98.3 mi (158.2 km)
  - London: 175.9 mi (283.1 km)
- Community: Llangywer
- Principal area: Gwynedd
- Preserved county: Gwynedd
- Country: Wales
- Sovereign state: United Kingdom
- Post town: BALA
- Postcode district: LL23
- Dialling code: 01678
- Police: North Wales
- Fire: North Wales
- Ambulance: Welsh
- UK Parliament: Dwyfor Meirionnydd
- Senedd Cymru – Welsh Parliament: Dwyfor Meirionnydd
- List of places UK Wales Gwynedd 52.876501°N 3.629505°W Map of the community

Llangywer (or Llangower) is a community near Bala, Gwynedd, Wales. It is in the historic county of Merionethshire, and is located on the south side of Llyn Tegid (Bala Lake). In 2011 the population of Llangywer was 260, with 67.2% of them able to speak Welsh.

Notable people from the community include the poet Euros Bowen, who was vicar of St Cywair's Church, which is a Grade II listed building, although it is now empty.

Bala Lake Railway runs past the village of Llangywer. The community includes the hamlet of Rhos-y-gwaliau.

Llangywer has a church dedicated to St. Cywair, which is now closed; a village hall which hosts the annual Sioe Llangywer; a miniature narrow gauge railway halt; and a spit of land in Llyn Tegid, forming a public shore and caravan camping site.

== History and antiquities ==
A medieval motte and bailey castle, Castell Gronw is near the outlet of the lake.

In the Middle Ages, Llangywer was one of three parishes of the commote of Uwch Tryweryn in the cantref of Penllyn. Cwm Cynllwyd, which rises in the direction of Bwlch y Groes, marks the western boundary of the parish, which rises to the east towards the southern Berwyn mountains. It is a very mountainous area, with most of the habitations lying on the strip of low-lying land on the shore of Bala Lake.

Llangywer is also notable for the folk song:

Ffarwel i blwy Llangywer
A'r Bala dirion deg ...

(Farewell to the parish of Llangower, and the fair gentle Bala ...)

== St Cywair's Church ==
The parish church is consecrated to a local female saint by the name of Cywair. Very little is known about her, but it is believed that an image of her appears in the stained-glass east window of the church.

There is a record of this church in the Taxatio Ecclesiastica of 1291.

It is recorded that John Wynne visited the place in 1729. According to Cadw, the correct name is "St Gwawr", but this is disputed. The pillars of the church date back at least to the 15th century. Its doors were closed for the last time in 2003 as the church then only had three members.

A nearby holy well - Ffynnon Gywair - is concealed by a stone called Llech Cywair. According to a version of the folk legend about a drowned kingdom where Bala Lake is today, the reason for the drowning of the kingdom by the lake was neglecting to replace this stone. The church of Llangywer dates from the 13th century, but was rebuilt in 1871.

== See also ==
- Stac Rhos and Trum y Gwragedd mountains
- List of localities in Wales by population
