= Gwaun Lydan =

Hill (632m) in Gwynedd, Wales

Coordinates: 52°46′36″N 3°39′41″W

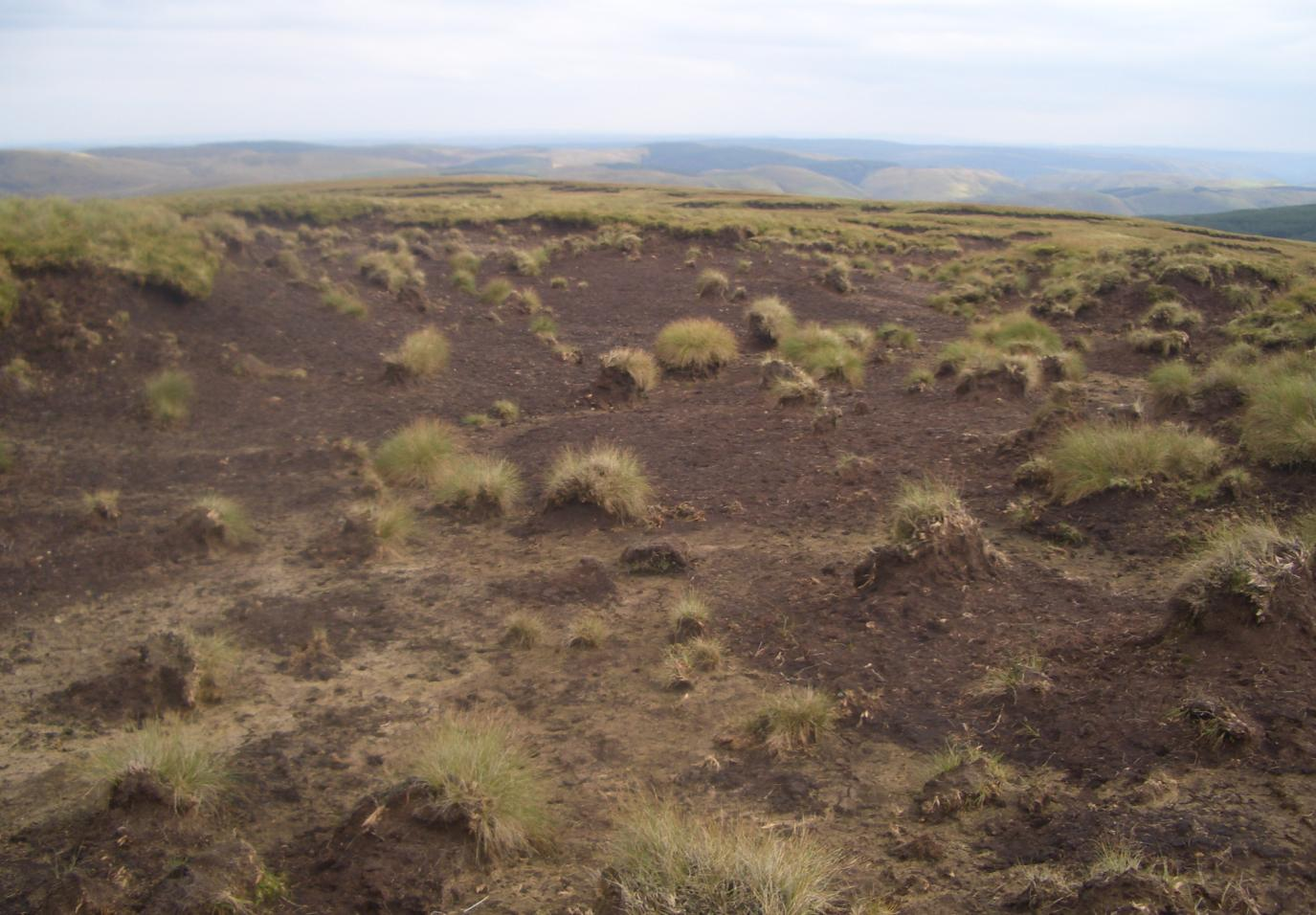
- The peat bog plateau summit

Highest point
- Elevation: 632 m (2,073 ft)
- Prominence: 17 m (56 ft)
- Parent peak: Aran Fawddwy
- Listing: Nuttall

Naming
- English translation: wide bog
- Language of name: Welsh

Geography
- Location: Gwynedd, Wales
- Parent range: Snowdonia
- OS grid: SH 88053 21193
- Topo map: OS Landranger 124

Gwaun Lydan is the top of Aran Fawddwy in the south of the Snowdonia National Park in Gwynedd, Wales. It is located at the end of the south ridge. The summit comprises a small boggy plateau, the highest point being a peat hag marked by a few stones.

The summit panorama includes the eastern face of Aran Fawddwy with Creiglyn Dyfi below. To the north is Esgeiriau Gwynion and Llechwedd Du. Heading east, Pen yr Allt Uchaf can be reached.
