= Euros Bowen =

Welsh poet and clergyman (1904–1988)

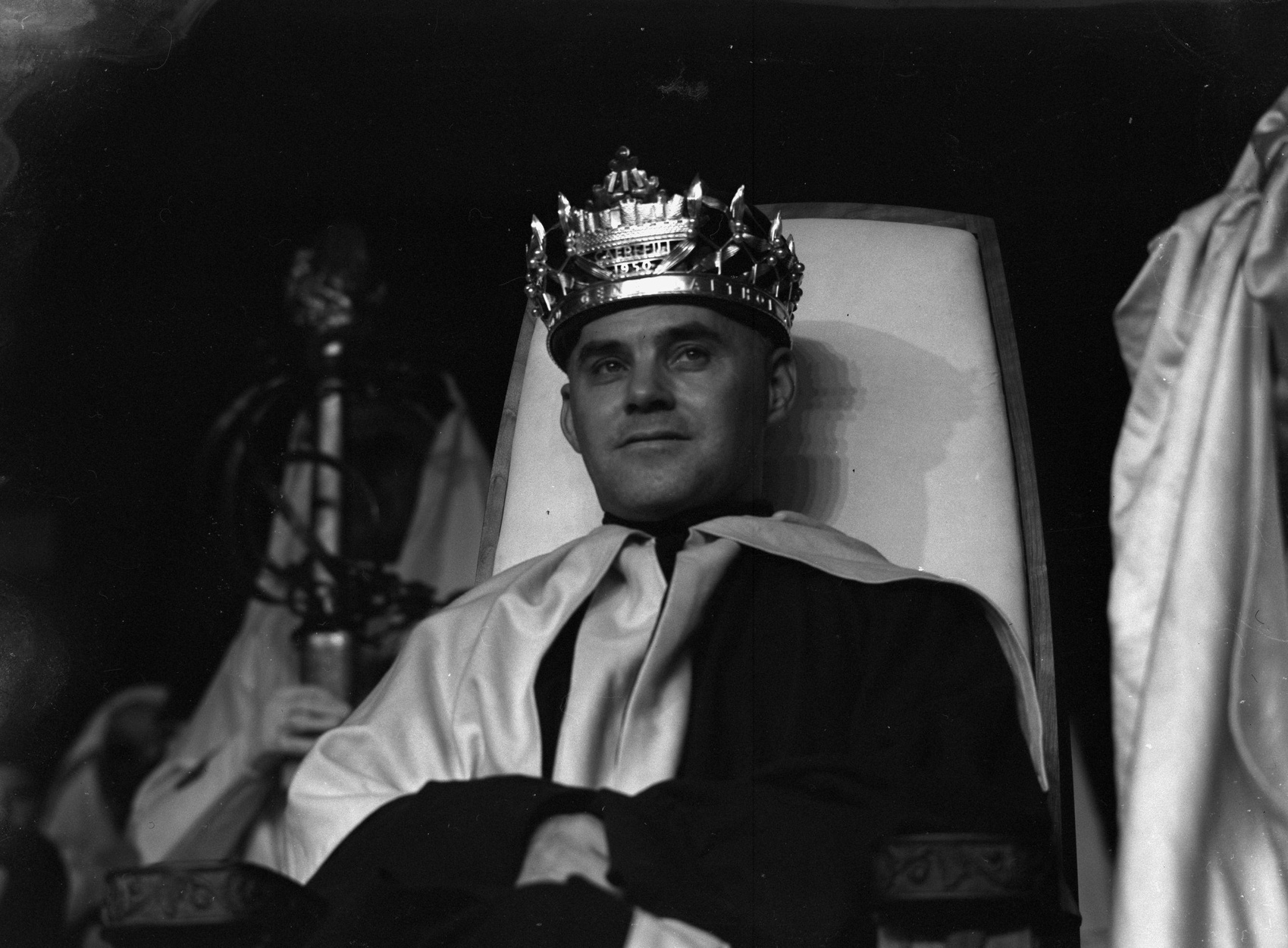
Euros Bowen at the 1950 National Eisteddfod crowning ceremony

Euros Bowen OBE (12 September 1904 – 2 April 1988) was a poet in the Welsh language and a priest.

Born in Treorchy, and a brother of the poet Geraint Bowen, he was educated at the Presbyterian College, Carmarthen, and later at the University of Wales (initially at University College, Aberystwyth, before transferring to University College, Swansea), Mansfield College, Oxford and St Catherine's College, Oxford. Although he initially intended to become a Nonconformist minister, he converted to Anglicanism as a student. After more study at St David's College, Lampeter, he was ordained as a priest of the Church in Wales, serving from 1934 to 1938 as curate of Wrexham, then as rector of Llanuwchllyn with Llangywer, on the shore of Lake Bala in Merionethshire. He retired from these parishes in 1973. He spent the remainder of his life in Wrexham.

Euros Bowen began writing poetry in earnest in 1947, during the heavy winter which left him snowbound in his rectory. In many ways a "late bloomer", for he did not publish his first volume of poetry until he was in his early 50s, he at once became notable for the way in which he developed the traditional metres of Welsh poetry. Compared by some with the writing of T. Gwynn Jones, who was also seen as a moderniser of Welsh prosody, Bowen's early work (collected in Cerddi – 'Poems' – in 1957) is dense with layered imagery, and whilst later on he moved into free verse, it is actually difficult to chart his development in a linear way. Although the work in his first book is rich with form and form experiment, his second; Cerddi Rhydd (Free Verses, published 1961) dispenses with all formal devices and is made up of prose proems in the manner of Rimbaud. Not only was Bowen responsible for bringing into Welsh poetry influences from mainland Europe which effectively revolutionised the medium – in this he is in many ways to Welsh literature what T. S. Eliot and Ezra Pound were to English – he is also of considerable interest in British poetry because his work with prose poems anticipates that of Geoffrey Hill (in Mercian Hymns) by a clear decade. Although there are some skeins in his work which are reminiscent of Symbolism (he translated a selection of French Symbolist poets into Welsh) and of a kind of Imagism, Bowen always thought of himself as a Sacramentalist and believed the images in his poems communicated as signs. Comparable in stature with his fellow priest-poet R. S. Thomas, Bowen is, nevertheless, considerably more celebratory in tone, and the transformations in nature, as he sees them, often appear as communicating a personal revelation.

In the year after he retired Bowen published a selection of his poems, which included not only the Welsh-language originals but parallel English versions in verse. His poems have also been translated by R. Gerallt Jones and the American Joseph P. Clancy, among others.

Euros Bowen won the Bardic Crown at the National Eisteddfod of Wales in 1948 for O'r Dwyrain, and again in 1950 for Difodiant. In 1970 he was awarded the OBE for services to Welsh Literature.

He edited the literary journal Y Fflam from 1946 to 1952.

== Selected later works ==
- Oes y Medwsa (1987)
- Lleidr Tân
- Buarth Bywyd
- Trin Cerddi

== Sources ==
- Oxford Dictionary of National Biography entry: Patrick Thomas, ‘Bowen, Euros (1904–1988)’, first published September 2004, 690 words
