= Dave Lloyd Mega Challenge =

The Dave Lloyd Mega Challenge was a cyclosportive challenge based in North East Wales. Held for the first time in June 2008. The Independent Association of Cyclosportive Organisers placed it in the top three of UK sportives.

The challenge featured three routes: the Mini-MEGA, Midi-MEGA and MEGA, varying in distance and climbing. For the 2009 event, the MEGA route was 145 miles with 5,500 metres of climbing. The 2008 event took in climbs such as Bwlch Pen Barras, The Shelf, Horseshoe Pass, World's End, The Cerrig 'Road To Hell', Bwlch y Groes, and 'The Stingers'. The 2009 event also featured the Bwlch y Groes the 'hard way', from Dinas Mawddwy, and finished atop Bwlch Pen Barras.

The 2010 edition saw a significant drop in the number of entries

== See also ==
- Challenge riding
- Brevet or Randonnée
- Bicycle touring
- Cyclosportive
