= Gwaun y Llwyni =

Mountain (685m) in Gwynedd, Wales

Coordinates: 52°46′11″N 3°41′43″W

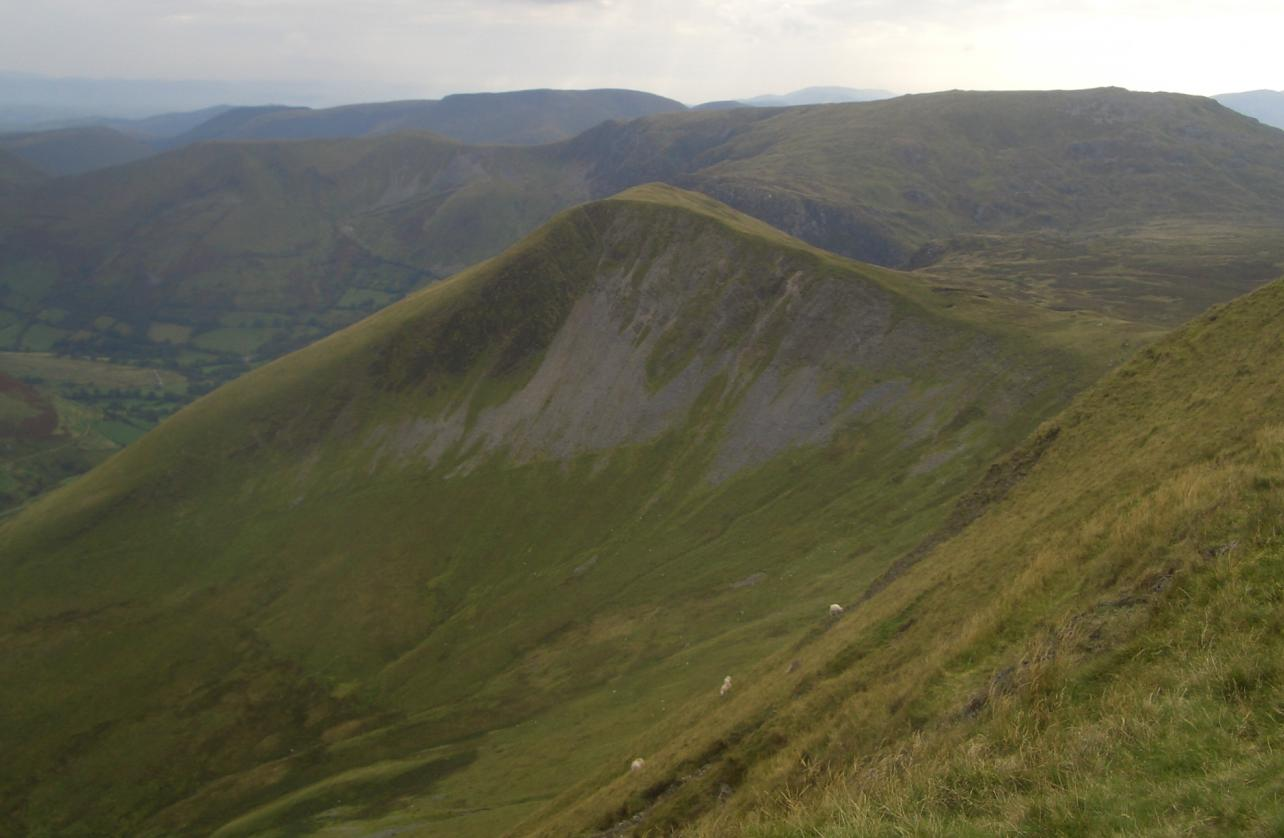
- Gwaun y Llwyni and Glasgwm (behind) from Aran Fawddwy

Highest point
- Elevation: 685 m (2,247 ft)
- Prominence: 43 m (141 ft)
- Parent peak: Aran Fawddwy
- Listing: Hewitt, Nuttall

Naming
- Language of name: Welsh

Geography
- Location: Gwynedd, Wales
- Parent range: Snowdonia
- OS grid: SH 85720 20484
- Topo map: OS Landranger 124

Gwaun y Llwyni is a subsidiary summit of Aran Fawddwy in southern Snowdonia, Wales. It forms a part of the Aran mountain range.

The peak's southern face is very steep and forms one of the backwalls of Cwm Cywarch. The summit is grassy and is marked by a small cairn. Pen yr Allt Uchaf rises on the other side of Cwm Cywarch, Aran Fawddwy is to the north-east, Waun Camddwr to the north and Glasgwm to the west.
