= Aran Benllyn =

Mountain (885m) in Gwynedd, Wales

Coordinates: 52°48′15″N 3°40′55″W

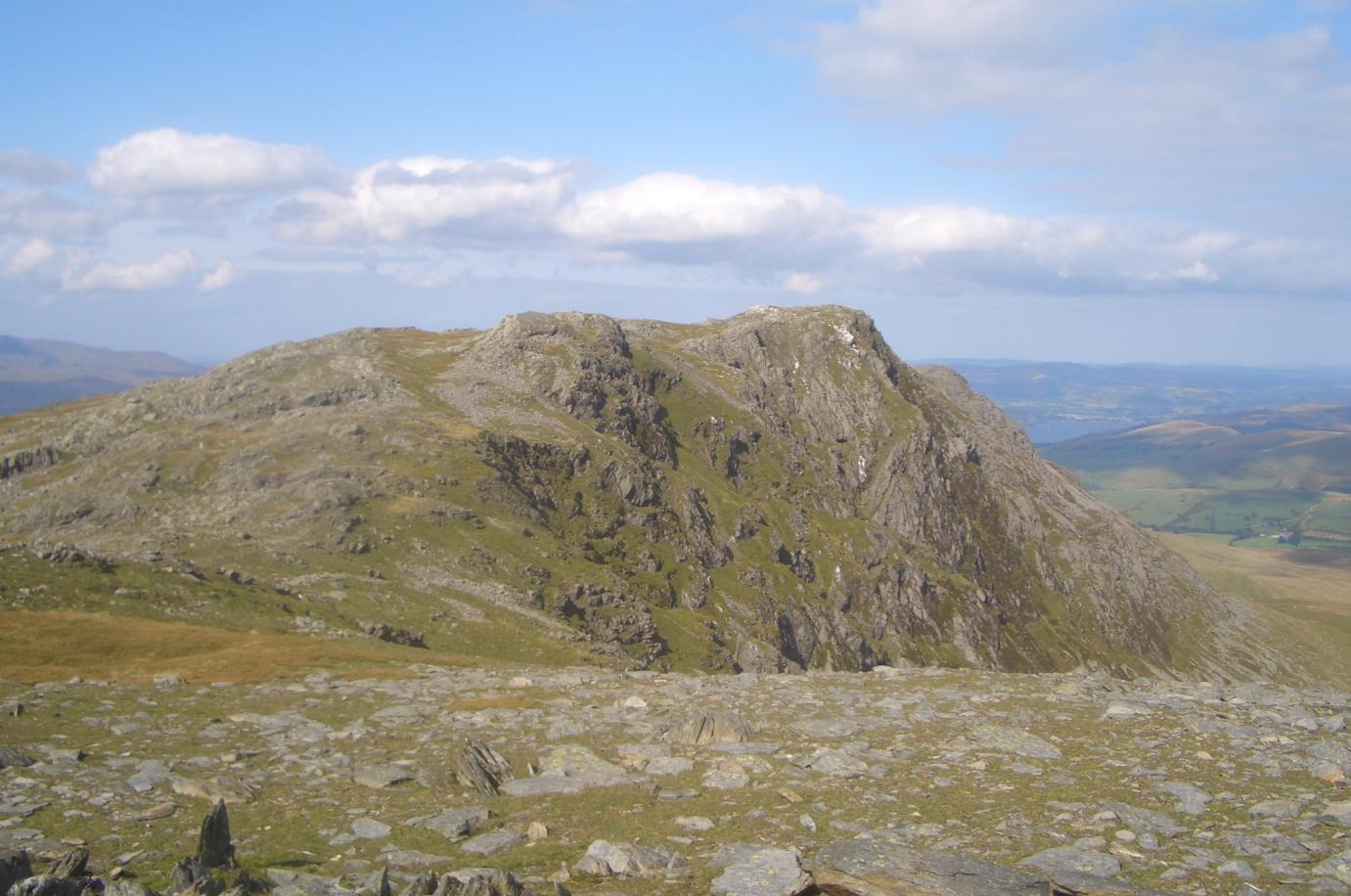
- Aran Benllyn from Erw y Ddafad-ddu

Highest point
- Elevation: 885 m (2,904 ft)
- Prominence: 50 m (160 ft)
- Parent peak: Aran Fawddwy
- Listing: Hewitt, Nuttall

Naming
- Language of name: Welsh

Geography
- Location: Gwynedd, Wales
- Parent range: Snowdonia
- OS grid: SH 86712 24270
- Topo map: OS Landranger 124

Aran Benllyn is a subsidiary summit of Aran Fawddwy in southern Snowdonia, Wales. It is the second highest peak in the Aran mountain range.

It rises from the south shore of Llyn Tegid (Bala Lake), and tops the northern point on the main Aran ridge. In between it and Aran Fawddwy lies another summit: Erw y Ddafad-ddu.

The summit has a few rocky outcrops and is marked by a small cairn. The view include: Llyn Tegid to the north, Foel y Geifr to the east, Erw y Ddafad-ddu to the south and Rhobell Fawr and Cadair Idris to the west.

North-east of the summit is a lake, Llyn Lliwbran, there is also a smaller lake nearby, Llyn Pen Aran.
