= Waun Camddwr =

Hill (621.7m) in Gwynedd, Wales

Coordinates: 52°46′11″N 3°42′37″W

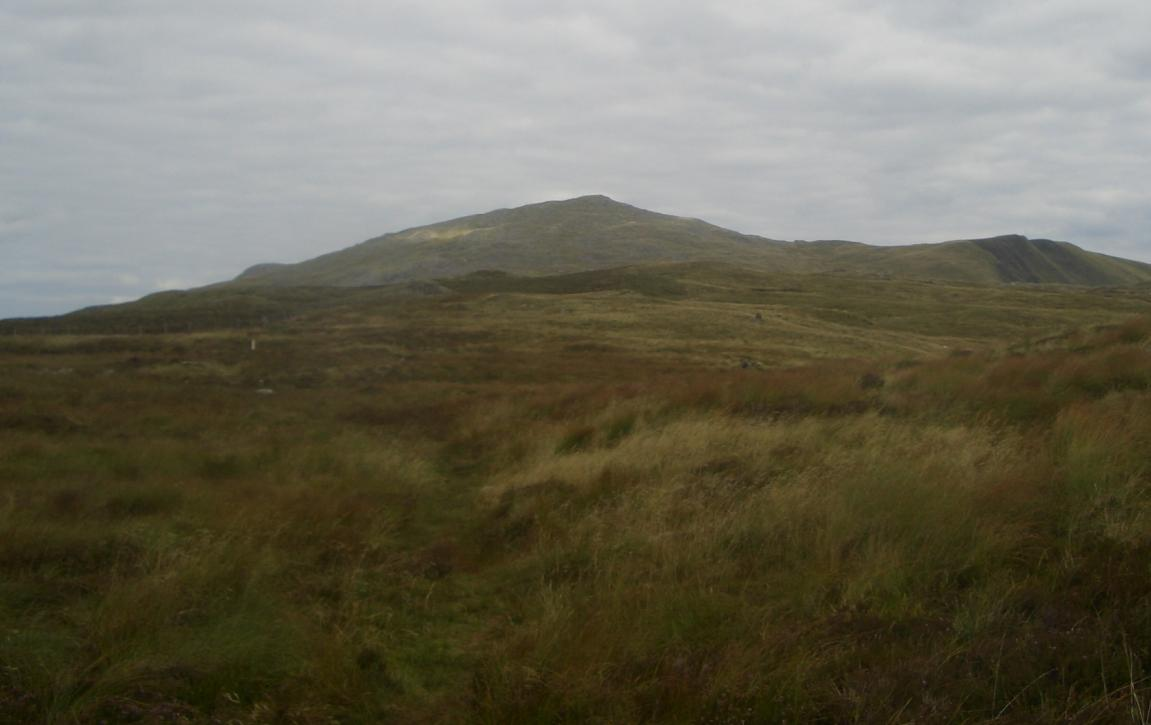
- The summit of Waun Camddwr with Aran Fawddwy (behind)

Highest point
- Elevation: 622 m (2,041 ft)
- Prominence: 16 m (52 ft)
- Parent peak: Aran Fawddwy
- Listing: Nuttall

Naming
- Language of name: Welsh

Geography
- Location: Gwynedd, Wales
- Parent range: Snowdonia
- OS grid: SH8471320510
- Topo map: OS Landranger 124

Waun Camddwr is a top of Aran Fawddwy in the south of the Snowdonia National Park in Gwynedd, Wales. It is the highest point on a wide boggy area between the summits of Aran Fawddwy and Glasgwm. It was surveyed after the first Nuttall list was compiled, and found to have just enough prominence to be included. The summit is a rocky outcrop amid an area of heather, long grass and peat bog. Gwaun y Llwyni rises to the south of the summit.
