= Duon =

Duon may refer to the following things:

- A DNA codon also serving as part of a transcription factor binding site
- Moel y Cerrig Duon, a summit in north east Wales
- Duon, a boss in the game Super Smash Bros. Brawl
