= Aran Fawddwy =

Mountain in Wales

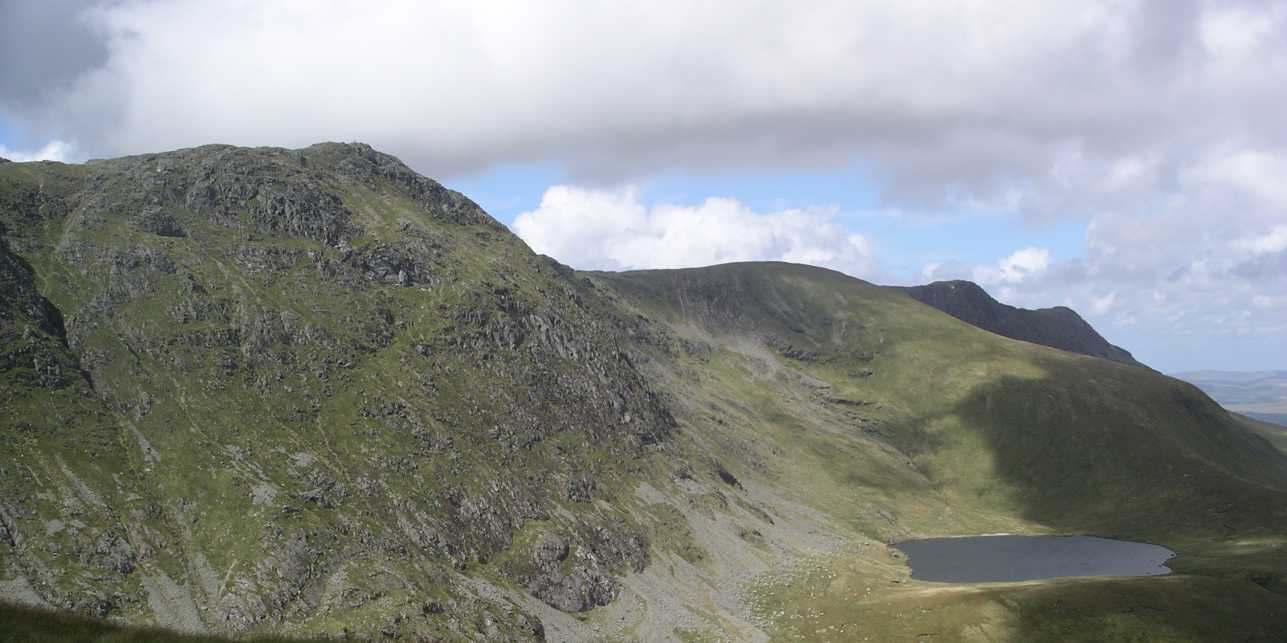
- Aran Fawddwy (on left) and Creiglyn Dyfi

Highest point
- Elevation: 905.6 m (2,971 ft)
- Prominence: 671 m (2,201 ft)
- Listing: Marilyn, Hewitt, Nuttall
- Coordinates: 52°47′16.35″N 3°41′18.10″W

Naming
- English translation: Mawddwy peak
- Language of name: Welsh
- Pronunciation: Welsh: [ˈaran ˈvau̯ðʊɨ̯]

Geography
- Location within Wales
- Location: Gwynedd, Wales
- Parent range: Snowdonia
- OS grid: SH862223
- Topo map: OS Landranger 124, 125

Listed summits of Aran Fawddwy
Name	Grid ref	Height	Status
Aran Benllyn	SH866243	885 m (2,904 ft)	H, N
Erw y Ddafad-ddu	SH864234	872 m (2,861 ft)	H, N
Foel Hafod-fynydd	SH876227	689 m (2,260 ft)	H, N
Gwaun y Llwyni	SH857204	685 m (2,247 ft)	H, N
Gwaun Lydan	SH880211	632 m (2,073 ft)	N
Waun Camddwr	SH862223	621 m (2,037 ft)	N
Pen yr Allt Uchaf	SH867192	620 m (2,030 ft)	H, N

Aran Fawddwy is a mountain in southern Snowdonia, Wales. It is the highest point (county top) of the historic county of Merionethshire (for local government purposes, it lies within the current council area of Gwynedd). It is the highest peak in the Aran mountain range, the only peak in Wales outside North Snowdonia above 900m, and higher than anywhere in the United Kingdom south of Northern Snowdonia. The nearest small settlements to the mountain are Dinas Mawddwy to the south, Llanymawddwy to the southeast, Llanuwchllyn on the shores of Llyn Tegid (Bala Lake) to the north, and Rhydymain to the west. The nearest settlements with around 2,000 people are Bala and Dolgellau. On the eastern slopes of Aran Fawddwy is the small lake named Creiglyn Dyfi, the source of the River Dyfi. Its sister peak is Aran Benllyn at 885 metres (2,904 ft). There is also a middle peak: Erw y Ddafad-ddu.

== Geography ==
Aran Fawddwy, which is only 9.5 metres (31 ft) short of being a member of the Welsh 3000s, is the highest peak in the Aran mountain range and the 16th highest summit in Wales. (The third highest by Topographic prominence). The other two Marilyns in this range are Glasgwm and Esgeiriau Gwynion.

It is the highest British mountain south of Snowdon, and is the principal summit of the predominant southwest–northeast ridge between Dolgellau and Bala, southern Snowdonia, a ridge that continues westwards as Cadair Idris.

== Ascent ==
Aran Fawddwy is best ascended from Cywarch in the south, although a longer ridge climb is possible from the Bala side. The mountain forms a long rocky ridge with Aran Fawddwy as the highest point, but Aran Benllyn is another notable summit. The eastern side is extremely steep, falling spectacularly in crags to a series of glacial cwms or corries which also enclose two small lakes (Creiglyn Dyfi and Llyn Lliwbran). The western slopes are also rocky, but less steep and more uniform.

A cairn is placed on the eastern ridge as a memorial to RAF Mountain Rescue team member Michael Robert Aspain, who was struck and killed by lightning in 1960.

== Panorama ==
The view from the summit is extensive, covering most of the mountain ranges of North Wales and as far south as the Brecon Beacons and Pembrokeshire peninsula. On an exceptionally clear day, the Lake District in England and the Wicklow Mountains in Ireland are visible.

The following principal hills may be seen from the summit in perfect conditions (distances in miles):

- N-NE: Carnedd y Filiast (14), Black Combe (103), Mwdwl Eithin (20), Scafell Pike (117), Aran Benllyn (1), Fairfield (122), Foel Goch (14), The Calf (120), Ward's Stone (96), Penycloddiau (33), Moel Famau (31), Pendle Hill (94), Foel Fenlli (30), Winter Hill (76), Hail Storm Hill (85)
- NE-E: Blackstone Edge (90), Moel y Gamelin (25), Cyrn y Brain (27), Moel Fferna (19), Cadair Bronwen (15), Foel Cedig (8), Cadair Berwyn (14), Esgeiriau Gwynion (2), Merryton Low (77), Ipstones Edge (76), Gyrn Moelfre (21), Mynydd y Briw (20)
- E-SE: Rhialgwm (12), Cannock Chase (72), The Wrekin (48), Moel y Golfa (27), Turners Hill (72), Earl's Hill (36), Long Mountain (27), Stiperstones (35), Brown Clee Hill (51), Long Mynd (39), Corndon Hill (32), Titterstone Clee Hill (53), Moel Bentyrch (14), Burrow (41), High Vinnalls (49), Worcestershire Beacon (74)
- SE-S: Beacon Hill (Powys) (34), Great Rhos (42), Carnedd Wen (9), Black Mountain (59), Gwaunceste Hill (46), Pegwn Mawr (28), Waun Fach (62), Pen Allt Mawr (65), Mynydd Troed (61), Bryn y Fan (22), Waun Rydd (65), Pen y Fan (63), Fan Fawr (64), Fan Nedd (65), Drygarn Fawr (40)
- S-SW: Fan Brycheiniog (63), Plynlimon (23), Disgwylfa Fawr (25), Moel y Llyn (21), Maesglase (5), Frenni Fawr (68), Foel Cwmcerwyn (74), Glasgwm (2), Tarren y Gesail (14), Mynydd Carningli (73), Tarrenhendre (16), Waun Oer (7)
- SW-W: Garn Fawr (79), Cadair Idris (11), Tyrrau Mawr (13), Pared y Cefn Hir (13), Foel Offrwm (7), Blackstairs Mountain (132), Mount Leinster (130), Mynydd Enlli (46)
- W-NW: Y Garn (10), Diffwys (13), Lugnaquilla (117), Y Llethr (13), Garn Fadryn (37), Rhinog Fach (13), Kippure (114), Rhinog Fawr (13), Rhobell Fawr (5), Yr Eifl (34), Gyrn Ddu (32), Moel Ysgyfarnogod (15), Garnedd Goch (28), Moel Hebog (24), Trum y Ddysgl (27), Mynydd Mawr (28)
- NW-N: Moelwyn Bach (18), Moelwyn Mawr (19), Yr Aran (24), Moel Eilio (29), Snowdon (25), Glyder Fawr (26), Manod Mawr (16), Tryfan (26), Moel Siabod (22), Carnedd Llewelyn (28), Moel Llyfnant (9), Foel Fras (30), Creigiau Gleision (26), Tal y Fan (32), Arenig Fawr (9)

== See also ==
- Geology of Snowdonia National Park
