= Griffith Davies (poet) =

Welsh poet (1868–1962)

Griffith Davies (1868-1962) was a Welsh poet from the Llanuwchllyn area Merionethshire. He was raised by his mother, his father having died before he was born, and was educated at the local school, and for a time at Owen Owen's (1850 - 1920) school in Oswestry. For most of his life he lived as a farmer, farming Bryncaled farm in Merionethshire. He also served as a deacon of Yr Hen Gapel (Congregational church), Llanuwchllyn, and was for a time Vice-President of the Merioneth Historical Society.

His writings include a number of contributions to the local press, and articles written for 'Y Tyst', 'Dysgedydd', and 'Geninen'. In 1910 he published a booklet containing his awdl (long poem) to Michael D. Jones. Awen Gwyndaf Llanuwchllyn, a volume of his works, was published posthumously in 1966, edited by James Nicholas. He died in 1962, and was buried in the new cemetery at Llanuwchllyn.
