= Burrow (Shropshire) =

Hill in Shropshire, England

Coordinates: 52.44145°N 2.91206°W

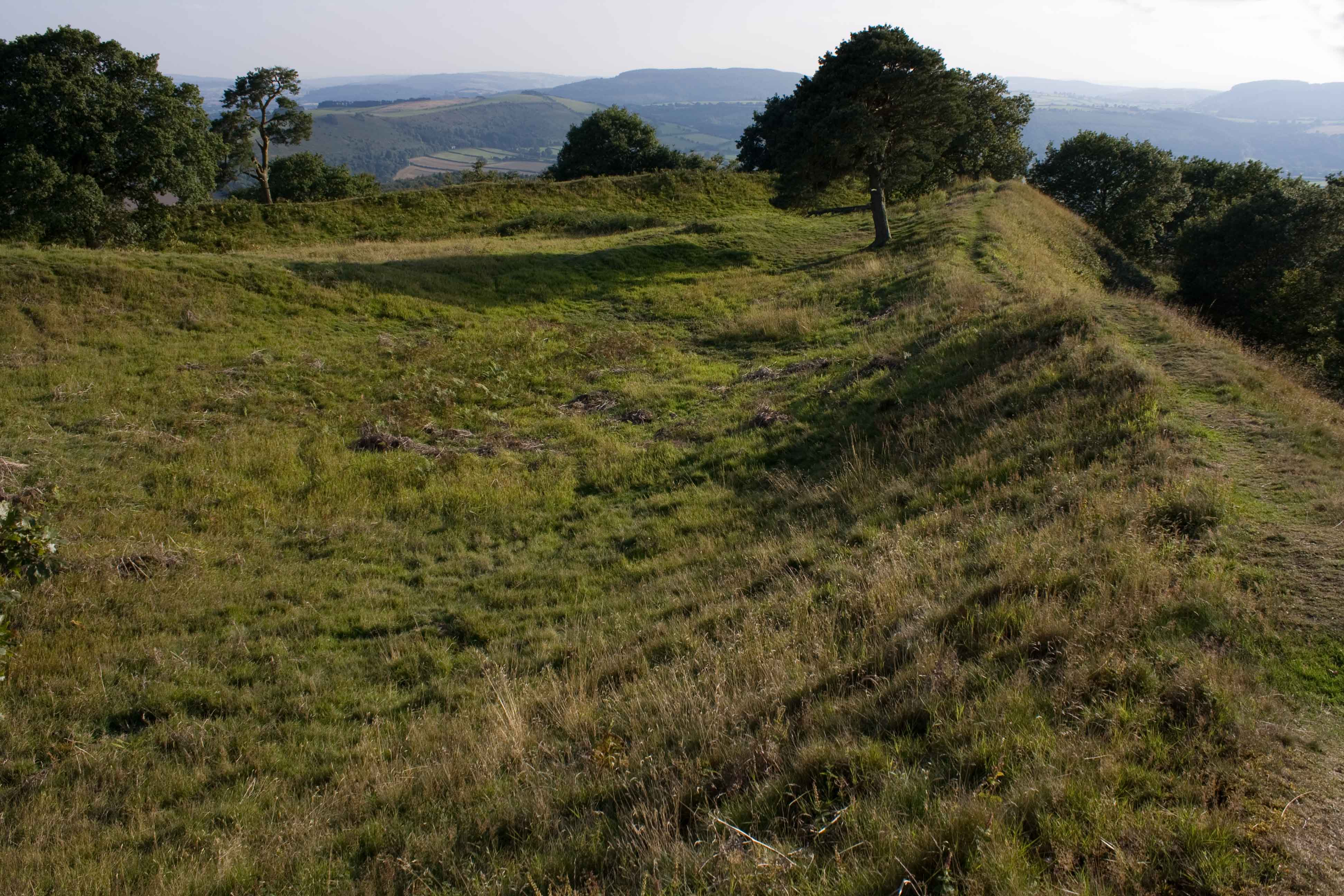
- South-west corner of the hill fort

Highest point
- Elevation: 358 m (1,175 ft)
- Prominence: c. 189 m
- Parent peak: Pegwn Mawr
- Listing: Marilyn

Geography
- Location: Shropshire, England
- Parent range: Shropshire Hills
- OS grid: SO381830
- Topo map: OS Landranger 137

Burrow is a hill in Shropshire with an Iron Age hill fort at the summit known as Burrow Camp. The nearest villages are Hopesay and Aston-on-Clun. It includes a large number of hut platforms, and two natural springs.

At 15:45 on 13 September 1943 a Vickers Wellington crashed on the hill. The flight was part of a cross-country and practice bombing exercise from RAF Chipping Warden, Northamptonshire. The crew encountered a severe thunderstorm above south Shropshire and was seen to be struck by lightning while flying over Lydbury North causing the plane to catch fire and lose height before disintegrating on the hilltop killing all eight crew members.
