= Erw y Ddafad-ddu =

Mountain (872m) in Gwynedd, Wales

Coordinates: 52°47′46″N 3°41′6″W

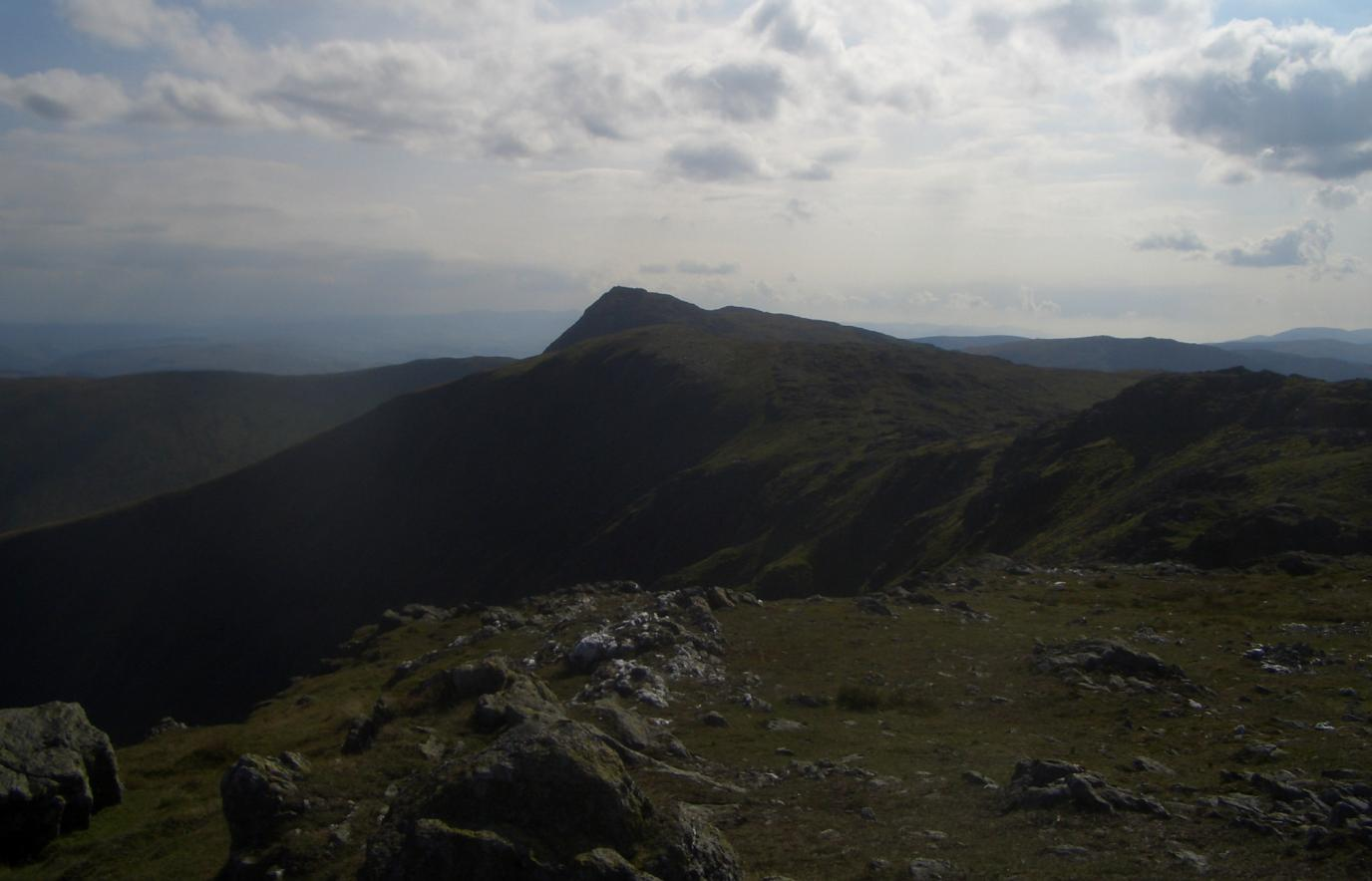
- Erw y Ddafad-ddu with Aran Fawddwy (behind) from Aran Benllyn

Highest point
- Elevation: 872 m (2,861 ft)
- Prominence: 37 m (121 ft)
- Parent peak: Aran Fawddwy
- Listing: Hewitt, Nuttall

Naming
- Language of name: Welsh

Geography
- Location: Gwynedd, Wales
- Parent range: Snowdonia
- OS grid: SH 86477 23385
- Topo map: OS Landranger 124

Erw y Ddafad-ddu is a subsidiary summit of Aran Fawddwy in southern Snowdonia, North Wales, Wales, United Kingdom. It is the third highest peak in the Aran mountain range.

It is lies at the centre of the main Aran ridge, situated between Aran Fawddwy to the south and Aran Benllyn to the north. Its east ridge leads off to the summit of Foel Hafod-fynydd. The summit is rocky and is marked by a small cairn.
