= Y Fflam =

Welsh literary journal (1946–1952)

Y Fflam ('the flame') was a Welsh-language literary journal published between 1946 and 1952 providing a platform for young Welsh writers. It included poetry, artworks, short fiction, and reviews. Its political viewpoint was strongly radical nationalism.

It was edited by Euros Bowen, Pennar Davies, and J. Gwyn Griffiths, and its contributors included D. Tecwyn Lloyd, Gareth Alban Davies, Bobi Jones, and R. S. Thomas.

Gwasg Y Fflam, Bala, was a small publisher set up to produce Y Fflam.

The journal has been digitized by the Welsh Journals Online project at the National Library of Wales.
