= Beacon Hill, Powys =

Coordinates: 52.3830°N 3.2114°W

Beacon Hill
- Mynydd Disglair
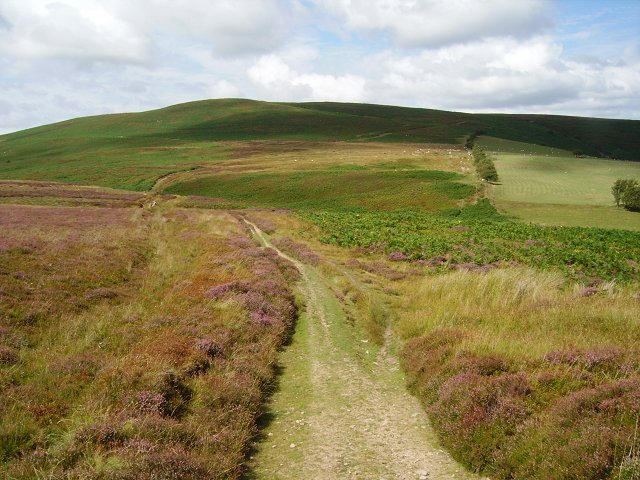

Highest point
- Elevation: 547 m (1,795 ft)
- Prominence: 174 m (571 ft)
- Parent peak: Pegwn Mawr
- Listing: Marilyn

Geography
- Location: Powys, Wales
- OS grid: SO176767
- Topo map: OS Landranger 136

Beacon Hill (Welsh: Mynydd Disglair) is a hill in the county of Radnorshire, Wales. It lies within the Powys unitary council area. It is located north-west of the town of Knighton close to the valley of the River Teme. Its summit is 547 metres (1,795 ft) above sea level, and is the highest point of a region of heather-clad moorland.
