= Pen yr Allt Uchaf =

Mountain (620m) in Gwynedd, Wales

Coordinates: 52°45′34″N 3°40′52″W

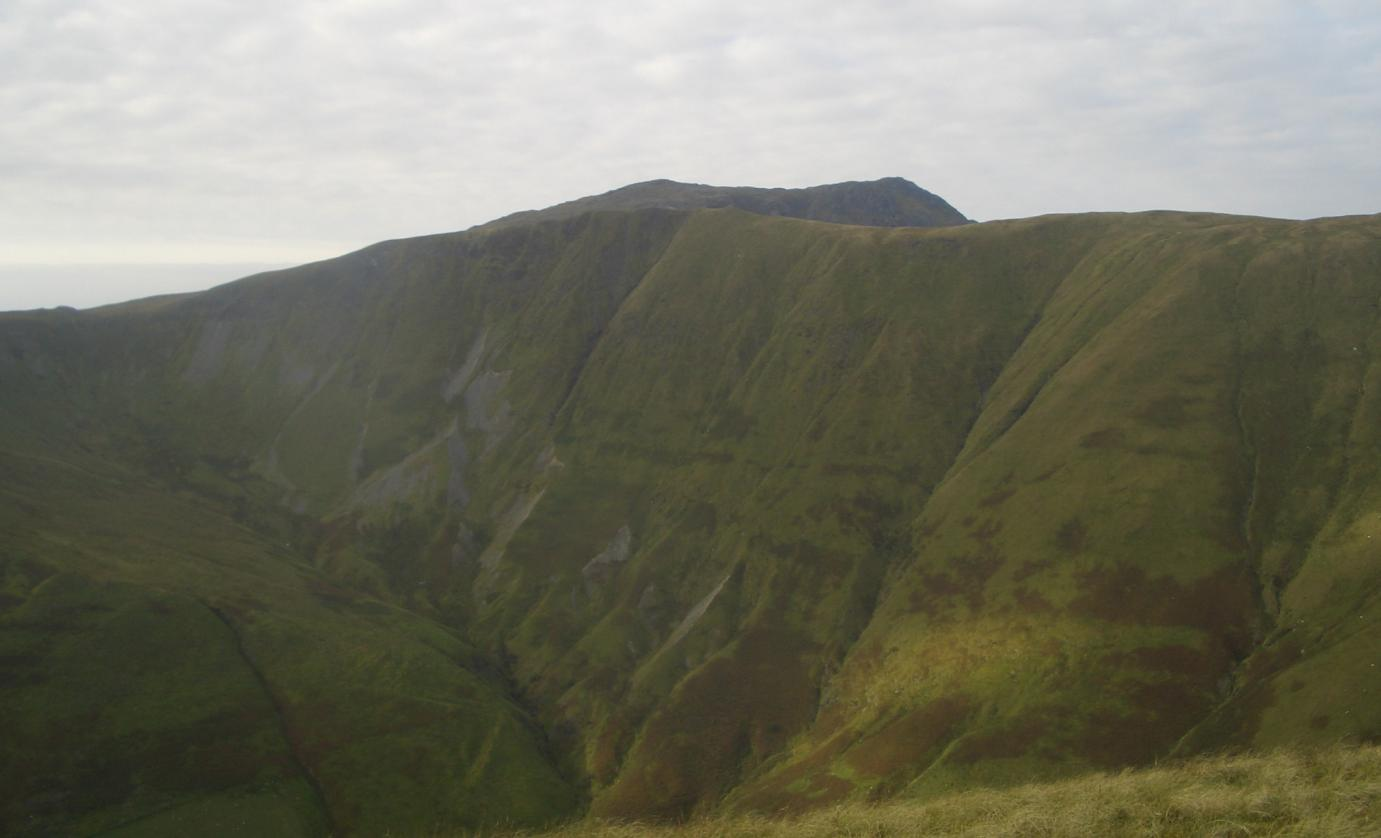
- Aran Fawddwy from Pen yr Allt Uchaf

Highest point
- Elevation: 620 m (2,030 ft)
- Prominence: 49 m (161 ft)
- Parent peak: Aran Fawddwy
- Listing: Hewitt, Nuttall

Naming
- English translation: top of the highest slope
- Language of name: Welsh

Geography
- Location: Gwynedd, Wales
- Parent range: Snowdonia
- OS grid: SH 86644 19322
- Topo map: OS Landranger 124

Pen yr Allt Uchaf is a subsidiary summit of Aran Fawddwy in the south of the Snowdonia National Park in Gwynedd, Wales. The summit is the highest point on a ridge branching off to the west of Aran Fawddwy's south ridge.

The summit is marked by a small cairn, and offers bird-eyes views of Cwm Cywarch. Close views of the steep south faces of Glasgwm, Gwaun y Llwyni and Aran Fawddwy are observed.
