= Pen y Brynfforchog =

Mountain in Gwynedd, Wales

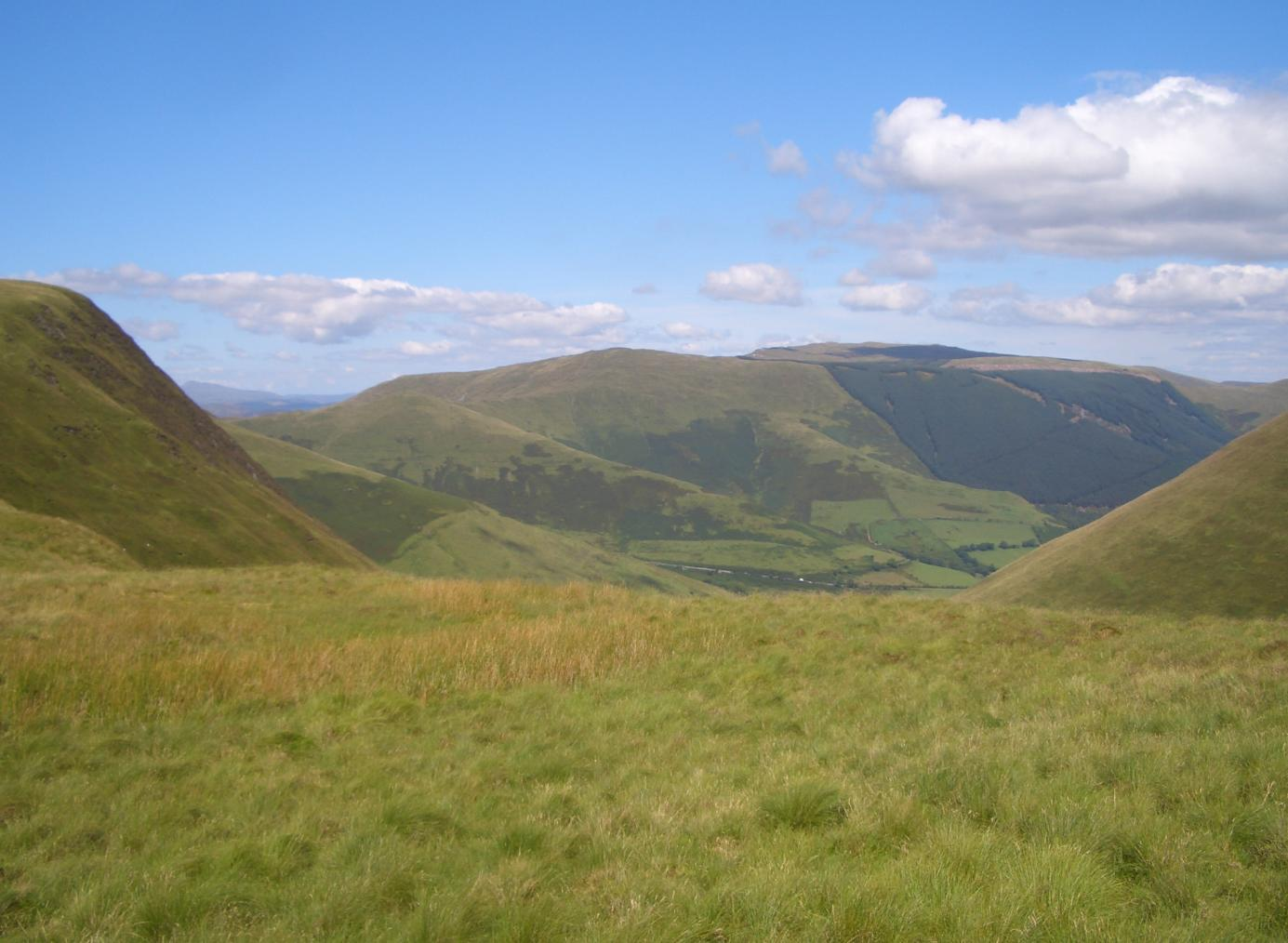
- Pen y Brynfforchog with Glasgwm (right) from Cribin Fawr

Highest point
- Elevation: 685 m (2,247 ft)
- Prominence: 71 m (233 ft)
- Parent peak: Glasgwm
- Listing: Hewitt, Nuttall
- Coordinates: 52.7462°N 3.7529°W

Geography
- Location: Gwynedd, Wales
- Parent range: Snowdonia
- OS grid: SH817179
- Topo map: OS Landranger 124

Pen y Brynfforchog is subsidiary summit of Glasgwm in North Wales forming part of the Aran range in southern Snowdonia.

It is separated from Glasgwm by the pass, Bwlch y Fign. The summit is bare and marked by a few stones. The views to the Dyfi hills: include direct view of the Craig Portas ridge, with Maesglase and Cribin Fawr.
