= Gyrn Ddu =

Hill in Gwynedd, Wales

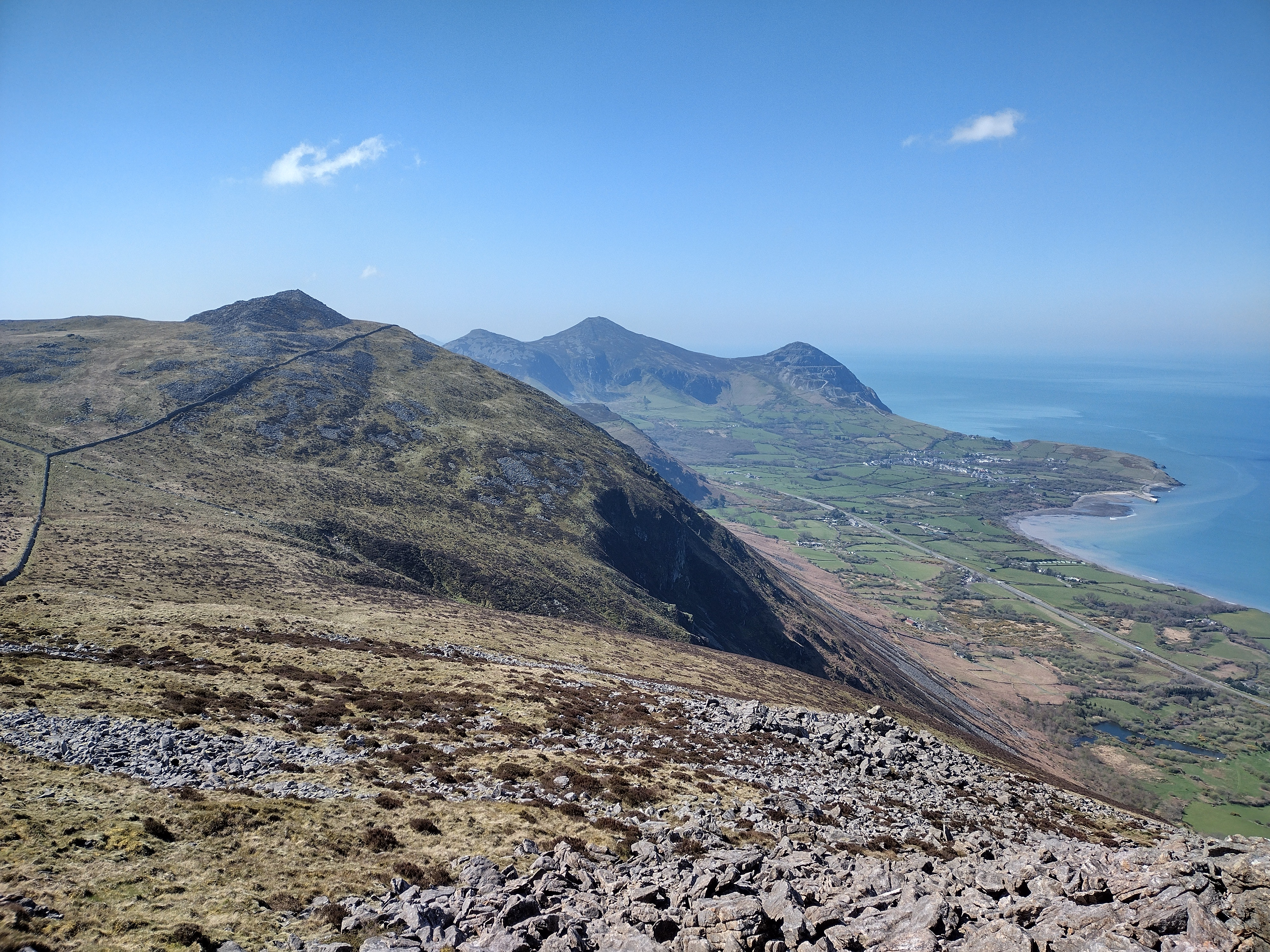
- Gyrn Ddu (left) and Yr Eifl seen from the summit of Gyrn Goch

Highest point
- Elevation: 522 m (1,713 ft)
- Prominence: 386 m (1,266 ft)
- Listing: Marilyns in the British Isles
- Coordinates: 52°59′40″N 4°23′01″W

Naming
- English translation: black horns
- Language of name: Welsh

Geography
- Location within Gwynedd
- Location: Gwynedd, Wales
- OS grid: SH 401467
- Topo map: OS Landranger 123 / Explorer 254

Gyrn Ddu is a hill near the northeastern corner of the Llŷn Peninsula in the community of Llanaelhaearn in the county of Gwynedd in North Wales. It forms the western half of a wider upland area, another significant top of which is the 510 m summit of Bwlch Mawr to the east.

The distinct northern top of Gyrn Ddu is Gyrn Goch, which attains a height of 492 m. The summit of an eastern top which reaches 491 m is crowned by a prehistoric cairn. To the southwest of Gyrn Ddu is the lower top of Moel Pen-llechog, which reaches a height of 316 m, whilst to the south is the 416 m flat top of Moel Bronmiod.

== Geology ==
In common with a number of other isolated hills in Llŷn, Gyrn Ddu is formed by an igneous intrusion of Palaeozoic age. The northwestern slopes of Gyn Ddu have been quarried in the past and a number of inclines descend the steep slopes beneath them .

== Access ==
A single public footpath crosses the southern flanks of the hill but the larger part of the hill is mapped as open country under the Countryside and Rights of Way Act 2000 and therefore freely available to walkers. A further public footpath runs from the hamlet of Gyrn Goch to the edge of the open country on its northern flanks.
