= Esgeiriau Gwynion =

Mountain in north Wales

Coordinates: 52.798943°N 3.648549°W

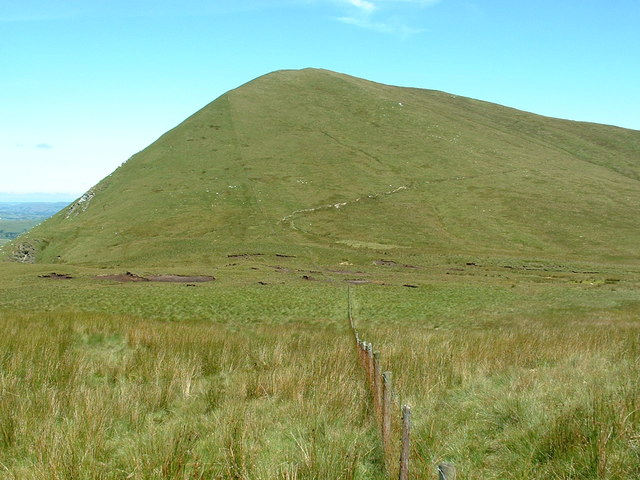
- Esgeiriau Gwynion

Highest point
- Elevation: 671 m (2,201 ft)
- Prominence: 166 m (545 ft)
- Parent peak: Aran Fawddwy
- Listing: Marilyn, Hewitt, Nuttall

Naming
- English translation: White Ridges
- Language of name: Welsh

Geography
- Location: Gwynedd, Wales
- Parent range: Aran Fawddwy
- Topo map: OS Landranger 125

Listed summits of Esgeiriau Gwynion
Name	Grid ref	Height	Status
Foel Rhudd		659 metres (2,162 ft)	Nuttall
Foel y Geifr		626 metres (2,054 ft)	Hewitt, Nuttall
Moel y Cerrig Duon		625 metres (2,051 ft)	Hewitt, Nuttall
Llechwedd Du		614 metres (2,014 ft)	Hewitt, Nuttall
Foel Goch (Hirnant)		613 metres (2,011 ft)	Hewitt, Nuttall
Cefn Coch		606 m (1,988 ft)	sub Hewitt

Esgeiriau Gwynion (Welsh for "white shanks") is a mountain in north Wales. It is the smallest of the three Marilyns that form the Aran range, the others being Aran Fawddwy and Glasgwm.

The peak is situated to the east of Aran Fawddwy, separated by Bwlch Sirddyn, and stretches right the way round Cwn Cynllwyd towards the Berwyn range at Foel y Geifr. The tops are all boggy in character, all rising from a wild, peat bog plateau. A road penetrates the plateau at Bwlch y Groes.
