= Tan-y-Bwlch =

Tan-y-Bwlch means under the pass in Welsh and may refer to the following places in Wales:

- Tan-y-Bwlch, Aberystwyth, a nature reserve
- Tan-y-Bwlch, Maentwrog, a village
  - Tan-y-Bwlch railway station
- Plas Tan y Bwlch, the Snowdonia National Park environmental studies centre
