= Trum y Gwragedd =

Hill (611.1m) in Gwynedd, Wales

Coordinates: 52°50′34″N 3°34′24″W

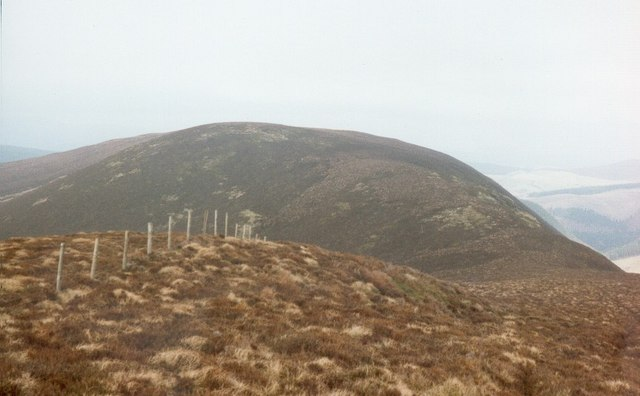
- Trum y Gwragedd from Foel y Geifr

Highest point
- Elevation: 611 m (2,005 ft)
- Prominence: 26 m (85 ft)
- Parent peak: Foel y Geifr
- Listing: sub Hewitt, Nuttall

Geography
- Location: Gwynedd, Wales
- Parent range: Snowdonia
- OS grid: SH 94121 28412
- Topo map: OS Landranger 115

Trum y Gwragedd is a top of Foel y Geifr in the Hirnantau. These hills rise from the south east shores of Llyn Tegid (Bala Lake).

The summit is boggy and marked by a few stones. To the south is Foel y Geifr and to the north is Foel Goch (Hirnant).
