= Tafarn-y-Gelyn =

Village in Denbighshire, Wales

Coordinates: 53.147°N 3.214°W

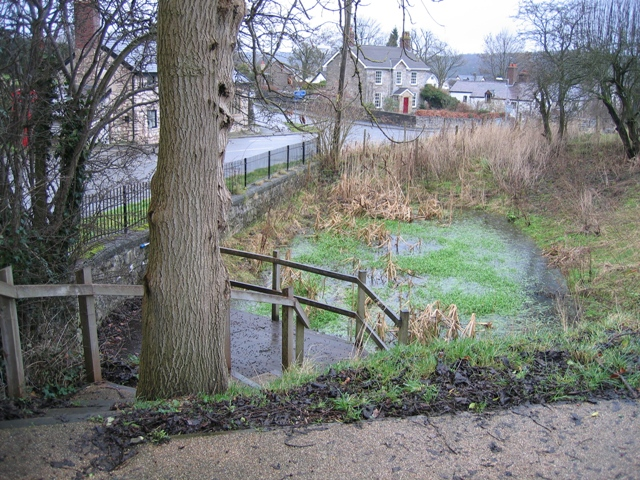
- Tafarn-y-Gelyn Pond

- Location within Denbighshire
- OS grid reference: SJ188618
- Community: Llanferres
- Principal area: Denbighshire
- Preserved county: Clwyd
- Country: Wales
- Sovereign state: United Kingdom
- Post town: Mold
- Postcode district: CH7
- Dialling code: 01352
- Police: North Wales
- Fire: North Wales
- Ambulance: Welsh
- UK Parliament: Clwyd East
- Senedd Cymru – Welsh Parliament: Clwyd West

Tafarn-y-Gelyn is a small village in the east of Denbighshire, North East Wales. Situated near Llanferres, at the foot of Moel Famau, just off the A494 road halfway between Ruthin and Mold.

Tafarn-y-Gelyn (225m) is the start of the old coach road Bwlch Pen Barras across the Clwydian Range, between Moel Famau and Moel Fenlli. This was the original road from the Vale of Clwyd to Mold before the advent of the A494.
