= Foel Goch (Hirnant) =

Subsidiary summit in Gwynedd, Wales

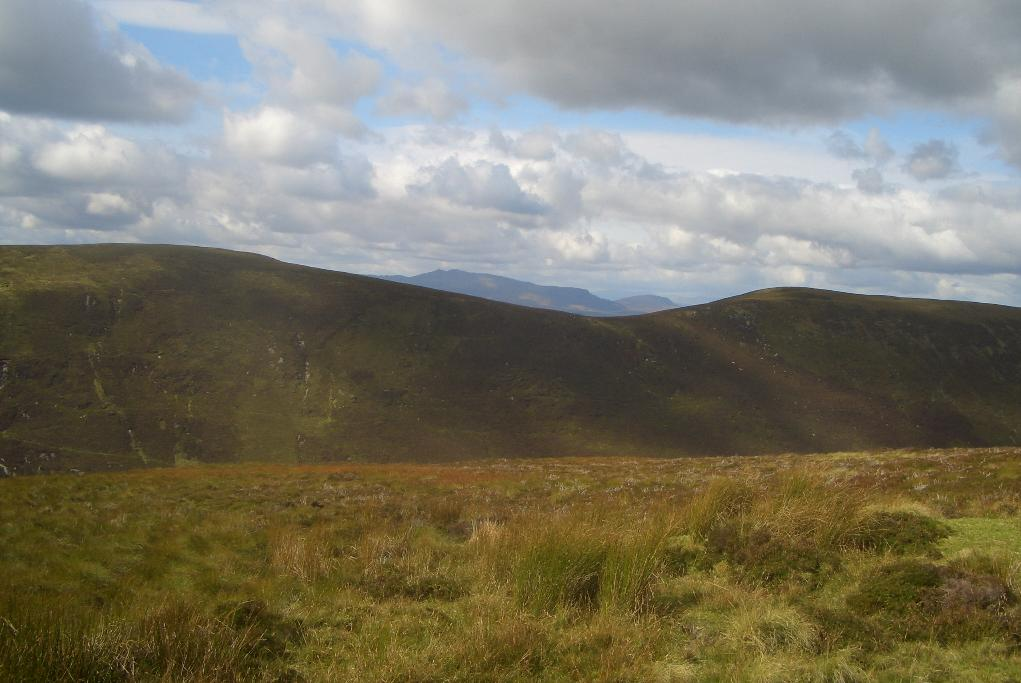
- Foel Goch (Right) and Trum y Gwragedd(Left) from Pen y Boncyn Trefeilw

Highest point
- Elevation: 613 m (2,011 ft)
- Prominence: 46 m (151 ft)
- Parent peak: Esgeiriau Gwynion
- Listing: Hewitt, Nuttall
- Coordinates: 52°50′56″N 3°34′14″W

Geography
- Location: Conwy, Wales
- Parent range: Snowdonia
- OS grid: SH943290
- Topo map: OS Landranger 115

Foel Goch is a subsidiary summit of Esgeiriau Gwynion, and is included in a group of hills known as the Hirnantau. These hills rise from the south east shores of Llyn Tegid (Bala Lake).

The summit is boggy and marked by a few stones. The views are good, with the retrospect of Foel y Geifr and Trum y Gwragedd to the south and northern Snowdonia to the north west.
