= Bwlch Mawr =

Hill in Gwynedd, Wales

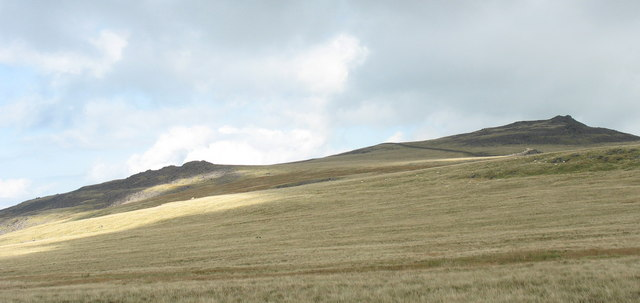

Highest point
- Elevation: 510 m (1,670 ft)
- Prominence: 145 m (476 ft)
- Parent peak: Gyrn Ddu
- Listing: HuMP, Sub-Marilyn
- Coordinates: 53.0048°N 4.3462°W

Naming
- English translation: big pass
- Language of name: Welsh

Geography
- Location within Wales
- Location: Gwynedd, Wales
- OS grid: SH 427478
- Topo map: OS Landranger 123 / Explorer 254

Bwlch Mawr is a hill near the northeastern corner of the Llŷn Peninsula in the community of Clynnog in the county of Gwynedd in North Wales.

Its name is an odd one for a hill, as it means "big pass" in English. It forms the eastern half of a wider upland area, the highest point of which is the 522 m summit of Gyrn Ddu, though it is Bwlch Mawr on which the Ordnance Survey constructed a trig point.

== Geology ==
In common with a number of other isolated hills in Llŷn, Bwlch Mawr is formed by an igneous intrusion of Palaeozoic age.

== Access ==
A single public footpath crosses the southern flanks of the hill but the upper parts of Bwlch Mawr are designated as open country under the Countryside and Rights of Way Act 2000 and therefore freely available to walkers. In the northwest a bridleway runs south from the village of Clynnog-fawr to the edge of open country.
