= Moel y Cerrig Duon =

Mountain (625m) in Gwynedd, Wales

Coordinates: 52°48′15″N 3°35′55″W

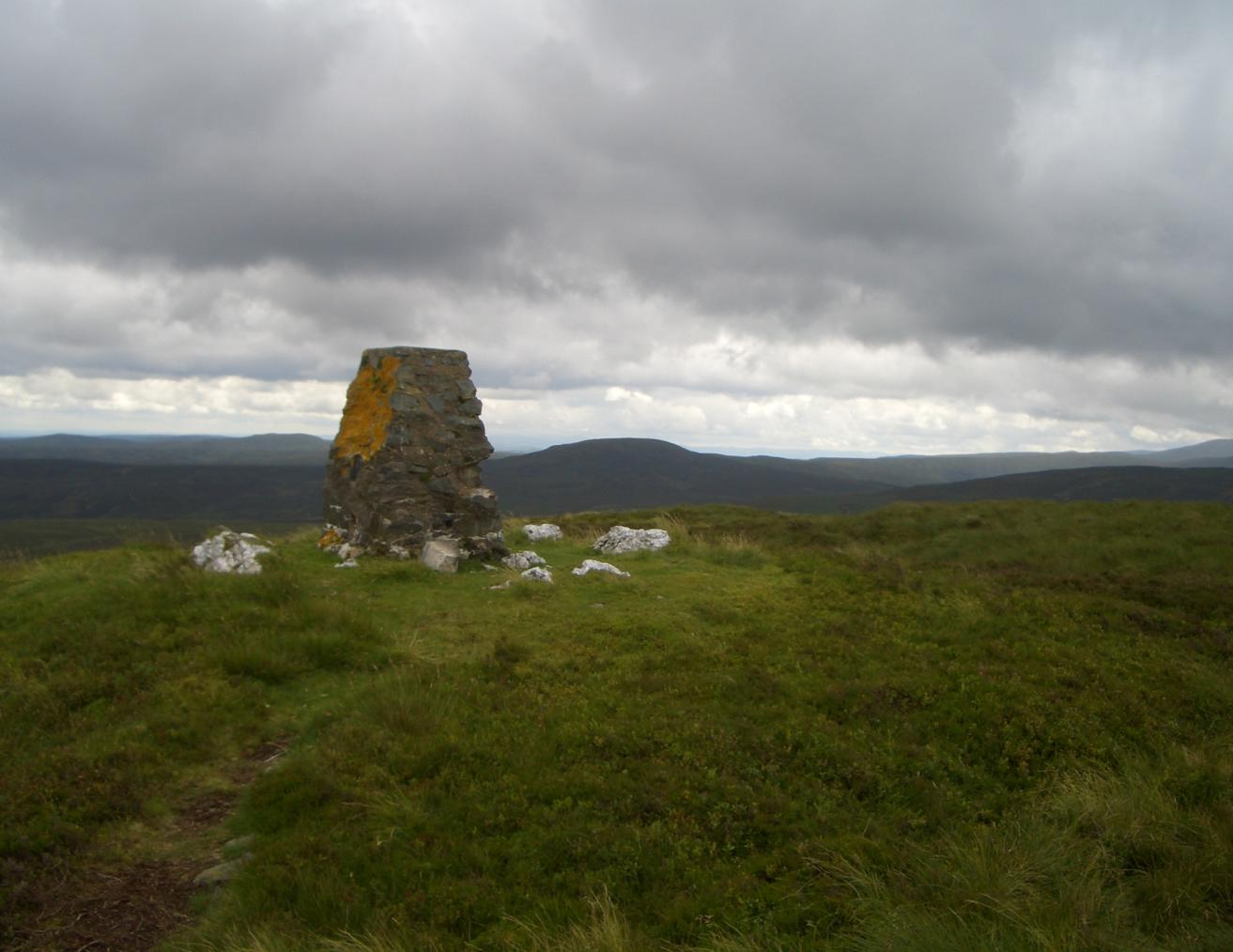
- Moel y Cerrig Duon from Foel y Geifr summit

Highest point
- Elevation: 625 m (2,051 ft)
- Prominence: 80 m (260 ft)
- Parent peak: Esgeiriau Gwynion
- Listing: Hewitt, Nuttall

Naming
- English translation: bare hill of the black rocks
- Language of name: Welsh

Geography
- Location: Gwynedd, Wales
- Parent range: Aran Fawddwy
- OS grid: SH 92336 24145
- Topo map: OS Landranger 125

Moel y Cerrig Duon is a subsidiary summit of Esgeiriau Gwynion in Gwynedd in north Wales.

Moel y Cerrig Duon tops the eastern end of a long peat bog plateau along with Llechwedd Du. Its summit has a conical shape, rising suddenly from the bog. The summit itself is grassy, marked by a small cairn and a stake. To the north-east is Foel y Geifr, to the east Cyrniau Nod and to the west is Llechwedd Du, Esgeiriau Gwynion, and Aran Fawddwy.

Its otherwise unremarkable SW top Foel y Groes(582m) forms the watershed between the Dee, Severn and Dyfi catchments.

The Aran range continues south from Moel y Cerrig Duon forming a large area of high moorland to the west of Lake Vyrnwy, crowned by Mynydd Coch. To the north it continues to Foel y Geifr, the eastern outpost of the Aran Fawddwy range.
