= Bwlch Penbarras =

Mountain pass in Wales

Coordinates: 53.137°N 3.251°W

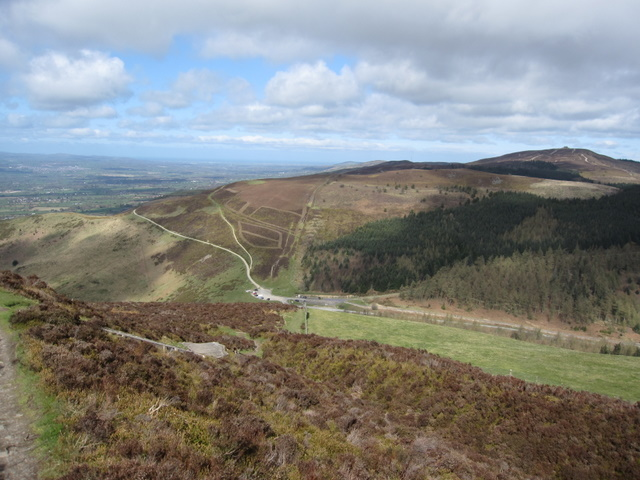
A view, from Foel Fenlli, showing the summit of Bwlch Penbarras and the Offa's Dyke Path heading north towards Moel Famau.

Bwlch Penbarras (also known as Bwlch Pen Barras, or the Old Bwlch) is a mountain pass in the Clwydian Range and Dee Valley Area of Outstanding Natural Beauty, in north-east Wales. The gap, which is at an altitude of 360 m (1,180 ft), lies between the hills of Moel Famau and Foel Fenlli. An unclassified road between Tafarn-y-Gelyn and Llanbedr-Dyffryn-Clwyd runs from east to west through the pass. Offa's Dyke Path, running broadly south–north, crosses the road at its highest point.

The alternative name of Old Bwlch references its position on the historic route between Mold and Ruthin via Llanbedr Dyffryn Clwyd. It was superseded by the 18th-century Mold to Denbigh turnpike (now the A494 road), which crosses the Clwydian range several miles to the south, at Bwlch-y-Parc. The eastern side of Bwlch Penbarras is an almost straight ascent with no severe gradients; however, the western side of the pass is characterised by long drops, a narrower road and steep gradients: the road drops 260 m (850 ft) in 1.5 mi (2.4 km) with gradients approaching 25% and a sharp hairpin bend.

== Leisure ==
The pass is a popular access point for walkers venturing to Moel Famau, and there are two Natural Resources Wales car parks to meet demand: one at the summit of the pass, and one a mile down the eastern side towards Tafarn-y-Gelyn. Access tracks climb through the forest from both car parks to Moel Famau's summit.

The steep climb on the western approach from Llanbedr-Dyffryn-Clwyd has made the pass popular with cyclists. Cycling Weekly magazine has featured it as a 'Killer Climb', and also listed it in the Dave Lloyd Mega Challenge cyclosportive. Nigel Blackwell of Half Man Half Biscuit mentioned the pass in a 2012 interview when he said: "the biggest achievement for me is creating a situation for myself whereby I can get up of a morning and decide to go and tackle Bwlch Pen Barras on the bike".
