= Foel y Geifr =

Subsidiary summit of Esgeiriau Gwynion in Wales

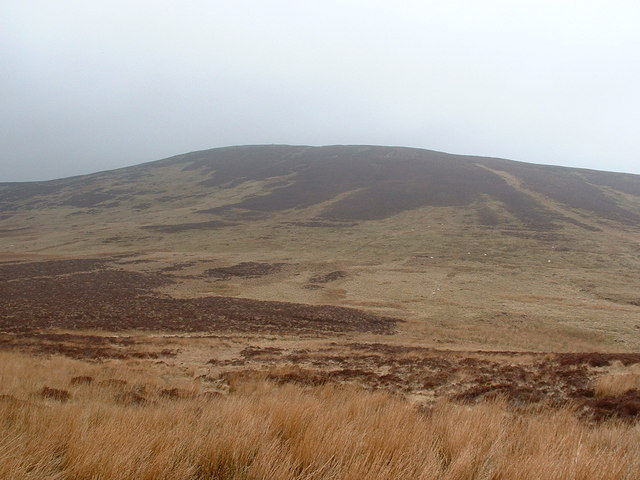
- Foel y Geifr from Bwlch Cwm Hirnant

Highest point
- Elevation: 626 m (2,054 ft)
- Prominence: 110 m (360 ft)
- Parent peak: Esgeiriau Gwynion
- Listing: Hewitt, Nuttall, HuMP
- Coordinates: 52°50′05″N 3°34′46″W

Geography
- Location: Gwynedd, Wales
- Parent range: Snowdonia
- Topo map: OS Landranger 115

Listed summits of Foel y Geifr
Name	Grid ref	Height	Status
Trum y Gwragedd		612 m (2,008 ft)	sub Hewitt, Nuttall

Foel y Geifr is a subsidiary summit of Esgeiriau Gwynion, and included in a group of hills known as the Hirnantau. These hills rise from the south east shores of Llyn Tegid (Bala Lake). Confusion arises when trying to establish to which mountain range these belong to. Since Foel y Geifr forms part of the Hirnant horseshoe, many consider it to be a Berwyn peak. However, geographically it belongs to the Aran Fawddwy group, its parent peak being Esgeiriau Gwynion. It is the eastern outpost of the Arans.

The summit is grassy and has a trig point, while the terrain surrounding the summit is heathery and boggy. The summit is the highest in a ridge that forms the western backwall of Cwm Hirnant. Two other summit lie along the ridge: Trum y Gwragedd and the Hewitt Foel Goch (Hirnant). To the south-west lies Moel y Cerrig Duon, to the east lies Pen y Boncyn Trefeilw and Cyrniau Nod.
