= Bwlch y Groes =

Mountain pass in Wales

Coordinates: 52°47′45″N 3°36′47″W

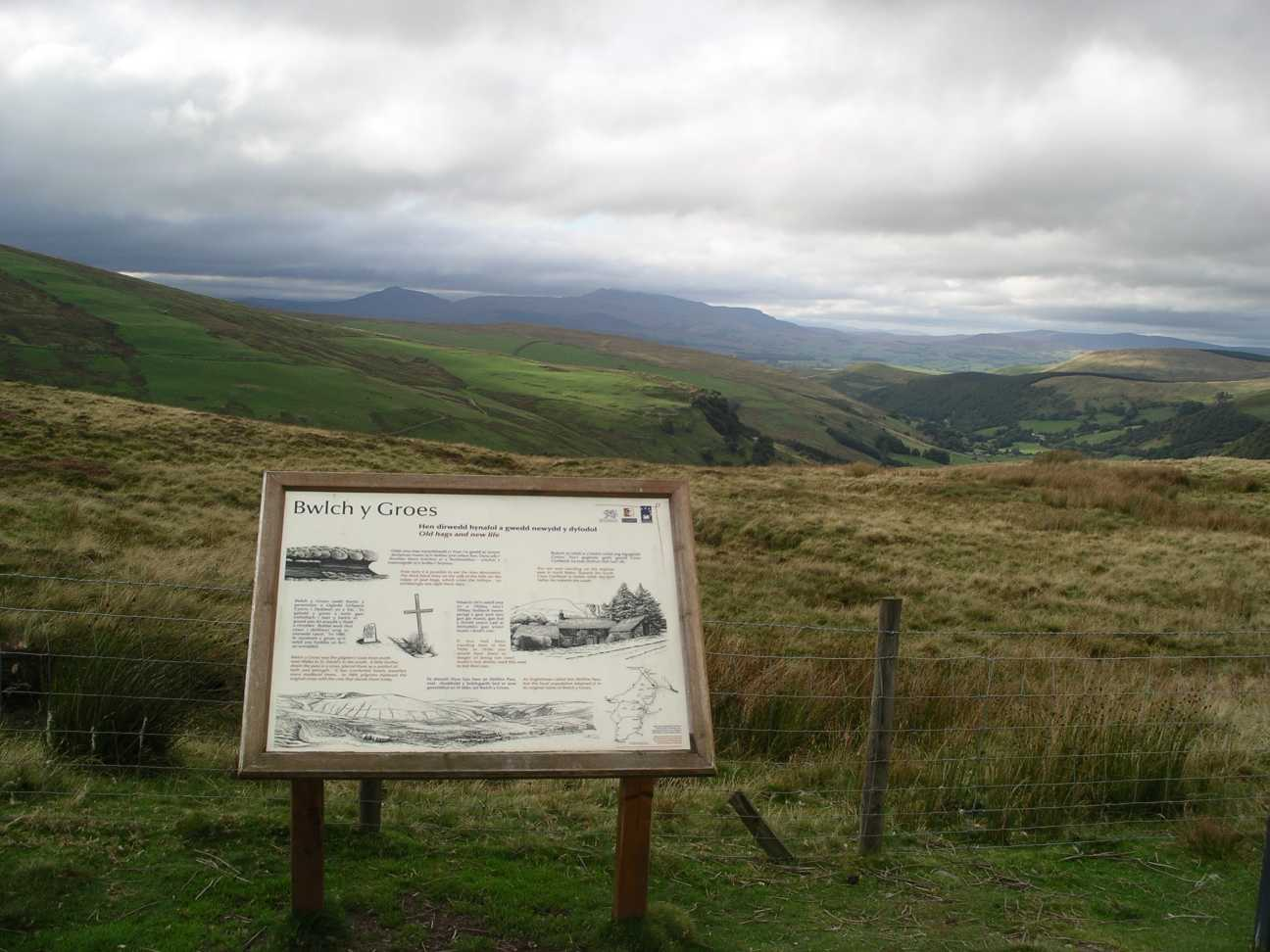
View from Bwlch y Groes looking west

Bwlch y Groes (Welsh for 'pass of the cross') is the second highest public road mountain pass in Wales, with a summit altitude of 545 metres (1,788 ft). Gospel Pass in south Wales is slightly higher. It lies on minor roads linking Dinas Mawddwy (via Llanymawddwy), Llanuwchllyn and Lake Vyrnwy. The view from the pass encompasses the plain of the Dyfi valley, Cadair Idris and a close view of Aran Fawddwy. The cross, just below the summit at the junction of the roads from Vyrnwy and from Dinas Mawddwy, commemorates the place of the pass on a pilgrim route from north Wales.

Bwlch y Groes, known by some as Hellfire Pass, was used between and after the wars by the Austin Motor Company and the Standard Triumph Motor Company to test prototype cars and their performance during hillclimbing. The British Motorcycle industry which was world beating before the wars also used the pass for testing. In 1926 BSA undertook a continual test resulting in the company being awarded by the Auto-Cycle Union the Maudes Trophy for 60 ascents of the pass. BSA won the award again in 1938 in relation to rides that took place including the Bwlch y Groes. Between 1933 and 1954 the International Six Days Trial passed over the Bwlch y Groes and its neighbouring roads along the Eunant and Cwm Hirnant. The southern ascent of the Bwlch y Groes, which is approximately 1.7 miles (2.7 km) long with severe gradients throughout (steepest 1 in 4), was renowned throughout the 1970s and 80s as the most challenging climb used in the Milk Race round-Britain cycle race. The ascent is included among the hundred greatest cycling climbs in Britain, being a remorseless ascent of about 350 m (1,150 ft) over a distance of about 3.5 km (2.2 mi).

There are several other locations in Wales with the same name, including Bwlchygroes, a village in Pembrokeshire near Boncath.

== See also ==
- List of highest paved roads in Europe
- List of mountain passes
- List of mountain passes of Wales
