= Glasgwm =

Mountain in Gwynedd, Wales

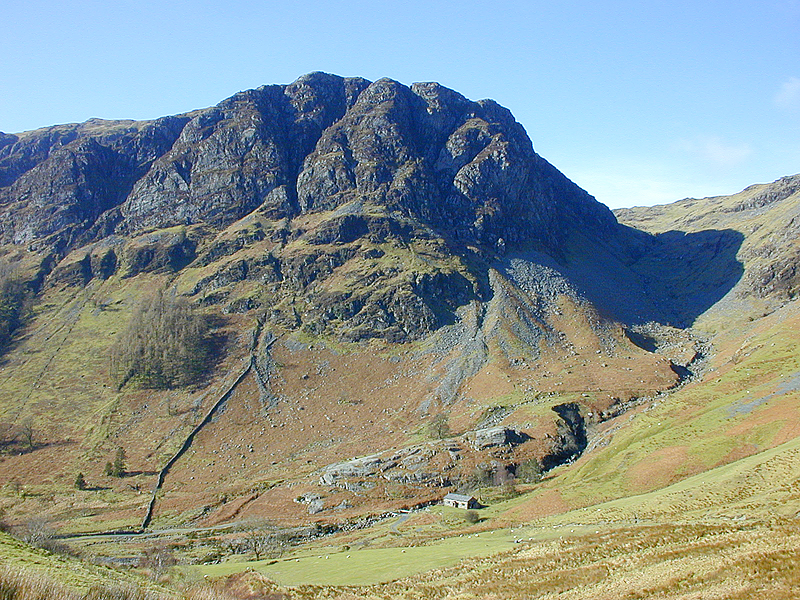
- Craig Cywarch, the southern face of Glasgwm

Highest point
- Elevation: 779 m (2,556 ft)
- Prominence: 215 m (705 ft)
- Parent peak: Aran Fawddwy
- Listing: Marilyn, Hewitt, Nuttall

Geography
- Location: Gwynedd, Wales
- Parent range: Snowdonia
- OS grid: SH836194
- Topo map: OS Landranger 124

Listed summits of Glasgwm
Name	Grid ref	Height	Status
Pen y Brynfforchog	SH817179	685 metres (2,247 ft)	Hewitt, Nuttall
Y Gribin	SH843177	600 metres (1,969 ft)	sub Hewitt

Glasgwm is a mountain in Gwynedd, Wales forming part of the Aran range in southern Snowdonia. It is one of the three Marilyns that make up the range, the others being Aran Fawddwy and Esgeiriau Gwynion. To the west is Maesglase and the Dyfi hills, while to the south-west lies Cadair Idris. To the south lies the Plynlimon range. It is 779 metres (2,556 ft) high.

Craig Cywarch makes up the south face of Glasgwm. Its crags are very popular with rock climbers. A mountaineering club hut is found at the foot of the cliffs.

Glasgwm's summit sits on a large rocky knoll marked by a cairn. The high altitude lake of Llyn y Fign lies adjacent to the summit, and is one of the largest bodies of water adjacent to a 700m+ summit in England and Wales.
