= Llanuwchllyn =

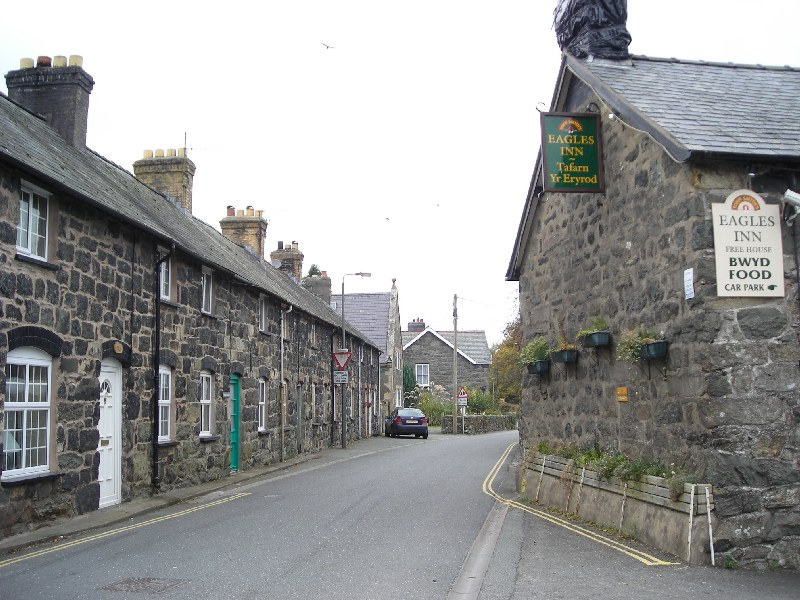
- Main street in 2007

- Location within Gwynedd
- Area: 116.93 km^{2} (45.15 sq mi)
- Population: 617 (2011)
  - Density: 5/km^{2} (13/sq mi)
- OS grid reference: SH877299
- Community: Llanuwchllyn
- Principal area: Gwynedd
- Country: Wales
- Sovereign state: United Kingdom
- Post town: BALA
- Postcode district: LL23
- Dialling code: 01678
- Police: North Wales
- Fire: North Wales
- Ambulance: Welsh
- UK Parliament: Dwyfor Meirionnydd
- Senedd Cymru – Welsh Parliament: Dwyfor Meirionnydd
- List of places UK Wales Gwynedd 52°51′20″N 3°40′11″W Map of the community

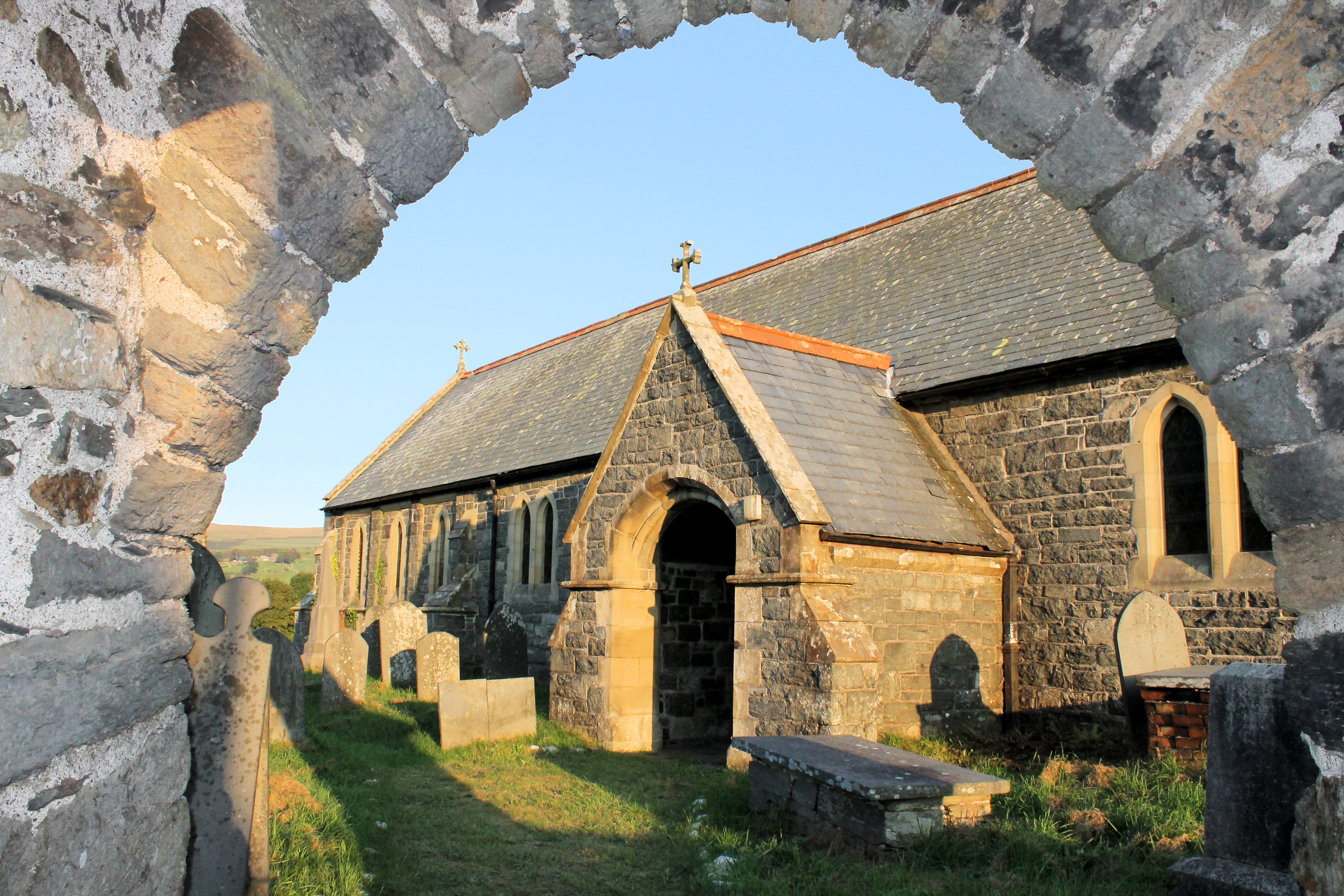
St Deiniol's Church

Medieval tomb at Llanuwchllyn

Llanuwchllyn (Welsh: [ɬaˈnɨ̞u̯χɬɨn]) is a village and community in Gwynedd, Wales, near the southern end of Llyn Tegid (Bala Lake). It is one of the most sparsely populated communities in Wales.

The electoral ward includes the small settlement of Llangywer.

The parish church of St Deiniol is a Grade II* listed building.

Llanuwchllyn railway station is the headquarters of the narrow gauge Bala Lake Railway, centred on the former Great Western Railway station on the standard-gauge line from Ruabon to Barmouth.

The village was the birthplace of Welsh language author and educationalist Owen Morgan Edwards.

Caer Gai, a Roman fort near Llanuwchllyn, was traditionally known as the home of Cei, the character in the Arthurian legend known in English as Sir Kay. Poets of the 15th century recorded a story, ultimately deriving from the Prose Merlin included in the Lancelot-Grail and the Post-Vulgate Cycle, that King Arthur and Cei were brought up at Caer Gai as foster brothers. Caer Gai is also Grade II* listed.

== Demographics ==
=== Welsh language ===
According to the 2011 Census, Llanuwchllyn is the community with the 2nd highest percentage of Welsh speakers in Wales. 83.5% of residents aged three and over reported being able to speak Welsh in the 2011 Census, as compared to 84.7% reporting being able to do so in the 2001 Census. The figure rose slightly to 83.9% by the 2021 Census.

=== Ethnicity ===
As of the 2021 Census, the Llanuwchllyn electoral ward was the least ethnically diverse ward in England and Wales. 99.2% of residents were White British, 0.2% were White Irish, 0.3% were White Other, and 0.3% were mixed race.

== Governance ==
An electoral ward with same name exists. This ward also includes the community of Llangywer with a total population taken at the 2011 census of 877.

== Notable people ==
- John Richards (1765–1850), schoolmaster, became an American politician in New York.
- Michael D. Jones (1822–1898) a Welsh Congregationalist minister, principal of a theological college and co-founder of the Welsh settlement of Y Wladfa in Patagonia.
- Griffith Davies (poet) (1868–1962), poet, farmer, and deacon
- Sir Owen Morgan Edwards (1858–1920) historian, educationalist and writer.
- John Meirion Morris (1936–2020), sculptor.
- Sir Robin Williams (born 1941), physicist
