= Pegwn Mawr =

Hill in Powys, Wales

Coordinates: 52.42003°N 3.43806°W

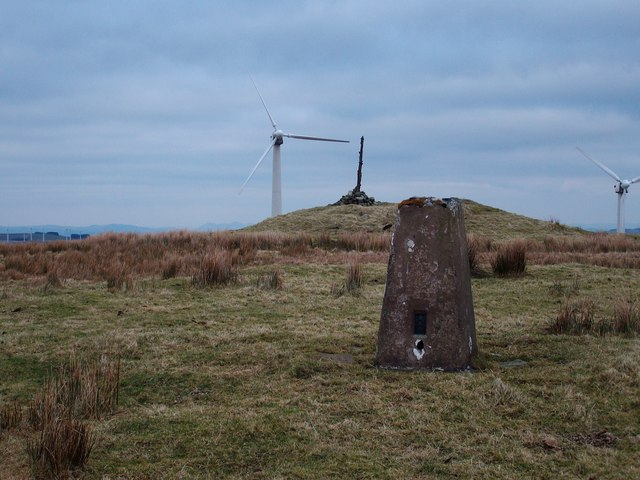

Highest point
- Elevation: 586 m (1,923 ft)
- Prominence: 300 m (980 ft)
- Parent peak: Plynlimon
- Listing: Marilyn

Naming
- English translation: Large pole
- Language of name: Welsh
- Pronunciation: Welsh: [ˈpɛɡʊn ˈmaur]

Geography
- Location: Powys, Wales
- Parent range: Cambrian Mountains
- OS grid: SO023812

Pegwn Mawr is a mountain in Powys, Mid Wales, east of Llanidloes. It is 586 m (1,922 ft) high. It is surrounded by a wind farm. There is a trig point (pictured)
