= Dyffryn Mymbyr =

Valley in Snowdonia, north-west Wales

Coordinates: 53.096536°N 3.950134°W

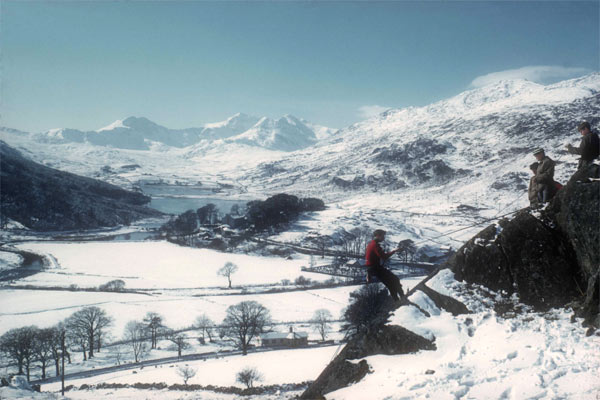
View from Y Pincin in Capel Curig, over the old Turnpike, St. Julitta's Church, Plas y Brenin, Moel Siabod on the left, Llynnau Mymbyr, Dyffryn Mymbyr, Nantygwryd and the Snowdon Horseshoe.

Dyffryn Mymbyr is a valley in Snowdonia, in north-west Wales, approximately 5 miles (8.0 km) in length, and leading up from Capel Curig to the Pen-y-Gwryd hotel.

The river Nantygwryd, originally called Y Mymbyr in Llywelyn the Great's charter of 1198, starts at Llyn Cwm-y-ffynnon, high above the Pen-y-Gwryd hotel, and flows into Llynnau Mymbyr going towards Capel Curig. The valley, like the river, lies both in Gwynedd and Conwy County Borough.

Today there are at least two active, hill rearing, sheep farms; Garth, featured in the 1967 BBC Wales documentary "Shepherds of Moel Siabod", and Cwm Farm.

The area commands excellent views of the Snowdon horseshoe, which (viewed left to right) takes in the peaks of Y Lliwedd, Snowdon (Yr Wyddfa), Crib Goch and Crib y Ddysgl.

The valley is the location of the Capel Curig weather station, which on many occasions has recorded the wettest weather in Wales .

== Dyffryn Mymbyr farm ==
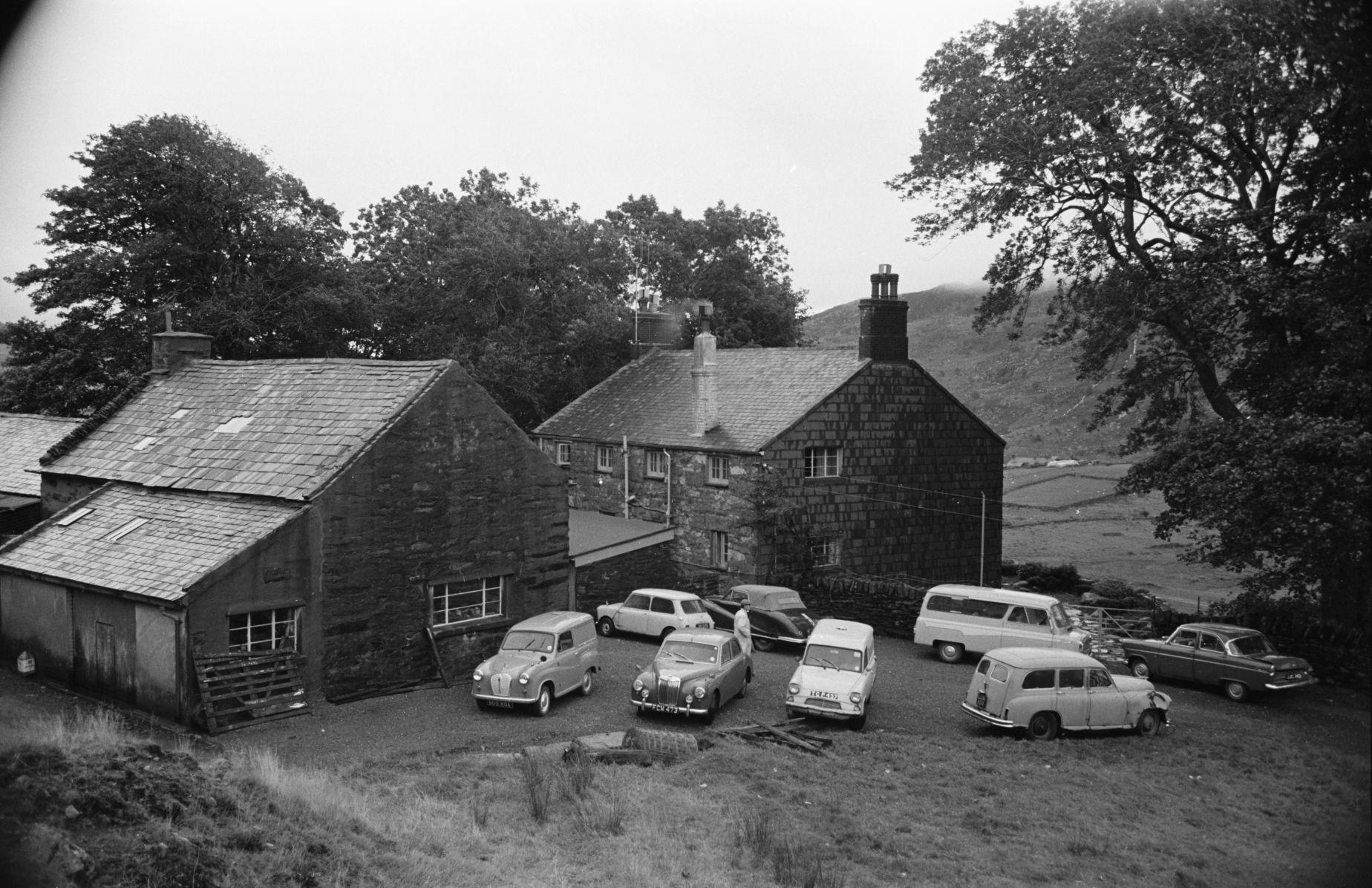
Dyffryn Mymbyr farm in 1965

Dyffryn Mymbyr is also the location of 'Dyffryn', the farm in Thomas Firbank's best-selling autobiographical novel (first published in 1940) entitled "I bought a mountain". In the book he describes life in Dyffryn Mymbyr after he bought the 2,400-acre (9.7 km^{2}) farm in 1931 when he was just 21. The farm included the southern slopes of the Glyders, and neither Firbank nor his wife, Esmé, whom he married in 1934, had any previous experience of farming. However, they succeeded in winning the respect of their employees and neighbours, and slowly built up a healthy stock of 3000 sheep. The couple later divorced, and Esmé (as Esmé Kirby: see her obituary) and her husband Peter Kirby went on to be founder members of the Snowdonia Society, the farm acting as home to the society before it moved to Tŷ Hyll ("The Ugly House"). The location of Dyffryn Mymbyr, the farm, dates back to 1350, and the current property is now owned by the National Trust. The farmhouse and cottage are now available to rent from the National Trust as holiday cottages; the money raised from their rental helps the National Trust with conservation work.

== Evan Roberts ==
Dyffryn Mymbyr can lay claim to one of the finest examples of a self-taught botanist, certainly in the UK, if not wider - Evan Roberts (Botanist). Evan Roberts lived at Gelli in Capel Curig where he lived and would explore all of Snowdonia, and in doing so compiled an unparalleled knowledge of the plant life in North Wales. Although he spent the first 40 years of his life as a quarry worker, he went on to become the colleague of academics. He was awarded the honorary degree of M.Sc. of the University of Wales, in 1956, at the same ceremony as the architect Frank Lloyd Wright, and his portrait was painted by Kyffin Williams.

== Geology ==
The valley contains the location of an unusual pisolitic ignimbrite. Very soon after eruption roughly spherical pilli – droplets of siliceous magma – of similar density to the ignimbrite fell into the still hot and fluid deposit. Later folding of the cooled and solid ignimbrite layer distorted the solidified pilli from spheres into elliptical shapes reflecting the structural changes undergone by the entire rock layer.

== Recreation & Sport ==
There are many walks in the valley, and also walks that lead out of the valley.

From Plas y Brenin an old path leads up and over Moel Siabod. This route goes past the old slate mine and then into hill farming country. The ascent of Moel Siabod affords commanding views of the entire valley.

In the 1990s Esmé Kirby established a low-level walk along the length of the valley, starting from and returning to Capel Curig, via Gelli, which used to be the stagecoach Inn before becoming the Capel Curig Hotel, again changing its name to the Royal Inn around 1870. It is now Plas y Brenin, the National Mountain Centre in Wales.

The "Heritage Walk", produced by the "Friends of St. Julitta's Church" in Capel Curig, circumnavigates the whole village and takes about 3 hours.

There is Moderate (Mod) to Very Difficult (V Diff) climbing on "The Racks" near Dyffryn Farm, "The Pinnacles" (Y Pincin to the locals) in the centre of Capel Curig.

The lake Llynnau Mymbyr is actively used for kayaking and canoeing both by Plas y Brenin and many local education authorities. The lake has also been used for fly fishing and sub-aqua courses, although these are no longer active. Some believe there are no fish in the lake, but this is incorrect. The fish are small but like most brown trout are very feisty when on the hook.

The Dragon Ski (The Welsh Junior & Senior Ski Team) used to train here every year, based at Plas y Brenin, using the dry ski slope, dry cross country ski slope, local footpaths as running tracks and the training pool.

The woods, surrounding hills, footpaths and forestry tracks are used for camping, walking and orienteering.
