= Llynnau Mymbyr =

Two lakes in Snowdonia, Wales

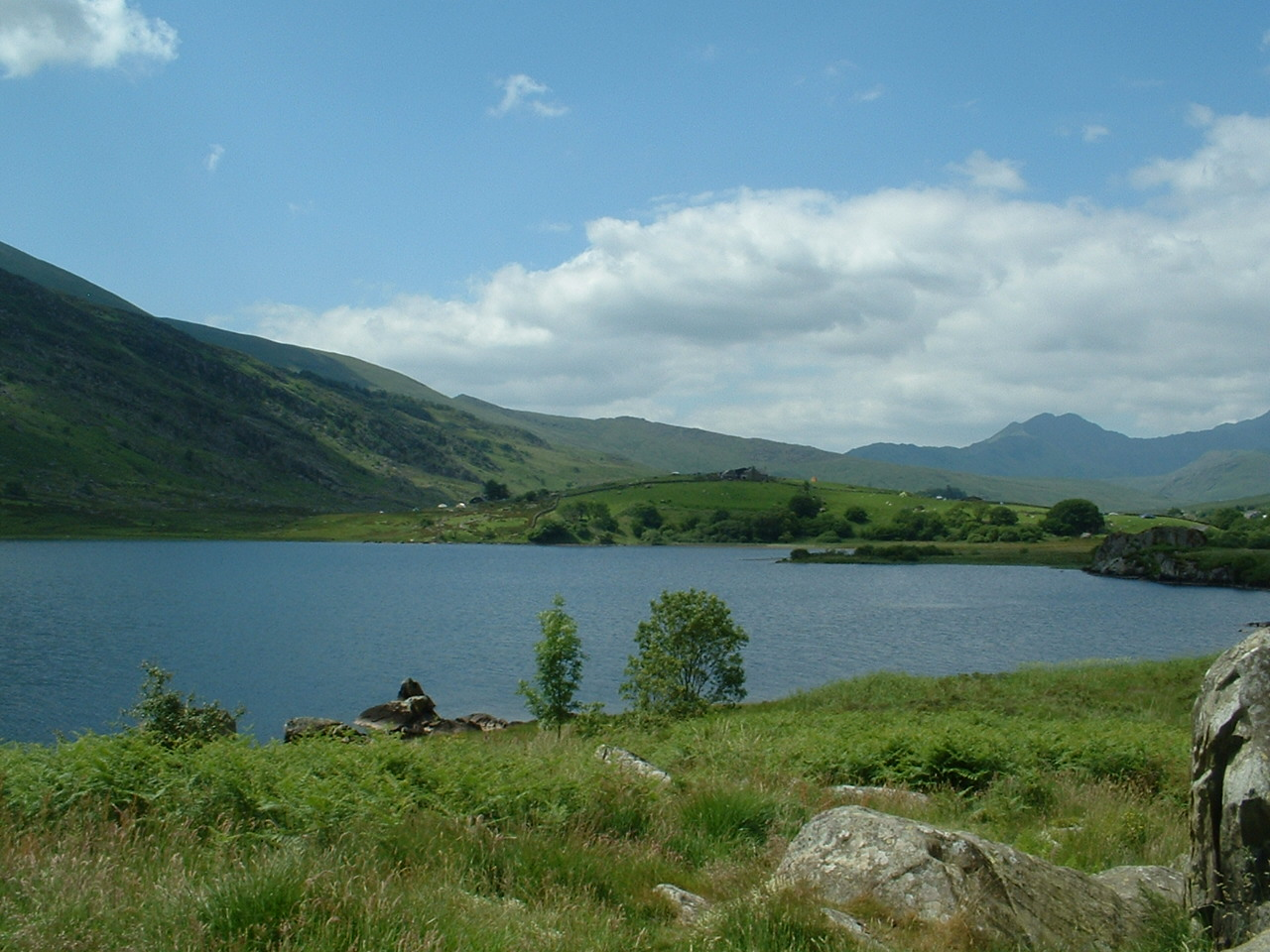
- from the A4086

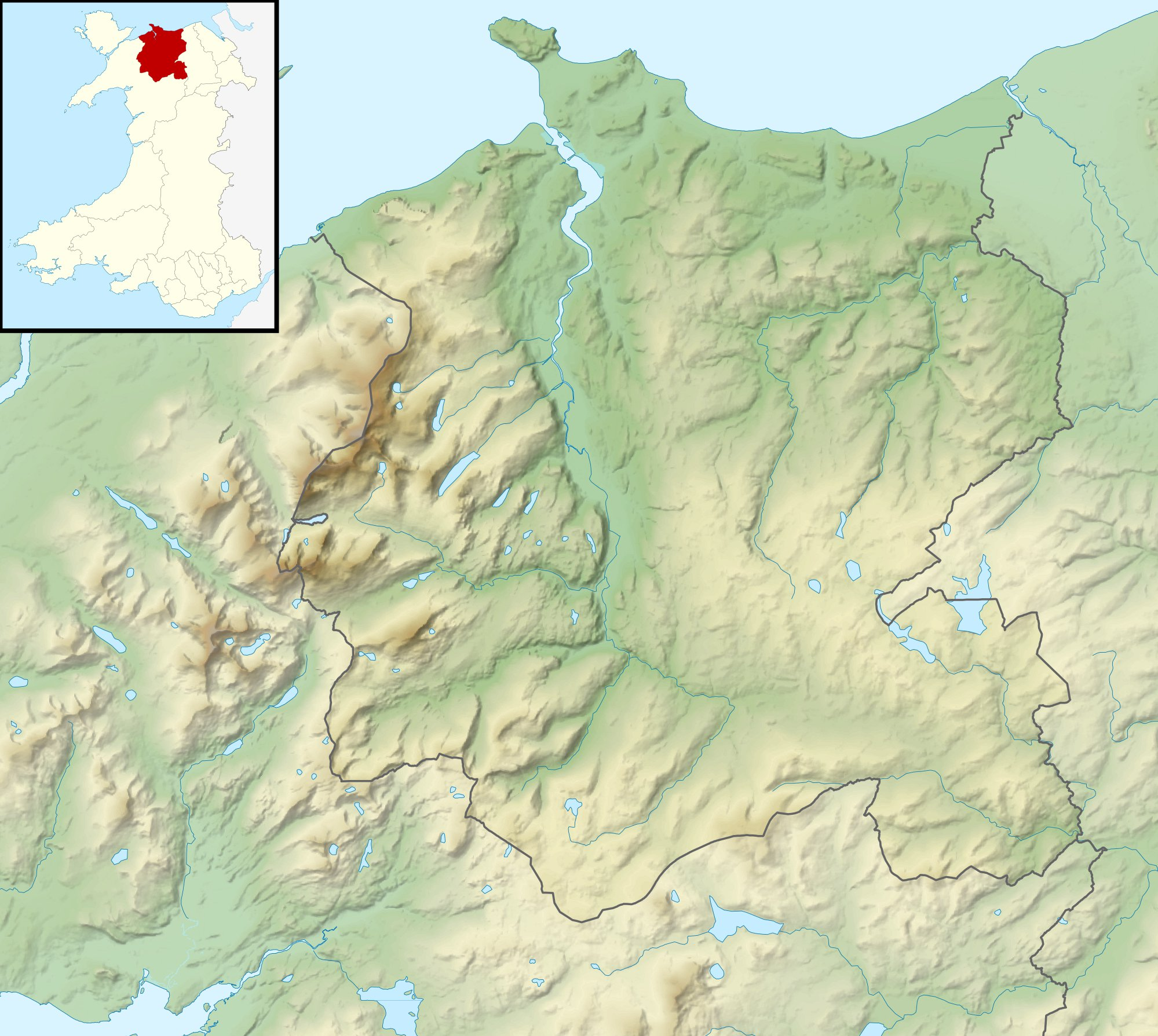
- Location within Conwy
- Location: Snowdonia, North Wales
- Coordinates: 53°5′53″N 3°55′47″W
- Type: natural
- Primary inflows: Nantygwryd
- Basin countries: United Kingdom
- Max. depth: 30 ft (9.1 m)

Llynnau Mymbyr are two lakes located in Dyffryn Mymbyr, a valley running from the village of Capel Curig to the Pen-y-Gwryd hotel in Snowdonia, north-west Wales. The A4086 runs along their northern banks.

Strictly speaking this is one lake, originally called Llyn Mymbyr, with a maximum depth of 30 feet. About 3/4 mile long in total, a delta has built up midway along the north shore, and this has to all purposes cut the lake in two - hence the plural name.

The river feeding the lakes is the Nantygwryd (or Nant-y-gwryd), which has its source at Llyn Cwm-y-ffynnon, also marked on maps as the Nant Gwryd, which is a tributary of the Afon Llugwy. The two rivers join at Capel Curig.

The lake was used for fly-fishing and sub-aqua courses in the 1960s and is still used today as a canoe training resource by Plas y Brenin and other local education authorities.

== Geographical and Geological Context ==
The lakes lie in a depression formed by a ring of sandstone called the Capel Curig Volcanic Formation which can be vaguely seen in the panorama below which was taken from the north side. The igneous rocks of Moel Siabod can be seen behind the lakes which are linear but in the panorama appear to bend at the delta between the two.

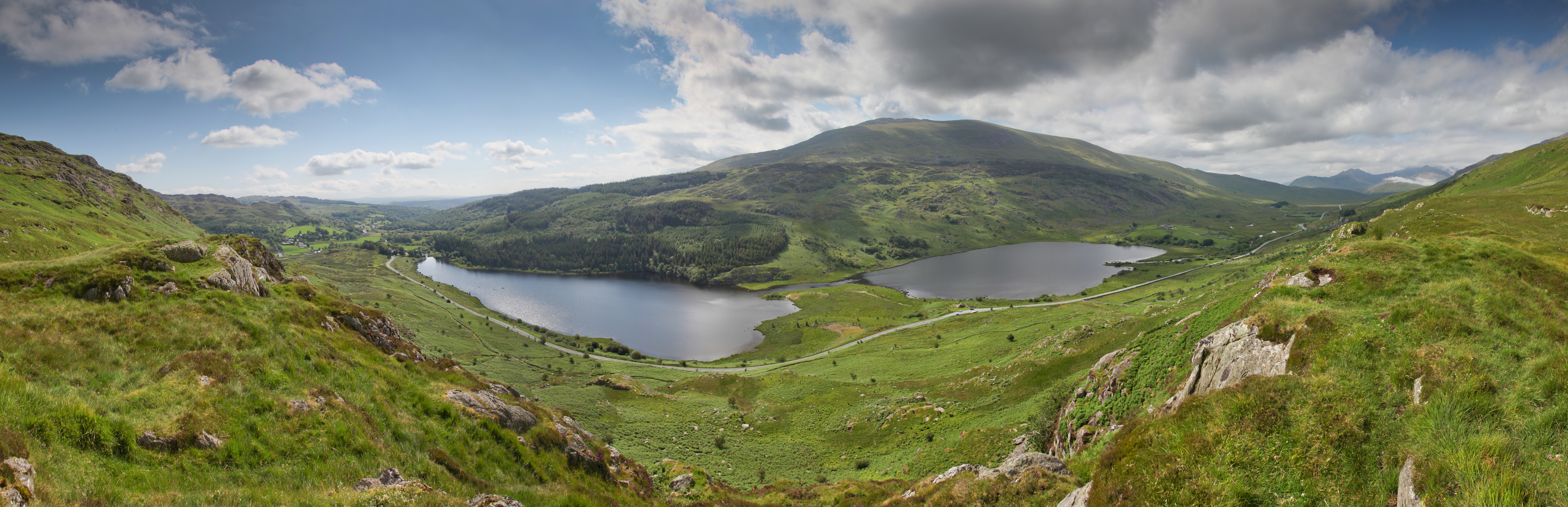
Llynnau Mymbyr from Creigiau Llynnau Mymbyr
