= Peter Nye =

British soil scientist

Peter Nye

Peter Hague Nye FRS (16 September 1921 – 13 February 2009) was a British soil scientist.

== Early life ==
Peter Nye was born on 16 September 1921 in Hove, Sussex where his father, Haydn Percival Nye, was a chartered surveyor. John Nye, the glaciologist, was his younger brother. Their mother, Jessie Hague, was a daughter of Anderson Hague, the landscape painter, hence Esmé Kirby, the Snowdonia conservationist, was a first cousin.

Nye was educated at Charterhouse School, Balliol College, Oxford and Christ's College, Cambridge.

== Career ==
After war work on delayed action detonators, Nye joined the British Colonial Service, and in 1947 was sent to the Gold Coast (now Ghana) as an Agricultural Officer. He became a Lecturer in Soil Science at the University College of Ibadan, Nigeria from 1950 to 1952, and then a Senior Lecturer in Soil Science at the University of Ghana from 1952 to 1960. Nye's work with Dennis Greenland in West Africa in the 1950s on soils under shifting cultivation challenged colonial agricultural orthodoxy and became a classic.

Following a year at the International Atomic Energy Agency in Vienna, Nye was a appointed Reader in Soil Science at the University of Oxford from 1961 to 1988, becoming a founding Fellow of St Cross College, Oxford. In Oxford, Nye pioneered mathematical modelling of the complex chemical interactions between plant roots and solutes in the surrounding soil. The resultant book, with P. B. Tinker, Solute movement in the soil-root system (1977, 2nd edn. 2000) is said to be "one of the most influential books across the whole of plant and soil sciences".

== Personal life ==
Nye's first marriage, to Dorothy Aron in 1948, ended in divorce after four years. In 1953 he married Phyllis Quenault, with whom he had three children. He died on 13 February 2009, survived by his wife, two children and six grandchildren.

Nye was a keen sportsman, playing tennis and squash for his university, and cricket for his college, when an undergraduate. In West Africa he played cricket for the national teams of both Nigeria and the Gold Coast. Later, in Oxford, he took up recreational canoeing and cycling.

== Awards and recognition ==
Nye was President of the British Society of Soil Science (1968–69), and a Member of the Council of the International Society of Soil Science (1968–74). He was elected a Fellow of the Royal Society in 1987. He was a visiting professor at Cornell University in 1974, 1981, and in 1989 when he was the Messenger Lecturer.

== Books ==
- P.H. Nye and D.J. Greenland (1960) The soil under shifting cultivation. Farnham Royal: Commonwealth Agricultural Bureaux
- P.H. Nye and P.B. Tinker (1977) Solute movement in the soil–root system. Oxford: Blackwell.
- P.B. Tinker and P.H. Nye (2000) Solute movement in the rhizosphere. New York: Oxford University Press.
