= Plas Menai =

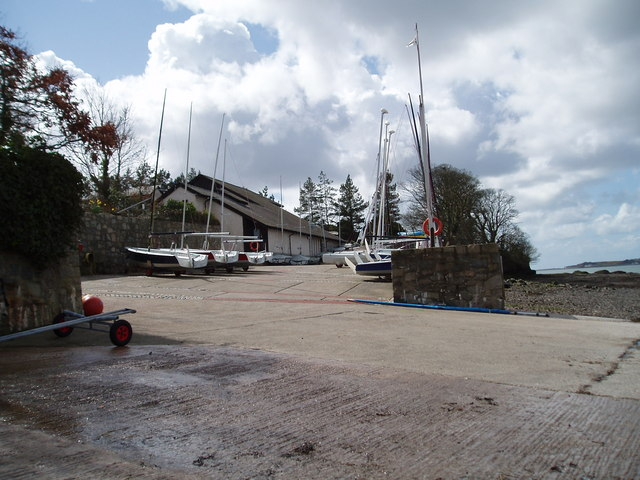
Plas Menai

Plas Menai is the national outdoor centre for Wales. It is situated on the mainland side of the Menai Strait, and is approximately 3 miles East of Caernarfon, North Wales.

== History ==
Opened in 1978 the facility was initially called "Plas y Deri" (Place of Oaks) before it was renamed to "Plas Menai" in 1980.

Plas Menai, even though it is governed by different bodies, is a complementary centre to Plas y Brenin, in that it is the major water-sports centre for Wales, however in the past it has undertaken mountain activities as well. John A Jackson was initially an advisor to Sport Wales but then became Plas Menai's first principal in 1978. The centre was fully functional even before phase II of the building was complete.

Like Plas y Brenin, Plas Menai was intended to have a dry ski slope, even to the extent of building a small hill, some 80 feet high, however this was eventually shelved at the request of business interests in Llandudno, which had its own quite lengthy dry ski slope and were somewhat negative about competition. However the latter assumption proved incorrect, dry ski slope usage has flourished in Wales. In 2006 the hill that was to be the dry ski slope was successfully converted into a mountain biking training facility and has been called "Trac Jackson" in memory of its first principal.

The architects Bowen Dann Davies Partnership won the Gold Medal for Architecture at the National Eisteddfod of Wales of 1985 for their work on Plas Menai.

== Current ==
Plas Menai is owned by Sport Wales and provides general and specialist training courses in sailing keel boats and dinghies. It also trains windsurfers, power boat operators and those taking up or improving their skills in canoeing and kayaking. Some non-aquatic training includes mountain sports and mountain biking.

A swimming pool on site is also open to the general public at specified times each day.

In February 2023, following an open tender process, Sport Wales have contracted Legacy Leisure to manage the day to day operations of the centre in a 10 year agreement. Legacy Leisure is a charitable body that forms part of the Parkwood Group.
