= Eastern Pinnacle Thajwas =

Mountain in India

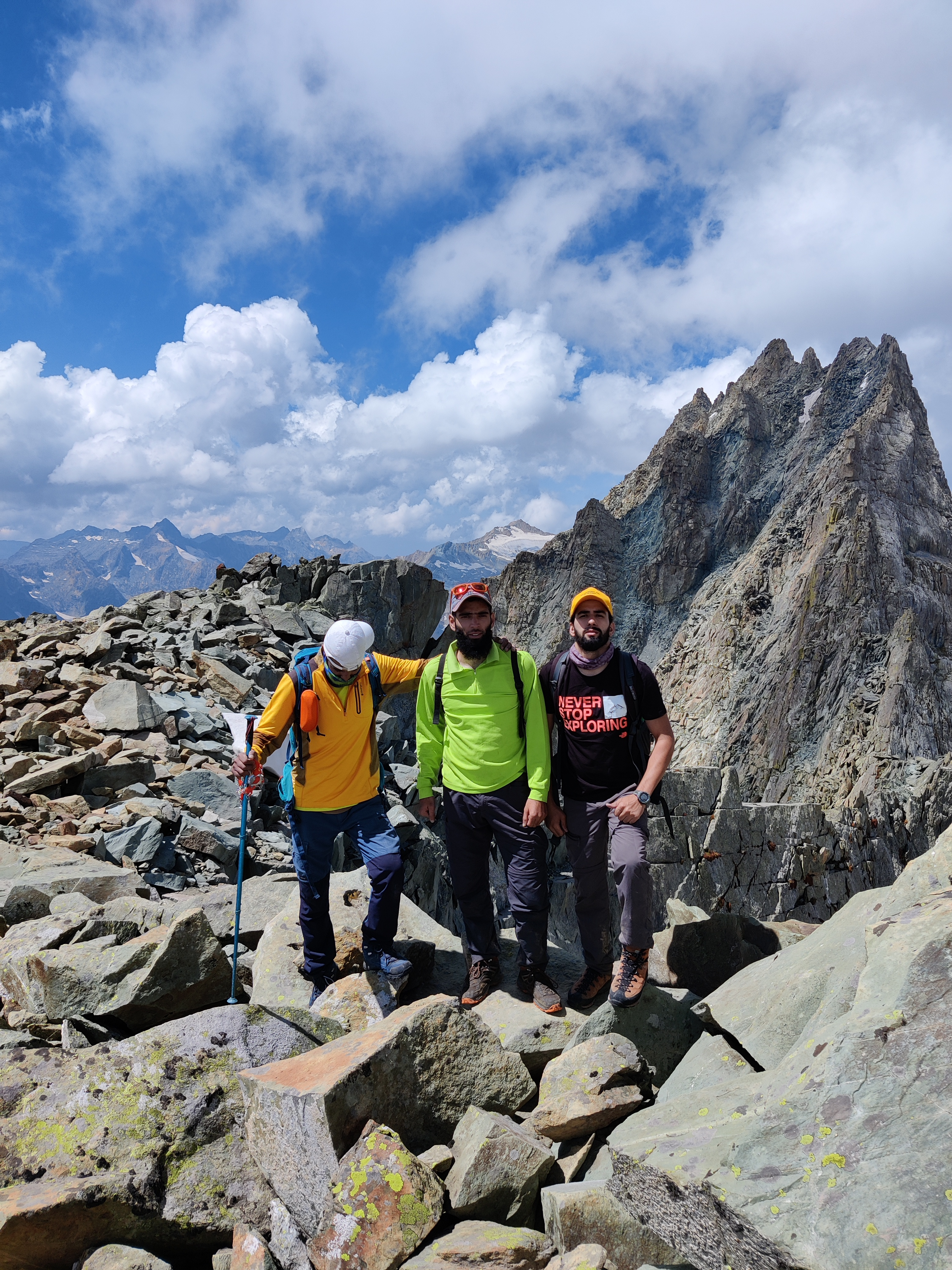
On the summit of Eastern Pinnacle with Central Pinnacle in backdrop

The Eastern Pinnacle Peak is a mountain peak that rests in the middle of the cluster of peaks around Thajiwas Area of Sonamarg. The peak is 15,610 feet (4,760 m) above sea level. In its vicinity, there are famous peaks of Kashmir like Valehead Peak and Umbrella Peak. The Eastern Pinnacle Peak was first scaled by J.A. Jackson, a famous English mountaineer and explorer, in 1945.

The peak was not summited again until 12 July 2020 when a group of Kashmiri Mountaineers belonging to Cliffhangers India summited it. The group was led by Mohammed Arif, the founder of Cliffhangers India, Junaid Ahmed, Nazir Raina and Nazir Jr. Soon after the opening of route of the peak, it was later climbed by Inayat ullah bhat and Aijaz Raina on 9th oct 2020.

Zeeshan Mushtaq, Owais Shamsi, Zahid Sofi, and Faisal Wani scaled it on September 5 of the next year in 2021. A few weeks later, a group led by Aneeqa Khalid also ascended it. After team Cliffhangers, there have been a lot of ascents.
