= Llyn Cwm-y-ffynnon =

- Fynnon Mymbyr
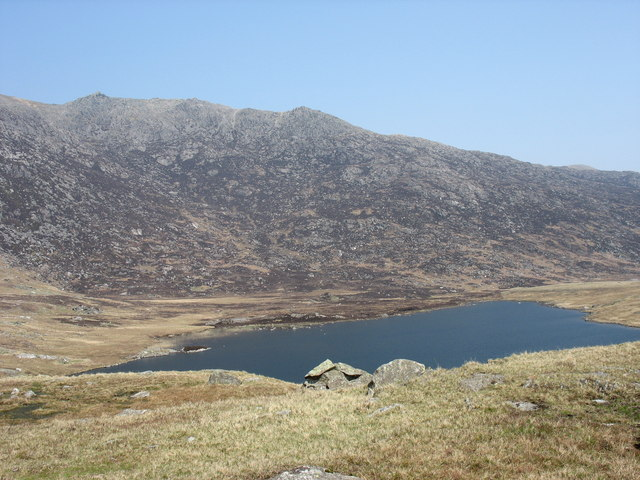
- Llyn Cwm-y-ffynnon

- Location within Wales
- Location: Snowdonia, Wales
- Coordinates: 53.086°N 4.019°W
- Type: lake

Llyn Cwm-y-ffynnon is a lake in Snowdonia, below the summit of Moel Berfedd in Cwmffynnon. The lake's original name was Fynnon Mymbyr as outlined in Llywelyn ap Iorwerth's charter of 1198. As the name suggests, the lake nestles in a short valley, a cwm, high above the Pen-y-Gwryd hotel. The lake is the source of the Nantygwryd (originally Y Mymbyr) river which in Welsh translates to Pen-y-Gwryd.

Prior to 1198 the name Gwryd did not exist in the Mymbyr Valley or Dyffryn Mymbyr. This would suggest that the name "Gwryd" has appeared at a later date for whatever reason, for which there is limited data.

The river which flows from here forms part of the county boundary between Gwynedd and Conwy county borough.
