= Esmé Kirby =

Welsh conservationist

Esmé Kirby (born Esmé Cummins, 31 August 1910, Croydon; died 18 October 1999, Snowdonia) was a conservationist who formed the Snowdonia National Park Society in 1958 to ensure the mountains would be protected from future development. Her parents were Tancred Cummins and Dora Hague. Her father moved the family to Deganwy in North Wales to build the North Wales Golf Club in 1894. Her maternal grandfather was the Victorian artist Joshua Anderson Hague and her uncle was also a well-respected artist, Anderson (Dick) Hague. After she finished her education at Arne Hall School in Llandudno, she became an actress and then a horse riding instructor.

In 1934 she married Thomas Firbank, whose bestseller I Bought a Mountain describes their life at the hill farm Dyffryn Mymbyr during the 1930s. In 1938, they walked the Welsh 3000s, 14 peaks over 3000 feet, in 9 hours, 29 minutes, setting the women's record at that time. After her husband enlisted for World War II, he never returned to the farm and left her to manage it alone. She lived there for the rest of her life and is buried on the hillside. She left the farm to the National Trust.

The Snowdonia National Park Society became The Snowdonia Society in 1968. Kirby, along with her second husband, Major Peter Kirby, led the society in conservation efforts to establish walking paths and remove eyesores. They bought Tŷ Hyll (The Ugly House) to become the headquarters for the society and remodelled the gardens. But subsequently there was a falling out with the society's committee, and in 1991 she was ousted as chairman. In response, she immediately established the Esmé Kirby Snowdonia Trust. In 1997, in order to re-establish the red squirrel on Anglesey, she initiated the eradication of grey squirrels , building a partnership of like-minded people from within the local community. Today, the grey squirrel is absent from Anglesey and the island contains the largest red squirrel population in Wales.
