= Joshua Anderson Hague =

British painter (1850–1916)

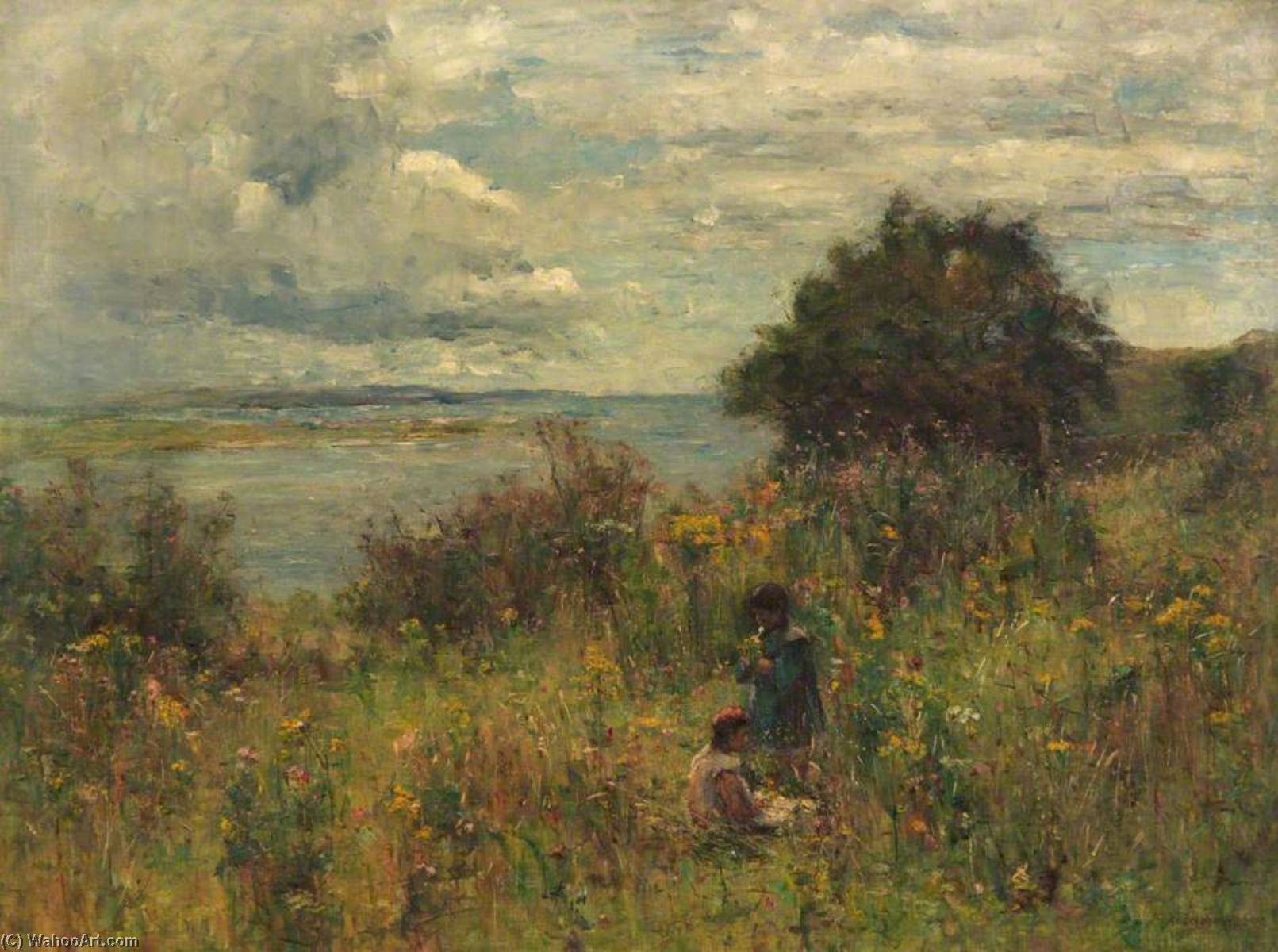
Summer Flowers by Joshua Anderson Hague

Joshua Anderson Hague (1850–1916) is recognized as an important Victorian painter of scenery in the Welsh countryside. He was a founding member and vice president of the Royal Cambrian Academy of Art.

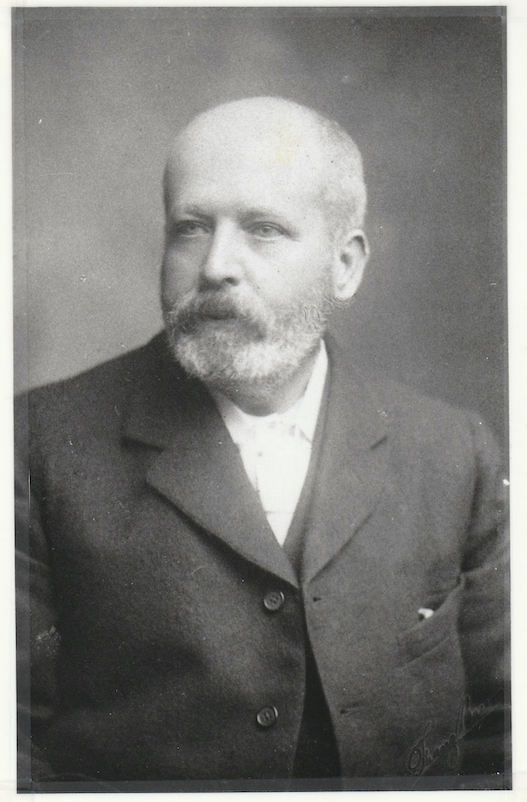
Joshua Anderson Hague

On his birth certificate, he was named Joshua Hague, born in Rusholme, then near (but now within) Manchester, England on June 17, 1850, to Jonathan Hague and Mary Hague, née Anderson. Some time later he added Anderson as a tribute to his mother's family. (He always used "Anderson Hague" to sign his paintings.) When he was seven, a pistol exploded in his right hand, shattering bones and causing significant damage. Nevertheless, he left school to enroll in the Manchester School of Fine Arts at age 13. Eventually, he and five friends left the school in protest at the instruction methods there. They then enrolled in the Manchester Academy to continue their art education. When he was 22, he spent the summer of 1872 at the artists' colony at Pont-Aven in Brittany, France, painting rural landscape scenes.

On his return, now known as "Anderson", he had his first three paintings exhibited at the Royal Academy in London in 1873: "Bathers", "Evening at Tal-y-Cafyn", and "Orchard at Roe Wen". Eventually, he had 47 paintings shown there.

He was a member of many art societies:

- Manchester Academy of Fine Art, 1871
- Manchester Art Club, 1879
- Limmers Club, 1880
- Royal Cambrian Academy of Art, 1882
- Royal Society of British Artists, 1884
- New English Art Club, 1887
- Royal Institute of Painters in Watercolours, 1889
- Royal Institute of Oil Painters, 1892

He moved with his wife, Sarah Henshall, to North Wales in 1878, because the rural scenery was ideal for his style of painting. They built the family home, Vadre, in Deganwy, for their family of four sons and two daughters. Their second eldest son Anderson Hague (called Dick) also had talent as a painter; their granddaughter Esmé Kirby became known as a conservationist of the Welsh countryside and founder of the Snowdonia National Park Society.

Anderson's landscape paintings were remarkable for their portrayal of the natural beauty surrounding the Conwy Valley, with picturesque skies, streams, fields, cottages and seascapes. He and his fellow artists were derided as the "Manchester School" because of their use of a palette knife to apply paint thickly on the canvas, instead of brushes. They adopted the term as a source of pride among themselves. Anderson Hague was one of the seven founding members of the Royal Cambrian Academy of Art in 1881 and he became vice president in 1913. He was one of the few English painters at the International Exhibition in Paris 1889, winning a silver medal and having his work hung in the Salon.

Anderson died at his home on Christmas Eve 1916. He is buried at St. Hilary's Church, Llanrhos with his wife (who died earlier that same year) and their son, William (who died during World War II). Next to the grave is that of his best friend, the artist Frank Longshaw. Three years after his death, Manchester City Art Gallery held a memorial exhibit showing 97 of his paintings.
