= Pen-y-Pass =

Mountain pass in Gwynedd, Wales

Coordinates: 53.08043°N 4.02135°W

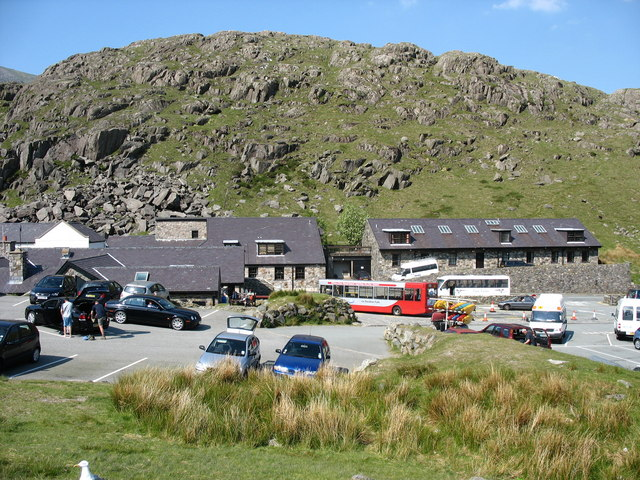
- The youth hostel and cafe complex viewed from across the car park
- Interactive map of Pen-y-Pass
- Elevation: 359 metres (1,180 ft)

Third Approach
- Location: Snowdonia, Gwynedd, north-west Wales

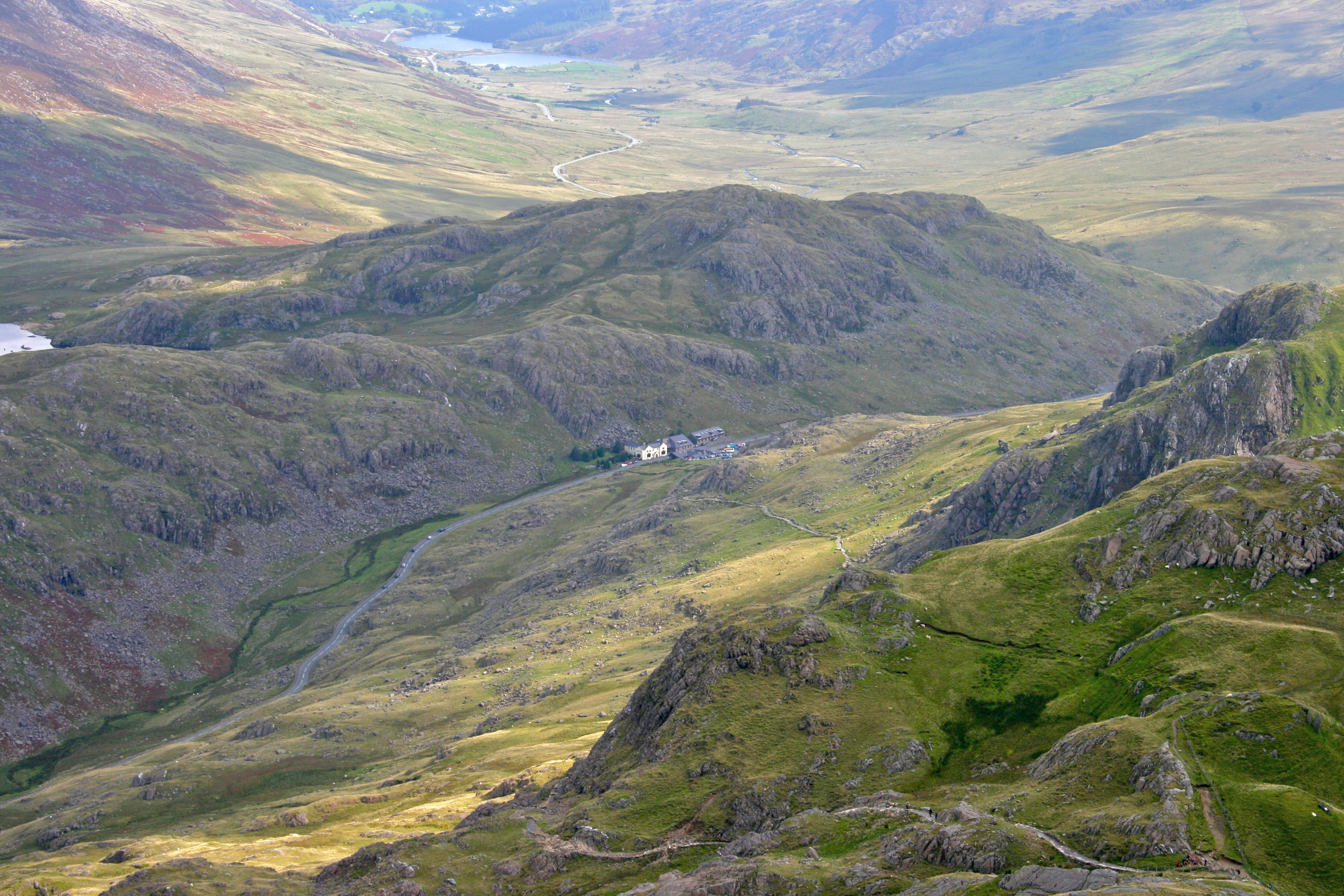
Pen-y-Pass from Crib Goch

Pen-y-Pass is a mountain pass in Snowdonia, Gwynedd, north-west Wales. It is a popular location from which to walk up Snowdon, as three of the popular routes (the Miners Track, the Pyg Track and the ascent via Crib Goch) can be started here. Glyder Fawr, to the north, is also accessible from here.

Situated at the high point of the Llanberis Pass at an elevation of 359 metres (1,178 ft) – about a third of the height of Snowdon – the road was built in the 1830s to allow ore from the mines on Snowdon to be transported to Llanberis. It would be taken down the Miners Track to a store-house at Pen-y-Pass first. Previously, the miners had had to move the ore over the Snowdon summit and down to Beddgelert.

The Llanberis pass road extends beyond Pen-y-Pass to join the Beddgelert-to-Capel Curig road at the Pen-y-Gwryd hotel. That notable climbing hotel was used as a base by Sir John Hunt, Baron Hunt and his team whilst training for the successful 1953 expedition to Mount Everest and equipment and autographs from that and other expeditions may be seen in the Everest Room.

The former Gorphwysfa Hotel at Pen-y-Pass is now a youth hostel, bar and café operated by YHA, and opposite is an information centre and café and a Snowdonia National Park-run car park. There is also a car park halfway down Llanberis Pass in Nant Peris village as well as others in Llanberis village. There is a park and ride bus service to Pen-y-pass car park, which is the hub of the year-round Sherpa bus network with links Pen-y-Pass to Llanberis, Capel Curig, Betws-y-Coed, Beddgelert, Porthmadog, Rhyd Ddu and Waunfawr.
