= Snowdonia Society =

Welsh environmental charity

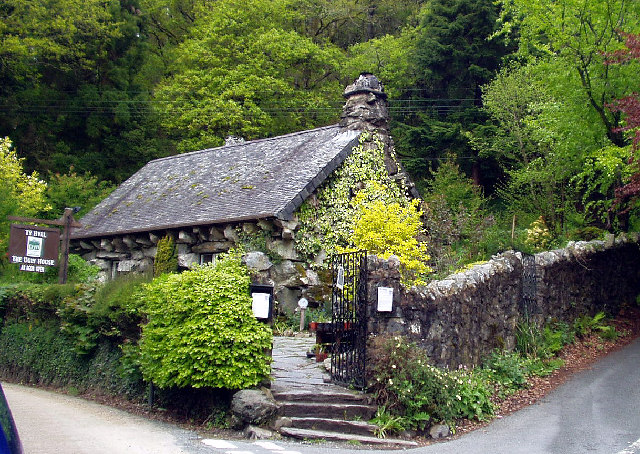
The Ugly House, the former headquarters of the Snowdonia Society.

The Snowdonia Society (Welsh: Cymdeithas Eryri) is a members based environmental charity working to protect and enhance the beauty and special qualities of Snowdonia and to promote their enjoyment in the interests of all who live in, work in or visit the area both now and in the future.

Formed in 1967 by Esmé Kirby, a team of volunteers undertake practical conservation which makes a difference to Snowdonia: clearing litter, maintaining footpaths, tackling invasive species and improving habitats for wildlife. The Society campaigns to protect Snowdonia's special qualities from threats such as inappropriate development or erosion of its natural and cultural heritage. The Society also organises a programme of walks and talks, publishes a bi-annual magazine, and offers training in conservation and flora and fauna ID.

Membership is open to all with an interest in Snowdonia and can be obtained via the Society's website, or by contacting their office at Brynrefail, Gwynedd.

The Snowdonia Society owns Tŷ Hyll (English: The Ugly House), which is located on the A5 between Betws-y-coed and Capel Curig. This house is reputed to be a "tŷ unnos", i.e. it was built overnight in order to establish legal ownership. Tŷ Hyll and its gardens and woodland are open to the public; until 2011 the Society's offices were located here. A teashop now occupies the ground floor and there is a honeybee and pollinator exhibition upstairs.

The policies of the Society are decided by its elected executive committee. The Society's paid staff support the charity's honorary officers and manage projects in areas such as waste reduction, energy efficiency and practical conservation.

== See also ==
- Dyffryn Mymbyr
