= Llyn-y-Foel =

Lake in Snowdonia, Wales

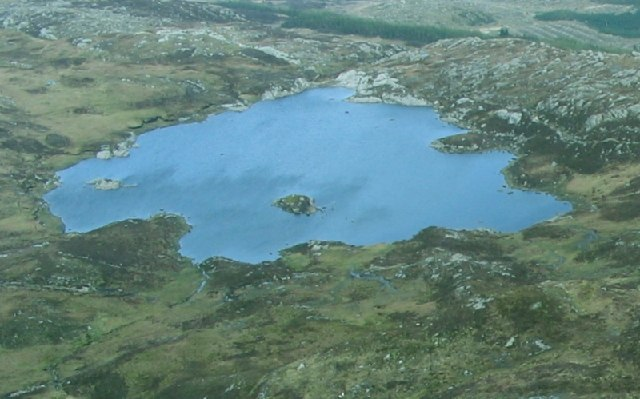

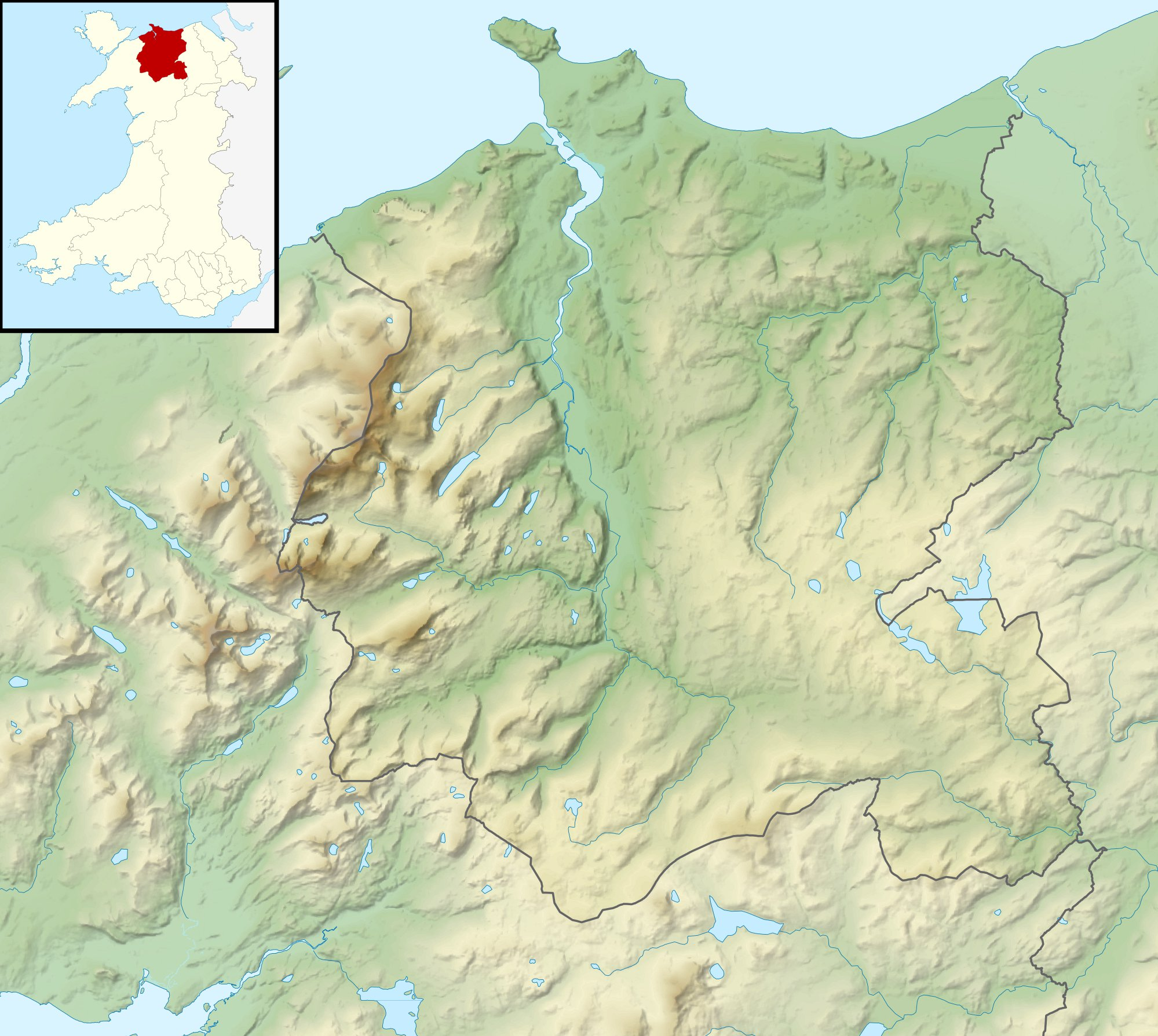
- Location within Conwy
- Location: Snowdonia, Wales
- Coordinates: 53.07313°N 3.91949°W
- Type: natural
- Basin countries: United Kingdom
- Max. length: 240 m (790 ft)
- Max. width: 120 m (390 ft)
- Max. depth: 2 m (6 ft 7 in)
- Surface elevation: 535 m (1,755 ft)

Llyn-y-Foel (Welsh for 'lake of the mountain') is a lake in Snowdonia, Wales. It is approximately 240 m across, 120 m wide and up to 2 m deep. It lies at 535m altitude at the foot of the main ridge of Moel Siabod at grid reference SH 714 547.

The main outflow, at the south-east of the lake, forms one of the main tributaries of Afon Ystumiau, which eventually feeds into Afon Lledr and subsequently into Afon Conwy.

The deep brown colour of the water, caused by the peat in the immediate area, gives rise to a unique type of brown trout which can only be found in this lake.

Although the lake bears the name Llyn y Foel, it does have another name - Llyn Llygad yr Ych, the Lake of the Ox's Eye - which recounts a tale about an ox that lost an eye under the strain of pulling the dreadful afanc from Betws y Coed to Glaslyn below Snowdon. See Perrin, Jim. Visions of Snowdonia (London: BBC Books, 1997) ISBN 0-563-38302-X.
