= Evan Roberts (botanist) =

Welsh botanist and conservationist

Evan Roberts (1909 – May 1991) was a Welsh botanist and conservationist.

Evan Roberts was an internationally known and recognised botanist, who lived and worked all his life in Capel Curig (Gelli), in Snowdonia, Gwynedd, North Wales.

Roberts worked as a quarryman until the age of 44, when silicosis forced him to retire. He was later employed by the Nature Conservancy Council as warden of Cwm Idwal.
