= Tŷ unnos =

Welsh tradition about land ownership

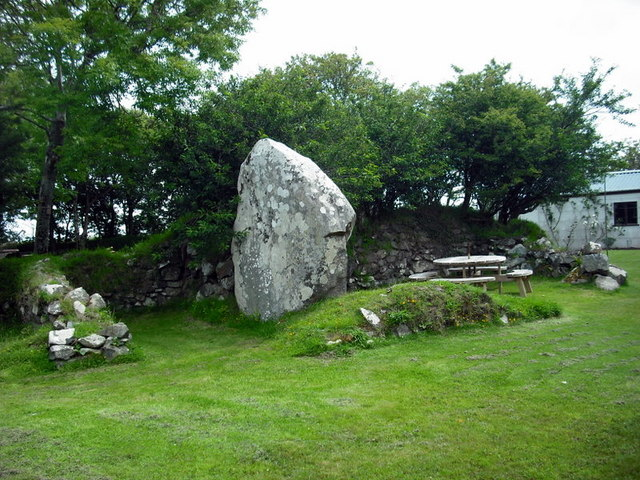
A ruined tŷ unnos construction

Tŷ unnos (pl.: tai unnos; English: 'one-night house', also hafodunnos) is an old Welsh tradition that has parallels in other folk traditions in other areas of the British Isles. It was believed by some that if a person could build a house on common land in one night, the land then belonged to them as a freehold. There are other variations on this tradition, for example that the test was to have a fire burning in the hearth by the following morning and the squatter could then extend the land around by the distance they could throw an axe from the four corners of the house.

== Origins ==
From a period spanning the 17th to the beginning of the 19th centuries, the expansion of the Welsh population combined with poverty brought about a series of incidents of squatting on isolated patches of land in the most rural parts of Wales. The practice arose because of the pressure of the lack of land due to the land enclosures of the period, and the taxation laws established by landowners. Family units paid taxes based on the land they inhabited, so families with adult and married children faced paying additional taxes on a second home, even if it was on the same land.

== Legal status ==
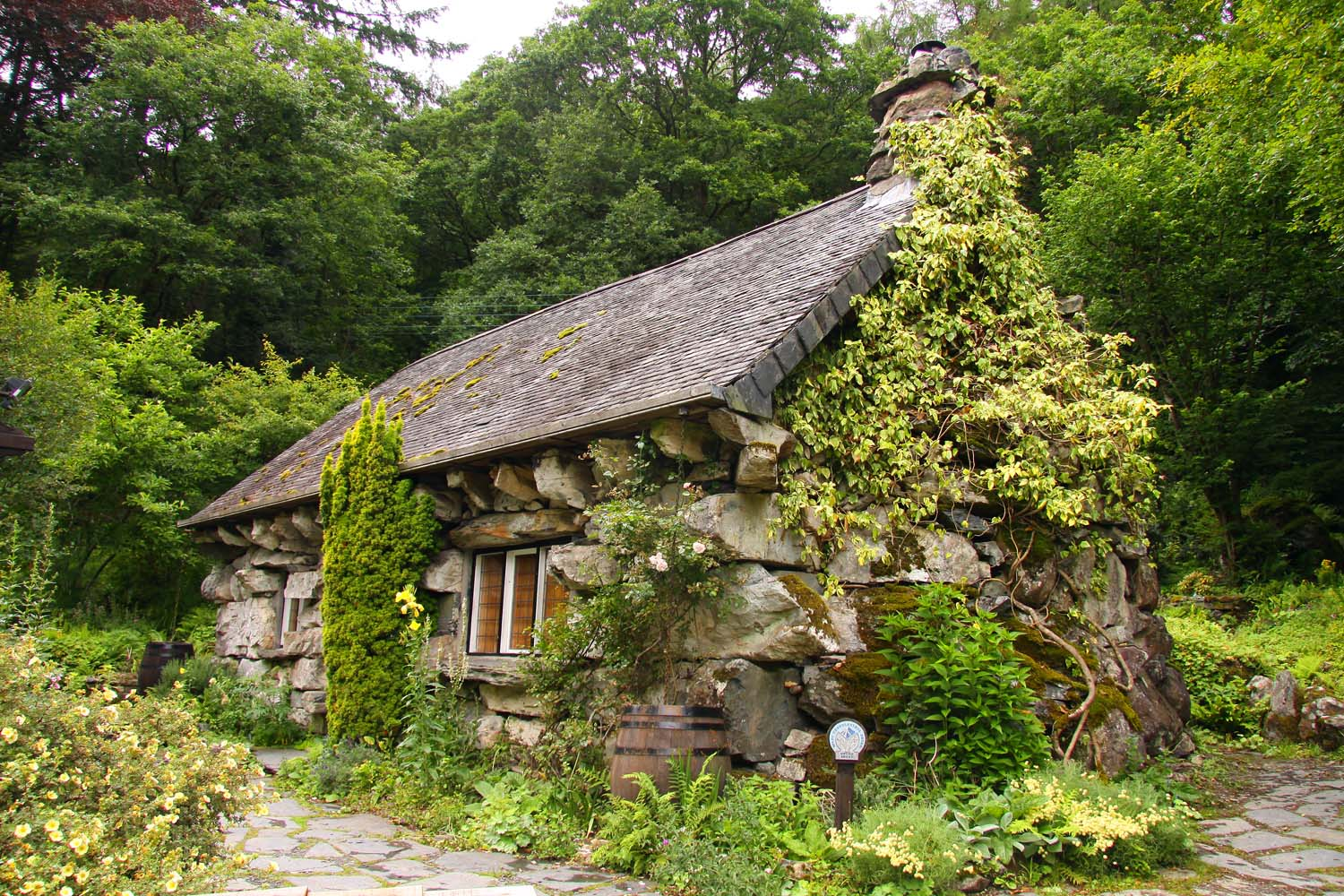
The Ugly House (Welsh: Tŷ Hyll) near Betws-Y-Coed, claimed to be an example of a tŷ unnos.

The tŷ unnos has no status in English common law (the legal code which applied to England and Wales in this period), although there is some tradition of legal discussion about the point at which land occupied by squatters without title may be regarded as a legitimate possession. This legendary belief may bear some relation to genuine folk customs and actual practices by squatters encroaching on common or waste land. The tradition may have provided squatters with a sense that their actions enjoyed some legitimacy conferred by an older code of laws more in tune with values of social justice than the supposed "Norman yoke". The customary practice has no foundation in the Common Law regarding land usage as it applies in England and Wales.

Many localities in Wales and England have a house or houses which may be identified as a one night house in local folklore. These may in fact be properties that were originally built by squatters and may be constructed in a vernacular building tradition using locally available materials. The Ugly House (Tŷ Hyll) is claimed to be an example in Snowdonia.

Many of these legends seem to be passed on in ignorance of the broader tradition of the one night house and may feature picturesque details based on variants of the traditions noted above. These legends generally take the form of a prominent member of local society proposing a wager with a landless family that members who could raise a house in a night and a day could keep the property. Some versions of these legends may emphasise that the family may cheat and win out over the complacent authority figure by building a very small hut or by simply building a hearth and chimney.

A good general account of one night house traditions is provided in the book Cotters and Squatters, by the British anarchist and writer on housing issues, Colin Ward. Ward considers the one night house tradition in the context of squatting and other informal systems of occupying and using land and relates accounts from England, Ireland, Scotland and Wales, which demonstrate clear parallels in different folk traditions. He observes that similar traditions exist in Turkey, France, and North and South America.

== Architectural development ==
Very little is known in detail about the building of these structures, their numbers or inhabitants, and no accurate representations survive. Most tai unnos were originally made of turf and soil, with a roughly thatched roof. Once established, the walls were often replaced with local materials, including clay and stone. An experimental construction in Carmarthenshire in 2006 demonstrated that a rudimentary structure could be assembled quickly. The squatters may not have depended exclusively on agriculture and in some areas may have worked in quarries and mines. This development led to dispersed settlement patterns seen in the Welsh landscape today. Materials from early stages of construction may have been replaced by higher quality timber and slates, available via the new railways. Single-storey tŷ unnos cottages were modified by raising the roofs and enlarging the windows.

The most recent known tŷ unnos was built in 1882 by four brothers in Flintshire. Oliver Onions fictionalized the story in his 1914 novel Mushroom Town.

== As a name for modular housing ==
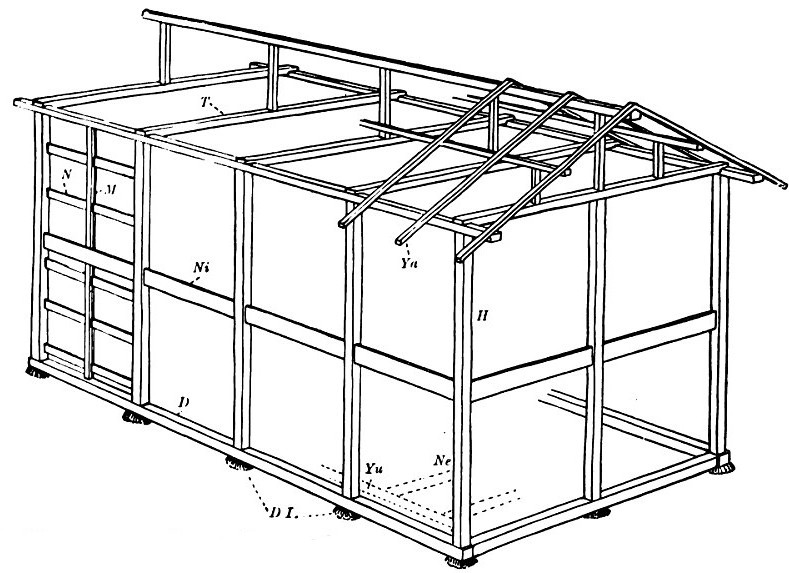
The Coed Cymru tŷ unnos design looks similar to this traditional Japanese framing design, but it lacks the internal horizontal members, has fewer vertical members (such that the side openings are square), and lacks king posts and queen posts. It uses glulam, and is clad with oriented strand board (Note: from image in BBC source)

The tŷ unnos concept has been used as an inspiration for low-cost modular housing systems. The Welsh woodland charity Coed Cymru used Tŷ Unnos as a name for a house design using local materials. In 2009, they were invited to show the design in Washington, D.C., as part of the 2009 Smithsonian Folklife Festival, which showcased Wales.

== See also ==
- Gecekondu
- Shanty town
- Favela

== Bibliography ==
- Iorwerth C. Peate, The Welsh House (Brython Press, Liverpool, 1946)
- Colin Ward, Cotters and Squatters - Housing's Hidden History (Five Leaves Publications, Nottingham, 2002)
- Eurwyn Wiliam, Hand Made Homes: dwellings of the rural poor in Wales (National Museum of Wales, 1988)
- Eurwyn Wiliam, The Welsh Cottage (Royal Commission on the Ancient and Historical Monuments of Wales, 2010)
