= Pen-y-Gwryd =

Mountain pass in Wales

Coordinates: 53.08256°N 4.00203°W

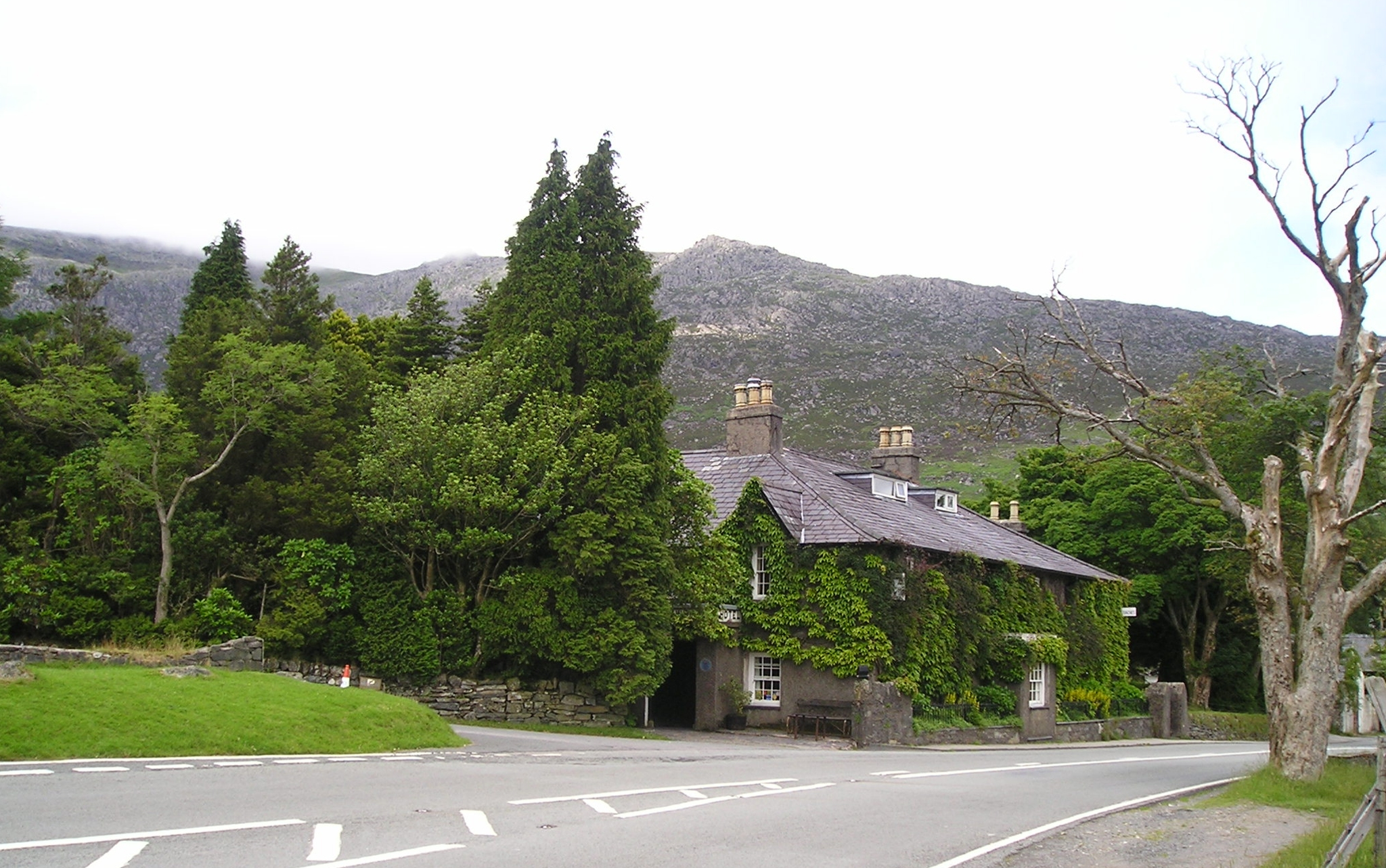
Pen-y-Gwryd Hotel in 2005

Pen-y-Gwryd is a pass at the head of Nantygwryd and Nant Cynnyd rivers close to the foot of Snowdon in Gwynedd, Wales. The area is located at the junction of the A4086 from Capel Curig to Llanberis and Caernarfon and the A498 from Beddgelert and Nant Gwynant about a mile from the head of the Llanberis Pass. It is close to the boundary with Conwy county borough in northern Snowdonia. The famous mountaineering hostelry, Pen-y-Gwryd Hotel, is located in the pass. It is also a mountain rescue post with links to the other rescue posts at Ogwen Cottage and Plas y Brenin.

The Old Miners' Track from the Snowdon copper mines are now part of the modern A4086 road between Pen-y-Gwryd and Pen-y-Pass. It continues northwards beyond Pen-y-Gwryd skirting Glyder Fach to Bwlch Tryfan and Dyffryn Ogwen. From Pen-y-Pass is the "PYG track", one of the many routes leading to the summit of Snowdon, its name is believed be derived from the initials ("P-y-G"). However, older maps show it as the "Pig track", a name derived from Bwlch y Moch (the Pigs' Gap).

== Roman camp ==
Surveying of the site prior to excavation of the Roman Camp in 1960

During Roman Britain, the Roman Army built a marching camp at the head of Dyffryn Mymbyr at the strategic intersection of three major routes through the Snowdonian mountains. This type of fortified cantonment was the kind built each evening by Roman legionaries when out in the field or on campaign. The camp, which has a rhomboid shape, covers about 4 ha (9.9 acres) providing accommodation for up to 2000 soldiers and their baggage trains. Its defences included a ditch approximately 5 ft (1.5 m) wide and 2 ft (0.61 m) deep below the turf-line and an earthwork rampart 8 ft (2.4 m) to 9 ft (2.7 m) wide. The northern rampart runs through the current location of the Pen-y-Gwryd Hotel.

The camp was probably first built during the Roman General Gnaeus Julius Agricola's conquest of the Ordovices in the late AD 70s. As it is unusual for temporary camps to survive, its existence suggests it was periodically reoccupied. Although the camp had no permanent garrison or buildings, it may have been a waypoint for Roman units travelling between Deva Victrix (Chester) and Segontium (Caernarfon). The site was first occupied prior to the construction of Caer Llugwy, a c. 90AD Roman auxiliary fort about 5.5 mi (8.9 km) to the east in the Afon Llugwy valley.

The site is difficult to observe due to erosion and local land usage as nothing remains except grass and bramble-covered mounds. It was first excavated in 1960 by A -level history students from a London school, staying at Plas-y Brenin, under the auspices of a Bangor University professor. Liaison with Plas-y-Brenin was by Jo Scarr (now Dr Josephine Flood). A section of the south rampart was excavated and a modern copy built in the interior to monitor features of decay following abandonment.

== Pen-y-Gwryd Hotel ==
The Pen-y-Gwryd Hotel was originally a farmhouse dating from 1811. It was converted to wayside inn by a John Roberts from Llanberis, who eventually sold the Inn in 1840 before emigrating to America. A Mrs Hughes, who was the widow of the first landlord (a Joseph Griffith) of the Capel Curig Inn (which became The Royal Hotel, now Plas-y-Brenin), and later the widow of Reverend Robert Hughes of Capel Curig, took over the Inn in 1843.

In 1847 Henry Owen acquired the Inn. He was born in Beddgelert, Caernarvonshire on 2 April 1822, the son of a farmer, Owen Owen. He married Ann Pritchard from the parish of Llanbeblig near Caernarvon. Initially Henry combined his hostelry work with a position of Agent at the nearby Snowdonian copper mine and later with farming. But by 1858, the inn business was sufficiently successful to allow him to purchase the freehold.

During the Owens' tenure running the inn, it became renowned for its status for comfort and hospitality. The original building was considerably extended transforming it from a farmhouse Inn to a well-known and popular hotel. Ann's excellent cookery was apparently to play no small part in the hotel's success. Eventually it became an integral part of the blossoming mountaineering industry that was developing in North Wales. In May 1898 The Climbers Club originated at Pen-y-Gwryd, as it is recorded in its first journal "....its natural birth at Pen-y-Gwryd" and "...its congenial atmosphere...... (The Climbers Club) first struck its roots". The Climbers Club is now based at Helyg on the A5 between Capel Curig and Ogwen Cottage.

In 1870 the Society of Welsh Rabbits (c.1865) was founded with the objective of exploring Snowdonia in winter (and as close to Christmas as possible). Ann Owen said in 1895 that the society had written an article "praising Pen-y-Gwryd as an excellent resort at Christmas". She noted " ....we rarely, if ever, had a guest at Christmas and since then we have hardly been without guests during the period". Henry continued to run the hotel until his death in 1891. Ann then took over the management until her death in 1896.

After the owner of The Royal Hotel, Capel Curig took over, the business saw an indifferent ten years. However, this changed when William Hampton, along with Arthur and Florence Lockwood, took ownership. The hotel and its mountaineering traditions soon picked up again and the building was redeveloped. In the 1920s they created Llyn Lockwood – the small trout lake opposite the hotel. During the Second World War the hotel was taken over by Lake House School from Bexhill-on-Sea.

The subsequent owners have improved the hotel and enhanced its mountaineering links by becoming a Mountain rescue post (the plaque is still attached to the main entrance), whilst maintaining the hotel's history. Guest bedrooms are named after each of Snowdonia's 13 peaks over 3,000 ft (910 m).

In 2016, the book, The Pen y Gwryd Hotel: Tales from the Smoke Room was published by Gomer Press. (With photography by Nicola Maysmor.) The work features a notable introduction by Jan Morris as well as contributions by: (amongst others) Chris Bonnnington, Peter Hillary, Rebecca Stephens, Jim, Perrin, Joe Brown, Anna Lawford, Ed Webster, Caradoc 'Crag' Jones, Doug Scott, John Disley, H.P.S Ahluwalia, Norbu Tenzing Norgay, Margaret Clennett, Hugh Brasher and Julian Freeman-Attwood as well as William 'Bill' Roache of Coronation Street fame.

=== Himalayan connections ===
The hotel's most notable mountaineering link is to the first successful Everest expedition in 1953 and the first successful Kangchenjunga expedition in 1955, when training and testing of oxygen equipment for those expeditions took place at Helyg, near Capel Curig. On the right, at the hotel entrance, there is a Tyrolean-style Stüberl (dining room) with the signatures, written on the ceiling, of the teams that did the first ascent of Everest in 1953 and of the first ascent of Kangchenjunga in 1955 – these include Sir Edmund Hillary, Tenzing Norgay, Sir John Hunt, Charles Evans, George Band, Joe Brown, John Angelo Jackson, Wilfred Noyce, Tony Streather, Tom Mackinnon, Norman Hardie, Neil Mather, John Clegg and others, including Noel Odell from Mallory's 1924 expedition and Chris Bonington of later successes. There are many photographs and exhibits provided by the original team members in the main bar and guest lounge. In the past each year, now every five years, Pen-y-Gwryd hosts the Everest and Kangchenjunga reunions.

Caradog Jones, the first Welshman to conquer Everest, has stated that it was this Welsh connection with the mountain which inspired him.

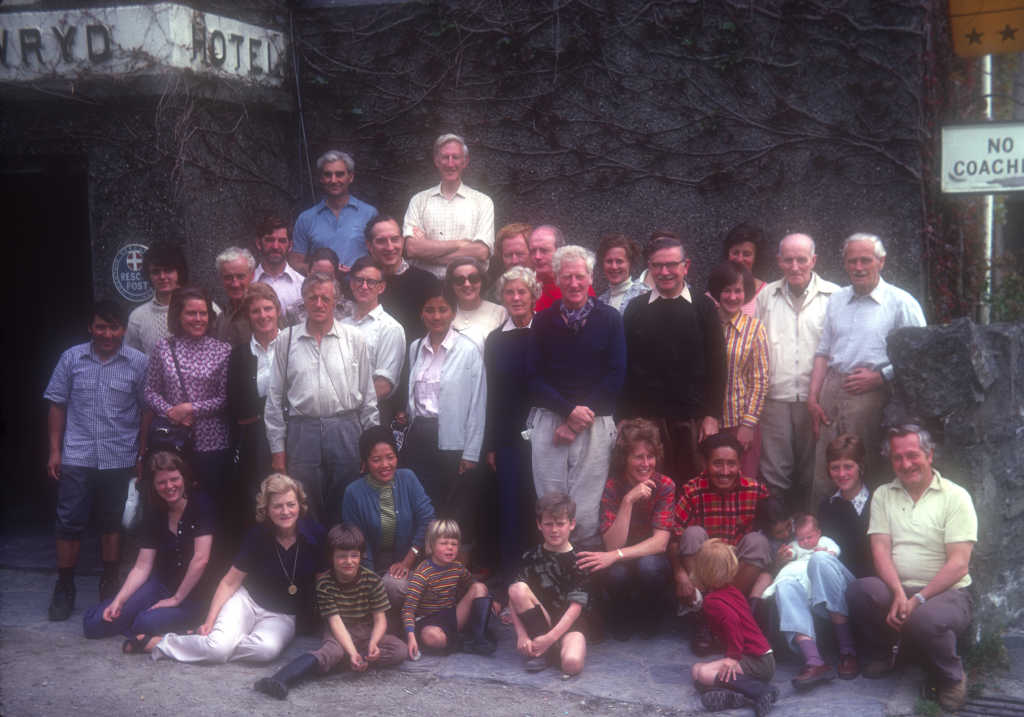
Everest reunion at Pen-y-Gwryd, 1963

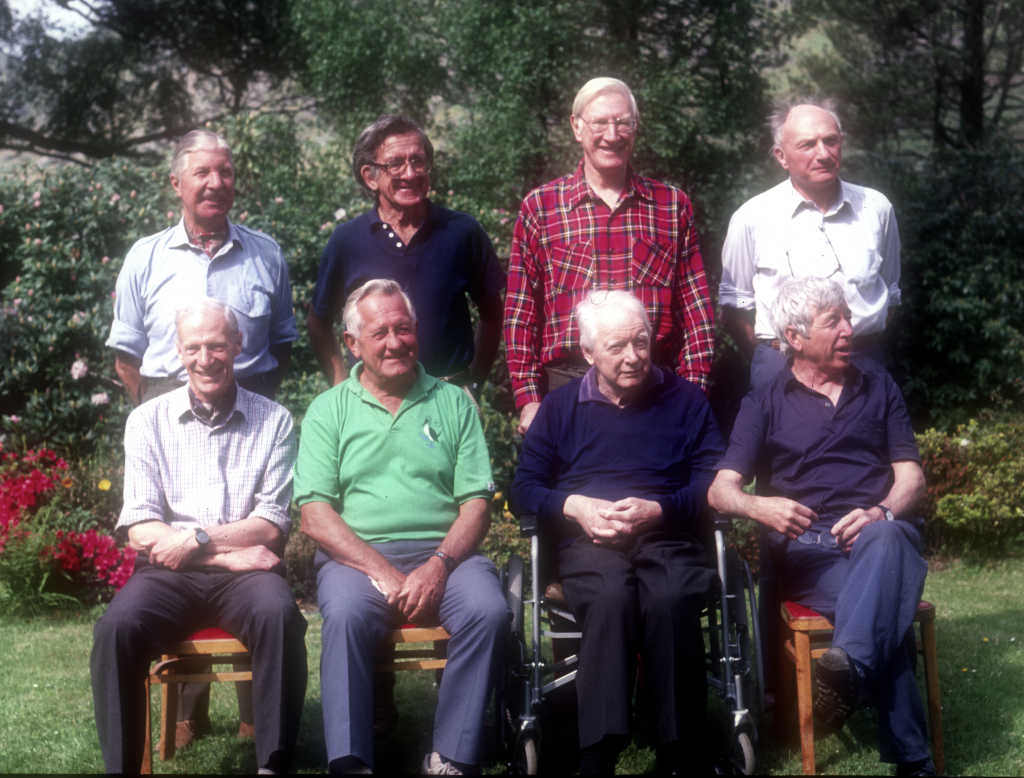
Kangchenjunga reunion at Pen-y-Gwryd, 1990

Other notable visitors include: Charles Kingsley and Henry Kingsley, William Ewart Gladstone (Gladstones), Augustine Birrell, Walter Parry Haskett Smith, Thomas Huxley, Lord Coleridge – past and present (at the time of writing), John Henry Cliffe who wrote Notes and Recollections of an Angler (1860), Andrew Ramsay, George Mallory in 1914, and actor Jack Hawkins during the filming of The Long Arm on location in Snowdonia.
