= Moel Siabod =

Mountain in Snowdonia, Wales

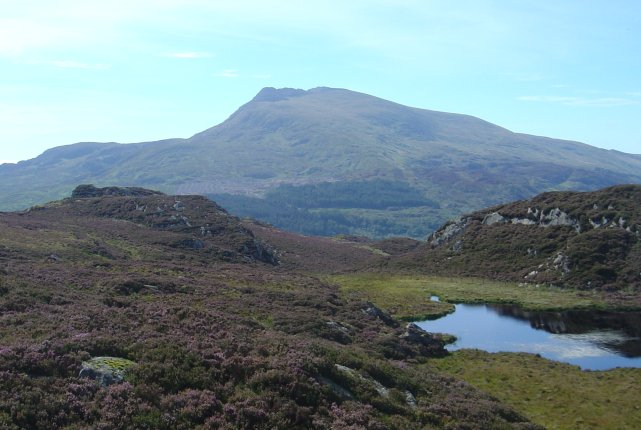
- Moel Siabod from the Crimpiau

Highest point
- Elevation: 872 m (2,861 ft)
- Prominence: 600 m (2,000 ft)
- Listing: Hewitt, Marilyn, Nuttall
- Coordinates: 53°04′23″N 3°55′57″W

Naming
- English translation: shapely hill
- Language of name: Welsh
- Pronunciation: Welsh: [ˈmɔil ˈʃabɔd]

Geography
- Location within Gwynedd Location within the United Kingdom
- Location: Snowdonia, Wales
- OS grid: SH705546
- Topo map: OS Landranger 115

Moel Siabod (Welsh for 'bare hill' with unknown meaning of 'Siabod') is a mountain in Snowdonia, Wales, which sits isolated above the village of Dolwyddelan. At 872 metres (2,861 ft), it is the highest peak in the Moelwynion mountain range. The UK National Mountain Centre, Plas-y-Brenin, is located at the foot of Moel Siabod. From the top of the mountain, it is reputedly possible to see 13 of the 15 highest peaks in Wales on a clear day without turning one's head.

== Etymology ==
The name Moel Siabod is wrongly translated as shapely hill, although William Williams in Observations on the Snowdon Mountains (1802) proposed that the name comes from siadod, meaning 'bare hill, whose head or crown is covered in new-fallen snow'. J. Lloyd-Jones of Dublin University, in his Enwau Lleoedd Sir Gaernarfon 1928 (Cardiff), favours Middle English origin 'shabbèd', 'shcabbèd', 'shabbid', 'sceabbed(e)' ('scabbed' Modern English), therefore proposes a shabby, scabby, scarred mountain.

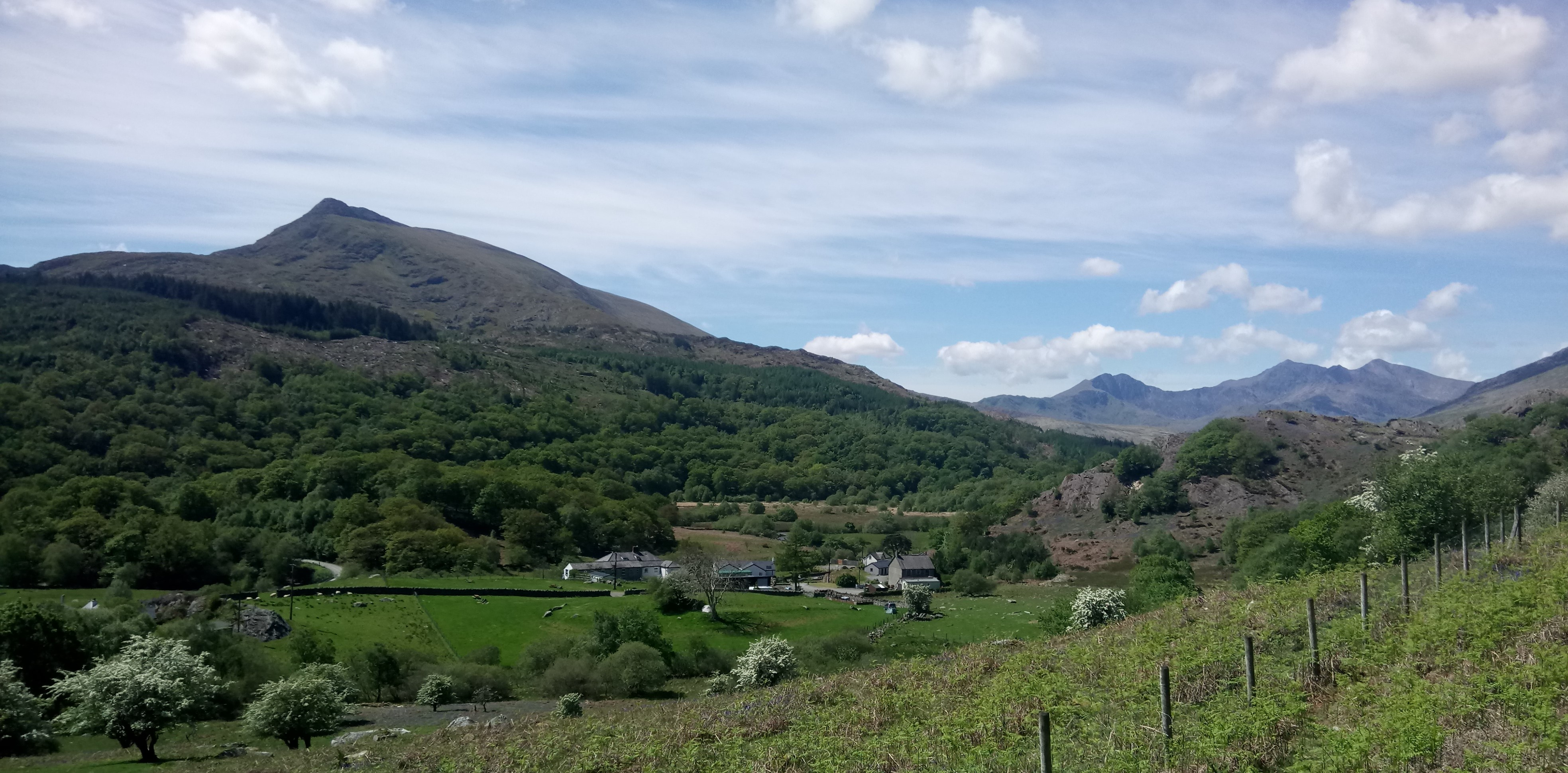
Moel Siabod (left) with Snowdon Horseshoe visible on right

== Access ==
The mountain is easily accessible from the north via Capel Curig and nearby Pont Cyfyng (by separate paths) and from the south via Dolwyddelan.

== Topography ==
The highest part of the mountain forms a relatively level, rocky ridge approximately 800 m long, running roughly south-west (from the summit) to north-east. At the north-eastern end of this main ridge there is a fairly steep descent towards Pont Cyfyng. At the south-west edge of the main ridge there is a further, much steeper ridge that branches off to the east, as well as several precipitous cliffs.

The north-west side of the main ridge is relatively gentle and supports a variety of flora and has numerous paths. The south-east side has many sharp drops down to a hanging valley. This valley, fenced in on two sides by the main ridge and the ridge running east from the summit, is at roughly 500 m above sea level and contains Llyn-y-foel (Welsh for lake of the mountain). There is both a steep descent, following a stream that emerges from the lake to the south-east, and a gentle descent, to the north-east, from this valley.

== Terrain ==
As mentioned above, the two main ridges are fairly rocky; an ascent up the minor ridge will usually require the use of hands, as will the ascent to Llyn-y-foel from the Dolwyddelan path. The terrain around the lake is prone to be boggy, especially on the northern side, and the path to the lake from Pont Cyfyng frequently turns into a flowing stream.

== Paths ==
There are several routes to the top of Moel Siabod, only one of which is marked on the local Ordnance Survey map. All of the paths below, excluding the route from Llyn-y-foel directly onto the minor ridge, are marked on the 'Snowdonia Snowdon and the Moelwynion' Harvey SuperWalker map.

From Dolwyddelan

A large part of the horizontal distance covered on this route is on Forestry Commission land to the north of Dolwyddelan and the south of the mountain. Along the dirt tracks through this land there is a fork signposted "Moel Siabod" (left) or "Capel Curig" (right). The latter path leads first of all to Pont Cyfyng, where it is possible to join the path above, or continue to Capel Curig and join the first route. The former path is a more direct route to the summit. This path continues on dirt tracks for a while before heading onto a footpath through the forest and thence onto access land. At this point, the path - which occasionally requires the use of hands to get up the rocky path - follows a stream which originates at Llyn-y-foel.

From Capel Curig

The most popular route starts from the Plas-y-Brenin National Mountaineering Centre in Capel Curig, and is therefore used for guided excursions. It is the gentlest of the three most common routes and is the only one marked on the OS maps.

Leaving the centre, the route crosses the Nant Gwryd via the ancient bridge "Pont-y-Bala"; it almost immediately enters Forestry Commission land and follows a variety of dirt tracks and footpaths before exiting onto open access land and continuing south up the grassy northern side of the mountain.

From Pont Cyfyng

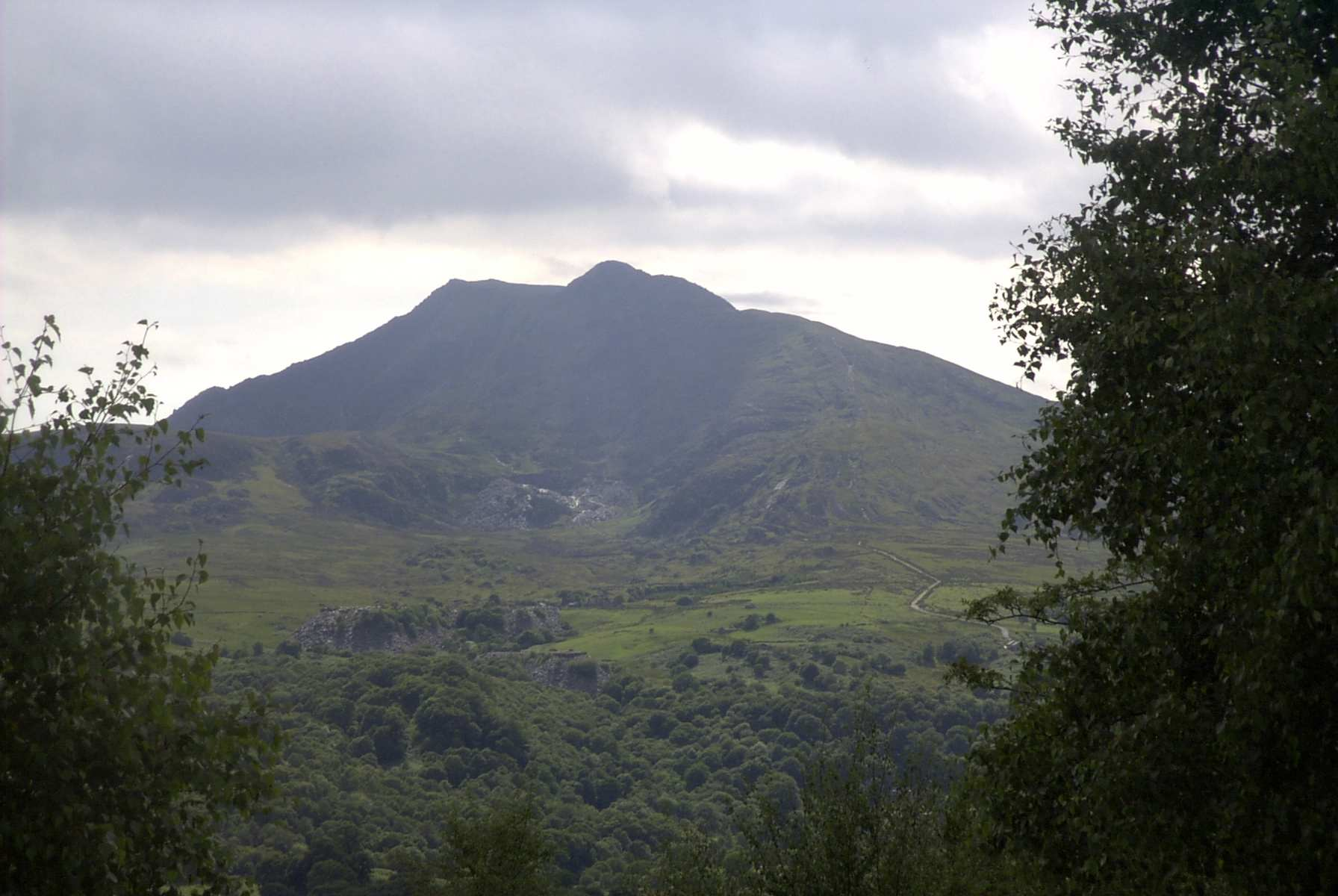
Moel Siabod from Ty Hyll showing old slate mining site.

A well marked turning onto a very steep tarmacked road in the village of Pont Cyfyng (not the first turning with the pedestrian sign) marks the beginning of this route, with a footpath leaving the road after about 100 m. This footpath forks, with one route taking a sharp ascent onto the main ridge and one a more gentle route up through an abandoned slate mine and up to Llyn-y-foel from where there are several paths to the summit (not marked on the OS map) via the minor ridge to the east.

Paths from Llyn-y-foel to the summit

There are numerous tracks around the lake which will allow a walker to get from any point at the lake to any other without too much trouble. The main route from the lake to the summit heads to the south of the lake and then turns sharply right and ascends the minor ridge to the summit. There is a further, more obscure path that ascends very steeply over rockfalls and some scree directly onto the ridge from the lake.

== Cultural references ==
- Duncton Wood
