= Caer Llugwy =

Roman fort in Conwy, Wales

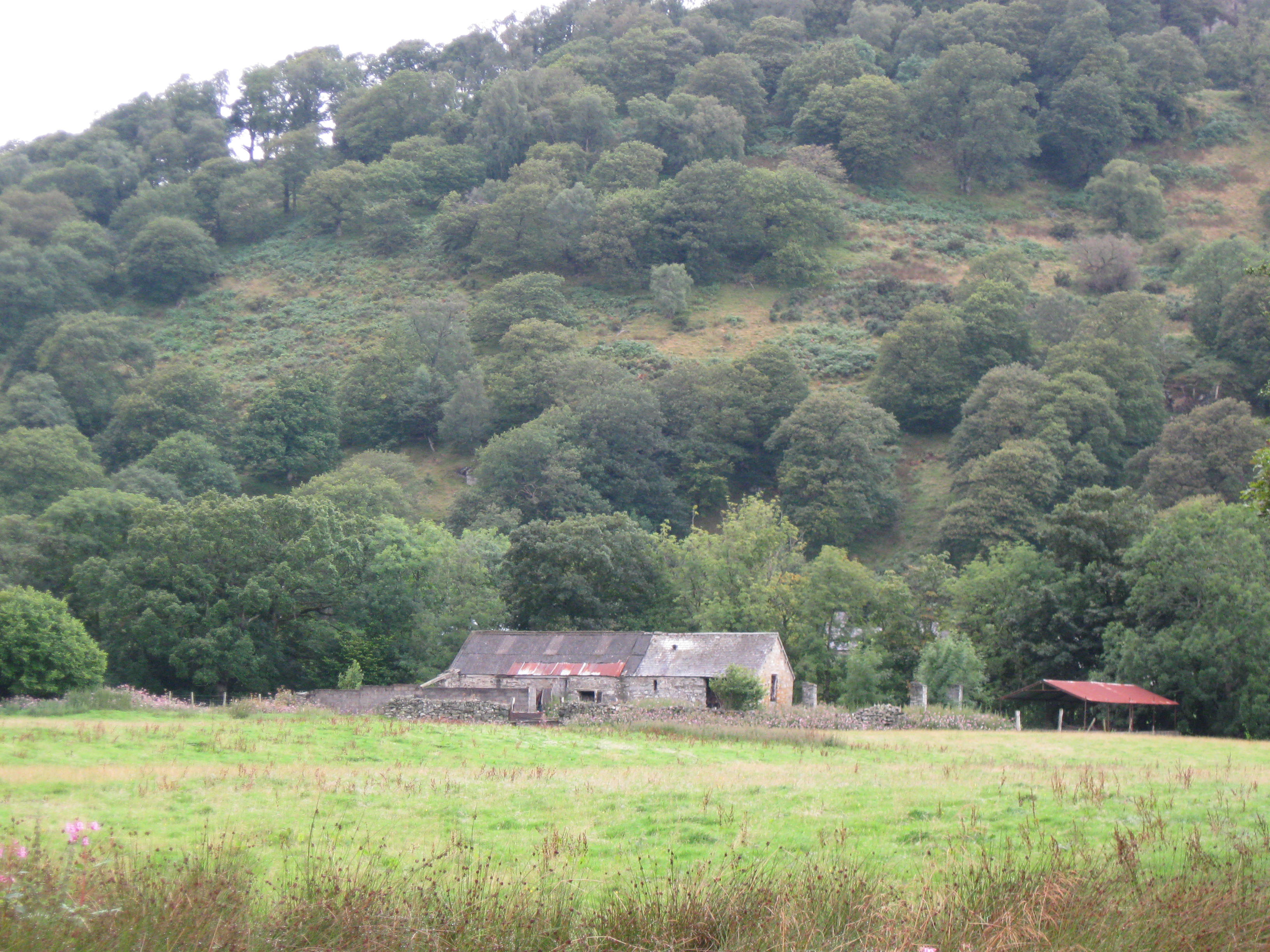
- Site of Caer Llugwy

- Location in Conwy
- 53.0976°N 3.8742°W
- Location: Conwy, Wales, UK
- OS grid reference: SH745572

Scheduled monument

Caer Llugwy, or Bryn-y-Gefeiliau, is the site of a Roman fort in a loop of the Afon Llugwy near Capel Curig in Conwy, Wales. It is notable in that there has been little development in the surrounding landscape: the valley in which it is situated being much as it was 2,000 years ago. It is a scheduled historic monument. The remains are on private land.

== Background ==
From the conquest of Wales onwards the Romans attempted to contain guerrilla resistance in the highland areas by surrounding the mountains with a network of forts and roads in the valleys. Founded around AD 90, Caer Llugwy housed an auxiliary cohort of around 500 men who policed the local population and controlled communications through the Llugwy and neighbouring valleys. There is a possibility that the outpost was also intended to control mining operations in the nearby hills, hence its Welsh name: Bryn-y-Gefeiliau; "Hill of the Smithies". It was drastically altered when a second fort was built in stone over its eastern defenses around AD 120; effectively leaving a western annex of about 0.8 hectares (2.0 acres).

This annex later contained a large courtyard building, thought to be a mansio, whose remains still exist up to a metre in height. It is thought that the site was abandoned as a military garrison around the middle of the second century, although there is some evidence that it was reoccupied intermittently after this date, probably as a posting station as the building of a mansio attests. Much of the surrounding buildings and field walls are constructed with stone from the site.
