= John Angelo Jackson =

English mountaineer, explorer and educationalist

John Angelo Jackson (24 March 1921 – 2 July 2005) was an English mountaineer, explorer and educationalist.

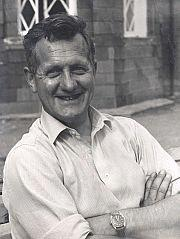
Photograph of John Angelo Jackson in the early 1960s in the grounds of Plas-y-Brenin, during his tenure as Director of the facility.

== Early life ==
He was brought up and educated in Nelson, Lancashire. He was apprenticed in pharmacy before World War II. However, at the outbreak of war, he left to volunteer for the R.A.F. in which he served for six years. He flew with No. 31 Squadron RAF in India and Burma, flying in much needed supplies to the 14th Army who were stranded behind Japanese lines, for which he was mentioned in despatches.

After the war he became a schoolmaster. He taught geography and science in Nelson and Redcar, during which time he would voluntarily undertake extracurricular activities after school hours and weekends introducing his students to the mountains.

Throughout his life, he practiced photography and applied his skills to various professional projects. His visual work and research were featured in his own books and international lectures, as well as in third-party publications, magazines, and BBC broadcasts.

== Mountaineering and educational career ==
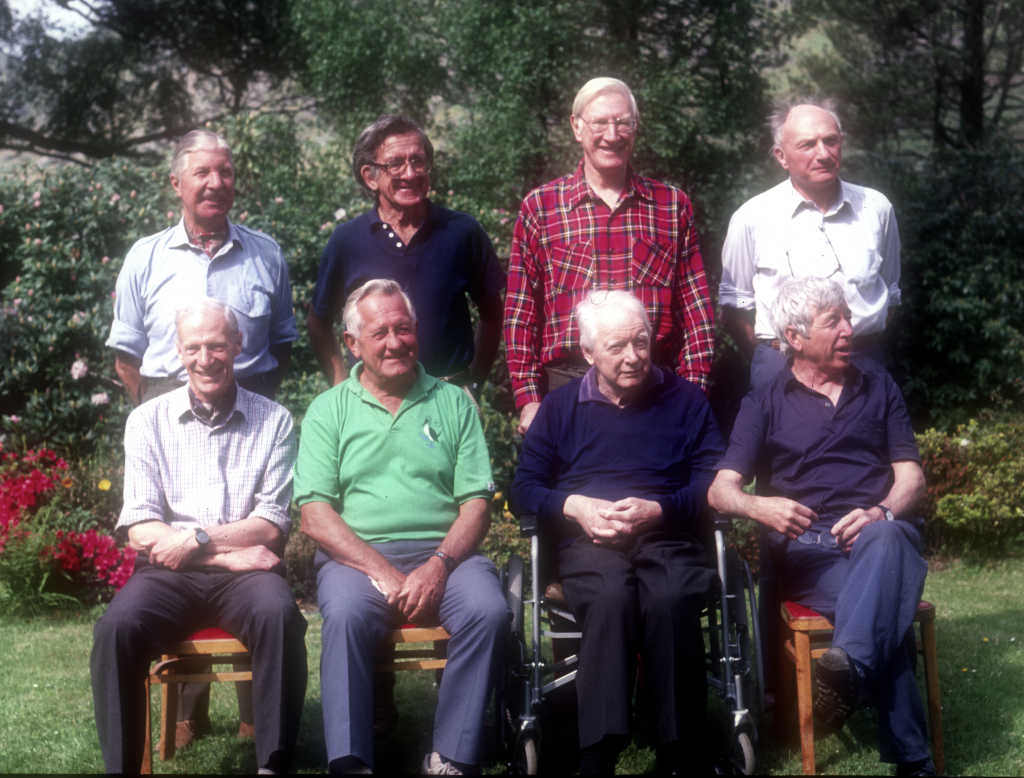
Kangchenjunga reunion at Pen-y-Gwryd June 1990

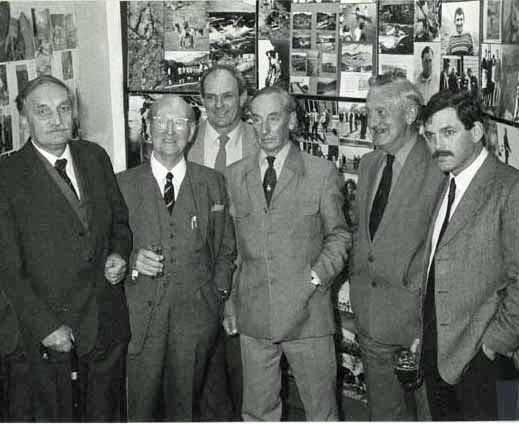
30th Anniversary of Plas y Brenin. G.I. Milton, Justin Evans, Sir Jack Longland, Dave Alcock, John A Jackson and John Barry

He started climbing on the Yorkshire Moors, and later moved to the Lake District and Scotland. His experience as a first-class rock climber was crucial to becoming Instructor and later Chief Instructor at the RAF Mountaineering Centre at Sonamarg in Kashmir.

- 1944 Chief Instructor at the R.A.F. Mountain Training Centre, Kashmir Himalaya
- 1952 Member of the British N.W. Garhwal Expedition – Central Himalaya with John Kempe. They went on to attempt an ascent of the unclimbed 6,500 metres (21,300 ft) Nilkanta, on the route they bivouacked at 16,000’ and 17,000’, but ultimately they were defeated by heavy snow.
- 1953 First reserve on the first ascent of Chomolungma (Mount Everest) (pre-monsoon), and was involved with all initial training including climbing in North Wales with oxygen tanks. Jackson was a full member of the post monsoon expedition, however as the first expedition summited the post monsoon expedition was cancelled. Further related information can be found in the Pen-y-Gwryd article.
- 1954 Was the mountaineering leader of the Daily Mail Abominable Snowman Expedition (Yeti), where the first trek from Everest to Kangchenjunga was completed.
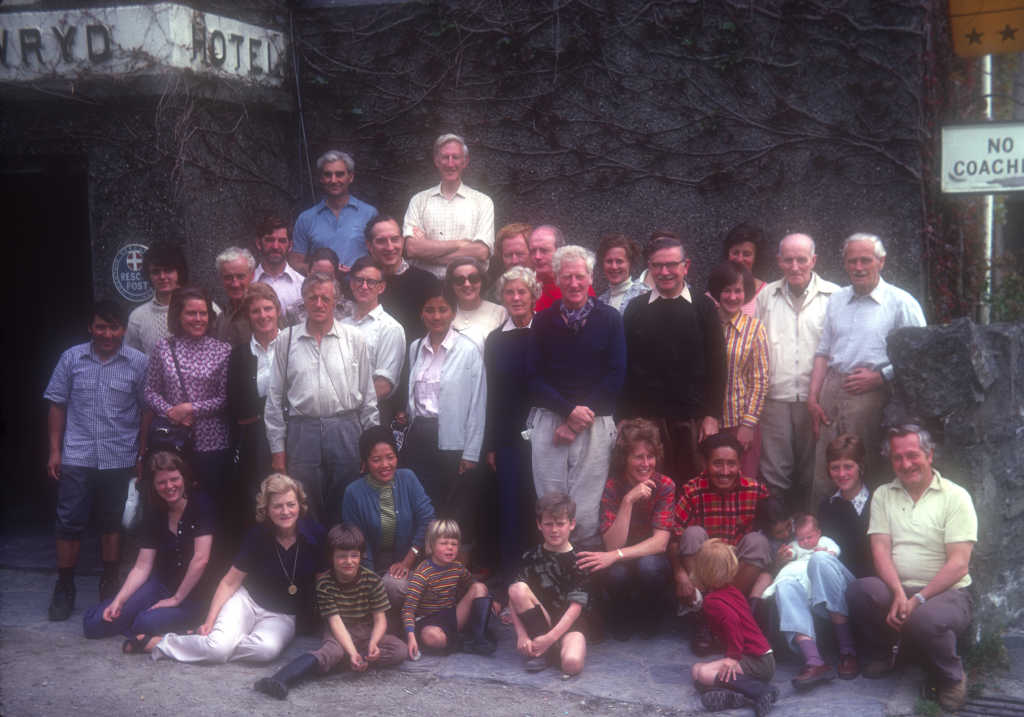
  Everest Reunion 1963 Pen-y-Gwryd
- 1955 Published his first book, More than Mountains.
- 1955 Member of the successful 1955 British Kangchenjunga expedition which made the first ascent of the 8,586 metres (28,169 ft) mountain, the third-highest in the world. He reached and set up camp five (out of six) with Tom Mackinon. The entire group would have summited except for the encroaching monsoon which prevented this.
- 1957 October 28. Two years as Chief Instructor at Plas y Brenin working for The Central Council of Physical Recreation (CCPR), succeeding John Disley who had resigned after only a short period in the post.
- Early 1960 was a Senior member of Sir John Hunt's expedition to North East Greenland, Stauning Alps. A mixed group of mountaineers and scientists which also included 18 Duke of Edinburgh Gold Award winners - who were a credit to the expedition. Jackson was a big proponent of the Duke of Edinburgh Award Scheme.
- 1960 He became the second Director/Warden of Plas y Brenin for a further sixteen years until 1976.
- During his tenure at Plas y Brenin, to highlight just a few achievements:
  - First dry ski slope in North Wales built mainly by staff but in the main by Richard McHardy, it was a great success and would attract people from all over Wales and England.
  - The first cross-country dry ski track in Wales and possibly the UK, later tested and used by the British Biathlon Team.
  - Two snow-making projects, the first being at Rhyddolion above Betws-y-Coed North Wales using an underpowered compressor, the second being at Bryn Engan, Plas y Brenin with a more powerful compressor.
  - Instigator of the Mountain Leader Training Board along with Sir Jack Longland, the MLT Certificate and the Mountain Instructor Certificate.
  - Built the first all-weather training pool for teaching canoeing and life-saving skills and still very much in action to this day.
  - He understood the value of marketing and would devote a good part of his time single-handedly lecturing to colleges, universities, Local Education Authorities, schools, Mountaineering – Climbing – Walking and ski clubs (anyone who wanted to use the outdoors) to encourage people to use the Centre; his approach proved an enormous success and was pivotal in establishing Plas y Brenin as a world leader in outdoor education.
  - Took the first early ski and ski mountaineering groups to the Italian Dolomites; these were the "Dolomiti Superski" courses at Plas Menai and now are now mainstay activities at both outdoor centres.
  - It was always a high point when staff took up prominent positions or created their own projects that became successful. For example, Don Roscoe and Barbara Spark went on to run the Outdoor Education Department at UCNW Bangor, Dave Alcock went on from being a Mountaineering Instructor to be the Director of Plas y Brenin for eleven years, Roger Orgill was twice Chief Instructor (after resigning at least once) was an avid committee man and was awarded an MBE.
- 1963 Member of Trans-Pindus Expedition, Greece – Leader John Hunt
- 1970s Published Safety on Mountains for the CCPR in the very early 1970s, which reached its 8th reprint by 1972 (18p).
- 1976 "The Himachal Expedition": with his wife Eileen, he made a nine-month overland journey from Anglesey, Wales to Nepal and back, some 18,000 miles, in a specially strengthened camper van. En route, they gathered a wealth of photographic narrative, used in educational lecture tours in later life and indeed still used today as reference material by many periodicals.
- 1978 Became the first Director of the then named Plas y Deri, later to become Plas Menai Water Sports Centre near Caernarfon for the "Sports Council of Wales". Again he vigorously took to the lecture circuit indirectly marketing the centre. During this time he developed many new idea above and beyond his purview.
- 1981 Leader of the Gorphwysfa Expedition to S.E. Garhwal – Nanda Devi/Trisul area, made ascent of Bethartoli Himal South c. 21,000 ft.
- 1987 Leader of Canadian, Laurentian University, Sudbury, Ontario, Outdoor Adventure Leadership Programme, Physical Education Study Tour "Kashmir Himalaya Expedition 1987". Climbed Kolahoi and researched Mini-Ice-Age in the area as well as study of alpine flora and climate of the region by Professors Courtin and Beckett, Biology Department Laurentian University.
- 1990 Ascent of Mount Kilimanjaro, East Africa (5895 m) and ascent of Point Lenana (4985 m) on Mount Kenya
- 2000 at the age of eighty led the Markha Valley Trek/ascent of Stok Kangri 20,100 ft, Ladakh.

Within the public engagement framework rules laid down by the CCPR that effectively prevented him from actually sitting on committees of external bodies, he extensively guided major governing bodies, i.e. the British Mountaineering Council and the Mountain Leadership Training Board, to become involved with all aspects of "Outdoor Pursuits", not solely the climbing aspects.

With the assistance of a grant made by the then Sports Minister Dennis Howell, he was able to build the canoe training pool, extend the dry ski slope and provide a Bar which added greatly to the existing facilities of the Centre.

He was elected an Honorary Member of The Himalayan Club and the Fell and Rock Climbing Club and he wrote extensively for many magazines and journals, including Climber and Rambler, The Great Outdoors, The Himalayan Journal, The Fell and Rock Journal and the Alpine Journal.

== Later life ==
He ran (with the aid of his wife, Eileen Jackson) countless treks to the Himalaya, Zanskar, Kashmir, Nepal, India, Peru, Ecuador & Galapagos Islands, Kilimanjaro.

It is important to relate that he did not do this for money – he received no payment for these services as he considered it his "hobby" – he did this work for the love of travel, for the people who wanted to experience the mountains he held in such high regard.

In June 2005, he was interviewed for the last time, by Jamie Owen for BBC Wales during the making of a series of documentaries for Welsh television "Welsh Journeys". In this interview, he again re-affirmed his love for mountains, Wales, lives experiences and also the view that mountains were for everybody.

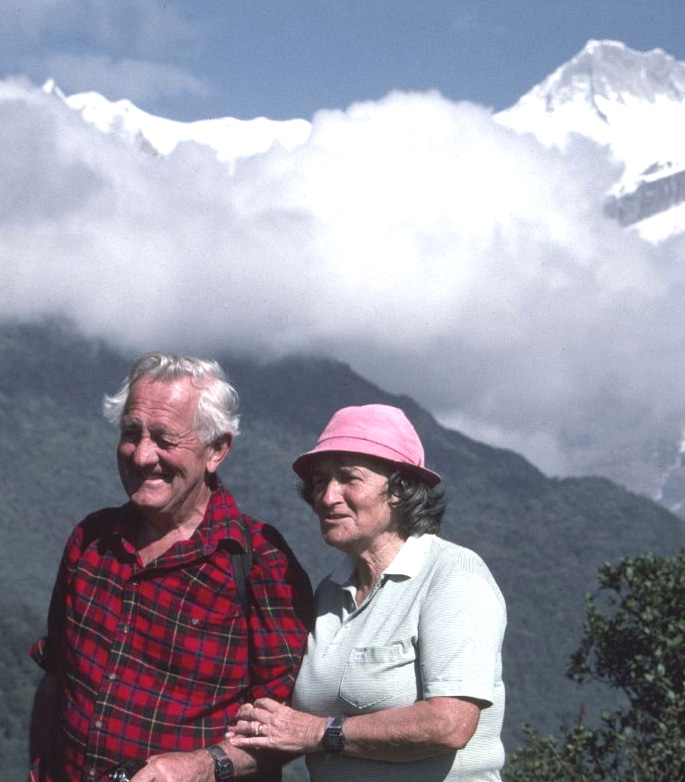
John A Jackson with wife Eileen, Annapurna II 1996

== Publications ==
- John A. Jackson Climbers Guide to Sonamarg Kashmir published by the Himalayan Club in 1944/45 and revised by JAJ in 1976
- John A. Jackson, More than Mountains (first published in 1955 by George G. Harrap & Co. Ltd)
- John Jackson, Safety on Mountains (8th Edition published by (CCPR) The Central Council of Physical Recreation, in 1972, Illustrated by Gordon F. Mansell)
- John Jackson, Safety on Mountains (revised for the (BMC) British Mountaineering Council 1974/1975 Reprinted 1976, Illustrated by Reg Cartwright, ISBN 0-903908-20-4)
- John Jackson, John Barry, Tim Jepson, Safety on Mountains: An Approach to Mountain Adventure for Beginners (BMC, 1988/1989, ISBN 0-903908-95-6)
- John Angelo Jackson, Adventure Travels in the Himalaya (First published in 2005 by Indus Publishing, New Delhi, ISBN 81-7387-175-2, www.indusbooks.com), Foreword by Harish Kapadia

== Other reference material ==
Jamie Owen, Welsh Journeys (Published in 2005, by Gomer Press, www.gomer.co.uk, ISBN 1-84323-569-2, Snowdonia – pages 79–101)

=== External website ===
- John Angelo Jackson website

=== Books still in print ===
- Adventure Travels in the Himalaya

== Obituaries ==
- The Guardian
- ''The Times''
- The Daily Telegraph
- The Independent
- Daily Post
- The Gorphwysfa Club, Wales
- The Hindu – "Kangchenjunga Reunion 2005"
- The Hindu – Related Publications
- The Himalayan Journal
