= Capel Curig =

Village in Conwy County Borough, Wales

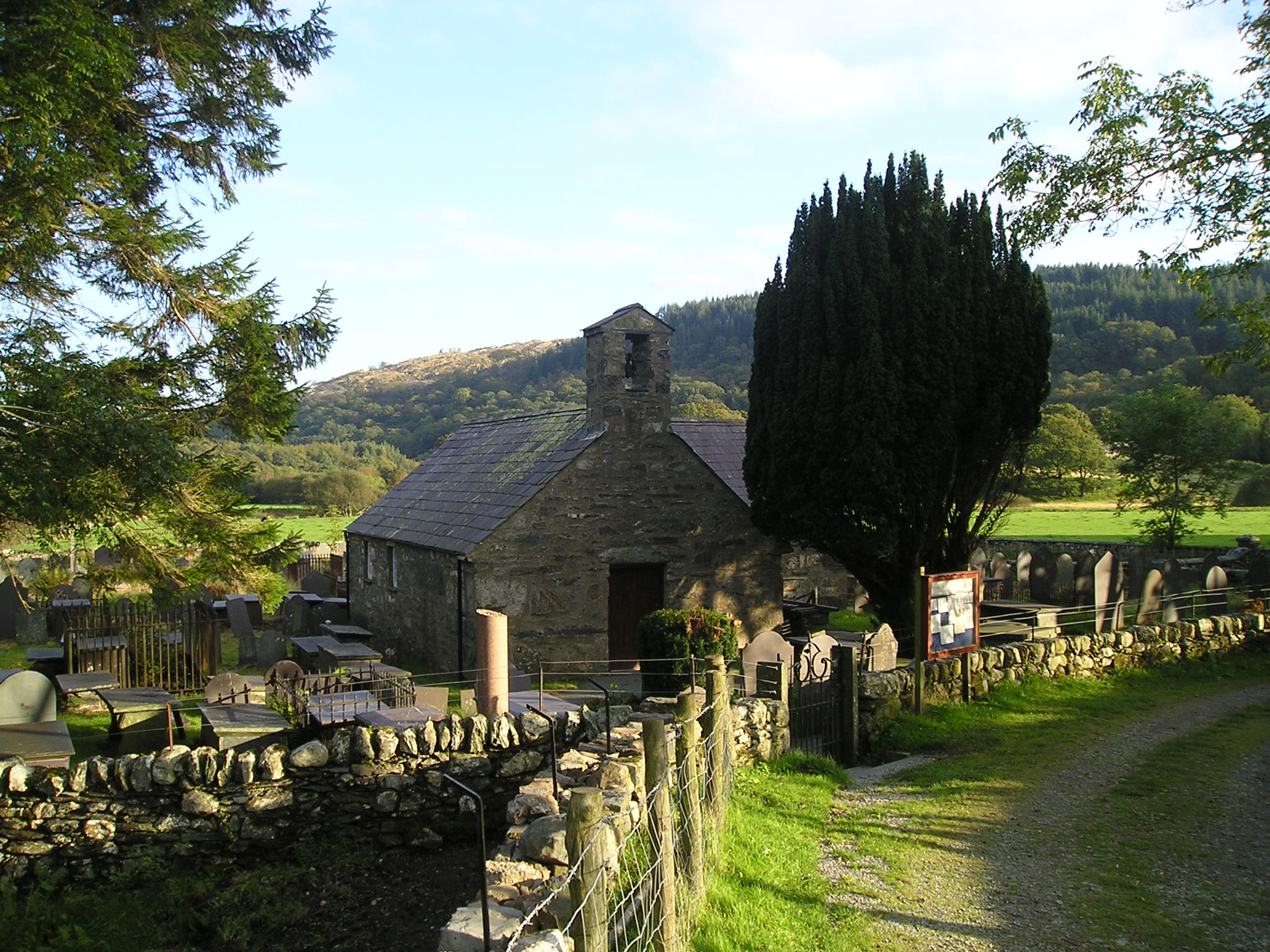
- St Julitta's Church

- Location within Conwy
- Population: 206 (2018)
- OS grid reference: SH720582
- Community: Capel Curig
- Principal area: Conwy
- Preserved county: Clwyd
- Country: Wales
- Sovereign state: United Kingdom
- Post town: BETWS-Y-COED
- Postcode district: LL24
- Dialling code: 01690
- Police: North Wales
- Fire: North Wales
- Ambulance: Welsh
- UK Parliament: Bangor Aberconwy
- Senedd Cymru – Welsh Parliament: Aberconwy
- List of places UK Wales Conwy 53.105°N 3.913°W Map of the community

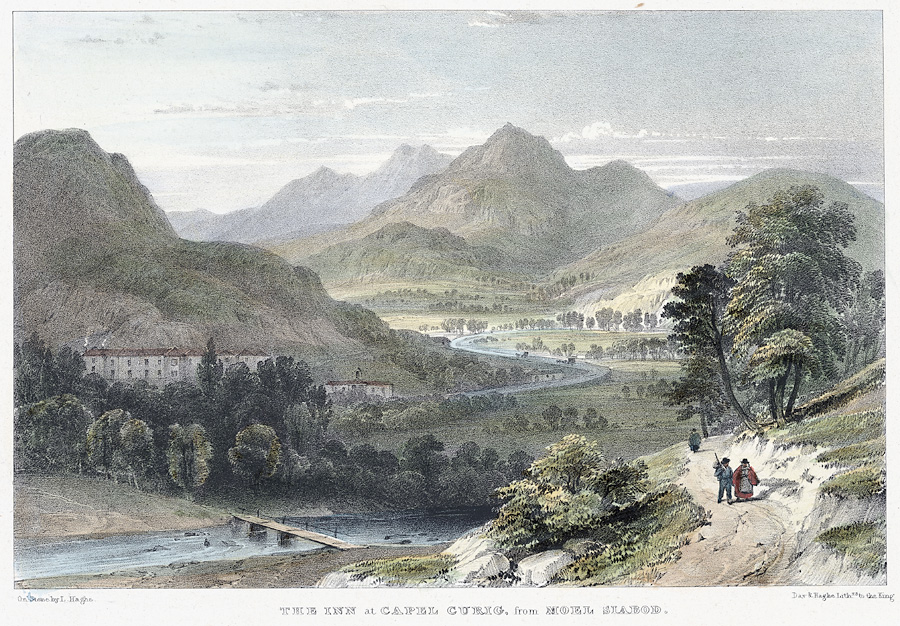
Capel Curig, c.1870

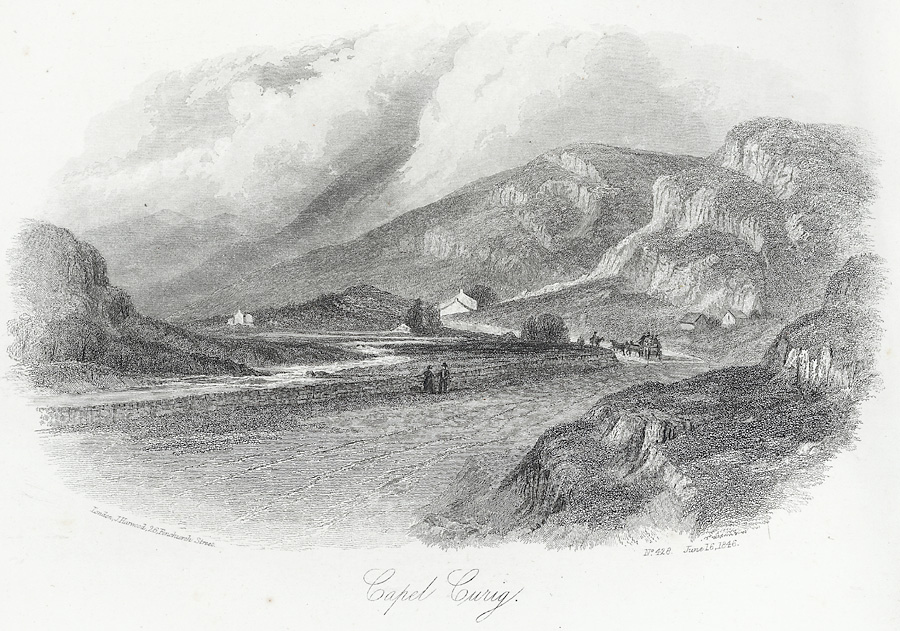
Unspoilt Capel Curig 1846 by John Harwood

Capel Curig (Welsh pronunciation: [ˈkɑːpɛl ˈkɨːrɪɡ]; meaning "Curig's Chapel") is a village and community in Conwy County Borough, Wales. Historically in Caernarfonshire, it lies in the heart of Snowdonia, on the River Llugwy, and has a population of 226, reducing slightly to 206 at the 2011 census. It lies at the junction of the A5 road from Bangor and Bethesda to Betws-y-Coed with the A4086 road from Caernarfon, Llanberis, Pen-y-Pass and Pen-y-Gwryd. It is surrounded by hills and mountains, including Moel Siabod and Pen Llithrig y Wrach.

== Name ==
Capel Curig takes its name from the little St Julitta's Church in the ancient graveyard by the river bridge on the Llanberis road. This, confusingly, has been known for over 100 years as St Julitta's Church, and is currently being restored by the "Friends of Saint Julitta". Tradition claims this chapel to be the 6th-century foundation of St Curig, a Celtic bishop. Centuries later, probably when the present ancient church was built, the name appears to have been Latinised as Cyricus, which is the name of a 4th-century child martyr whose mother was Julitta. They are usually named together as Saints Quiricus and Julietta.

The names Capel Kiryg and Capel Kerig were recorded in 1536 and 1578 respectively.

== Roman fort ==
Approximately one kilometre from Pont Cyfyng, on the farm of Bryn Gefeiliau, there are the remains of a Roman fort (c.90–100 AD) and named Caer Llugwy by its excavators. (53.0972°N 3.8743°W, OS Grid Reference SH746572). In 1920 excavations undertaken by J.P. Hall and Captain G.H. Hodgson revealed a roughly square Roman fort of approximately 4 acres (1.6 ha). Stone buildings were uncovered and traced. The rectangular walled area is on flat land close to the River Llugwy. From the pottery and finds in 1923 and subsequently, it appears to have only been garrisoned for 20–30 years.

== Activity centre ==
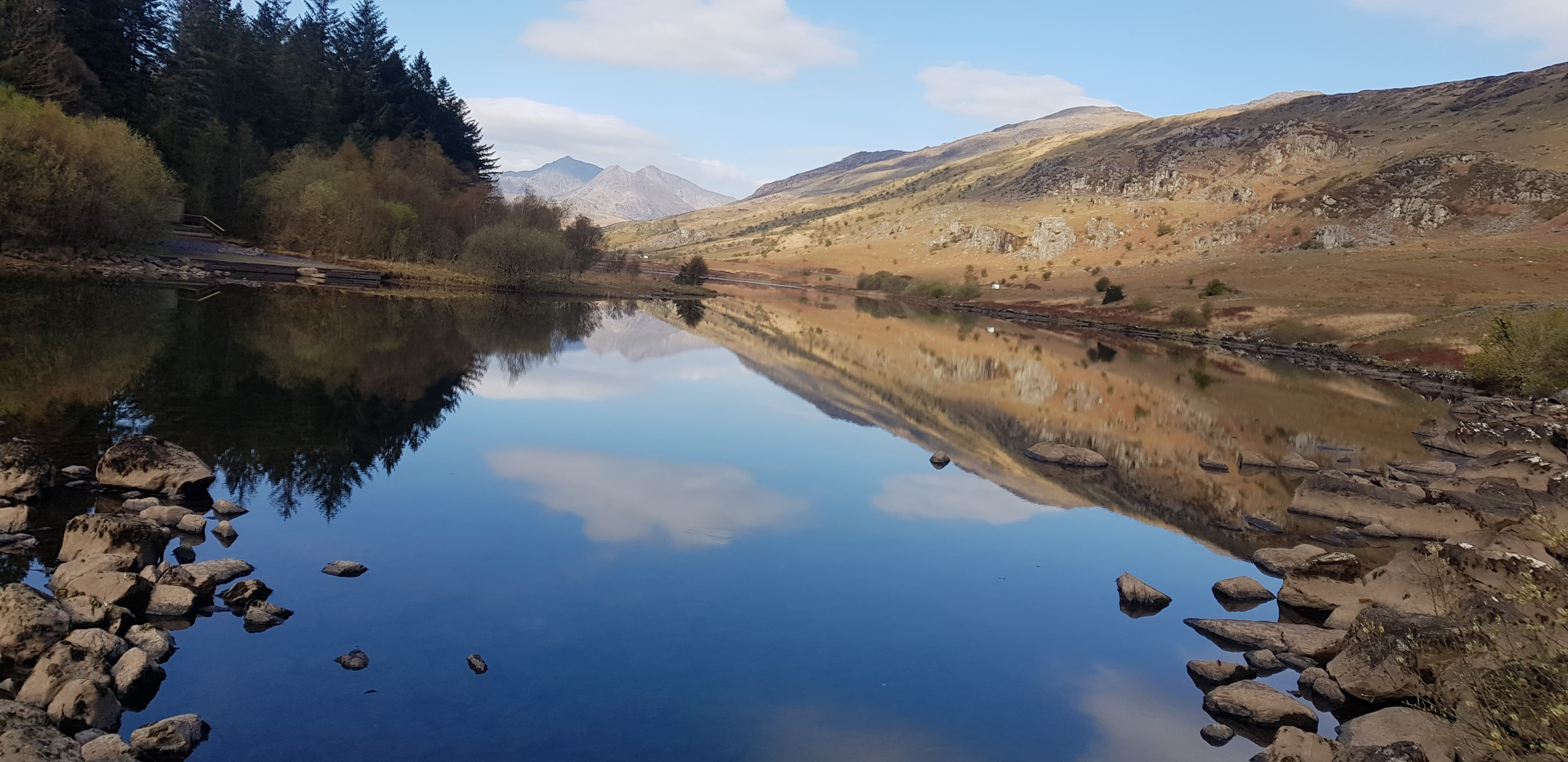
Surrounding area

The village is a popular centre for walking, climbing, mountaineering, mountain biking and other outdoor pursuits and is served by the Sherpa bus network. It is also home to an Army training camp, a camp site, several cafes and hotels and outdoor activity gear shops, and, formerly, a youth hostel.

Wolverhampton City Council have since 1961 operated 'The Towers' outdoors activity centre just outside Capel Curig. The centre facilitates walking, climbing, a variety of watersports and field studies on a schedule that is adapted day to day according to the prevailing weather conditions and to the abilities and needs of individuals and groups.

Also located in Capel Curig is the UK National Mountain Centre at Plas y Brenin, which offers the highest quality mountaineering, climbing, canoeing facilities and training. One mile east of the village on the A5 is Tŷ Hyll, home of the Snowdonia Society between 1988 and 2010.

== Culture ==
Capel Curig is mentioned in the song Bottleneck at Capel Curig by cult UK band Half Man Half Biscuit on their album Trouble Over Bridgwater.

Capel Curig is the setting for the climax of the 1956 thriller The Hidden Face by Victor Canning.

== Welsh language ==
According to the 2011 Census, 57.1% of the community's population aged 3 years or over could speak Welsh, with 82.5% of the Welsh-born population aged 3+ being able to speak Welsh. 54.3% of the community's population could speak Welsh in 2001.

49.5% of the community's population aged 3 years or over could speak, read and write Welsh in 2011.

== Climate ==
As with much of the rest of the British Isles, Capel Curig experiences a temperate maritime climate (Cfb), with warm summers and cold winters, little extremes of temperature and high humidity year round. The driest month is May, with 142 mm (5.6 in) of rain, while the wettest is December, with 346 mm (13.6 in) of rain. The warmest recorded temperature was 32.1 °C (89.8 °F) on 19 July 2022 and the coldest −17.5 °C (0.5 °F) on 20 December 2010. Capel Curig is one of the wettest places in the UK and the wettest in Wales. Record high temperatures during February 2019 were higher than in the average summer: on 25 February 2019, Capel Curig recorded its warmest February day on record, with a temperature of 17.5 °C (63.5 °F). This was beaten again the next day, with 18.8 °C (65.8 °F).

Climate data for Capel Curig (1991-2020 normals, extremes 1994−present)
Month	Jan	Feb	Mar	Apr	May	Jun	Jul	Aug	Sep	Oct	Nov	Dec	Year
Record high °C (°F)	15.4 (59.7)	19.3 (66.7)	20.4 (68.7)	24.2 (75.6)	29.2 (84.6)	31.2 (88.2)	32.1 (89.8)	31.4 (88.5)	28.2 (82.8)	23.8 (74.8)	18.9 (66.0)	15.2 (59.4)	32.1 (89.8)
Mean daily maximum °C (°F)	7.0 (44.6)	7.1 (44.8)	8.8 (47.8)	11.4 (52.5)	14.4 (57.9)	16.6 (61.9)	18.2 (64.8)	17.8 (64.0)	16.0 (60.8)	12.8 (55.0)	9.8 (49.6)	7.6 (45.7)	12.3 (54.1)
Daily mean °C (°F)	4.5 (40.1)	4.4 (39.9)	5.8 (42.4)	7.8 (46.0)	10.5 (50.9)	13.0 (55.4)	14.8 (58.6)	14.5 (58.1)	12.7 (54.9)	9.9 (49.8)	7.1 (44.8)	5.0 (41.0)	9.2 (48.6)
Mean daily minimum °C (°F)	1.9 (35.4)	1.7 (35.1)	2.7 (36.9)	4.2 (39.6)	6.7 (44.1)	9.4 (48.9)	11.3 (52.3)	11.3 (52.3)	9.4 (48.9)	7.1 (44.8)	4.5 (40.1)	2.4 (36.3)	6.1 (43.0)
Record low °C (°F)	−11.4 (11.5)	−8.5 (16.7)	−12.4 (9.7)	−5.1 (22.8)	−3.5 (25.7)	−0.1 (31.8)	2.8 (37.0)	1.6 (34.9)	−1.2 (29.8)	−5.4 (22.3)	−11.6 (11.1)	−17.5 (0.5)	−17.5 (0.5)
Average precipitation mm (inches)	309.6 (12.19)	258.2 (10.17)	213.4 (8.40)	155.8 (6.13)	142.0 (5.59)	144.1 (5.67)	157.6 (6.20)	189.7 (7.47)	206.3 (8.12)	274.0 (10.79)	300.4 (11.83)	346.0 (13.62)	2,697.1 (106.19)
Average precipitation days (≥ 1.0 mm)	19.5	17.6	16.8	15.5	14.3	14.0	15.6	16.9	16.0	19.0	20.9	20.4	206.5
Source 1: Met Office
Source 2: Starlings Roost Weather

== Evan Roberts ==
Capel Curig was home to the botanist Evan Roberts (1909–1991). Roberts lived at Gelli, from where he explored all of Snowdonia, and compiled an unparalleled knowledge of the plant life of North Wales. Although he spent the first 40 years of his life as a quarry worker, he went on to become the colleague of academics. He was awarded the honorary degree of M.Sc. of the University of Wales, in 1956, at the same ceremony as the architect Frank Lloyd Wright, and his portrait was painted by Kyffin Williams.

== See also ==
- Cobden's Hotel
- Snowdon from Capel Curig, an 1787 landscape painting by Philip James de Loutherbourg
