= Tŷ Hyll =

Historic house in Capel Curig, Wales

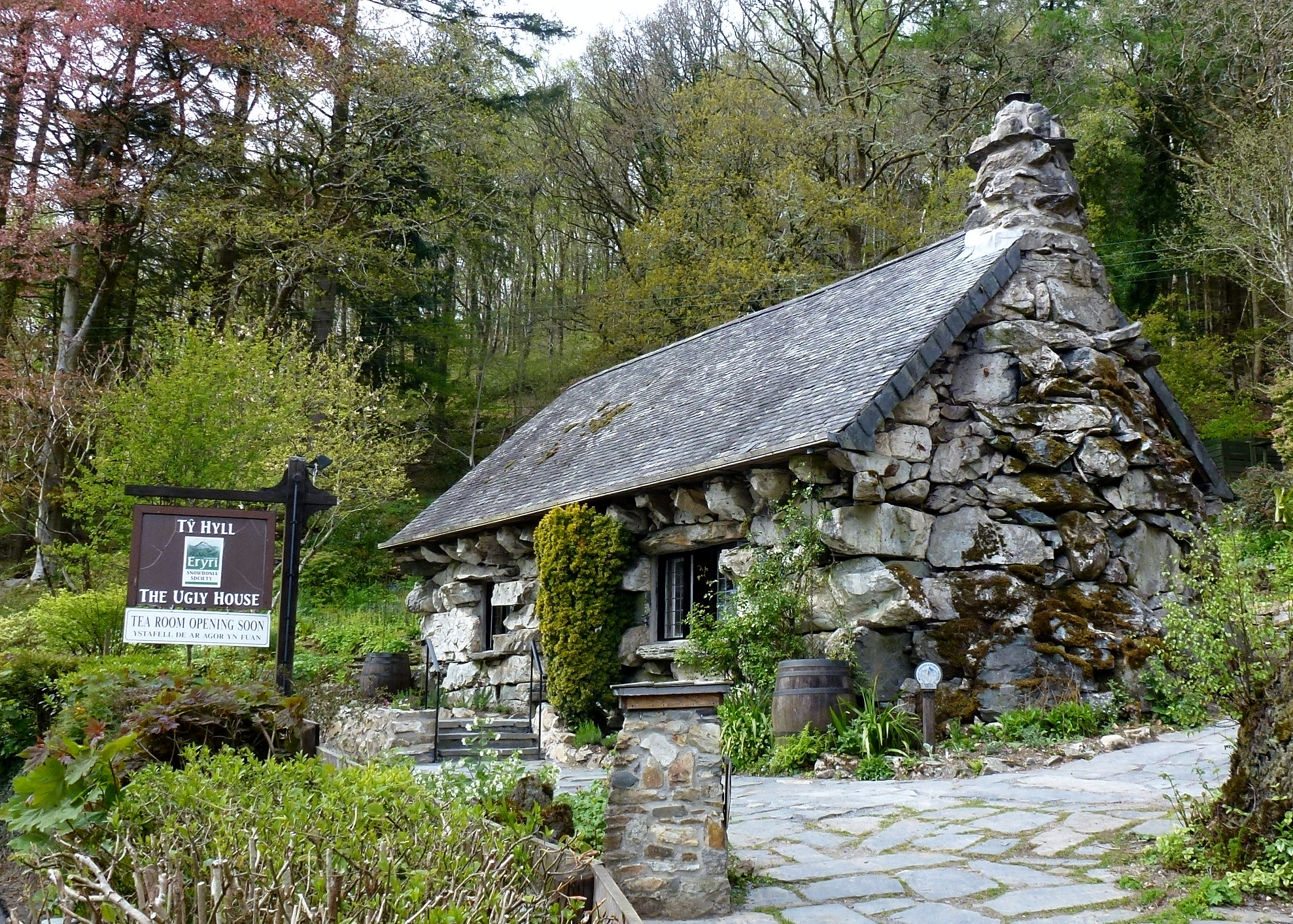
Tŷ Hyll in 2012

Tŷ Hyll (Welsh for 'Ugly House') is a crudely built stone house on the A5 road between Betws-y-Coed and Capel Curig in north Wales. It has been used as a cafe since 2012. It became a Grade II listed building in 1966.

== Description ==
The house is single storey and built using large undressed boulders, some weighing up to 3 tonnes. It has a semi-circular tapering chimney stack to the right and a tall boulder chimney to the rear. It has a central main entrance door to the front and a smaller two-panel door to the rear. There are windows to the front and rear, and the left hand gable. It also has dormer windows to the rear attic floor.

== History ==
There are claims (for example by the Snowdonia Society) that the house dates from the 15th-century and was possibly a 'Tŷ unnos', which was a house built on common land in one night - allowing the builder to claim ownership. The date 1475 is carved above the fireplace. However, authoritative sources, such as Cadw, date it more probably to the 19th-century. According to the Snowdonia Society the house does not appear in travel writing until 1853. Meanwhile the naturalist Charles Darwin, who stayed in Capel Curig in 1842, describes a "noble and commodious edifice, without the use of cut stone" with "wedge-formed stones for his arches, elongated stones for his lintels, and flat stones for his roof", possibly referring to Tŷ Hyll.

Origins of the name Tŷ Hyll are uncertain, possibly derived from the nearby River Llugwy though possibly referring to the crude boulders of its construction (hyll also means 'rough' or 'crude' in Welsh).

The house was first used as a public tearoom after World War I. The last known resident of the 20th century was Edward Riley, from 1928 until his death in the 1960s. It passed to his family, was used as a cafe, gift shop and antique shop before falling into disrepair. It was eventually purchased by the Snowdonia Society in 1988 and restored using volunteers led by the Society's founder, Peter Kirby. The house was used as the headquarters for the Snowdonia Society until 2010. In 2012 it was turned again into a popular tearoom, run by Tim and Ayla Maddox, with beehives in the garden managed by the National Beekeeping Centre Wales.

In 2026 the Snowdonia Society announced they would be selling the house at public auction. A petition was raised demanding preservation of the building, signed by 850 people. Prospective bidders were warned they would need to install a new drainage and sewerage system, costing up to £80,000. The auction took place on 23 September 2026, with a guide price of £199,000 but, despite bids reaching £219,000, this failed to reach the seller's reserve price. Tearoom owner, Jane Davies, confirmed she already had arranged to close the cafe the following weekend.
