= Plas y Brenin =

UK National outdoor centre in Wales

Coordinates: 53.10192°N 3.91779°W

Plas y Brenin, located in Conwy County Borough, Wales, is a National Outdoor Centre owned by Sport England. The centre is situated in Dyffryn Mymbyr (Mymbyr Valley), Snowdonia and is less than a quarter of a mile south-west of the centre of Capel Curig on the A4086 road.

== History ==
In the late 18th century, Richard Pennant, 1st Baron Penrhyn, built a road from Bangor through the Nant Ffrancon and Dyffryn Ogwen to Betws-y-Coed, and eventually through to Shrewsbury (in use by 1798). In 1801, Lord Penrhyn built the then named Capel Curig Inn. In 1808 the Mail coach which ran from Holyhead to Shrewsbury began running via Capel Curig. The Mail coach ceased operation in 1848 following the opening of the Chester and Holyhead Railway. The inn was not built on the road (now the A5), but some distance from it on the present site to facilitate enjoyment of the superb view of Llynnau Mymbyr (the lakes) and the Snowdon horseshoe.

Sometime between 1869 and 1871 the building's name was changed again from the Capel Curig Hotel to the Royal Hotel. Since its opening in 1801 the most famous guests over the years have been Queen Victoria, Edward VII, George V, and Edward VIII. Other well-known people who have visited included Charles Lennox, 4th Duke of Richmond on 6 September 1807 (there is a plaque commemorating his visit), Sir Joseph Paxton (1856) (designer of The Crystal Palace), Bishop Samuel Wilberforce (1858), Lord Byron (1813) and Sir Walter Scott (1818). Some distinguished visitors to the hotel etched their names into the windows of the then cocktail bar (now the reception area); these were still in place into the 1970s.

"The Royal Hotel" main entrance view (late 19th century)

"The Royal Hotel" with "Pont y Bala" in the foreground

The Royal Hotel gardens (late 19th century)

Llynnau Mymbyr and the Snowdon Horseshoe.

== Latterly ==
In 1955 the Royal Hotel was renamed "Plas y Brenin", which means "The King's Mansion" in Welsh, as a memorial to King George VI, whose trust fund had bought the building for use by The Central Council of Physical Recreation (CCPR) and it became "The Snowdonia National Recreation Centre". Plas y Brenin was visited by H.R.H. the Duke of Edinburgh (president of the CCPR) on 1 June 1956.

G.I. Milton was its first Warden/Director. John A Jackson, initially Chief Instructor for two years, became its second Director from 1960 to 1976. This was to be Plas y Brenin's formative and hard-fought period and it eventually became the "gold standard" for other such centres around the world.

The earliest outdoor courses such as horse riding, surveying, subaqua and flyfishing were later discontinued. Less well known sports such as archery and even javelin were taught; these sports were located in a cellar underneath what is now the dining room.

A less well-known activity was that of "Farmers' Night" which was instigated very early on and still continues today. Its function was to foster good relations, not only with local farmers but with people who lived in Capel Curig.

== Present ==
Plas y Brenin is now a vibrant outdoor centre and is managed by the Mountain Training Trust (MTT), on behalf of Sport England, and is one of three remaining National Centres owned by the sports council, the others being Lilleshall Hall and Bisham Abbey. It is widely regarded as providing gold standard instruction in all aspects of mountaineering, mountain biking and paddling, as well as in rescue. It also supports a range of organisations to develop new coaching and leadership awards, and works with a broad range of groups to get more people active in the outdoors as part of its national centre role.

MTT is a registered charity, set up by the British Mountaineering Council and the training boards, Mountain Training UK and Mountain Training England, primarily to run the centre. The latter point should be considered as a justification of the original intent of Plas y Brenin that for the first twenty five years of the existence of the centre that the British Mountaineering Council treated the existence of Plas y Brenin with a deal of politically motivated negativity.

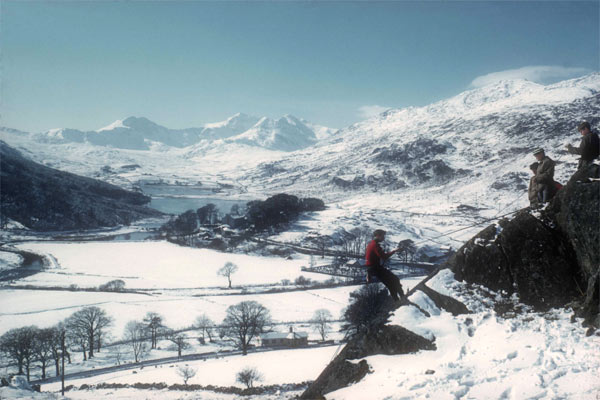
View from the Pinnacles, over the old Turnpike, St. Julitta's Church, Plas y Brenin, Llynnau Mymbyr, Dyffryn Mymbyr, Nant y Gwryd and the Snowdon Horseshoe.

Plas y Brenin is uniquely positioned below Llynnau Mymbyr at the foot of Dyffryn Mymbyr, the broad valley leading to the Pen-y-Gwryd hotel and the Snowdon Horseshoe. The centre's purpose is to offer the highest quality training courses, playing a key role in developing the people who develop the sector. A broad range of courses are offered under the 'climb, hike, paddle, bike' banner in addition to holding a range of cpd events for a broad range of groups – from those active in university clubs to those working professionally in the outdoors. Courses are run all year round, not only at Plas y Brenin in Snowdonia but in the north west of Scotland and in the Alps.

On site facilities include:

- 13m climbing wall and a training wall
- Indoor canoe training pool (6m x 3m)
- Fitness room

There is accommodation with up to 65 beds. There are also conference and function room facilities, a large lecture space, a dining room, bar (with one of the best views in Snowdonia) and stores / shop (which hires equipment to the public).

== Reading ==
- "This Splendid Enterprise – The First Fifty Years of Plas y Brenin The National Mountain Centre (UK)", by Lyndsay King, Published 2006, ISBN 978-0-9554675-0-9
- "The First Fifty Years of the British Mountaineering Council", Published 1997, ISBN 0-903908-07-7. The opening gambit in the Introduction reads: 'It (the BMC) exists to further the interests of mountaineering as a whole, and it will succeed in this only in as far as it receives the full support of each and every mountaineer...It should be needless to add that there will be no attempt to introduce anything so foolish as a qualification scheme for mountain leaders.' G.A.Dummett, Pembroke College, Cambridge, 1946.
