= Cowlyd Tramway =

Railway in north Wales (20th century)

Coordinates: 53°09′22″N 3°53′12″W

Overview
- Headquarters: Dolgarrog
- Locale: Wales
- Dates of operation: c. 1916–c. 1968
- Successor: Abandoned

Technical
- Track gauge: 2 ft (610 mm)
- Length: 4 miles (6.4 km)

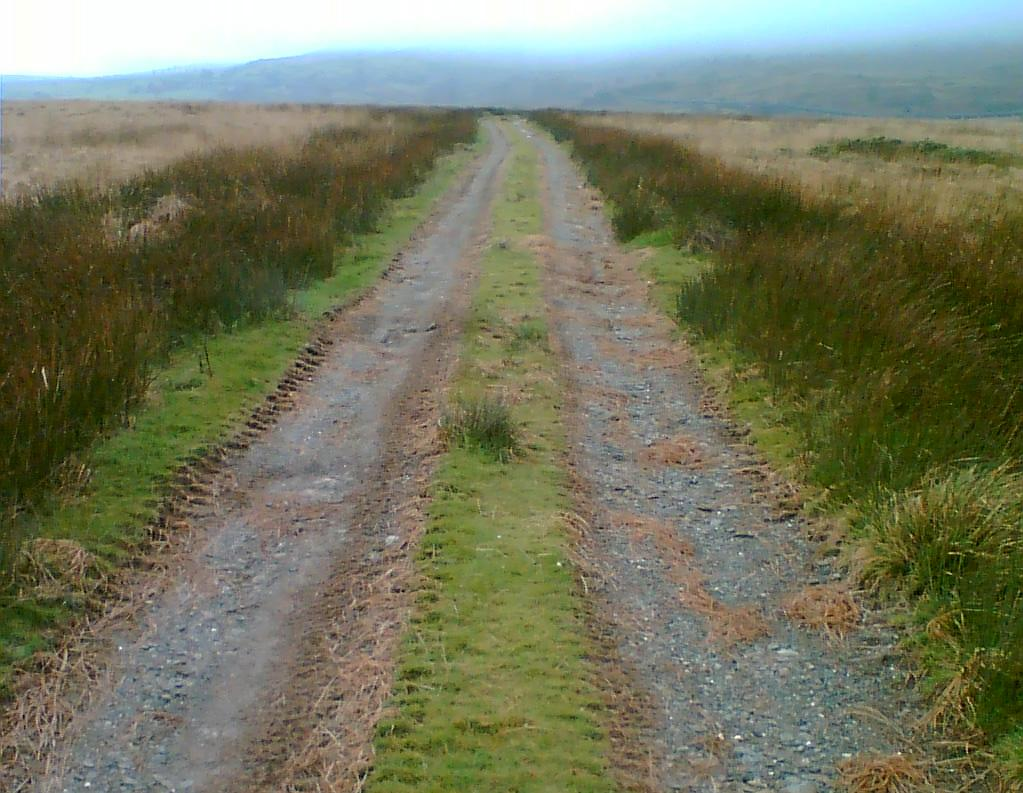
Part of the route of the tramway - now an access road.

The Cowlyd Tramway was a 2 ft (610 mm) narrow gauge railway line used to convey men and materials to Llyn Cowlyd Reservoir, near Trefriw in northern Wales during the enlargement of the dam, and thereafter for maintenance purposes.

== History ==
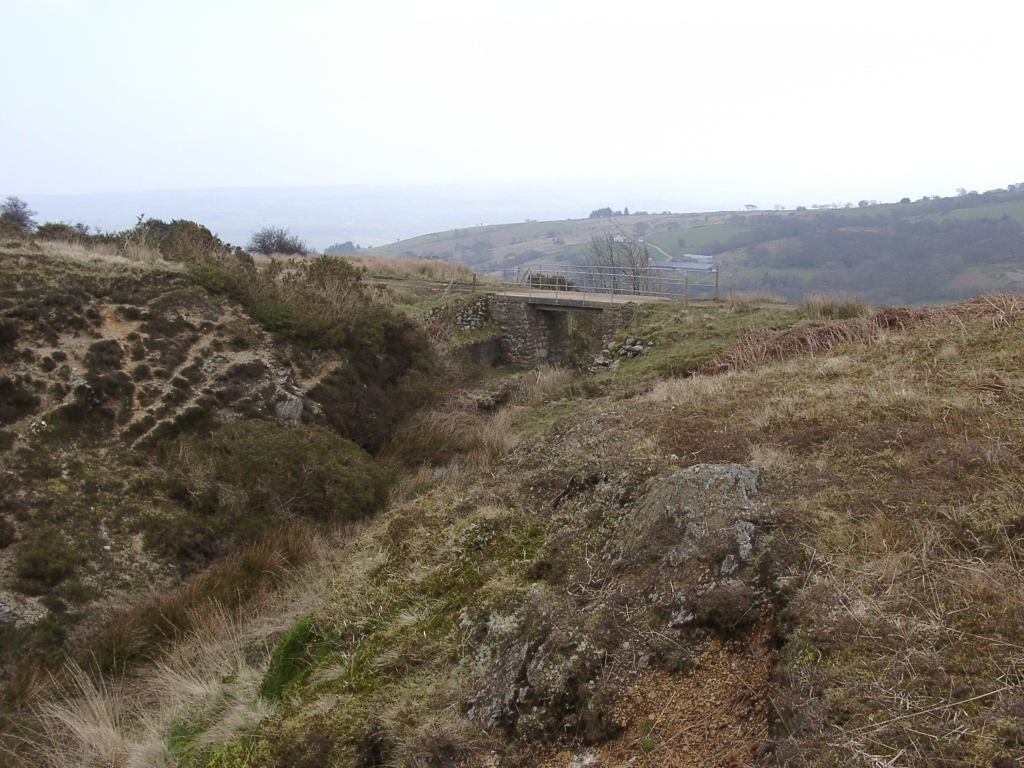
The tramway at the point where it passed over the former Ardda mine workings & tramway.

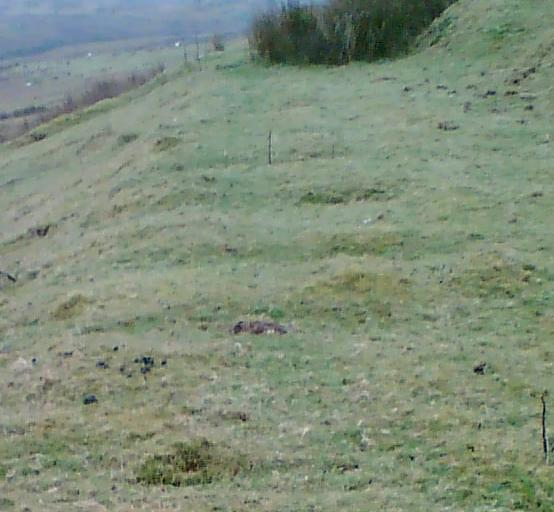
indentations in the turf show where sleepers have been removed. The minimal earthworks are evident.

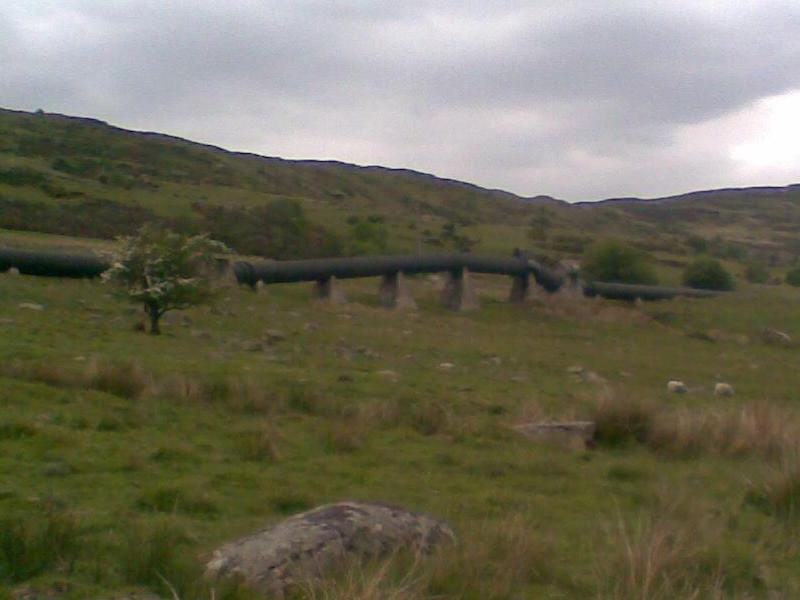
The pipeline from Llyn Cowlyd still has the 'hump' where it passed over the Tramway.

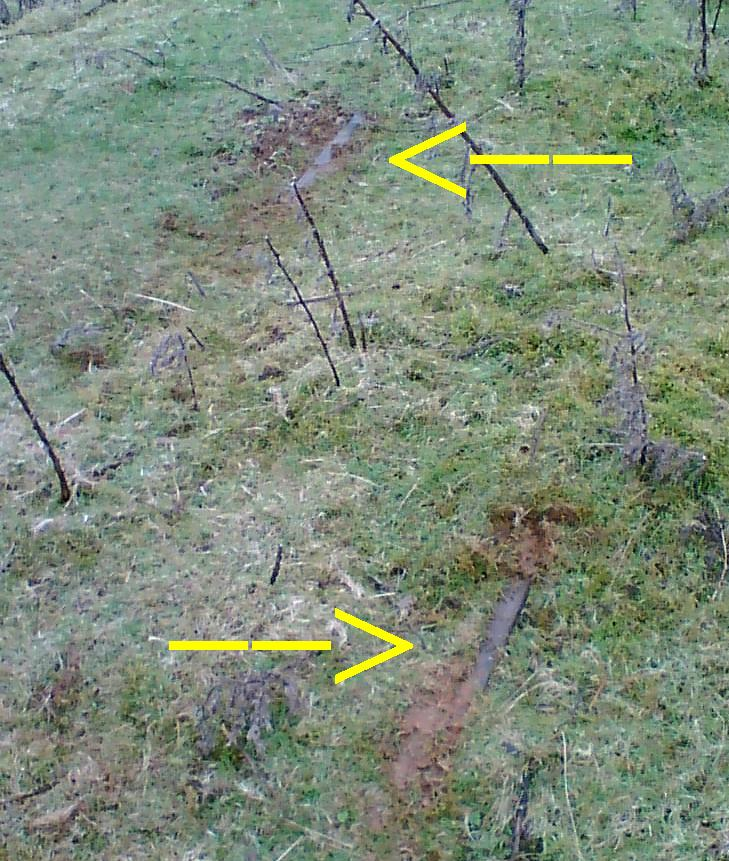
Remnants of rail, still evident under the grass.

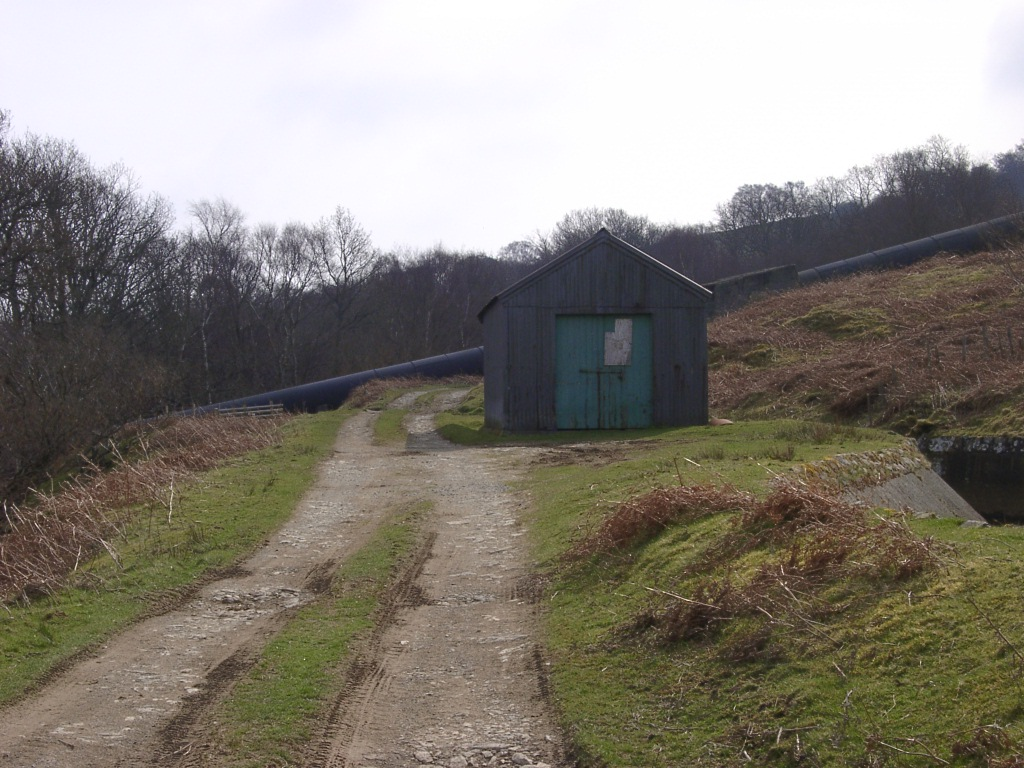
The loco shed and trackbed near its branch from the Eigiau tramway. The tramway ran away from the camera up to Llyn Cowlyd.

Llyn Cowlyd had been a reservoir since 1908, owned by the Conwy and Colwyn Bay Joint Water Supply Board. By 1915 rights to water extraction were also held by the Aluminium Corporation and the North Wales Power and Traction Co. Ltd., both of Dolgarrog, and a severe drought in this year prompted the decision to increase water reserves by building a much higher dam.

Construction of the Cowlyd Tramway began in 1916, and reached Llyn Cowlyd the following year. The dam was completed in December 1921, being built entirely from rock quarried from the adjacent mountainside, and was opened the following year in more favourable weather.

The tramway was essentially a branch line of the former Eigiau Tramway, built originally as a standard gauge tramway to serve Llyn Eigiau, and connected to the works at Dolgarrog by a series of rope-worked inclines which ran down the steep Dolgarrog escarpment.

The Eigiau Tramway was itself a successor to the narrow gauge Cedryn Quarry Tramway. At the time of the construction of the Cowlyd Tramway the Eigiau Tramway was re-gauged to the same narrow gauge so that the same locomotives could be used on both. After the collapse of the Eigiau dam in 1925, and the closure of that tramway, the inclines were only used by the Cowlyd Tramway.

== Route ==
From the top of the Dolgarrog inclines, near Coedty (where it branched from the Eigiau Tramway), the line ran for some 4 miles largely parallel to, and to the north of Afon Ddu. To the north-west lie the slopes of Moel Eilio, and to the south-east is the ridge of Cefn Cyfarwydd. The line ran up to Llyn Cowlyd dam, where it ended in two sidings and a loop.

About a mile above Coedty the tramway passed over the workings of the former Ardda sulphur and lead mine. Little remains of the smithy and office today. A tramway, built in 1853, and the earliest in the area, ran for a little over half a mile before descending an incline to the walled mine yard beside Pont Dolgarrog and the former Royal Oak Inn, now called the "Lord Newborough" after the landowner. By 1864 this tramway had closed.

The line for most of its length runs to the south of the water pipeline. However, it finished at the northern end of the dam, which means that at some point it must have passed below it, and this is evident between Siglen and the dam, where the pipe has a 'hump' to afford the necessary clearance.

== Locomotives ==
Two steam engines were used on the line during construction of the dam – the German built loco Eigiau (Orenstein & Koppel, No. 5668 of 1913), and a Bagnall 0-4-0ST, Works No.2080 of 1918.

Upon completion of the dam in 1922, with only maintenance work being envisaged, a Muir-Hill Fordson rail tractor was provided. Eigiau was taken off, pending sale, and eventually moved to Penrhyn Quarry in 1928. The Bagnall was removed by its owners, the contractors Sir Robert McAlpine & Sons and used on the construction of the Welsh Highland Railway.

In 1936 a new diesel tractor was acquired, a 20 hp 'Planet' (F. C. Hibberd & Co., No.1988 of 1936) and this was eventually replaced by a new Motor Rail 'Simplex' tractor, No.22154 of 1962. This was later named Dolgarrog and used in the 1970s to lay power cables alongside the Llanberis Lake Railway, this being followed by a spell on display in the Dolgarrog Power Station Museum, together with some wagons from the tramway.

"Dolgarrog" is currently on loan from Innogy – owners of Dolgarrog Power station, and in whose colours it is painted – and was used by the revived Welsh Highland Railway in the reconstruction of the narrow gauge line from Caernarfon to Porthmadog, and it remains there. This loan to the WHR is not without precedent – back in 1922/3 the original Welsh Highland construction contractors also made use of a steam locomotive which had previously been used here, namely the Bagnall.

== Closure ==
The tramway closed temporarily in 1968 after a derailment of a workmen's train, but in fact it never re-opened as it was deemed unsafe. The approach road from Trefriw, which had been extended in the mid-1960s anyway to a point close to the pipeline, was now simply extended further so that necessary vehicles could reach the reservoir. This resulted in some destruction of the former tramway route. It is reported that insufficient time and money had been spent on the construction of the line, which was of generally poor quality, and that maintenance after construction was also minimal.

== Remains ==
Today the whole route of the line between Coedty and Llyn Cowlyd is clearly evident. Where the metalled Trefriw access road ends at the gate, at Siglen, the route of the line between here and the dam runs higher up than the current dam access track, meaning that much of the formation has largely been untouched, and therefore much can be seen in the way of trackbed remains, including sleepers and rail. It is also apparent from these remains that the formation was, indeed, in places, of minimal standard.

In the other direction, between Siglen and Coedty, the formation has been widened to form an access track (for farm and pipeline vehicle access) and on these widened sections the rail has been recovered, leaving only minimal evidence of the line. Today the whole length of the tramway can easily be walked, particularly between Siglen and the top of the Dolgarrog inclines. It will be seen that the formation was of better construction towards Coedty, where there is an embankment and some small cuttings.

The loco shed is still evident close to the top of the highest incline, near the point where the Cowlyd tramway branched off the Eigiau tramway. Unlike the lower inclines, this one has not subsequently been utilized by the pipelines running down to Dolgarrog. At its head is an abandoned corrugated iron winding shed, a replacement for an earlier one. Although the inclines were originally three separate ones, they were latterly worked as one, though the three sections were of different inclinations, the middle and upper sections each being less steep than the one below. The haulage cable was continuous and was still in place in 1973 as was the track.

It is commonly held that the rail used on some of the cattle-grids on the Trefriw to Cowlyd access road came from the former tramway, but comparison of the two reveals clearly that the tramway rail was considerably lighter, and would not be sufficiently heavy for this later use. It is more likely that it came from the Eigiau tramway, which at one time carried standard gauge engines, and would have been laid in heavier rail.

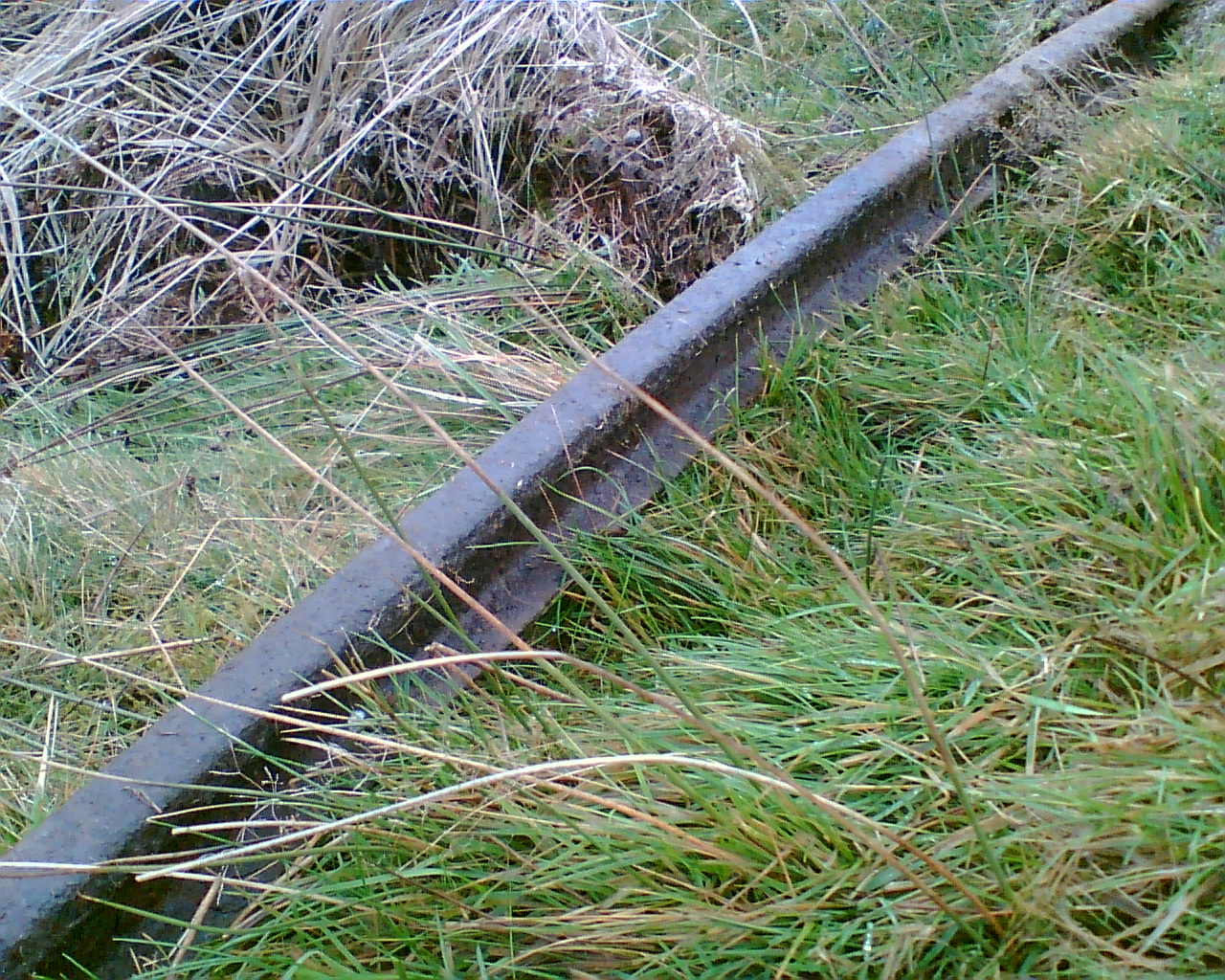
An unrecovered length of rail.

The remains of the highest incline above Dolgarrog. The former winding house can also be seen (top right) as can the former loco shed (top left).

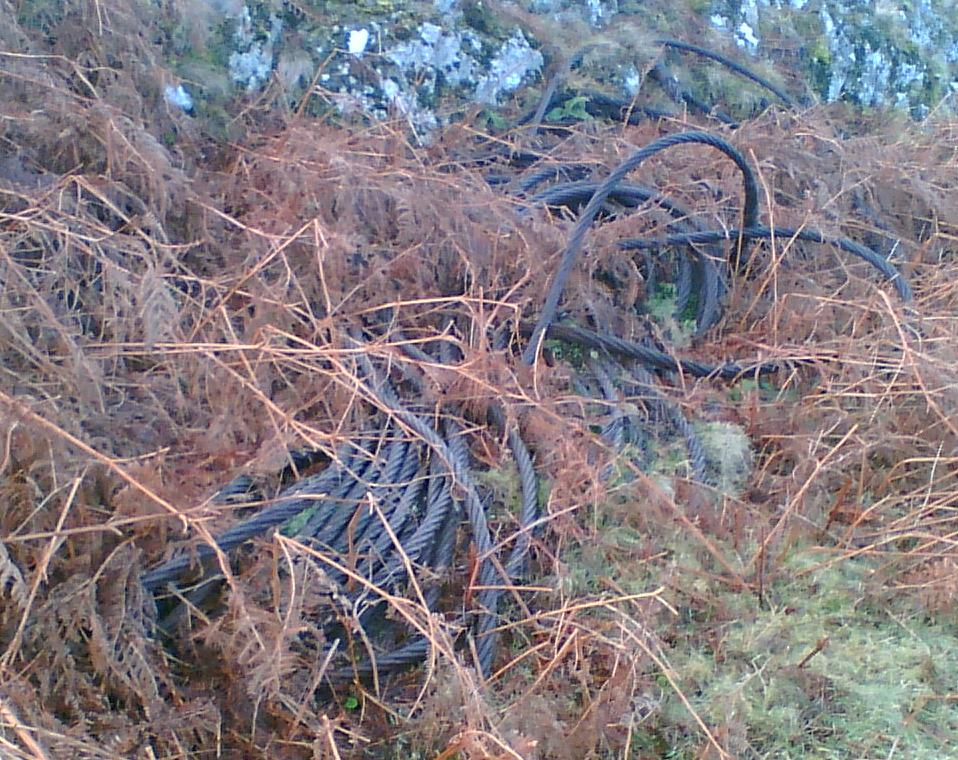
Near the top of the incline are the discarded remains of the cables used for hauling engines up the incline

Part of the formation, reinforced by sections of rail - in remarkably good condition.

Part of the formation at the Dolgarrog end.

== See also ==
- Eigiau Tramway
- Cedryn Quarry Tramway
- British industrial narrow gauge railways
