= Reservoir safety =

Risk prevention of reservoir dam failure

Reservoirs storing large volumes of water have the capability of causing considerable damage and loss of life if they fail. Reservoirs are considered "installations containing dangerous forces" under international humanitarian law because of their potential adverse impact. In 1975 the failure of the Banqiao Reservoir Dam and other dams in Henan Province, China caused more casualties than any other dam failures in history. The disaster killed an estimated 171,000 people and 11 million people lost their homes.

Because reservoirs and their containing dams present such significant potential risks many countries have put legislation in place and set safety standards, but it was not until 1930 that effective legislation was first approved for control of the design, construction and maintenance of dams and reservoirs when the Reservoirs (Safety Provisions) Act 1930 was enacted in the United Kingdom.

== Causes of failure ==
Although failure is often portrayed as a catastrophic failure of the dam wall to contain the mass of water held up behind the dam, there a number of significant other causes of failure. These include:

- Inadequate spillway capacity resulting in water overtopping the dam wall and cascading down the unprotected wall causing erosion and eventually collapse
- The dam inadequately bonded to the underlying rock allowing seepage under the dam wall resulting in erosion and undercutting of the dam.
- Insufficient geological surveying pre-construction allowing water to seep out at a location away from the dam and erode a new discharge channel.
- Spillway of inadequate construction allowing erosion and degradation of the face of the dam from routine discharges.
- Geological subsidence because of poor geology, mining or oil extraction.
- Inadequate capacity of discharge pipework because of blocking or corrosion.
- Inadequate design for actual rainfall events

== Status by country ==
Not all countries have specific legislative control over the safety of dams and reservoirs, and a number of those that do have legislation have it at State or province level only. Some such as the US have both Federal and State legislation. In some, such as Australia legislation is at State level but only some states have relevant legislation.

=== Australia ===
Australia issued "Guidelines on Dam Safety Management in 1994" but specific safety legislation is enacted at State level. New South Wales, Queensland and Victoria have all enacted legislation. In Queensland a concept of a "referable dam" is used to determine whether the legislation applies. A referable dam is defined by a number of criteria including a height exceeding 8 metres (26 ft) and a volume of 500 cubic metres (110×10^{3} imp gal) . A number of other conditions and caveats apply. In New South Wales the Dams Safety Act establishes an expert committee to oversee surveillance of "prescribed" dams. The list of prescribed dams is not based on height or volumes but is a list contained in a schedule to the Act.

=== New Zealand ===
The government of New Zealand is consulting the public about the proposal to establish legislative control over the design, construction and monitoring of dams and reservoirs. The consultation include proposed definitions of "classifiable" dams which would be either "at or above 4 metres in height and 20,000 cubic metres in volume; or less than 4 metres in height, but at or above 30,000 cubic metres in volume". The document acknowledges the special issues facing New Zealand because of the frequency of potentially damaging earthquakes.

=== United Kingdom ===
In Britain, the demand for water for the many industries that flourished in the Industrial Revolution and the need for drinking water for the thousands of workers who had migrated from the countryside to the cities for work, put great strains on the water supply infrastructure and led to the construction of many reservoirs in the hillier parts of the country, especially in the Pennines and mid and north Wales. In the absence of any legislation or control of quality or design it was inevitable that failures would occur and by 1863 at least 12 dams had failed causing loss of life.

In 1864 a newly constructed dam at Dale Dyke near Sheffield failed as the reservoir was being filled and the resultant out-wash killed 244 people. As a result, a draft bill requiring dams and reservoirs to have their plans and the construction approved by an independent competent person was written in 1865 but was lost when there was change of government.

==== Reservoirs (Safety Provisions) Act 1930 ====
Reservoirs (Safety Provisions) Act 1930 (Note: Section 12(1).)
- Act of Parliament
- Parliament of the United Kingdom
- Long title: An Act to impose, in the interests of safety, precautions to be observed in the construction, alteration, and use of reservoirs, and to amend the law with respect to liability for damage and injury caused by the escape of water from reservoirs.
- Citation: 20 & 21 Geo. 5. c. 51
- Territorial extent: England and Wales; Scotland; (Note: Section 12(3).)

Dates
- Royal assent: 1 August 1930
- Commencement: 1 January 1931 (Note: Section 12(2).)
- Repealed: 1 April 1987 (Note: The Reservoirs Act 1975 (Commencement No. 4) Order 1986.)
Other legislation
Amended by	Water Resources Act 1963
Repealed by	Reservoirs Act 1975

Status: Repealed

Text of statute as originally enacted

The Reservoirs (Safety Provisions) Act 1930 (20 & 21 Geo. 5. c. 51) entered the statute book following the coupled failure of two reservoirs in North Wales. Llyn Eigiau and the Coedty Reservoir were two relatively small reservoirs. On a wet November night, Eigiau failed and the out-wash overwhelmed Coedty 2.5 miles downstream. Sixteen villagers in Dolgarrog were killed.

The new act applied to reservoirs holding more than 5 million imp gal (0.023 million m^{3}) and mandated that construction had to be supervised by a qualified engineer and the filling of the reservoir also had to be supervised and certified. It also set out for the first time an inspection requirement that every qualifying reservoir had to be inspected every ten years by an engineer included on a published list or panel of engineers. These panels were compiled by the relevant Secretary of State in liaison with the president of the Institution of Civil Engineers. Since the act came into force no lives have been lost in any reservoir or dam failure in the UK.

==== Reservoirs Act 1975 ====
Reservoirs Act 1975 (Note: Section 30(1).)
- Act of Parliament
- Parliament of the United Kingdom
- Long title: An Act to make further provision against escapes of water from large reservoirs or from lakes or lochs artificially created or enlarged.
- Citation: 1975 c. 23
- Territorial extent: England and Wales; Scotland; (Note: Section 30(2).)

Dates
- Royal assent: 8 May 1975
- Commencement: 30 November 1983 (Note: The Reservoirs Act 1975 (Commencement No. 1) Order 1983.); 1 April 1986 (Note: The Reservoirs Act 1975 (Commencement No. 2) Order 1985.); 1 April 1986 (Note: The Reservoirs Act 1975 (Commencement No. 3) Order 1986.)1 April 1987 (Note: The Reservoirs Act 1975 (Commencement No. 4) Order 1986.); (Note: Section 29(1).)
Other legislation
Repeals/revokes	Reservoirs (Safety Provisions) Act 1930

Status: Amended

Text of statute as originally enacted

Revised text of statute as amended

Text of the Reservoirs Act 1975 as in force today (including any amendments) within the United Kingdom, from legislation.gov.uk.

Despite the success of the 1930 act, further legislation was brought onto the statute books with the Reservoirs Act 1975 (c. 23). The new legislation recognised that more significant people were involved in the design and construction of a dam and the impoundment and it assigned accountabilities to those identified players. It also raised the volume threshold to 25 thousand m^{3} (5.5 million imp gal) and "provides the legal framework within which qualified civil engineers make technical decisions."

It also introduced the roles of supervising engineer and enforcement authority – a role assigned to the appropriate local authority. However, implementation of the act took from 10 to 12 years so it was not fully implemented until 1987. In 2004 the role of enforcement authority in England and Wales was reassigned to the Environment Agency.

=== United States ===
A series of severe dam failures in the 1970s prompted Congress to take action. These failures included Buffalo Creek, West Virginia which failed, devastating a 16-mile valley and killing 125 people. As a result, Congress enacted Public Law 92–367 in November 1977 which authorized the U.S. Army Corps of Engineers to inventory and inspect non-Federal dams.

The Water Resources Act 1986 established a National Dam Safety Review Board although there was not a National Dam Safety Program until 1986. The legislation authorising this program was last amended by The Dam Safety Act of 2006.

Although some 79 people were killed by dam failures in 1979 at the Laurel Run Dam and at the Kelly Barnes Dam, it is likely that only a single death in the US has been caused by subsequent failures which was below the failed Spencer Dam.

=== Western Europe ===
The legislation varies on a country by county basis across Europe. Italy and Spain both have a minimum reservoir capacity of 1,000 million m^{3} (220,000 million imp gal). France sets a minimum height of 20 metres (66 ft) while Spain and Portugal and Austria all set a minimum height of 15 metres (49 ft) but each with different volume minima.
