= Cedryn Quarry Tramway =

Narrow gauge industrial railway in North Wales

Coordinates: 53.185°N 3.841°W

Overview
- Headquarters: Dolgarrog
- Locale: Wales
- Dates of operation: c. 1861–c. 1888
- Successor: Eigiau Tramway

Technical
- Track gauge: 2 ft (610 mm)
- Length: 4 miles

The Cedryn Quarry Tramway (later largely used as the route of the Eigiau Tramway) was an industrial narrow gauge railway that connected the slate quarries at Cedryn and Cwm Eigiau to the quays at Dolgarrog in the Conwy valley.

== History ==
The Cedryn quarry is first recorded in 1827. The output of this remote site was initially taken by horse pack to the quays on the River Conwy at Dolgarrog. A five-mile (8.0 km) tramway was constructed in the period 1861–1863. The gauge was approximately 2 ft (610 mm) narrow gauge and was built using wrought iron T section rails.

Some time before 1866 this tramway was extended one mile (1.6 km) to Cwm Eigiau Quarry, and the name "Cwm Eigiau Tramway" largely became synonymous with that of the Cedryn Tramway. The Caedryn [sic] Slate Quarry Co. Ltd of 1863 became in 1874 the Caedryn [sic] & Cwm Eigiau Slate Co. Ltd, but was dissolved just 11 years later, the slate being of a poor quality.

By 1907, when the route was used for a new tramway to assist in the building of the dam at Llyn Eigiau, all rails had been removed. This new tramway, the Eigiau Tramway, was initially built to the wider standard gauge, and used steam engines. It followed the route of the Cedryn Tramway except that the small incline above Coedty was by-passed to the north.

== Route ==
The tramway started at the foot of the quarry exit incline and passed over the Afon Eigiau on a wooden trestle. It crossed the Eigiau again at Bont-y-Cedryn and then skirted the site of what is now the Eigiau Reservoir. Passing the col at Hafod-y-Rhiw the line ran along a series of low stone embankments to the top of a short incline above Coedty.

Below Coedty, and just before the top of the Dolgarrog inclines, the line passed the point where the Cowlyd Tramway was later to branch off. The line continued to the top of the Dolgarrog escarpment which it descended via three steep inclines. These were later used as locomotive access by the Eigiau and Cowlyd Tramways, and are today utilized by the two large pipes which carry water to the aluminum works. The lowest incline passed through a short tunnel under the main road at Tyddyn Isaf, and this former incline and tunnel can be seen today adjacent to the former (wooden) community centre. From here the tramway continued across the marshland to the edge of the River Conwy at Porth Llwyd wharf.

The lowest incline was later abandoned in favour of a new incline built slightly to the north, and today the pipelines take this newer route.

== See also ==
- British narrow gauge slate railways
