= Afon Ddu =

Name of several rivers in Snowdonia, Wales

Coordinates: 53°10′51″N 3°49′58″W

Afon Ddu (Welsh for black river) is the name of several rivers in Snowdonia in north-west Wales:

- The largest of these flows from Llyn Cowlyd on the south-eastern edge of the Carneddau range to join the river Conwy, passing Pont Dolgarrog on the B5106 road, just south of the village of Dolgarrog. The gorge cut by the river at this point is popular for gorge walking, the river passing at this point through a Site of Special Scientific Interest for broadleaved woodland and a number of rare species of plant.
- Another is a stream draining the south-eastern slopes of Drum and Foel-fras, mountains in the Carneddau mountain range. It is a tributary of Afon Dulyn, itself is a tributary of the river Conwy.
- A third is a stream flowing north-west from Bwlch y Ddeufaen. It is a tributary of the Afon Llanfairfechan, joining it immediately above the village of Llanfairfechan.
- A fourth is a tributary of the River Dysynni in the northern Dysynni Valley, famed for Craig y Deryn.
