= Eigiau Tramway =

Narrow-gauge railway in Wales

Coordinates: 53.185°N 3.844°W

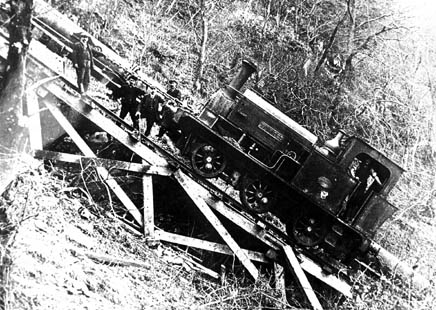
- A standard-gauge locomotive being hauled up the second of the Dolgarrog inclines. This timberwork is still visible today.

Overview
- Headquarters: Dolgarrog
- Locale: Wales
- Dates of operation: c. 1907–c. 1971
- Successor: Abandoned

Technical
- Track gauge: 2 ft (610 mm)

The Eigiau Tramway might refer to the Eigiau Quarry Tramway or to the Eigiau Reservoir Tramway.

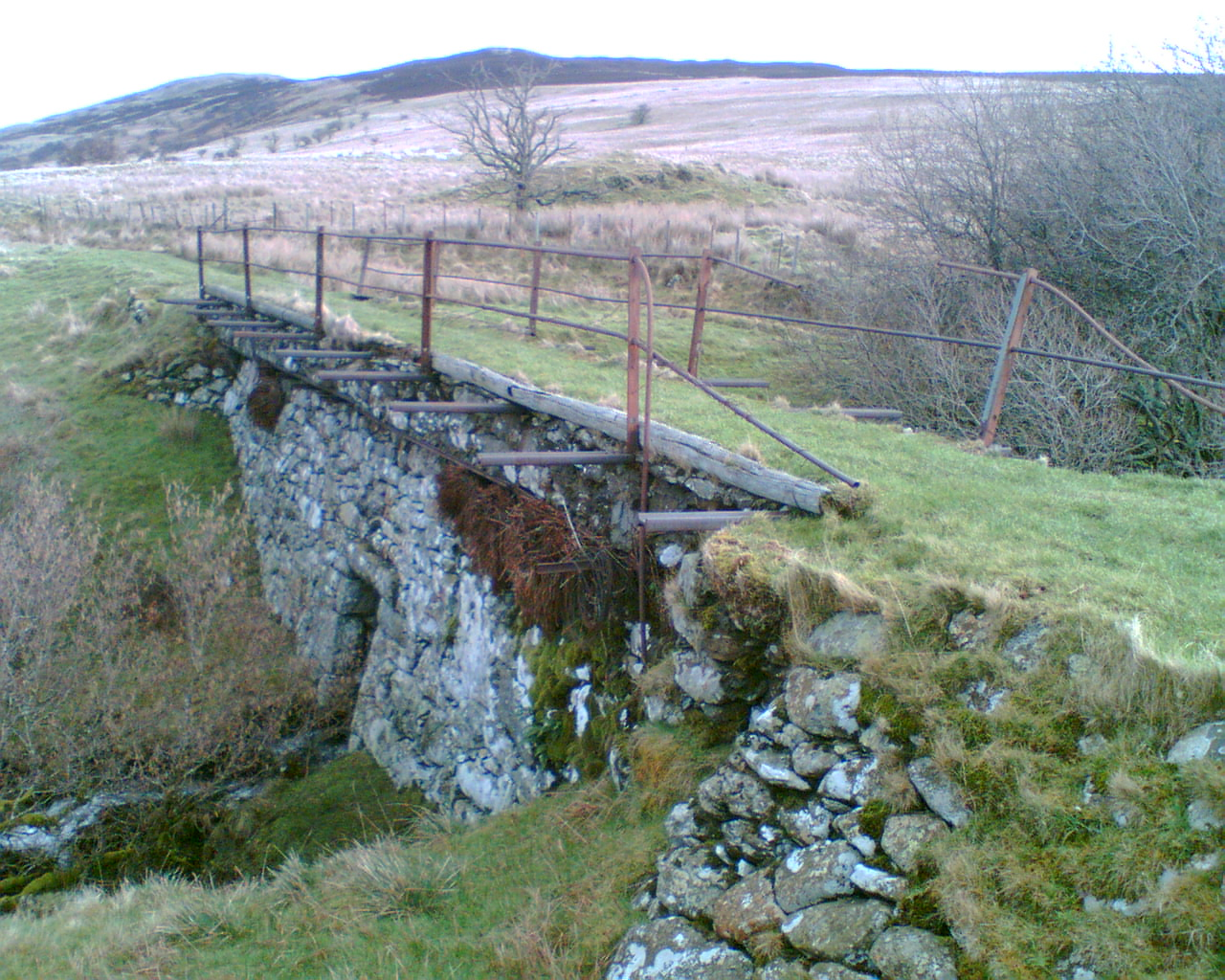
A surviving bridge on the route of the Eigiau Tramway

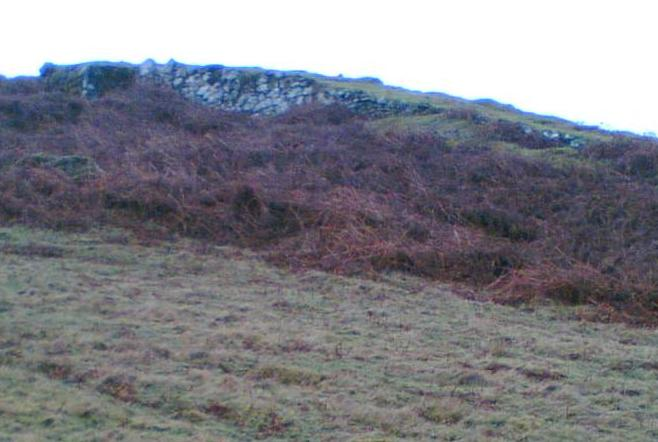
The remains of the highest incline, by Coedty

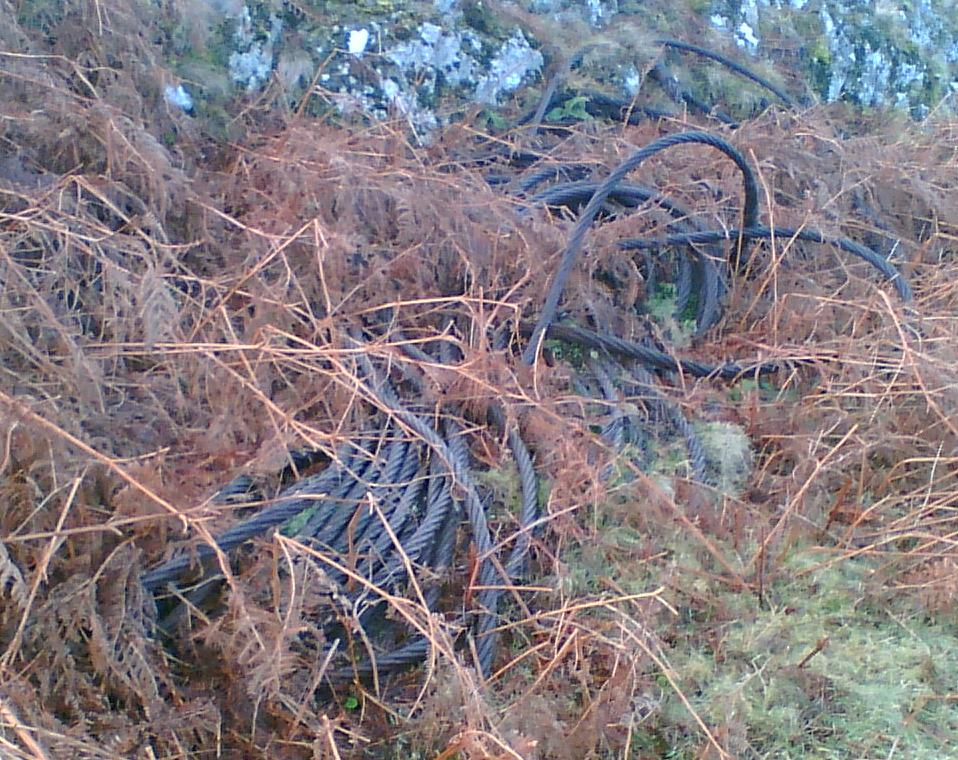
At the foot of the highest incline lie the remains of cables

== Eigiau Quarry Tramway ==
The Eigiau Quarry Tramway was a 2 ft (610 mm) narrow gauge, mile-long, horse-powered tramway which operated from c1863 to c1888 and served the Cwm Eigiau quarry (SH702635), near Llyn Eigiau in Caernarfonshire, Wales. The tramway was an extension of the 4-mile (6.4 km) Cedryn Quarry Tramway, operating from c1860 to serve the Cedryn slate quarry (SH719636), a little to the south-west of Llyn Eigiau. The tramway linked these two quarries to Dolgarrog in the Conwy valley.

In 1861 the North Wales Chronicle referred to "Tenders invited to construct a tram-road 5 miles (8.0 km) long from Cwm Eigia [sic] slate quarry to River Conwy". However, the tramway was initially only built as far as Cedryn, and in 1863 the Caernarvon & Denbigh Herald advertised for a contractor to extend west to Cwm Eigiau Quarry. It is entirely possible that the first reference to "Cwm Eigia slate quarry" was in fact a reference to Cedryn, for this quarry was located in Cwm Eigiau.

The mile extension was built some time before 1866, and it is likely that the name "Cwm Eigiau Tramway" became largely synonymous with that of the Cedryn Tramway. Indeed the Caedryn [sic] Slate Quarry Co. Ltd of 1863 became in 1874 the Caedryn [sic] & Cwm Eigiau Slate Co. Ltd, but was dissolved just 11 years later, the slate being of a poor quality.

== Eigiau Reservoir Tramway ==
The Eigiau Reservoir Tramway was an industrial railway, built to standard gauge from about 1907 to aid the construction of the dam at Eigiau Reservoir. It largely followed the course of the Cedryn Tramway, including the inclines down to Dolgarrog. After the reservoir was completed the tramway continued in use to aid in maintenance of the reservoir and its associated feedpipes.

In 1916 the narrow gauge Cowlyd Tramway was begun, branching off the Eigiau Tramway at the head of the Dolgarrog inclines. The Eigiau Tramway (including the Dolgarrog inclines) was relaid to 2 ft (610 mm) narrow gauge.

A breach of the Eigiau dam on 2 November 1925, resulting in the death of 16 Dolgarrog villagers, effectively spelt the end of the Eigiau tramway, although a small extension was built in that year to aid the reconstruction of Coedty Dam, which also broke. Use of the Cowlyd tramway continued.

=== Route ===
The tramway ran from Llyn Eigiau, where temporary lines ran north along the line of the dam (which was 3/4 mile (1.2 km) in length), down to Dolgarrog. The line was built to standard gauge, and largely utilized the route of the former Cedryn/Eigiau Quarry tramway which ran along the lower slopes of Moel Eilio, though at Pwll Du, about 1/2 mile (0.8 km) above Coedty reservoir, a small northerly diversion was made in order to avoid a former small incline.

Below Coedty a series of steep inclines ran through Dolgarrog woods down to Dolgarrog. Formerly used to lower the quarry output, they were later used to haul materials for building the dam, and also for hauling steam engines up to the more level part of the tramway. Other than the highest incline, these inclines are now used by two very visible water pipes.

Today, whilst the line of the tramway can easily be followed, and makes a pleasant walk from Eigiau down to the head of the Dolgarrog inclines, there is no evidence of rails or sleepers of any kind. The loading gauge is quite clearly that of a standard gauge railway, and in places there is evidence of minor embankments, cuttings, and a bridge. Towards Llyn Eigiau the Tramway runs along a level path, though the gradients are greater through the woods immediately above Coedty.

=== Locomotives ===
Two steam locomotives were used on the Cowlyd Tramway: Eigiau built by Orenstein & Koppel in 1913 (works number 5668) property of the Aluminium Corporation, and Bagnall 0-4-0ST built in 1918 (works number 2080), property of Sir Robert McAlpine & Sons, the contractor for the construction. On completion of the dam in 1922, and with only maintenance work being needed for the dams, a Muir Hill-Fordson petrol-paraffin rail tractor was acquired, the Bagnall was taken away by McAlpine for use on the construction of the Welsh Highland Railway, and Eigiau was put up for sale, eventually moving to Penrhyn Quarry in 1928. Eigiau is now fully restored on the Bredgar and Wormshill Light Railway in Kent.

The Muir-Hill was replaced in 1936 by a 20 hp 'Planet' type locomotive built by F. C. Hibberd & Co., No 1988 of 1936.

In 1961, an order was placed by the CEGB to Motor Rail of Bedford for a Simplex loco, to replace the Hibberd loco. It was works No. 22154 of 1962 weighing 2.5 tons with a 28–30 h.p. 2LB diesel engine. It saw occasional use on the Cowlyd Tramway, until September 1973 when it was moved to the CEGB Llanberis contract in connection with cable-laying; it accompanied some ex-Dolgarrog wagons there. This loco is now named 'Dolgarrog' and was used for tracklaying on the revived Welsh Highland Railway; it remains there, on loan from Innogy.

== See also ==
- British industrial narrow gauge railways
