= Craiglwyn =

Hill in Conwy County Borough, Wales

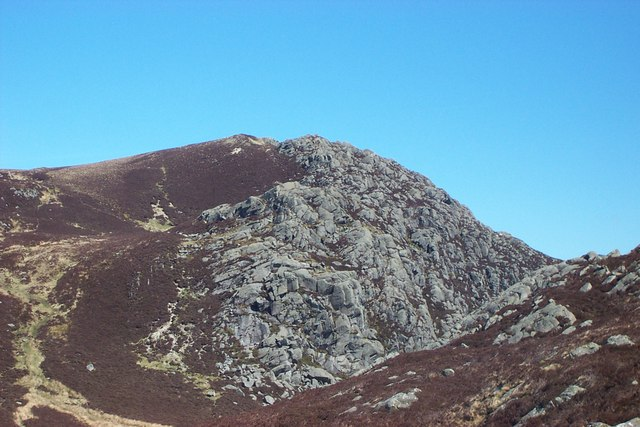
- Craiglwyn from the south.

Highest point
- Elevation: 623 m (2,044 ft)
- Prominence: 20 m (66 ft)
- Parent peak: Creigiau Gleision
- Listing: sub Hewitt, Nuttall
- Coordinates: 53.1300°N 3.8988°W

Geography
- Location: Conwy, Wales
- Parent range: Snowdonia
- OS grid: SH730608
- Topo map: OS Explorer OL 17

Craiglwyn is a top of Creigiau Gleision in Snowdonia, Wales, near Capel Curig. It lies at the south end of the Creigiau Gleision ridge, and offers good views of Carnedd Dafydd, Pen yr Helgi Du, Pen Llithrig y Wrach, Gallt yr Ogof, Tryfan and Moel Siabod.
