= Llyn Cowlyd =

Body of water in Snowdonia, north Wales

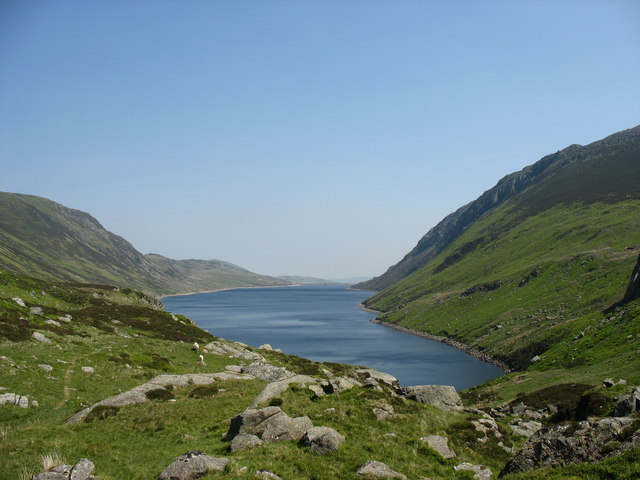
- View looking north-east down the length of the lake

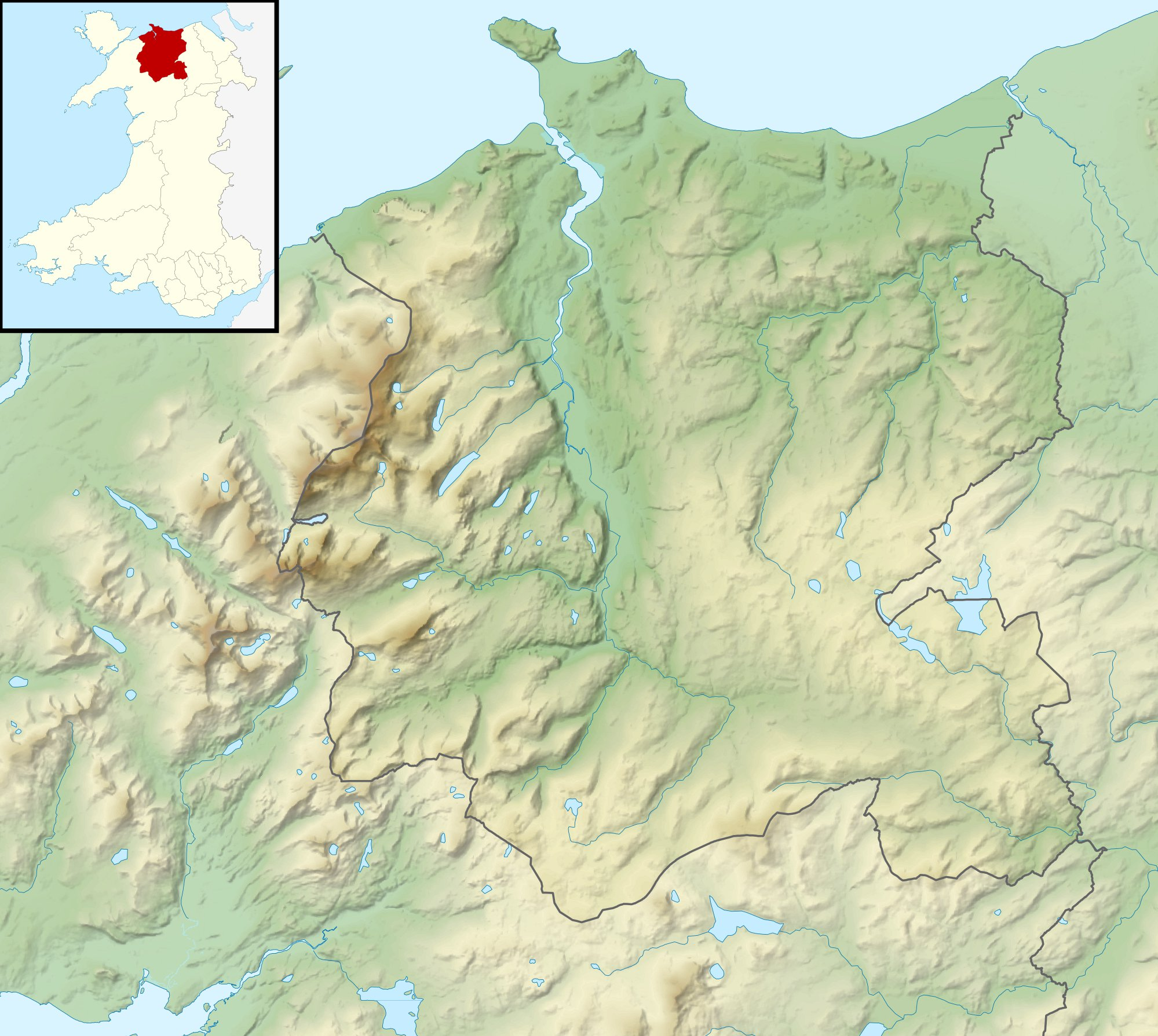
- Location within Conwy
- Location: Snowdonia National Park, Wales
- Coordinates: 53°08′N 3°55′W
- Type: natural lake, reservoir
- Basin countries: United Kingdom
- Surface area: 1.1 square kilometres (271.8 acres)
- Average depth: 33 m (108 ft)
- Max. depth: 70 m (230 ft)
- Surface elevation: 370 m (1,210 ft)

Llyn Cowlyd is the deepest lake in northern Wales. It is a reservoir in the Snowdonia National Park at the upper end of Cwm Cowlyd on the south-eastern edge of the Carneddau range of mountains, at a height of 370 metres (1,210 ft) above sea level. The lake is long and narrow, measuring 3.0 kilometres (1.9 mi) long and up to about 400 metres (440 yd) wide, and covers an area of about 1.1 square kilometres (270 acres). It has a mean depth of 33 metres (108 ft) and at its deepest has given soundings of 70 metres (230 ft), this being some 14 m (46 ft) greater than its natural depth, the water surface having been raised twice by the building of dams.

The surrounding hills drop steeply to the water's edge, from Cefn Cyfarwydd and Creigiau Gleision to the east, and Pen Llithrig y Wrach to the west, and as a consequence have not been forested in the 20th century, as were the slopes of neighbouring Llyn Crafnant. Indeed, there is not a tree to be seen, and the general aspect is one of bleakness. Dependent on the weather conditions, the waters often appear dark.

The supply of water to Llyn Cowlyd is assisted at its south-western end by a leat which runs roughly east–west, following the 418 metres (1,371 ft) contour, to the south and west of the lake, along the Llugwy valley. It is also fed by water from Llyn Eigiau.

Llyn Cowlyd can be reached by road from Trefriw, some 5 kilometres (3 mi) to the east, although the metalled road stops at a gate, around 1.2 km or 0.75 miles from the lake, beyond which private vehicles are not permitted. Llyn Cowlyd can also be reached by foot from Capel Curig, some 3.5 kilometres (2.2 mi) to the south, from the ridge of Cefn Cyfarwydd, or from above Dolgarrog. A good path runs along the north-western shore of the lake.

The stream which flows from Llyn Cowlyd, beyond the dam at the north-eastern end of the lake, is called Afon Ddu. This flows into the river Conwy, passing Pont Dolgarrog on the B5106 road, just south of the village of Dolgarrog. The gorge cut by the river at this point is popular for gorge walking.

== Origins of the name ==
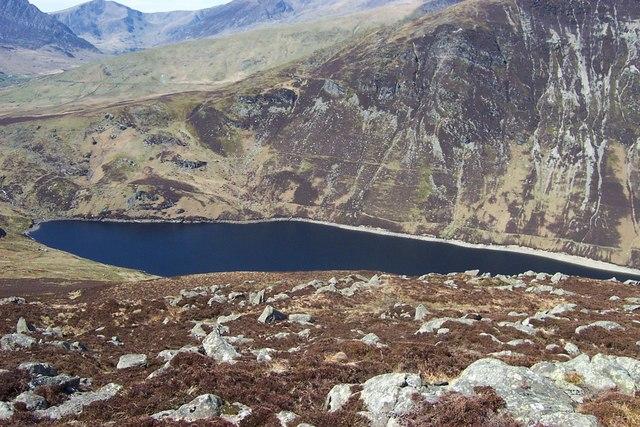
Llyn Cowlyd viewed from the summit of Creigiau Gleision

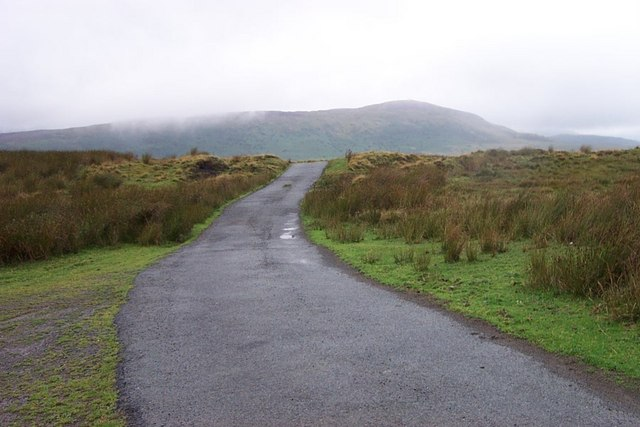
The access road to Llyn Cowlyd (from Trefriw), at its highest point on Cefn Cyfarwydd

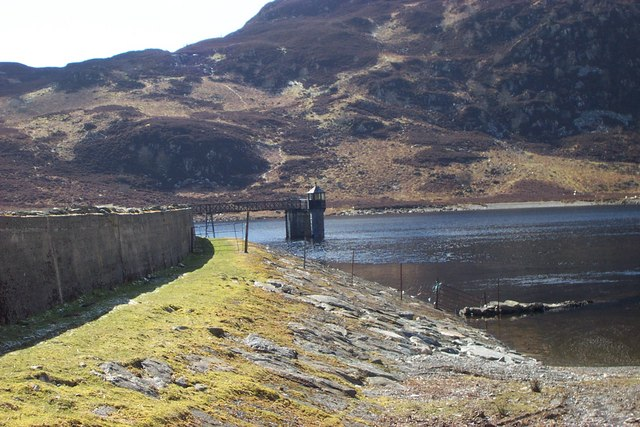
Llyn Cowlyd reservoir dam

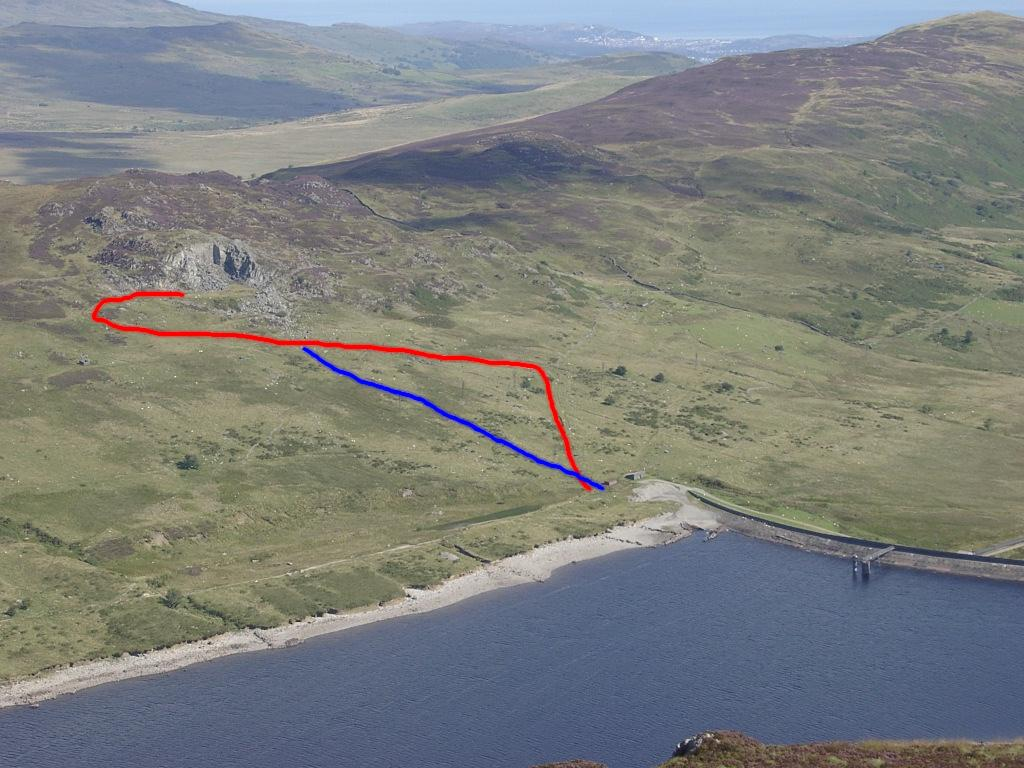
The dam viewed from Creigiau Gleision, showing the line of the incline to the quarry (blue), plus the line of a later vehicle track (red).

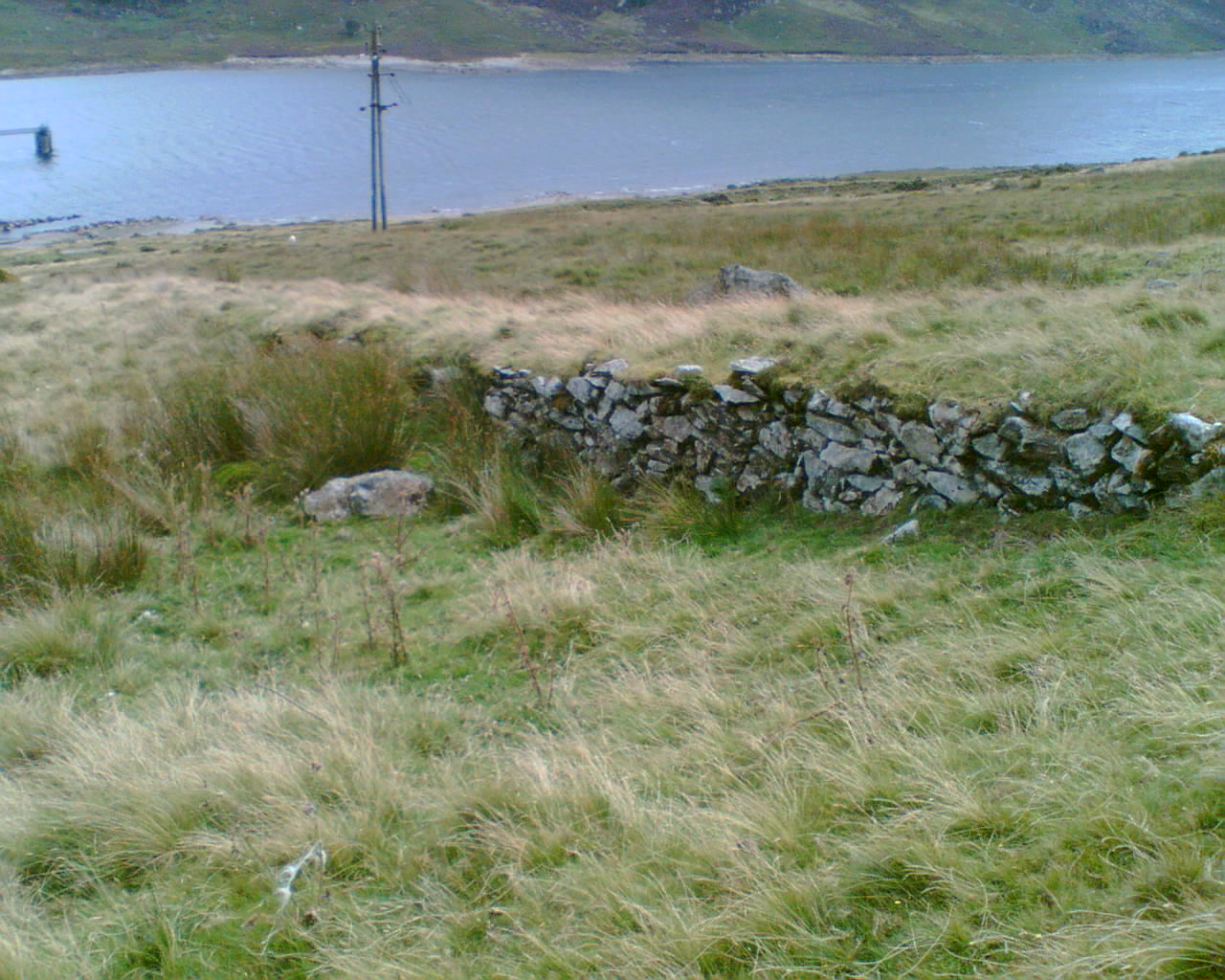
Remains of the construction incline, which ran from the quarry to the dam.

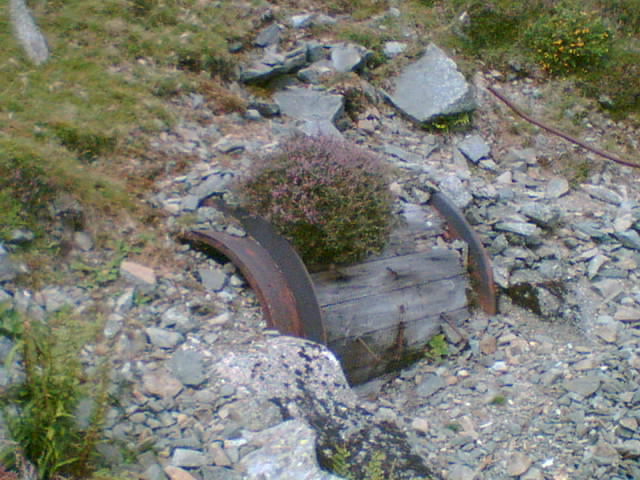
Remains of the winding drum at the head of the quarry incline, which ran down to the dam.

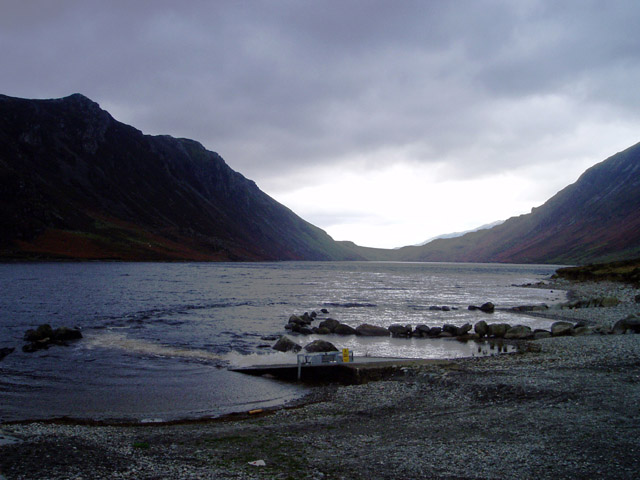
Llyn Cowlyd, just above the dam, at the point where water is piped in from Llyn Eigiau.

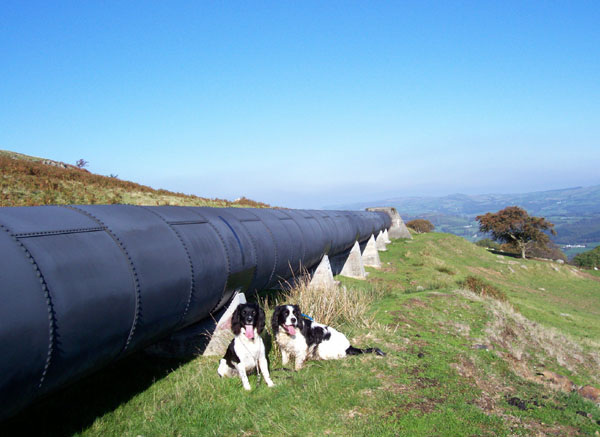
The pipeline running overground from Llyn Cowlyd.

Some sources state that the name Cowlyd comes from "Cawlwyd" or "Cawllwyd". Algernon Herbert's book Britannia after the Romans refers to Caw, Lord or Chieftain of Cwm Cawllwyd. "Cwm Cawllwyd" could therefore translate as The Cwm of Grey Caw.

Further research suggests that the name might derive originally from Caw ap Geraint Llyngesog ab Erbin ap Custennin Gorneu ap Cynfor ap Tudwal, the famous warrior who features in Culhwch and Olwen. Caw's son Celyn ap Caw had a watchtower, Tŵr Celyn, near the Copper mountain, on Anglesey.

The Ordnance Survey map of 1841 records the name as "Cwlyd", as does the National Gazetteer of 1868.

== Reservoir ==
The lake is a reservoir, providing water for the towns of Conwy and Colwyn Bay, having been purchased for £55,000 by the Conway and Colwyn Bay Joint Water Supply Board, a joint authority set up in 1891, via a pipe network some 60 kilometres (40 mi) long. However, these pipes are underground, their presence only given away by the chamber covers at Siglen, and the occasional isolated pump-house along the route. These water supply pipes should not be confused with the large (1.77m or 5 ft 10 in diameter) black pipeline which runs for 3 km (5 miles) from the dam to Dolgarrog, and serves the power station there, built in 1925, to support the aluminum works. During World War II a shepherd called Wil Roberts was paid a nominal sum of money to check the pipeline for bomb damage or any signs of sabotage. His only find was a crashed Anson aircraft in February 1944. The water mains from Cowlyd are interconnected by means of cross-overs at various points with those which were laid by the Llandudno Improvement Commissioners (later duplicated by the Llandudno Urban District Council) from their source, Llyn Dulyn. This was to provide continuity of supply to each reticulation in case of emergency. In 1965, local water undertakings were grouped together under the control of the Conway Valley Water Board, whose Engineer and Manager, Joseph M. Campbell, was the last Engineer to Conway and Colwyn Bay Joint Water Supply Board. Since the 1990s, the Llandudno system has been supplied from Cowlyd when Dulyn transferred for generating purposes.

Llyn Cowlyd is one of two reservoirs which supply hydro-electricity to the aluminium works at Dolgarrog. The other is Llyn Eigiau, which was physically connected to Llyn Cowlyd by a tunnel in 1919, and this is the water which flows into the lake by the dam. Water also flows from Llyn Eigiau more directly to Dolgarrog via Afon Porth-llwyd and Coedty reservoir. Llyn Eigiau lies 1.6 kilometres (1 mi) to the north of Llyn Cowlyd, and its water rights were at the time owned by the Aluminium Corporation Limited.

The history of electricity production at Dolgarrog is tied up with that of Henry Joseph Jack (1869–1936), who was chairman of the North Wales Power and Traction Co. Ltd, and who had a dream of using this new power source to power the narrow gauge railways in North Wales. The NWPTC was the company behind the Portmadoc, Beddgelert and South Snowdon Railway (to later become the Welsh Highland Railway) and he became Chairman of the Festiniog Railway during July 1921, putting him in control of all the passenger carrying narrow-gauge railways of that part of North Wales. In addition to this, in 1922 he became a director of the Snowdon Mountain Railway which was also part of the Dolgarrog empire.

== Dam ==
The first dam at Llyn Cowlyd was constructed by the Conway and Colwyn Bay Joint Water Supply Board and completed in 1897. Built as an earthwork with a core of concrete and clay puddle, it was 528 feet (161m) long and impounded 4m (13 feet) of water (265 million litres).

The present dam at the north-eastern end of Llyn Cowlyd is 14m high (45 feet) consisting of a rock and earth embankment with a concrete core. A concrete and stone apron protects the dam from wave action, which comes from the direction of the prevailing winds. The dam, which was built some 274m (300 yards) downstream of the lower, earlier one, was completed in 1921, and was officially opened on 20 September 1922.

During construction of Cowlyd dam, electricity for the winches was provided by the North Wales Power and Traction Co. Ltd's power station at Cwm Dyli, near Snowdon. The remains of the pole route along the western shore of the lake can be seen today.

Stone for the dam came from an adjacent quarry, some 400 metres (440 yd) to the north of the dam site. A short incline was constructed for transfer of stone, and it ran directly from the quarry down to the dam. Remains today suggest that this was poorly constructed, but its line is easily followed, and is clearly evident from, for instance, the summit of Creigiau Gleision. A later vehicle route also winds from the dam to the quarry. Remains of the winding drum can still be seen.

Construction workers lived in wooden barracks, a number of which afterwards found their way back to the Trefriw and Dolgarrog area to be converted into homes, and are still lived in.

=== Llyn Cowlyd Tramway ===
Construction of the dam was assisted by the construction of a narrow gauge 2 ft (610 mm) gauge railway line, known as the Llyn Cowlyd Tramway, which was used to convey men and materials to the reservoir for construction and subsequent maintenance purposes. The line ran from near Coedty reservoir, above Dolgarrog, up as far as the dam. This tramway was essentially a branch line of the Eigiau Reservoir Tramway, laid to aid construction of the dam at nearby Llyn Eigiau.

=== Failure of the dam ===
During a storm on 31 December 1924, there was a partial failure of the dam when the downstream side was washed out. The damage was kept fairly secret, and rebuilding it provided more useful work for the tramway.

This partial dam failure of the Cowlyd Dam should not be confused with that of the Dolgarrog Disaster of 1925, when the failure of the Eigiau Dam released water which went on to overtop the Coedty Dam, above Dolgarrog. This second dam also failed, releasing the huge volume of water that flooded Dolgarrog, killing 16 people.

== Fishing ==
Fly fishing (by permit) is permitted in the lake, which contains brown trout and Arctic char, originally taken from Llyn Peris, in Llanberis, when that lake was drained as part of the construction of Dinorwig Power Station.

== Myths and fables ==
According to the Mabinogion, the most ancient of Celtic literature written in the 14th century in the Red Book of Hergest, but orally dating back much further, the area was inhabited by more wildlife than seems to be there today. In one of the oldest stories, namely Culhwch and Olwen, Culhwch is obliged to perform some difficult labours, as set by the giant Ysbaddaden in order to win the hand of his daughter Olwen in marriage. In a smart move, Culhwch recruits King Arthur, his first cousin. One of the tasks is to find the lost Mabon, son of Modron, and a number of mythical beasts are consulted, one of whom is the Owl of Cwm Cowlyd. The owl narrates the history of its Cwm, and if any of it is to be believed, it confirms that the valley was once wooded (as was most of Snowdonia), but that the first clearing took place much earlier than mediaeval times, which is more unusual.

The following extract is taken from the Mabinogion:

So they proceeded to the place where was the Owl of Cwm Cawlwyd.

"Owl of Cwm Cawlwyd, here is an embassy from Arthur; knowest thou aught of Mabon the son of Modron, who was taken after three nights from his mother?"

"If I knew I would tell you. When first I came hither, the wide valley you see was a wooded glen. And a race of men came and rooted it up. And there grew there a second wood; and this wood is the third. My wings, are they not withered stumps? Yet all this time, even until to-day, I have never heard of the man for whom you inquire. Nevertheless, I will be the guide of Arthur's embassy until you come to the place where is the oldest animal in this world, and the one that has travelled most, the Eagle of Gwern Abwy."

Gwrhyr said, "Eagle of Gwern Abwy, we have come to thee an embassy from Arthur, to ask thee if thou knowest aught of Mabon the son of Modron, who was taken from his mother when he was three nights old."

The Eagle said, "I have been here for a great space of time, and when I first came hither there was a rock here, from the top of which I pecked at the stars every evening; and now it is not so much as a span high. From that day to this I have been here, and I have never heard of the man for whom you inquire, except once when I went in search of food as far as Llyn Llyw. And when I came there, I struck my talons into a salmon, thinking he would serve me as food for a long time. But he drew me into the deep, and I was scarcely able to escape from him. After that I went with my whole kindred to attack him, and to try to destroy him, but he sent messengers, and made peace with me; and came and besought me to take fifty fish spears out of his back. Unless he know something of him whom you seek, I cannot tell who may. However, I will guide you to the place where he is."

Another myth is that of the water bull who appears from the depths with "fiery horns and hoofs with flames issuing out of its nostrils". Other tales talk of solitary walkers who have been dragged to their death, and of fairies, namely the Welsh Tylwyth Teg.

== Poetry ==
The poet R. S. Thomas makes reference to the Mabinogion's Owl of Llyn Cowlyd in his poem "The Ancients of the World".

The Ancients of the World

The salmon lying in the depths of Llyn Llifon
Secretly as a thought in a dark mind,
Is not so old as the owl of Cwm Cowlyd
Who tells her sorrow nightly on the wind.

The ousel singing in the woods of Cilgwri,
Tirelessly as a stream over the mossed stones,
Is not so old as the toad of Cors Fochno
Who feels the cold skin sagging round his bones.

The toad and the ousel and the stag of Rhedynfre,
That has cropped each leaf from the tree of life,
Are not so old as the owl of Cwm Cowlyd,
That the proud eagle would have to wife.

Gwilym Cowlyd (1828–1904), whose real name was William John Roberts, was a native of Trefriw, and one of the more colourful figures in Welsh culture and the Welsh Eisteddfod. His bardic name was taken from neighbouring Llyn Cowlyd.
