= Afon Porth-llwyd =

River in Snowdonia in north-west Wales

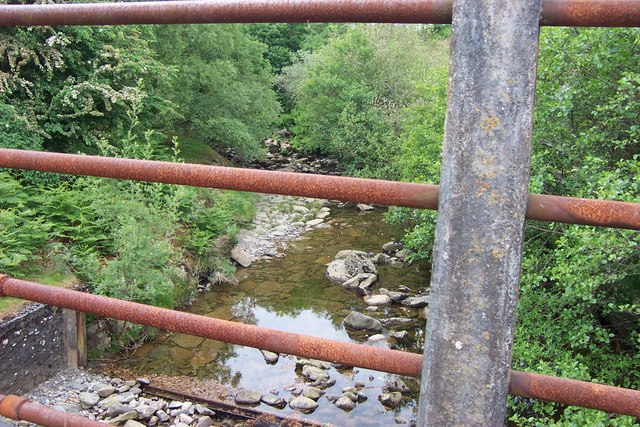

- Location of the mouth in Wales

Location
- Country: Wales
- District: Conwy

Physical characteristics
- Source: Llyn Eigau
- Mouth: Confluence with Afon Conwy
  - coordinates: 53°11′42″N 3°50′06″W

Afon Porth-llwyd is a river in Snowdonia in north-west Wales. It flows from Llyn Eigiau on the south-eastern edge of the Carneddau range to join the river Conwy.

Its waters are trapped at Coedty reservoir before flowing down to pass under Pont Newydd in Dolgarrog. From Coedty reservoir some water is also diverted to Dolgarrog Power station (along with water from Llyn Cowlyd) via large black pipes.
