= Creigiau Gleision North Top =

Mountain in Conwy County Borough, Wales

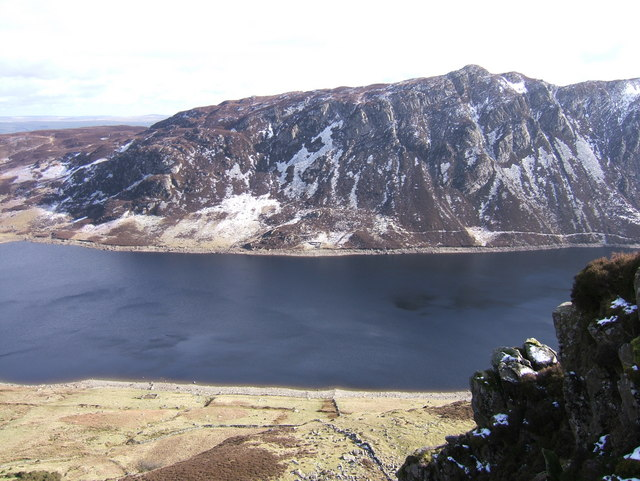
- Creigiau Gleision North Top from Pen Llithrig y Wrach north ridge.

Highest point
- Elevation: 632 m (2,073 ft)
- Prominence: 36 m (118 ft)
- Parent peak: Creigiau Gleision
- Listing: Hewitt, Nuttall
- Coordinates: 53.1424°N 3.8947°W

Naming
- English translation: grey-green rocks
- Language of name: Welsh
- Pronunciation: Welsh: [ˈkreiɡiai ˈɡleiʃion]

Geography
- Location: Conwy, Wales
- Parent range: Snowdonia
- OS grid: SH733622
- Topo map: OS Explorer OL 17

Creigiau Gleision North Top is a mountain in Snowdonia, Wales, near Capel Curig. It is a significant top on the Creigiau Gleision ridge, topping the north end of its crest. Views of Carnedd Llewelyn are better from this summit compared to the main Creigiau Gleision summit, due to less shielding from Pen Llithrig y Wrach.
