= Cefn Cyfarwydd =

Hill in Conwy County Borough, Wales

Coordinates: 53.1474°N 3.8729°W

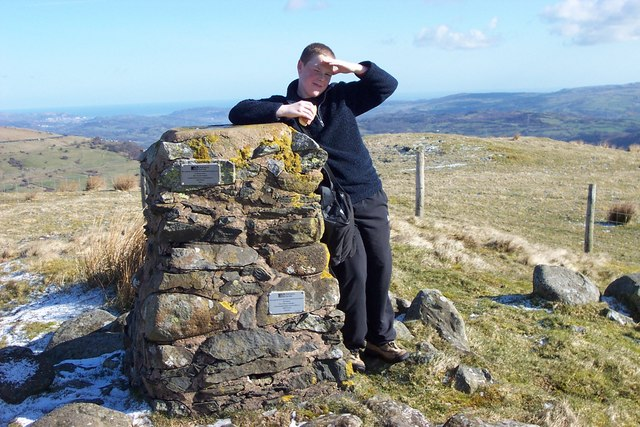
The trig point on Cefn Cyfarwydd, above Trefriw.

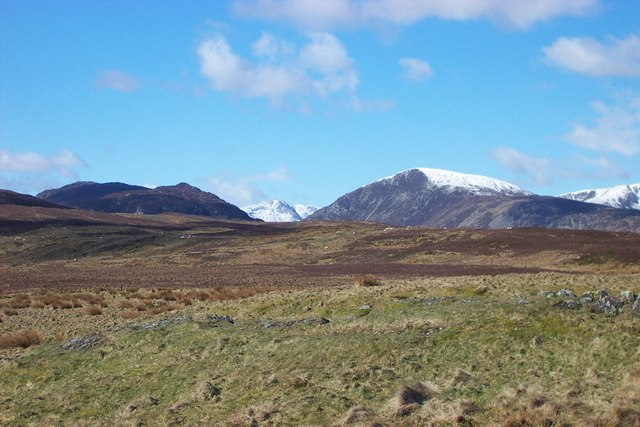
View WSW along the ridge from the trig point, showing Creigiau Gleision (left) and Pen Llithrig y Wrach (right).

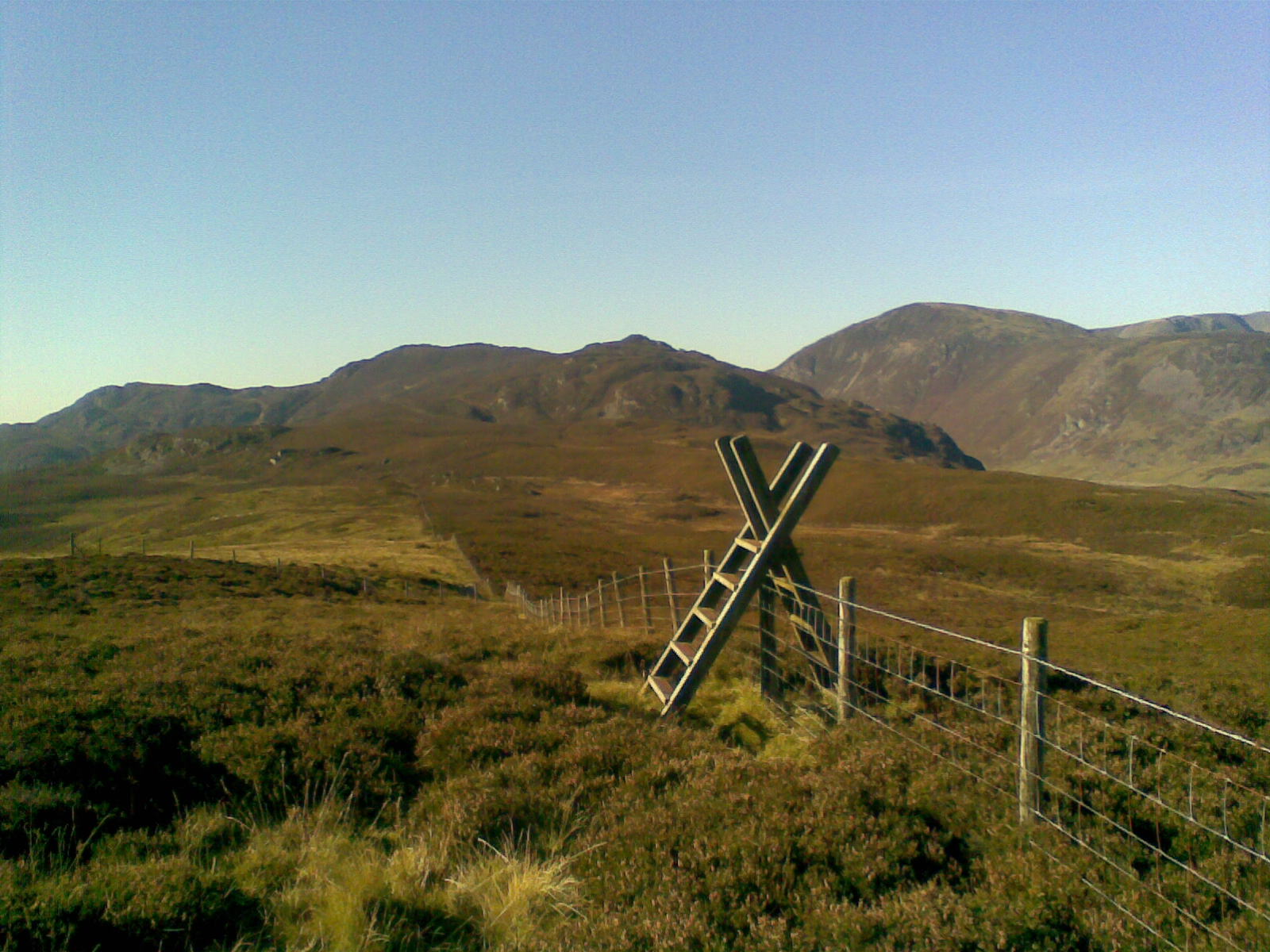
Looking along the ridge towards Pen y Graig Gron and Creigiau Gleision. The presence of a style is not necessarily an indication of a good path!

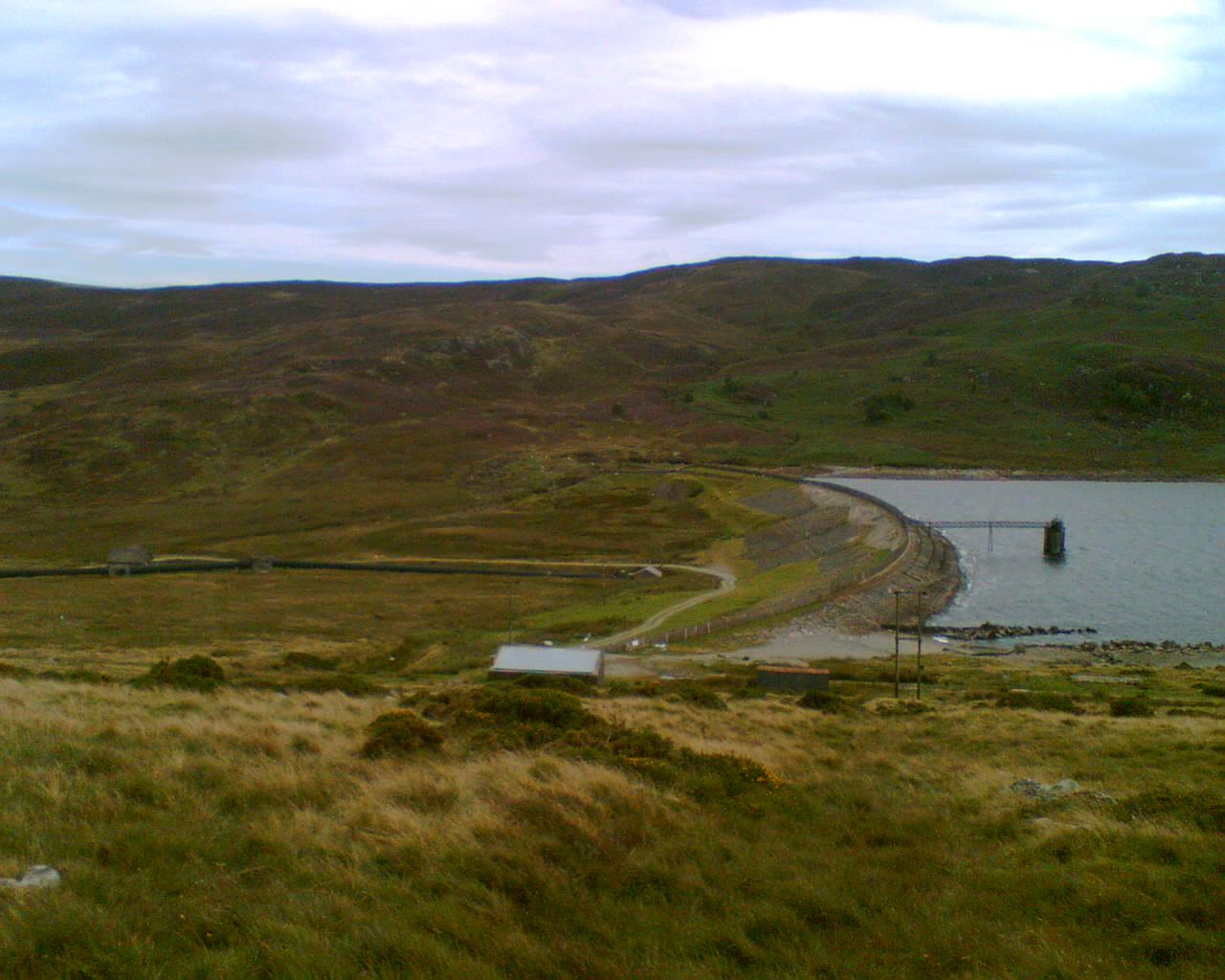
Looking SE - Llyn Cowlyd dam, with Cefn Cyfarwydd behind.

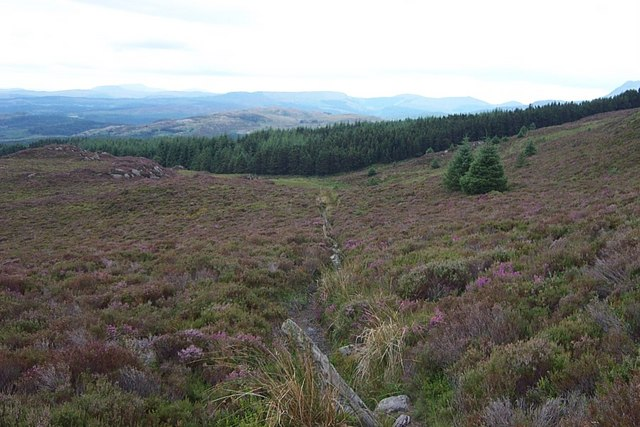
Moorland near Pen y Graig Gron, above the tree-line of the forested slopes.

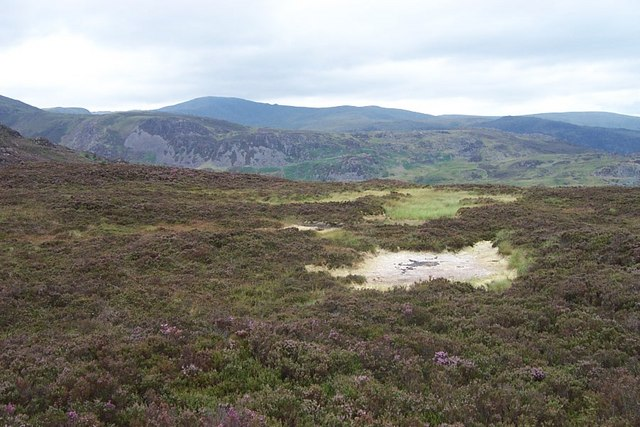
Pools on the moorland near Pen y Graig Gron.

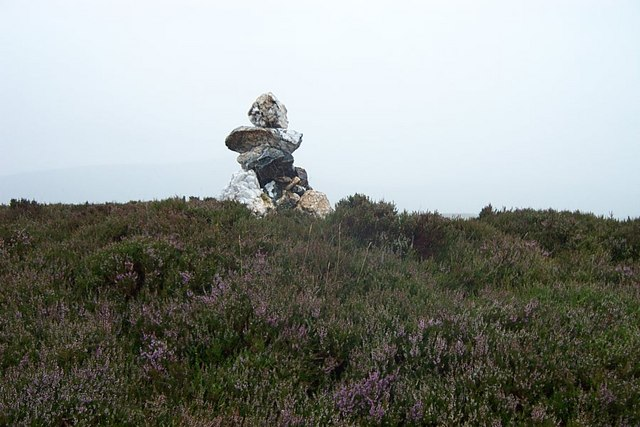
A re-arranged cairn on Cefn Cyfarwydd.

Cefn Cyfarwydd is a ridge in Conwy county borough, north Wales. It is located above the village of Trefriw on the western side of the Conwy valley, and dramatically separates Cwm Cowlyd and the rugged mountains of the Carneddau from the greener, lusher Conwy valley.

The Welsh word cyfarwydd can mean either "familiar" (adj.) or "a story-teller, guide or expert" (noun). Cefn means "ridge".
'Cefn Cyfarwydd' therefore translates as either "familiar ridge" or "story-teller's ridge".

== Extent ==
The ridge reaches some 500m in height, and covers an area of some 8 square kilometres, broadly 4 km long by 2 km wide. It runs in a largely SW - NE direction, and is relatively flat-topped, resulting in some wet pools and boggy patches, even in the summer months. Much of it is heathery moorland.

To the north-west it slopes down steeply to Llyn Cowlyd, and to the south-east to Llyn Crafnant and the Crafnant valley where, in places, these slopes have been forested. The south-eastern slope of the ridge is steeper than the north-western slope.

The north-eastern end of the ridge drops into the Conwy valley between Trefriw and Dolgarrog, whilst to the south-west it runs on to become Pen y Graig Gron ("top/end of the round stone"), then rises to the ridge of Creigiau Gleision ("blue-green rocks") (over 600m in height) and the Crimpiau. For much of its length it affords splendid views in all directions.

== Height ==
There is a trig point (triangulation pillar TP2074) recording a height of 419 m (1375 ft) at location SH7641664273. This can be easily viewed from Ffordd Cowlyd, the lane from Trefriw to Llyn Cowlyd, which crosses Cefn Cyfarwydd towards its northern end.

The trig point is, however, not at the highest point of the ridge. The highest point actually lies some mile to the south-west, where a cairn has been placed at a height of 503 m (1650 ft). This is just a little north of the remains of Lledwigan burial cairn, which probably dates to the Bronze Age.

== Access ==
The top of the ridge is remote and wild, in direct contrast to the Conwy valley to the east. Whilst remote, it can be accessed by a number of rights of way -

- from the southern end of Llyn Crafnant (on the path to Capel Curig) via the Crimpiau
- from the southern end of Llyn Crafnant, via the forested slopes
- from halfway down the Crafnant valley, skirting Lledwigan Farm
- from Ffordd Cowlyd (the road from Trefriw) which crosses its northern end, near to the triangulation point (at 419m)
- from Llyn Cowlyd dam up to the top of the ridge
- from Capel Curig, via The Crimpiau or Creigiau Gleision

Whilst it is possible to traverse the entire length of the ridge, the north-eastern half is lacking in good paths through the heather, gorse and bilberry, and boggy patches abound. Sheep tracks criss-cross in all directions, and some are used by farmers' quad bikes which makes them the best option, but they are hard to find, even in good conditions. It is easier to find a good path when traversing from south to north (i.e. towards the Trefriw road), as paths can be seen when looking down from above.

== Old settlement ==
The ridge contains the evidence of many remains of old settlement. The Royal Commission on the Ancient and Historical Monuments of Wales reports that a survey in 1993-4 added around 600 sites to the 2 already recorded on the Sites and Monuments Record. According to this record, the earliest evidence of activity was 4 cairns, probably dating back to the Bronze Age, and there was a round hut with adjoining sub-rectangular structures suggesting late prehistoric settlement. Many remains indicated mediaeval occupation, but these were not on the exposed top of the ridge, but generally between the 250m and 350m contours, where the soil was better and there was more shelter.

Most of the later sites have agricultural connections, and in some places traces of earlier field patterns survive. The most substantial remains today are derelict farmhouses, and even two derelict chapels.

It is possible that some of the buildings on the edges of the marginal land may be hafotai (summer dwellings) rather than permanent dwellings.

== Industry ==
The ridge also shows evidence of peat cutting, and there are the remains of several mine trials and small-scale quarrying, such as what is known today as Cefn Cyfarwydd slate mine.

== Changing view ==
The view from Cefn Cyfarwydd has always changed, from the construction of Cowlyd Dam, to the pylons which have appeared further down the Conwy Valley, and as the town of Llanrwst has grown. The 21st century has seen the development of 12 turbines at the Moel Maelogan wind farm on the other side of the Conwy Valley, and very visible from this ridge.
