= Coed Dolgarrog National Nature Reserve =

Nature reserve in Conwy, Wales

Coordinates: 53.185°N 3.841°W

Coed Dolgarrog National Nature Reserve is a nature reserve which covers the steep western side of the Conwy Valley, outside the village of Dolgarrog, around 10 kilometres south of Conwy and 6.5 kilometres north of Llanrwst in Conwy County Borough, Wales.

== Wildlife ==
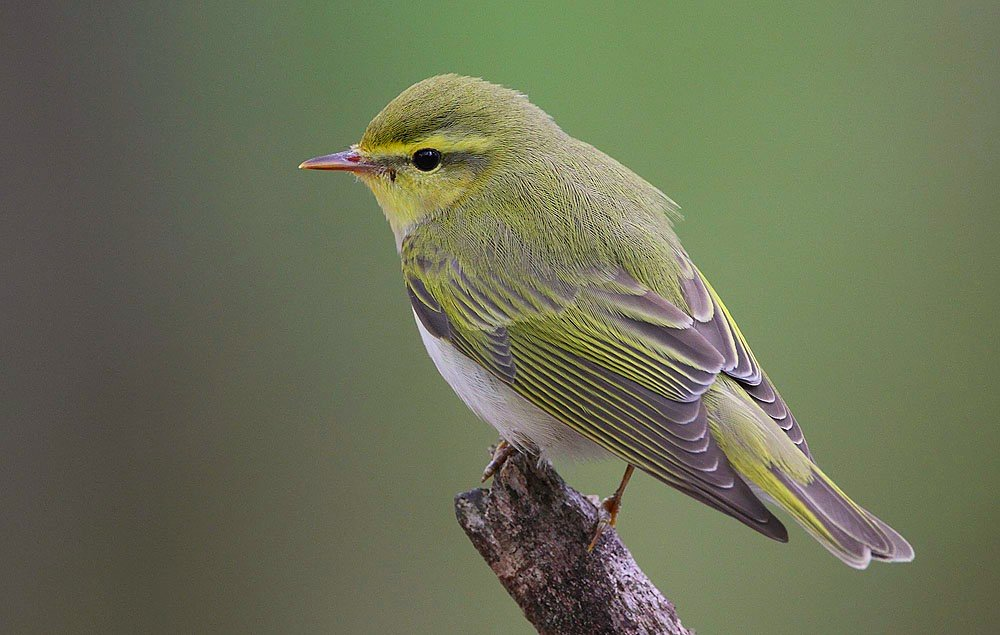
Wood Warbler

The woodland is made up of two distinct areas, mature Beech trees and wet Alder woodland, both rare in North Wales. There are many old and mature trees, and old coppice areas. There is a wide variety of wildlife throughout the seasons, including early purple orchids, Town Hall Clock, bird's nest orchid, wood warbler, pied-flycatcher, common redstart, damselflies and dragonflies. In the autumn a wide variety of fungi like chanterelles can be seen.

== Geography ==
Two huge volcanic cliffs loom amidst its wooded slopes, where lime trees can be found benefitting from the rock's richness and low acidity. The reserve is the largest oak woodland growing on this type of base in North Wales, and is important for some of Snowdonia’s specialities, such as arctic and alpine plants.
