= Creigiau Gleision =

Mountain in Conwy County Borough, Wales

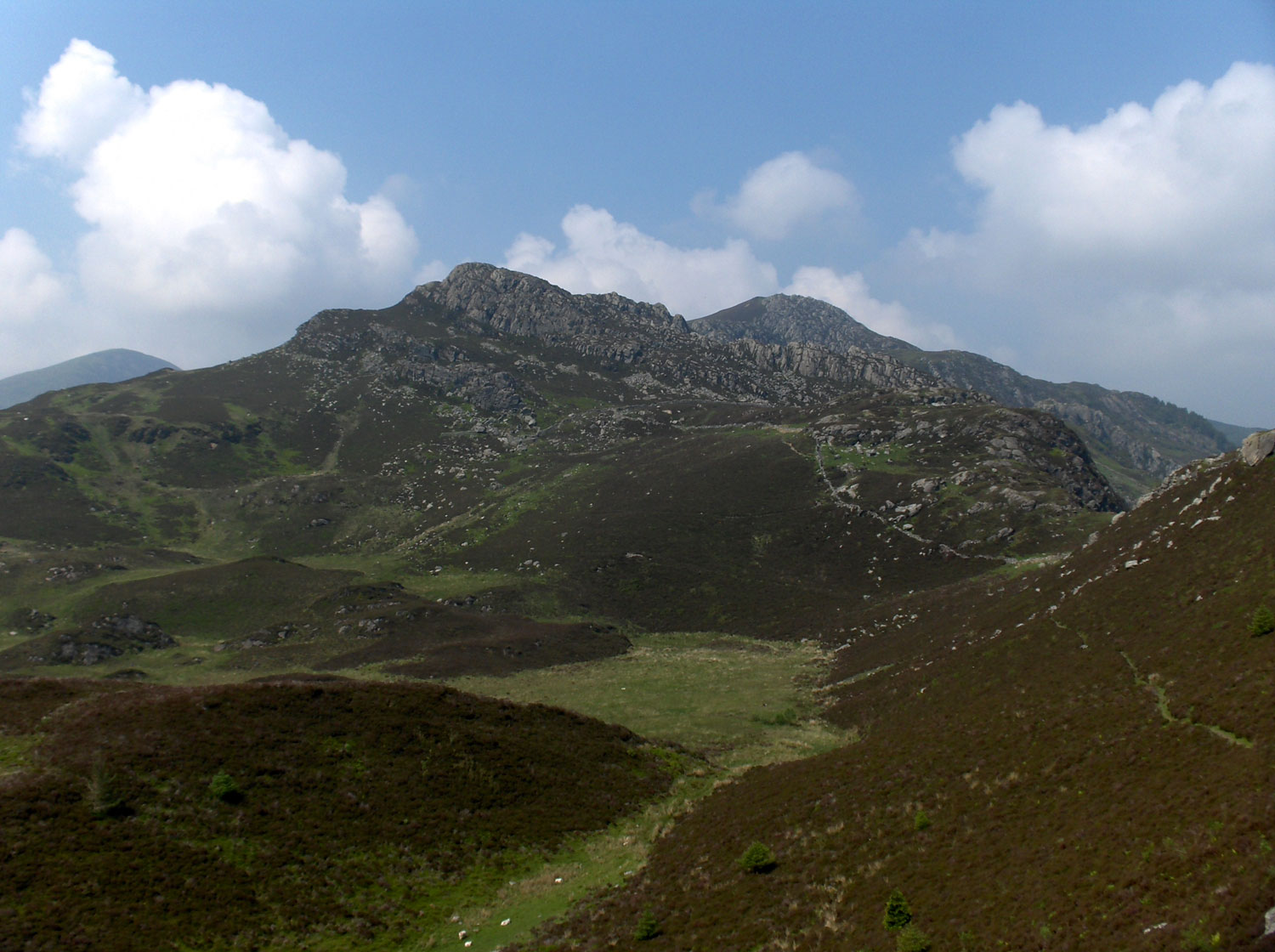
- Creigiau Gleision from the south

Highest point
- Elevation: 676 m (2,218 ft)
- Prominence: 261 m (856 ft)
- Parent peak: Carnedd Llewelyn
- Listing: Marilyn, Hewitt, Nuttall
- Coordinates: 53.1359°N 3.9014°W

Naming
- English translation: grey-green rocks
- Language of name: Welsh
- Pronunciation: Welsh: [ˈkrei̯ɡjai ˈɡlei̯ʃon]

Geography
- Location: Conwy, Wales
- Parent range: Snowdonia
- OS grid: SH729615
- Topo map: OS Explorer OL 17

Listed summits of Creigiau Gleision
Name	Grid ref	Height	Status
Creigiau Gleision North Top	SH733622	632 m (2,080 ft)	Hewitt, Nuttall
Craiglwyn	SH730608	623 m (2,044 ft)	sub Hewitt, Nuttall

Creigiau Gleision is a mountain in Snowdonia, Wales, near Capel Curig. It is the easternmost of the high Carneddau and is separated from the others by Llyn Cowlyd. Directly across this reservoir from Creigiau Gleision is Pen Llithrig y Wrach. To the north-east it runs into the broad ridge of Cefn Cyfarwydd.

Creigiau Gleision affords splendid views in all directions, including northwards to the coast, and down the Ogwen Valley and Dyffryn Mymbyr towards Snowdon.

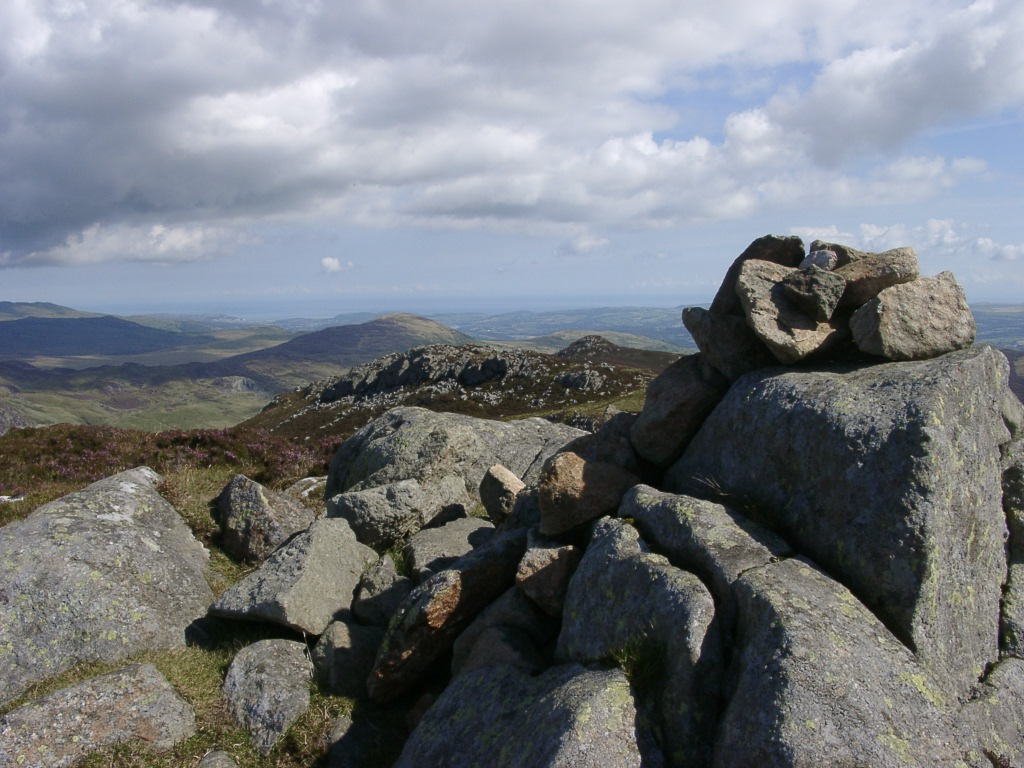
View of the 3 peaks - looking north from the highest peak.

In fact the mountain has three peaks, hence perhaps its plural name. The most southerly peak is the highest, at 676 metres (2,218 ft), and the O.S. map also marks the northerly peak (some ½ mile distant) at 632 metres (2,073 ft). Between these two lie a middle peak, of a height between the outer two, but cairnless and unmarked on the O.S. map.

Colin Adams, author of The Mountain Walker's Guide to Wales (Gwasg Carreg Gwalch, 2002), has reached the summit of Creigiau Gleision over 450 times. He claims that on many occasions he encountered a ghost there who has spoken to him, and although he makes no reference to this in his book, he wrote about it in 1999.
