= Afon Eigiau =

River in north-west wales

Coordinates: 53.16226°N 3.91328°W

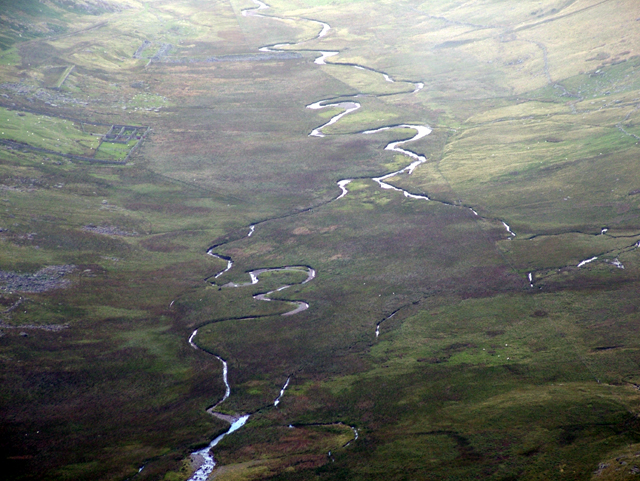
Afon Eigiau flowing through Cwm Eigiau. Former slate workings are evident on the left.

Afon Eigiau is a small river in the Carneddau mountains in Snowdonia, in north-west Wales, which flows down Cwm Eigiau and into Llyn Eigiau.

It is fed by smaller streams which flow down the slopes of neighbouring Foel Grach, Carnedd Llywelyn and Pen yr Helgi Du.

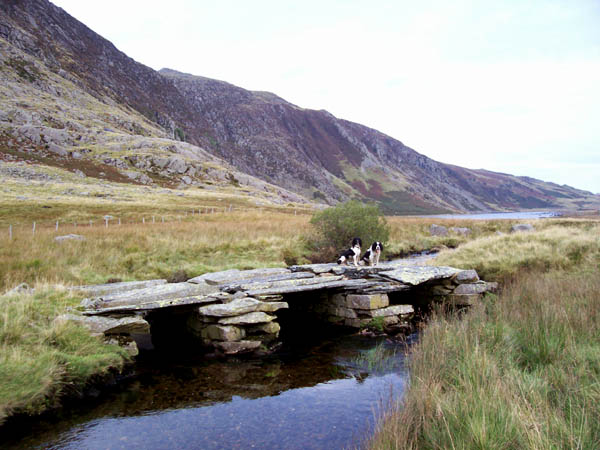
An old bridge on the Afon Eigiau.
