= Llyn Eigiau =

Reservoir in Snowdonia, Conwy, Wales

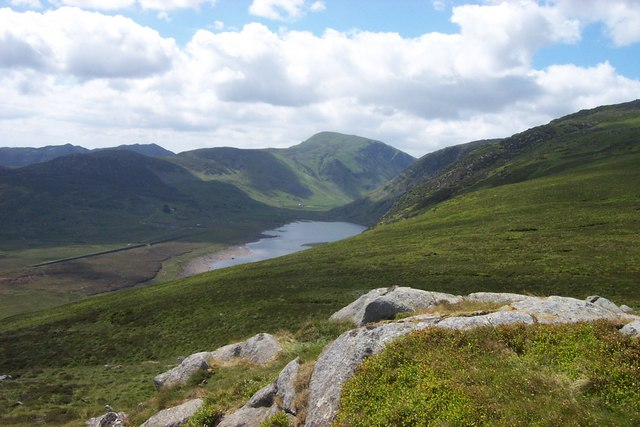
- from the summit of Clogwynyreryr

- Location within Gwynedd
- Location: Snowdonia, Gwynedd, Wales
- Coordinates: 53°10′8″N 3°54′57″W
- Type: natural, reservoir
- Primary inflows: Afon Eigiau
- Primary outflows: Afon Porth-llwyd
- Basin countries: United Kingdom
- Surface area: 120 acres (49 ha)
- Max. depth: 32 ft (9.8 m)

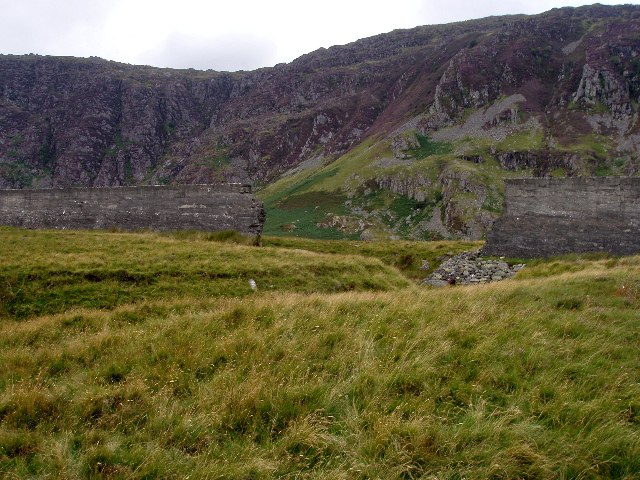
The breach in the dam, showing the gully cut by floodwater.

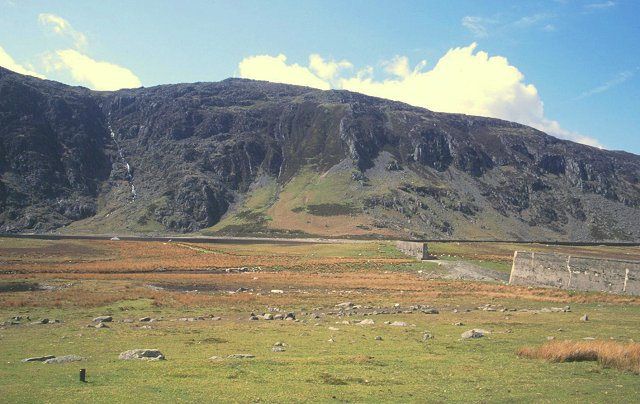
A second breach was deliberately made in the dam to prevent a re-occurrence.

Llyn Eigiau is a lake on the edge of the Carneddau range of mountains in Snowdonia, Conwy, Wales. The name Eigiau is thought to refer to the shoals of fish which once lived here. Early maps refer to it as Llynyga. It is thought that a small number of Arctic char exist in the lake (as they do in neighbouring Llyn Cowlyd) after they were transferred here from Llyn Peris, and certainly it is one of the few lakes in Wales to have its own natural brown trout. The lake is surrounded by mountains including Pen Llithrig y Wrach.

== Dam ==
In 1911 a dam ¾ mile long and 35-foot (11 m) high was built across part of its eastern side to supply water for the power station at Dolgarrog, which in turn provided power for the adjacent aluminium works. Materials for the dam were transported along the newly laid Eigiau Tramway, which ran from Dolgarrog and utilized the route of the former Cedryn Quarry Tramway. The original contractor pulled out of the construction, alleging corner-cutting, and indeed on 2 November 1925, following 26 inches (660 mm) of rain in just five days, the dam broke. The water flowed down to Coedty Reservoir, also causing that to burst, and millions of gallons of water flowed down into the village of Dolgarrog, causing the loss of 16 lives. A new power station was built at Dolgarrog in 1925. Three short black and white silent films of the incident exist. A study of the dam today shows that the foundations were insufficient, and large lumps of unmixed cement can also be seen. The dam material that can be seen through existing holes is flaky and tends to break away easily.

== Present-day ==
Today the lake covers an area of about 120 acres (0.49 km^{2}), and has a depth of about 32-foot (9.8 m). After the construction of the dam its area would have been twice this.

Water is fed into Llyn Eigiau by a tunnel from the stream below Llyn Dulyn, and another larger tunnel takes water from Llyn Eigiau to Llyn Cowlyd. The main feeder of Llyn Eigiau is Afon Eigiau, a small river which flows down Cwm Eigiau. The outflow from Llyn Eigiau is called Afon Porth-llwyd, and this flows via Coedty reservoir before passing under Pont Newydd in Dolgarrog. This then flows into the River Conwy.

== Access ==
Although private vehicles are not permitted access to the lake itself, there is a carpark within walking distance, approx. half a mile from the dam and which is reached by road from the B5106 at Tal-y-bont, in the Conwy valley. The road passes through Llanbedr-y-Cennin and thereafter becomes a narrow lane as it goes over the hills towards the lake. Along this lane there are some public footpaths signposted, with stiles to access them over the old dry-stone walls that run along parts of the lane.

== Bibliography ==
- Jones, Jonah (1987). The Lakes of North Wales. Whittet Books Ltd.
- Roberts, Geraint (1985). The Lakes of Eryri. Gwasg Carreg Gwalch.
