= Moel Eilio (Carneddau) =

Hill in the Carneddau, Wales, England

Coordinates: 53.1753°N 3.8755°W

Highest point
- Elevation: 546 m (1,791 ft)
- Prominence: 93 m (305 ft)
- Parent peak: Carnedd Llywelyn
- Listing: Sub HuMP

Naming
- English translation: Eilio`s Hill

Geography
- Parent range: Carneddau
- OS grid: SH747659

Moel Eilio (not to be confused with Moel Eilio near Snowdon), is a 546-metre (1,791 ft) hill in the eastern Carneddau of northern Wales. It looks very prominent on the approach from the north towards Llanrwst along the Conwy Valley.
