= Dolgarrog =

Village and community in Conwy County Borough, Wales

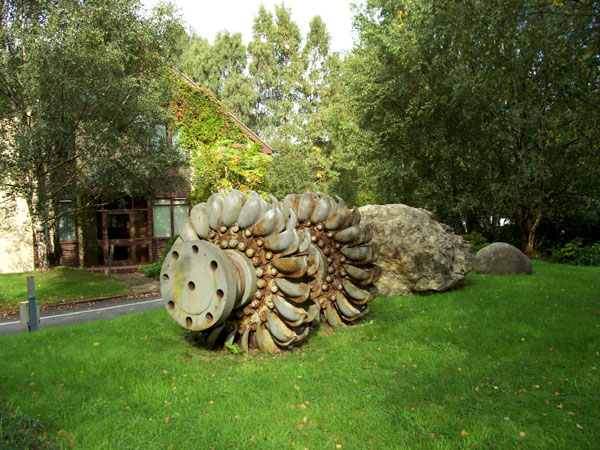
- A pair of Pelton wheels in the grounds of Dolgarrog Power Station

- Location within Conwy
- Population: 446 (2011)
- OS grid reference: SH768676
- Community: Dolgarrog
- Principal area: Conwy
- Preserved county: Clwyd
- Country: Wales
- Sovereign state: United Kingdom
- Post town: CONWY
- Postcode district: LL32
- Dialling code: 01492
- Police: North Wales
- Fire: North Wales
- Ambulance: Welsh
- UK Parliament: Bangor Aberconwy
- Senedd Cymru – Welsh Parliament: Aberconwy
- List of places UK Wales Conwy 53.191°N 3.844°W Map of the community

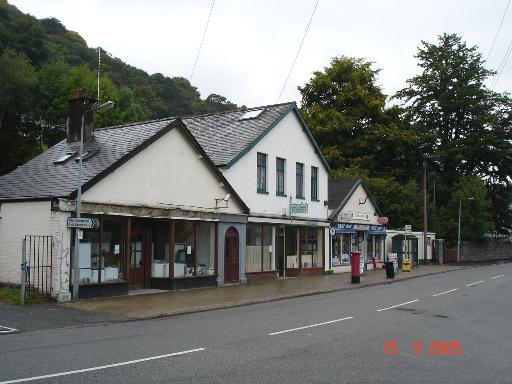
The shops at Dolgarrog

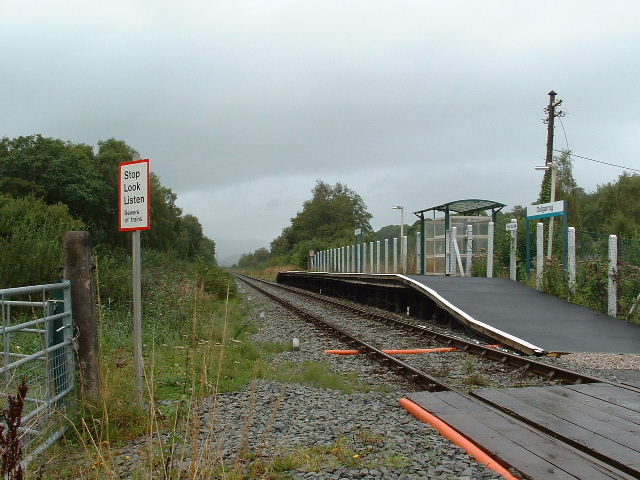
Dolgarrog Halt, on the Conwy Valley line, located across the river

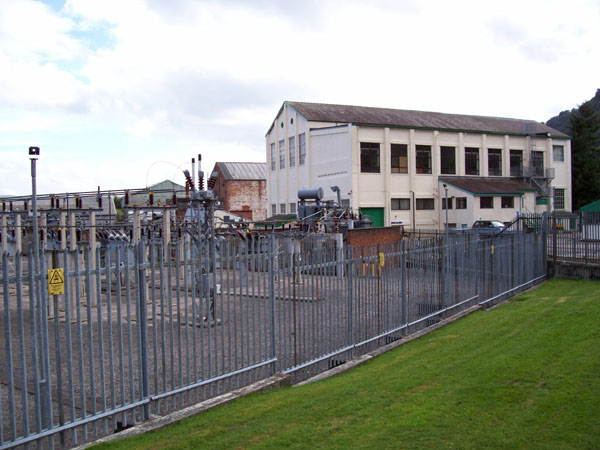
Dolgarrog power station, located next to the Aluminium Works

The incline up to the Eigiau Tramway, adjacent to the pipeline

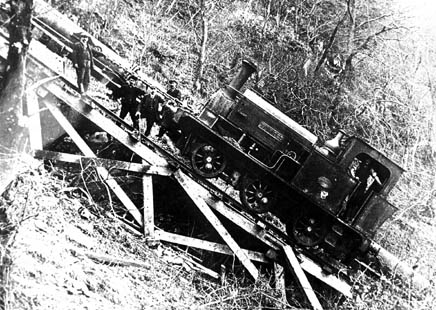
An engine being taken up the Dolgarrog incline to the Eigiau Tramway. Some of this timberwork still exists today.

A slate plaque marking the beginning of the memorial walk

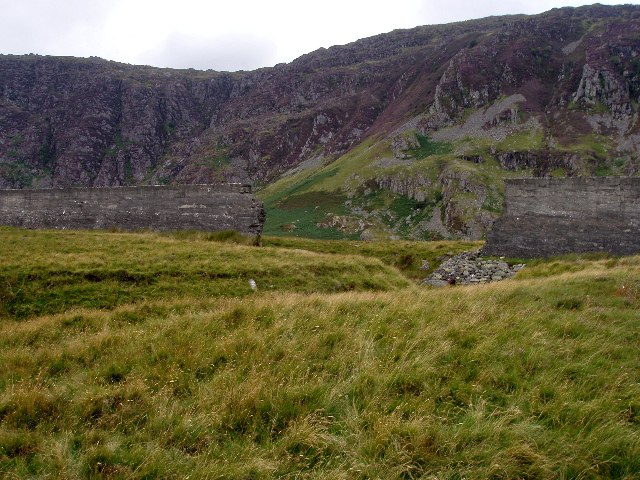
The breach in Llyn Eigiau dam, showing the gully cut by flood water. (A second, different breach was later deliberately made in the main wall to prevent it happening again.)

Dolgarrog is a village and community in Conwy County Borough, in Wales, situated between Llanrwst and Conwy, very close to the Conwy River. The village is well known for its industrial history since the 18th century and the 1925 Eigiau dam disaster. The population was 414 at the 2001 Census, increasing to 446 at the 2011 Census. The community extends up to, and includes part of, Llyn Cowlyd in the Carneddau.

The village is served by Dolgarrog railway station, a halt on the other side of the river Conwy, The bridge allowing access to the station was slated for closure in 2021 due to it being structurally unsafe, but reopened after repairs in 2023.

Surf Snowdonia, the world's first commercial artificial surfing lake, operated in Dolgarrog on the site of the old aluminium factory between 2015 and 2023.

Across the valley is the crag of Cadair Ifan Goch.

== Etymology ==
The name Dolgarrog derives from Welsh dôl (water-meadow) and carrog (torrent) and reflects the fact that a number of streams descend steeply to the flatter ground beside the river Conwy in this locality. Earlier forms are of the form 'Dole y Garrog' with an intervening 'y (the).

=== The Legend of Y Garrog ===
In a folk etymology, Dolgarrog is said to have got its name from a flying dragon called Y Garrog. This mythical beast preyed on livestock and Dolgarrog (The Garrog's meadow) was the favourite meadow on which it swooped down from the heights to carry off sheep. So serious were the losses that the farmers went on a hunt armed with bows, arrows and spears. One farmer, Nico Ifan, refused to go, claiming a dream had forewarned him that the Garrog would cause his death. His fellow farmers laid a poisoned sheep's carcass on the heights above Eglwysbach across the river. The unsuspecting Garrog seized the bait, was caught and beaten to death. Nico Ifan then came along to gloat over the dead dragon and cursed and kicked the corpse, whereupon the poisoned barbed wing of the Garrog pierced his leg – thus fulfilling the death warning in his dream.

== History ==
It is believed to have been established around 1200 AD.

=== The Black Death ===
In the 1350s the Black Death took a heavy toll in the lower Conwy Valley, particularly among the bond tenants regulated by the King's officers from Aberconwy, Edward I's new English borough. Their visits and contacts in effect spread the disease. Some townships of villeins, or crown tenants, such as Dolgarrog, were swept away. People left their lands or hid, unable to pay the taxes on their holdings.

=== The Gunpowder Plot ===
A man privy to Guy Fawkes' Gunpowder Plot is said to have lived in the house Ardda'r Myneich (Monks Hill), whose ruins lie in the fields above the road between Porthllwyd and Dolgarrog bridges. Dr Thomas Williams (1550–1622), rector of St Peter's Church, Llanbedr-y-Cennin, was charged with having papist sympathies. He had warned Sir John Wynn of Gwydir to stay away from the Houses of Parliament on that fateful day.

=== Industry ===
Dolgarrog's industrialisation began in the 18th century with a flour mill on the Porth Llwyd river to crush corn for local farmers. There was also a woollen mill at Dolgarrog bridge and the Abbey mill.

The successful Porthllwyd mill was expanded by John Lloyd, son of founder Richard Lloyd. As well as grinding flour, he bought machines to make paper and flock for bedding. Paper from Porthllwyd supplied local printers, including John Jones, printer of Trefriw and later Llanrwst.

In 1885 the villagers wanted to start a school at Porthllwyd. The old village of Dolgarrog appealed to Mr Robins, the then proprietor of the paper-mill. He let them turn a large empty room at the mill into a flourishing Sunday School, known locally as Ystafell y drws goch ("the room with the red door") to make sure the children did not wander into the mill workings.

The Dolgarrog sawmill of John Williams also flourished. It exported hundreds of tons of wooden railway sleepers for the new railways between 1845 and 1865. When the first sod was cut for the Conway and Llanrwst Railway track on 25 August 1860, on Lord Newborough's land at Abbey, Dolgarrog, it was John Williams who supplied the sleepers.

=== The aluminium works ===
The aluminium works (or "smelter") was originally planned in 1895. Water from reservoirs in the Snowdonia Mountains would provide the hydro-electricity needed to run the mill.

In 1907 aluminium reduction ("aluminium smelting") began in the factory utilising electricity from the distant Cwm Dyli power station, and in 1916 a rolling mill was added. In 1924 a hydro-electric plant was built next to the aluminium works to assist in the running of the mill.

During the Second World War the aluminium works were under the control of the Ministry of Aircraft Production and provided parts for aircraft. There was an anti-aircraft unit stationed there, local houses painted green and pill boxes constructed. It is rumoured that the Luftwaffe tried to destroy the works, but the bomber that was sent was shot down, crash-landing in the mountains above the village.

Under the management of Henry Joseph Jack, the Aluminium Corporation of Dolgarrog acquired a controlling interest in the North Wales Power & Traction Company in 1918. This company had been established by Act of Parliament in 1904, taking over the powers awarded to the Portmadoc, Beddgelert & South Snowdon Railway to build a hydro-electric power station in Nant Gwynant for railway purposes, as well as a 2 ft gauge electric railway serving the places named in the 1901 Portmadoc, Beddgelert & South Snowdon Railway Act.

With the vision expanding to supply power to north Wales industries, the railway company was divested of its power-generating powers by another 1904 Act but remained under control of the power company; one of its assets was the 2 ft gauge horse-worked Croesor Tramway. Working with Evan Robert Davies – a Pwllheli solicitor and friend of politician David Lloyd George – and Dundee distiller Sir John Henderson Stewart Bt, Jack was a key player in the development of the Welsh Highland Railway, taking over the North Wales Narrow Gauge Railways, reconstructing part of the Croesor Tramway for steam working, linking them with a new railway around Beddgelert and connecting the whole to the Festiniog Railway at Portmadoc. The trio also acquired control of the Festiniog Railway Company and the Snowdon Mountain Tramroad & Hotels Company, running them all from Dolgarrog for a time.

Aluminium reduction ceased in 1944, following a review by the Ministry of Aircraft Production of 1943 which showed that aluminium ingot produced at Dolgarrog cost over £300 per ton compared with Canadian imports at £110 per ton. Production thereafter concentrated upon re-melted, rolled and specialist goods including patterned sheet, cookware and advanced alloys. Alcoa bought out the company Luxfer in 2000 and announced its closure in June 2002. Dolgarrog Aluminium Ltd was formed in 2002 and acquired the assets from Alcoa that year. The factory closed in late 2007 and was demolished in 2009. An artificial wave pool, Surf Snowdonia, operated on the site between August 2015 and September 2023.

=== 'Garden City' ===
Prior to the construction of the Aluminium works, Dolgarrog had little in the way of a population. Much of the housing seen today along the main street in Dolgarrog was built by the Aluminium Corporation. In May 1908 the Welsh Coast Pioneer and Review reported their intentions:

The report that the Aluminium Corporation, Ltd., contemplate erecting numerous semi-detached houses for their employees, at Dolgarrog, of the character of a "Garden City" is exciting considerable interest, and the completion of the plans of the first portion of the scheme, by Mr A. Morley Jonee, architect, Llanrwst, are looked forward to. Included in the scheme is a commodious hotel and several shops. The Corporation will employ from 400 to 500 men, and these, with their families, will dwell in the "Garden City", giving a considerable impetus to the local trades, which will naturally benefit by the undertaking.

A limited number of houses were subsequently built, and the Company did also build a hotel and a church. The Works also prompted more housebuilding in neighbouring villages; three managers, for instance, lived in Trefriw.

=== 1925 dam disaster ===
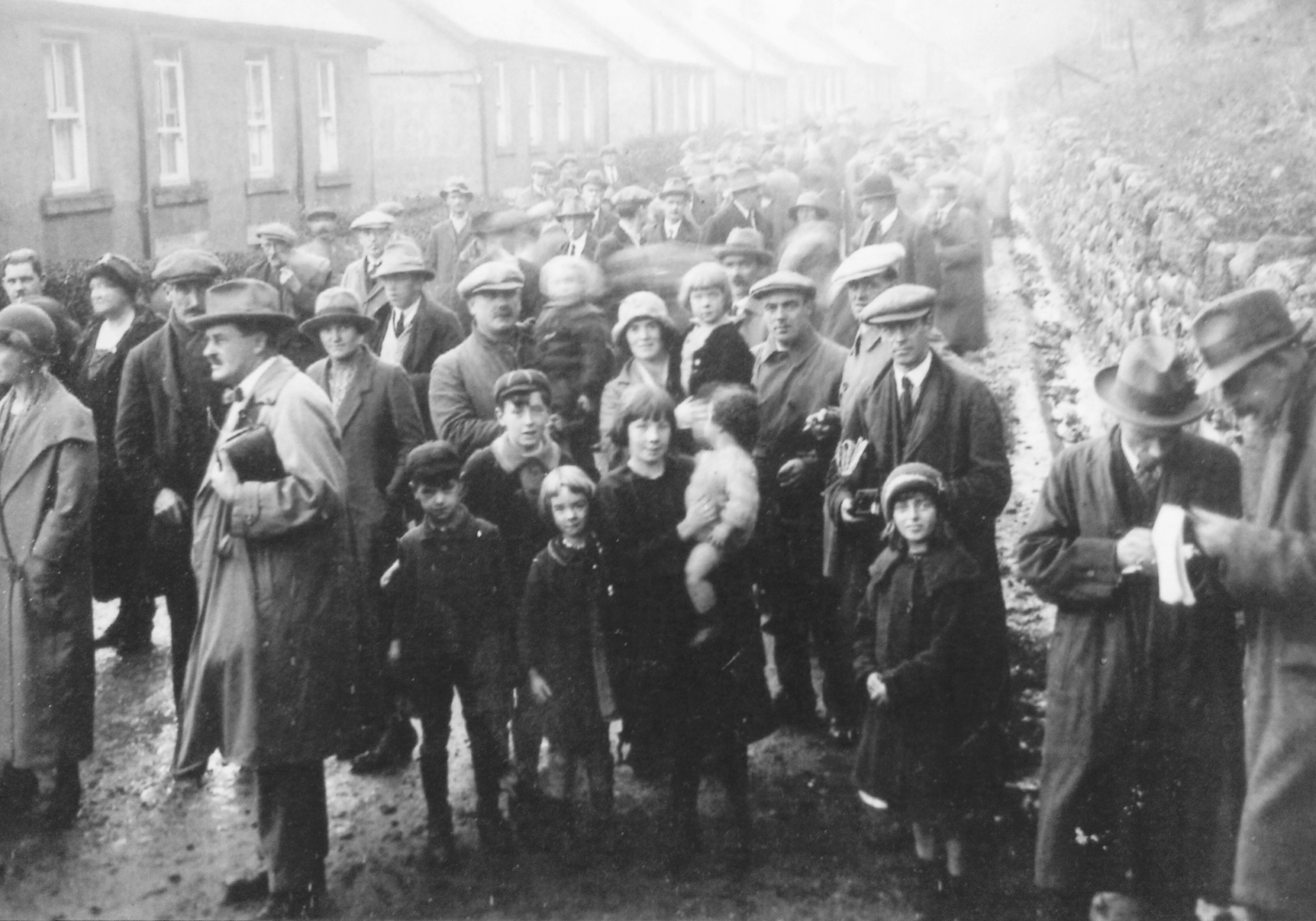
Officials, journalists and survivors on the street in the aftermath of the disaster. The man with the child in his arms, Edward Holland Roberts, was a butcher whose shop was washed away in the flood.

On 2 November 1925 the failure of two dams caused a flood that swamped the village of Dolgarrog, killing 16 people. The disaster was started by the failure of the Eigiau Dam, a gravity dam owned by the Aluminium Corporation. The water released from the reservoir flooded downstream, and overtopped the Coedty Dam, an embankment dam. This dam also subsequently failed, releasing the huge volume of water that flooded Dolgarrog. Many more villagers could have been killed had they not been in the local theatre watching a film that night.

The disaster at Dolgarrog led Parliament to pass the Reservoirs (Safety Provisions) Act 1930, which introduced laws on the safety of reservoirs. This has since been updated, and the current law is the Reservoirs Act 1975.

In 2004 a £60,000 memorial trail was created, explaining the tragic story to walkers. The trail takes visitors to where the boulders from the damaged dam reside. The project was opened by the last survivor of the dam disaster, Fred Brown, who on that night lost his mother and his younger sister.

The construction of Eigiau dam had been facilitated by the construction of the Eigiau Tramway, which largely followed the route of the Cedryn Quarry Tramway from Dolgarrog. The incline was upgraded (and the lower section re-aligned), enabling steam engines to reach the starting point of the tramway, near Coedty reservoir. The tramway was built to standard gauge, but was subsequently relaid in narrow gauge (from about 1916) when the Cowlyd Tramway was begun. This latter tramway branched off from the Eigiau tramway at the top of the Dolgarrog incline.

The line of the railway incline has today been replaced by a second pipeline, and the adjoining hillsides are wooded. However, there is a public footpath which ascends the hillside to the left of the pipeline, and in places the timberwork can still be seen. Today the pipeline in the left (when viewed from Dolgarrog) carries water from Llyn Cowlyd, the pipeline on the right carries water from Coedty reservoir.

To the south of the Health Centre the remains of a lower incline (the old route of the Cedryn Tramway) can still be seen. This incline, which joined the upper section a little above the village, passed through a short tunnel under the road at Tyddyn Isaf, visible from the main road. From here the original quarry tramway continued across the marshland to the edge of the River Conwy at Porth Llwyd wharf.

== Coed Dolgarrog National Nature Reserve ==
The Coed Dolgarrog National Nature Reserve is a wooded area consisting of Beech and Alder woodland which is rare in North Wales. The Beech area allows many different fungi to grow during the autumn.

== Education ==
Ysgol Gynradd Dyffryn yr Enfys provides Welsh-medium primary education to the village and the surrounding area. As of 2024, there were 107 pupils enrolled at the school. 32.9 per cent of statutory school age pupils come from Welsh-speaking homes.

In terms of secondary education, the village is in the catchment area of Ysgol Dyffryn Conwy in Llanrwst.

== The Lord Newborough ==
Built during the 1800s, the building in later years became a local pub for the villagers of Dolgarrog for many years. In the mid-1990s it became the only restaurant in the village, mostly serving traditional Welsh food, sourced locally from the Conwy Valley. The pub closed for business in September 2010, and is now a private dwelling.
