= Coedty Reservoir =

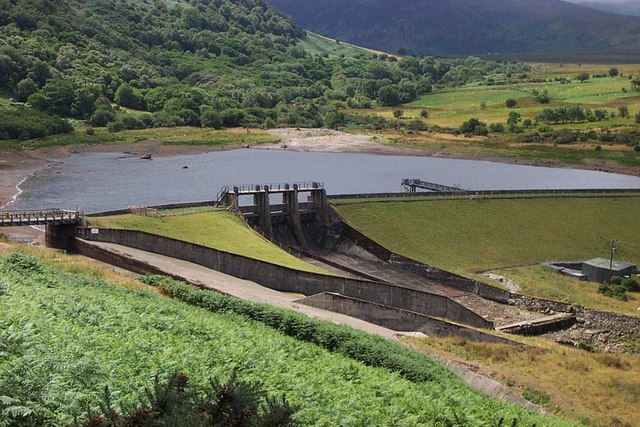
- Reservoir and dam

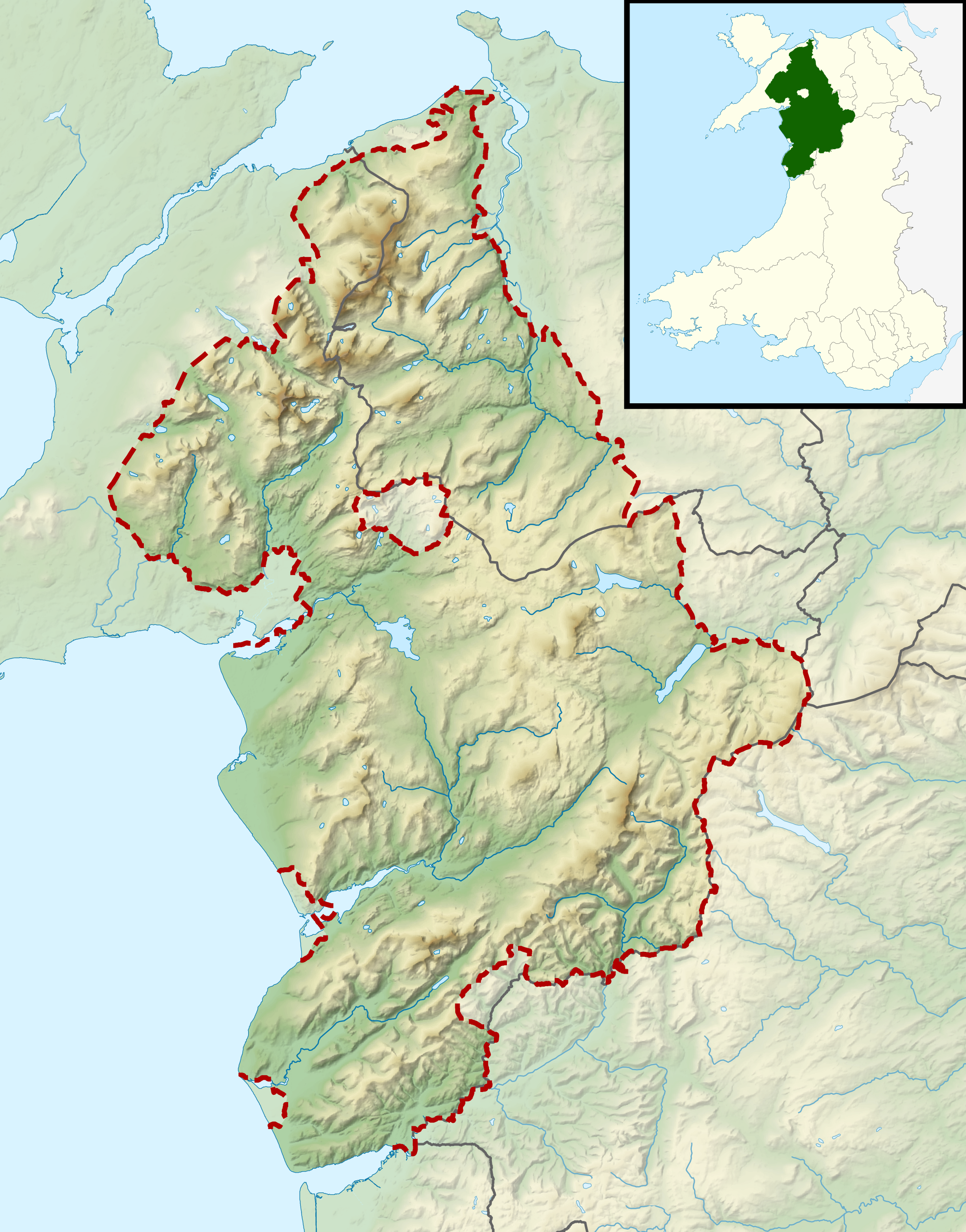
- Location within Snowdonia
- Location: Snowdonia, North Wales
- Coordinates: 53°10′56″N 3°51′53″W
- Type: Reservoir
- Primary inflows: Afon Porth-llwyd
- Basin countries: United Kingdom
- Surface area: 12 acres (49,000 m^{2})
- Surface elevation: 900 feet (274 m)

Coedty Reservoir is a reservoir in Snowdonia, North Wales. It is fed by the waters of Afon Porth-llwyd which flows from Llyn Eigiau. The reservoir lies at a height of 900 feet (274 m), and measures some 12 acres (49,000 m^{2}) in size. It contains brown trout.

The original dam was built in 1924 to provide hydro-electric power to the aluminium smelting works in Dolgarrog. In 1925, the Eigiau dam broke, and the flood of water from that also burst Coedty dam. The resultant flood caused the loss of 16 lives in Dolgarrog.

The dam was rebuilt in 1926, and altered again in 1956.

Water from the reservoir, which has a catchment area of around 27 square kilometres, is carried via a large metal pipe 3 km long, down to the hydro-electric power-station in Dolgarrog.

Coedty dam is a balance tip dam; water flows from it automatically when it reaches high levels. This excess water flows into a spectacular gorge used by outdoor pursuit groups. Gorge walking here, however, can be dangerous because of the sudden releases of water from the reservoir which can occur.

The eastern side of the lake is skirted by the trackbed of the former Eigiau Tramway, created to aid the construction and maintenance of Llyn Eigiau dam. Nearby the Cowlyd Tramway branched off, built to aid the construction of the dam at Llyn Cowlyd.
