= Y Fronllwyd =

Peak in Snowdonia, Wales

Coordinates: 53°08.8′N 4°11.6′W

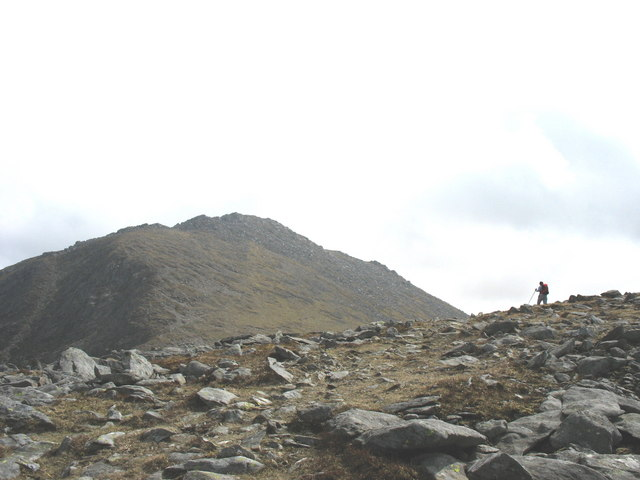
- Carnedd y Filiast from Y Fronllwyd summit

Highest point
- Elevation: 720 m (2,360 ft)
- Prominence: 16 m (52 ft)
- Listing: Nuttall

Naming
- Language of name: Welsh

Geography
- Location: Gwynedd, Wales
- Parent range: Glyderau
- OS grid: SH617631
- Topo map: OS Landranger 115, OS Outdoor Leisure 17

Climbing
- Easiest route: Walk

Y Fronllwyd, also known as Carnedd y Filiast North Top, is a top of Carnedd y Filiast in Snowdonia, Wales forming part of the Glyderau. It is the northern end of the Glyder mountain range. The summit has good views of Bethesda, the Penrhyn Quarry, the Carneddau, Elidir Fawr and the Menai Strait. The summit was included on the original Nuttall's list, subsequently deleted and then re-included after detailed re-surveying.
