= Carnedd y Filiast (Glyderau) =

Mountain in Snowdonia, Wales

Coordinates: 53°08.7′N 4°03.6′W

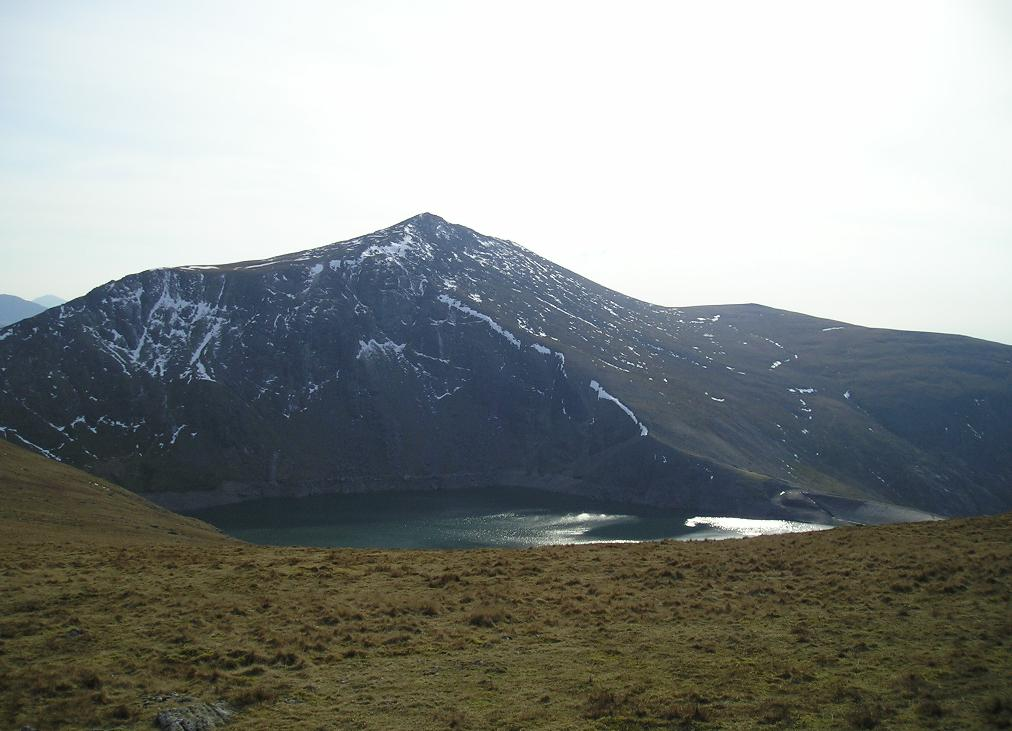
- Elidir Fawr from Carnedd y Filiast summit

Highest point
- Elevation: 821 m (2,694 ft)
- Prominence: 76 m (249 ft)
- Listing: Hewitt, Nuttall

Naming
- Language of name: Welsh

Geography
- Location: Gwynedd, Wales
- Parent range: Glyderau
- OS grid: SH622629
- Topo map: OS Landranger 115, OS Outdoor Leisure 17

Climbing
- Easiest route: Walk

Listed summits of Carnedd y Filiast (Glyderau)
Name	Grid ref	Height	Status
Mynydd Perfedd		812 m (2,664 ft)	sub Hewitt, Nuttall
Y Fronllwyd		720 m (2,362 ft)	Nuttall

Carnedd y Filiast is a mountain in Snowdonia, Wales, forming part of the Glyderau. It, along with its top Y Fronllwyd (720 m), forms the most northerly summit in the Glyderau. The average annual temperature on Carnedd y Filiast is estimated to be around 4 Celsius.

The summit is very rocky and has a number of cairns, as it has a vast expanse of layered slab of its crag features, giving rise to some exceptionally long, easy mountain routes, some giving over 1,000 feet of continuous climbing. Many routes are notable for their almost complete lack of protection and total isolation, and the summit affords good views of Anglesey, Snowdon, Carneddau, the Glyderau, Tryfan, Foel Goch, Y Garn and Elidir Fawr, along with Marchlyn Mawr reservoir. The Isle of Man and the Wicklow Mountains in Ireland can be seen on exceptionally clear days. It is about the 25th highest peak in Snowdonia.

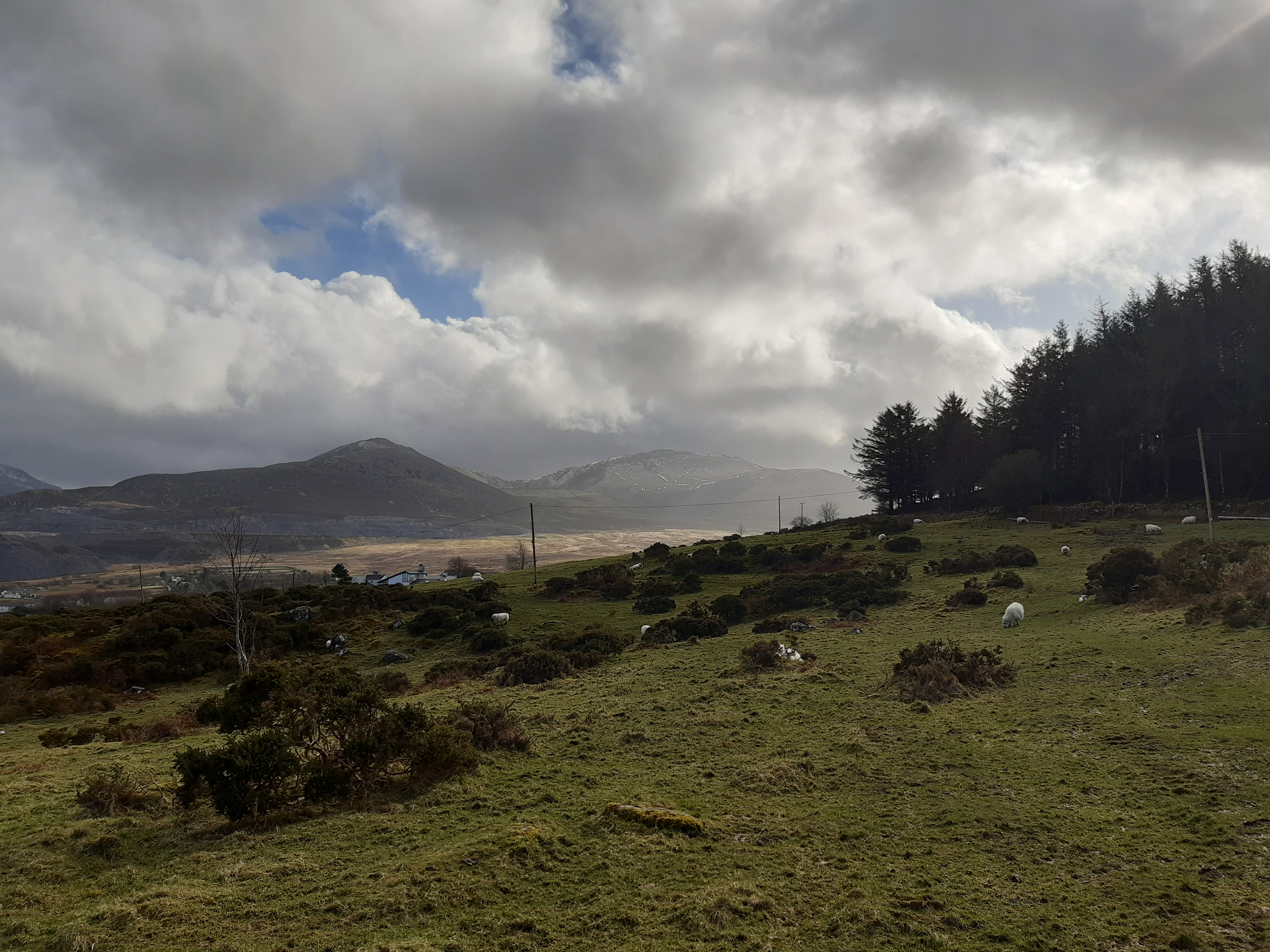
Carnedd y Filiast, Elidir Fawr and the reservoir, seen from the slopes of Moel-y-Ci
