= Curnock =

Curnock is a surname. Notable people with the surname include:

- James Curnock (1812-1862), English portrait painter
- James Jackson Curnock (1839-1891), English landscape painter
