= Gallt yr Ogof =

Mountain in Snowdonia, North Wales

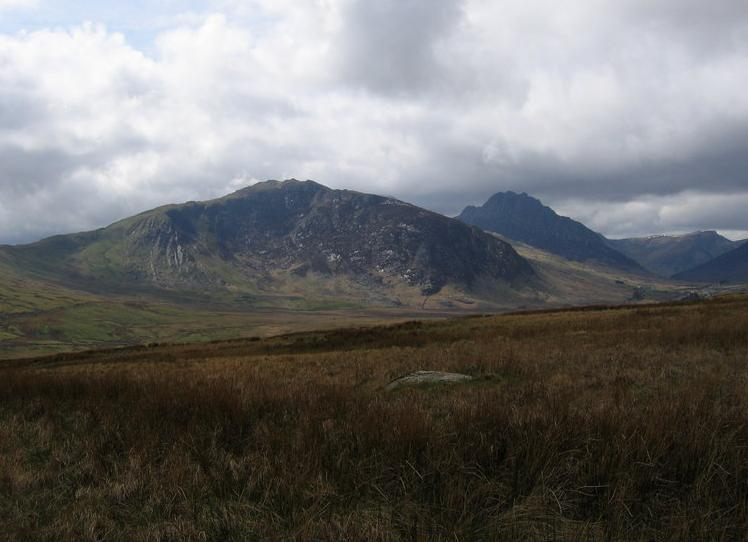
- Gallt yr Ogof and Tryfan from Creigiau Gleision

Highest point
- Elevation: 763 m (2,503 ft)
- Prominence: 42 m (138 ft)
- Parent peak: Glyder Fawr
- Listing: Hewitt, Nuttall
- Coordinates: 53°06′26″N 3°57′46″W

Naming
- Language of name: Welsh

Geography
- Location within Wales
- Location: Conwy, Wales
- OS grid: SH685585
- Topo map: OS Landranger 115

Gallt yr Ogof is a mountain in Snowdonia, North Wales. It is a subsidiary top of Glyder Fawr, and is the most easterly summit over 2,000 feet in the Glyderau mountain range, the most easterly hill being Cefn y Capel. Gallt yr Ogof is 763 metres high.

It is a sister peak to Y Foel Goch, which is located on the ridge heading west to Glyder Fach. As its name suggests there is a cave to be found on the cliffs on the precipitous eastern side of the peak.
