= Llyn Peris =

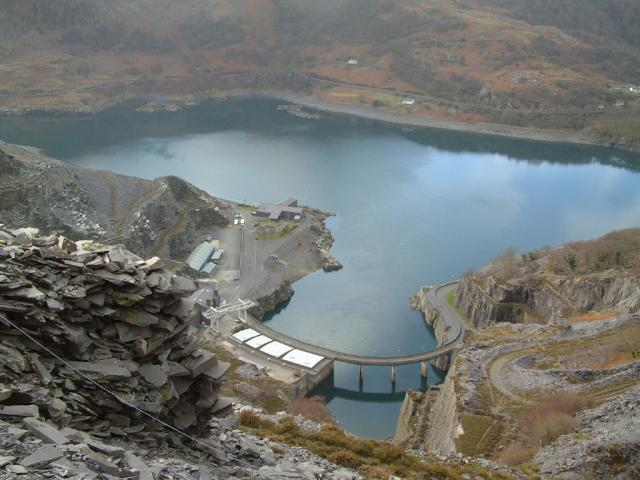

- Location within Gwynedd
- Location: Snowdonia, Wales
- Coordinates: 53°6′46″N 4°6′18″W
- Type: moraine dammed lake
- Basin countries: United Kingdom
- Max. length: 1.8 km (1.1 mi)

Llyn Peris is a lake in Snowdonia, Wales, approximately 1.8 km long and situated close to the villages of Llanberis and Nant Peris, and the smaller twin of Llyn Padarn. The lake was formed glacially and is an example of a moraine-dammed lake. Llyn Peris is named after Saint Peris, an early Christian saint of whom little is known. The lake is flanked on one side by the mountain Elidir Fawr and the former slate quarry of Dinorwig. Above the opposite bank are the hills of Derlwyn and Clogwyn Mawr and a rock formation known as the Lady of Snowdon, due to its resemblance to a human face. The ruins of Dolbadarn Castle are also located on a mound above the lake.

The lake now forms the lower reservoir of Dinorwig power station, and the administrative buildings for the station are situated on the lake shore. Water is released into the lake from Marchlyn Mawr (the upper reservoir) to produce electricity during periods of peak demand. This water is, in turn, pumped back to the upper reservoir using electricity purchased at off-peak periods. The water level of the lake therefore varies considerably, depending on UK electricity demand. Excess water from the lake drains into Llyn Padarn.

During construction of the power station, when the capacity of the lake was increased considerably at this time, with the removal of a large quantity of slate waste, rare Welsh Arctic char fish were removed to four other lakes in the neighbouring Carneddau mountains, namely Ffynnon Llugwy, Llyn Cowlyd, Llyn Melynllyn and Llyn Dulyn, where they are still to be found. Although Llyn Peris itself was not restocked, some char have found their way back to the lake.

Parts of the lake shore are designated as a Site of Special Scientific Interest for Glacial Geology.
