= Carnedd y Filiast =

Carnedd y Filiast is the name of several mountains in Wales:

- Carnedd y Filiast (Glyderau) — an 821 m peak in the Glyderau
- Carnedd y Filiast (Cerrigydrudion) — a 669 m peak in the Arenigs
