= James Jackson Curnock =

English painter (1839–1891)

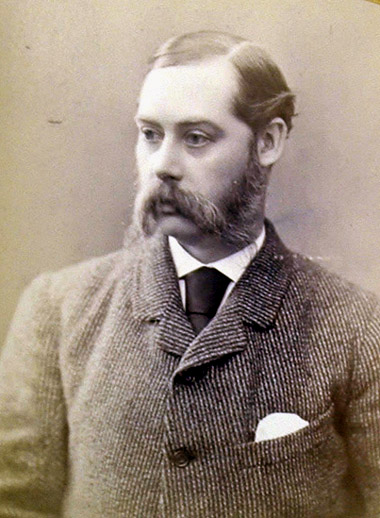
- James Jackson Curnock, 1869
- Born: 9 June 1839; Bristol, Avon, England
- Died: 17 November 1891 (aged 52); Bristol
- Resting place: Arnos Vale Cemetery, Bristol
- Known for: Landscape painting
- Notable work: The Llugwy at Capel Curig
- Movement: Romanticism

James Jackson Curnock (9 June 1839 - 17 November 1891) was an English landscape painter in the Romantic tradition and became an accomplished recorder of Wales’ landscapes in watercolours. Born in Bristol, he also painted scenes further afield in Cornwall, Dartmoor and occasional parts of Scotland in the genre of landscape painting.

== Biography ==
James Jackson Curnock was born on 9 June 1839 in Bristol. Known affectionately as ‘JJ’, he was the son of the portrait painter James Curnock. He remained at the family home throughout his life with his widowed mother, Sarah, and sister Alice on Richmond Hill in Clifton parish of Bristol. Around 1865, Curnock served in one of the British Hussar regiments as an officer cadet.

== Art ==
Curnock was a familiar Victorian painter using watercolours exhibiting widely around the UK capturing the Welsh landscape, notably the lakes, mountain ranges and river valleys of Snowdonia — Tryfan, Carnedd Dafydd, Llynnau, Glyderau mountain ranges, the valleys of the Llugwy, and Mawddach, Lledr rivers, and the Glaslyn, Llyn Idwal lakes, among others. Curnock also painted the glens, lochs and moors of Scotland, the Cornish coast, Dartmoor and the river valleys of England.

In 1867, the Art Journal reported on the 44th exhibition of the Society of British Artists that Curnock showed “more than promise” and “the artist has already attained mastery over nature, and gives to the bold scenes of North Wales truth and considerable grandeur”. The recognition continued in the Art Journal of 1871 citing Curnock as “a rising young painter” with a submitted landscape for the Winter Exhibition of the SBA being the “most poetic and artistic” he had so far submitted.

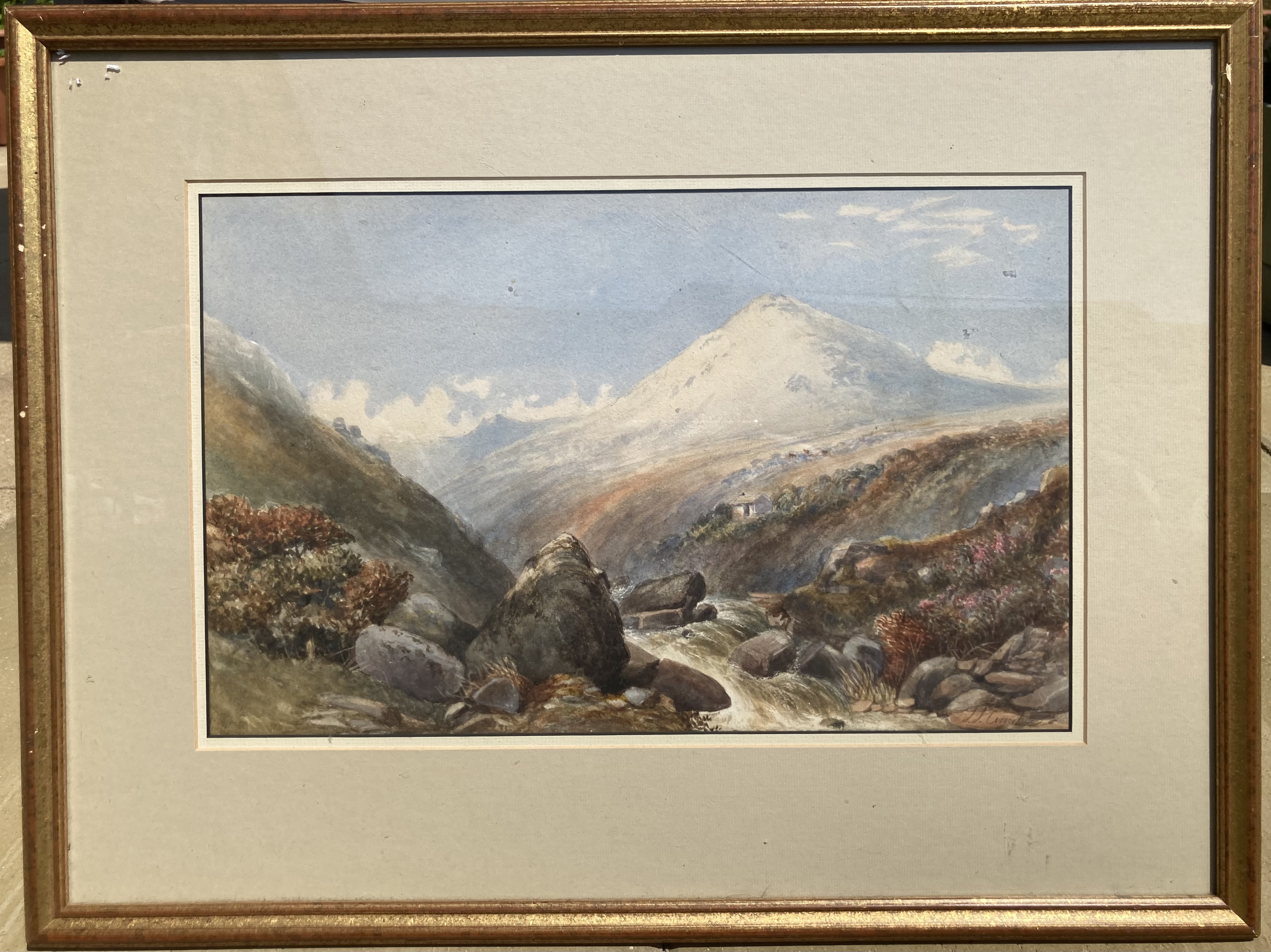
Brad Tor mountain on Dartmoor (known today as Brat Tor)

Curnock exhibited eleven times at the Royal Academy (London, England) between 1873 and 1889. He exhibited in the principal London exhibitions 114 times between 1863 and 1891 and he was appointed Fellow of the Society of Artists, ‘FSA’.

John Ruskin, whose “truth to nature” philosophy influenced 19th century landscape artists, gave Curnock a favourable review in the Royal Academy 1875 for his painting, The Llugwy at Capel Curig. Ruskin wrote “I find this to be the most attentive and refined landscape of all here - too subdued in its tone for my own pleasure but skilful and affectionate in a high degree; …. for here is a calm stream patiently studied. The distant woods and hills are all very tender and beautiful.”

In 1879, he exhibited at the Yorkshire Fine Art and Industrial Exhibition with his The Llugwy and Moel Siabod paintings each listed for £100, equivalent to £10,000 at 2023 prices.

He became an Associate Member of the Royal Cambrian Academy (Wales) in 1884 and a full member in 1885. Curnock exhibited at the RCA in 1884 at the Cardiff Public Hall with his Clearing up after rain, North Wales painted three years earlier, and Trifaen.

He died on 17 November 1891 in his native Bristol, aged 52. The Bristol Art Gallery’s major exhibition in 1906 included two of Curnock’s paintings; A Welsh Moor and View in Wales.

== Gallery ==
Curnock’s works have remained popular and command modest premium prices at auction. In 1998, Clifton Gorge, Avon sold for £3,450 at Christie’s and Cattle on a Highland path, sold for £2,160 at Bonhams in 2008.

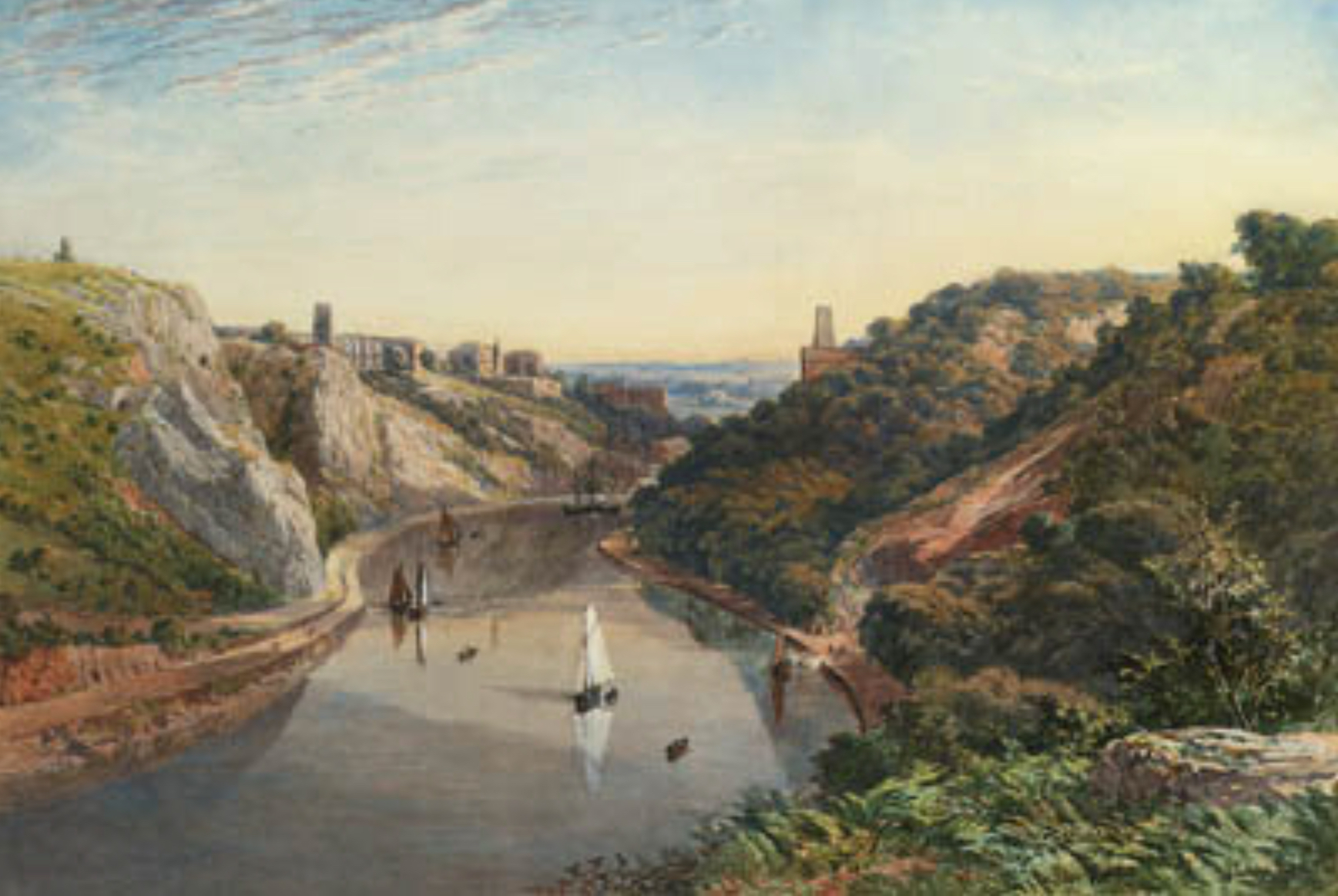
Clifton Gorge on River Avon

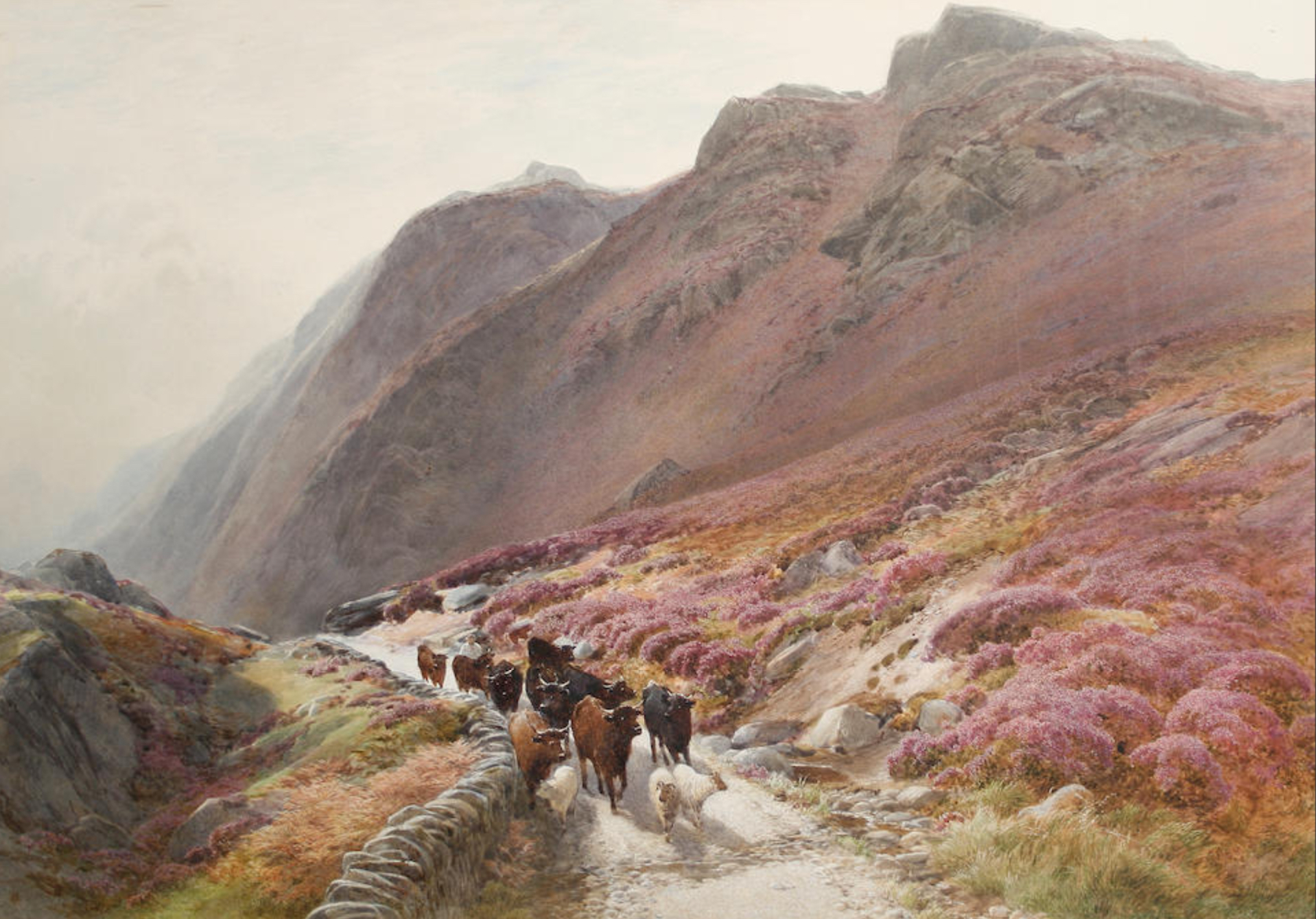
Cattle on a Highland path
