= Gwynt =

Gwynt means wind in Welsh and may refer to

- Castell y Gwynt, a top of the Glyder Fach mountain in north-west Wales
- Gwynt y Môr, an offshore wind farm near North Wales
- The Wind (poem) (Y Gwynt), by Dafydd ap Gwilym
