= Mynydd Perfedd =

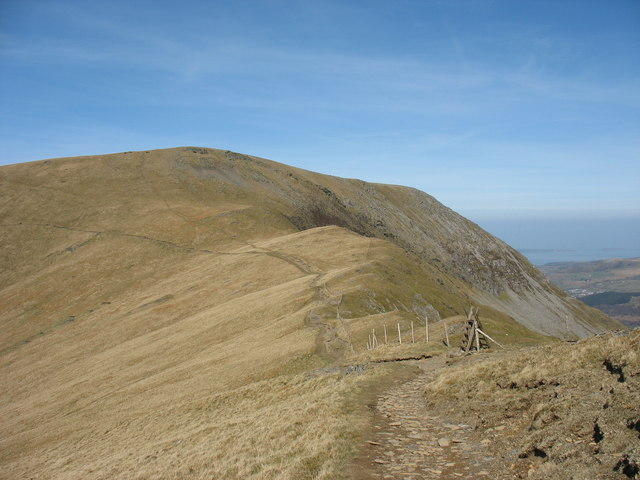
- Mynydd Perfedd seen from Foel-goch

Highest point
- Elevation: 813 m (2,667 ft)
- Prominence: 20 m (66 ft)
- Listing: sub Hewitt, Nuttall
- Coordinates: 53°08′12″N 4°03′29″W

Naming
- Language of name: Welsh

Geography
- Location: Gwynedd, Wales
- Parent range: Glyderau
- OS grid: SH623619
- Topo map: OS Landranger 115, OS Outdoor Leisure 17

Climbing
- Easiest route: Walk

Mynydd Perfedd is a mountain in Snowdonia, Wales, forming part of the Glyderau. The summit has a shelter cairn, offering good views of Foel-goch's north-eastern face, and the Carneddau.

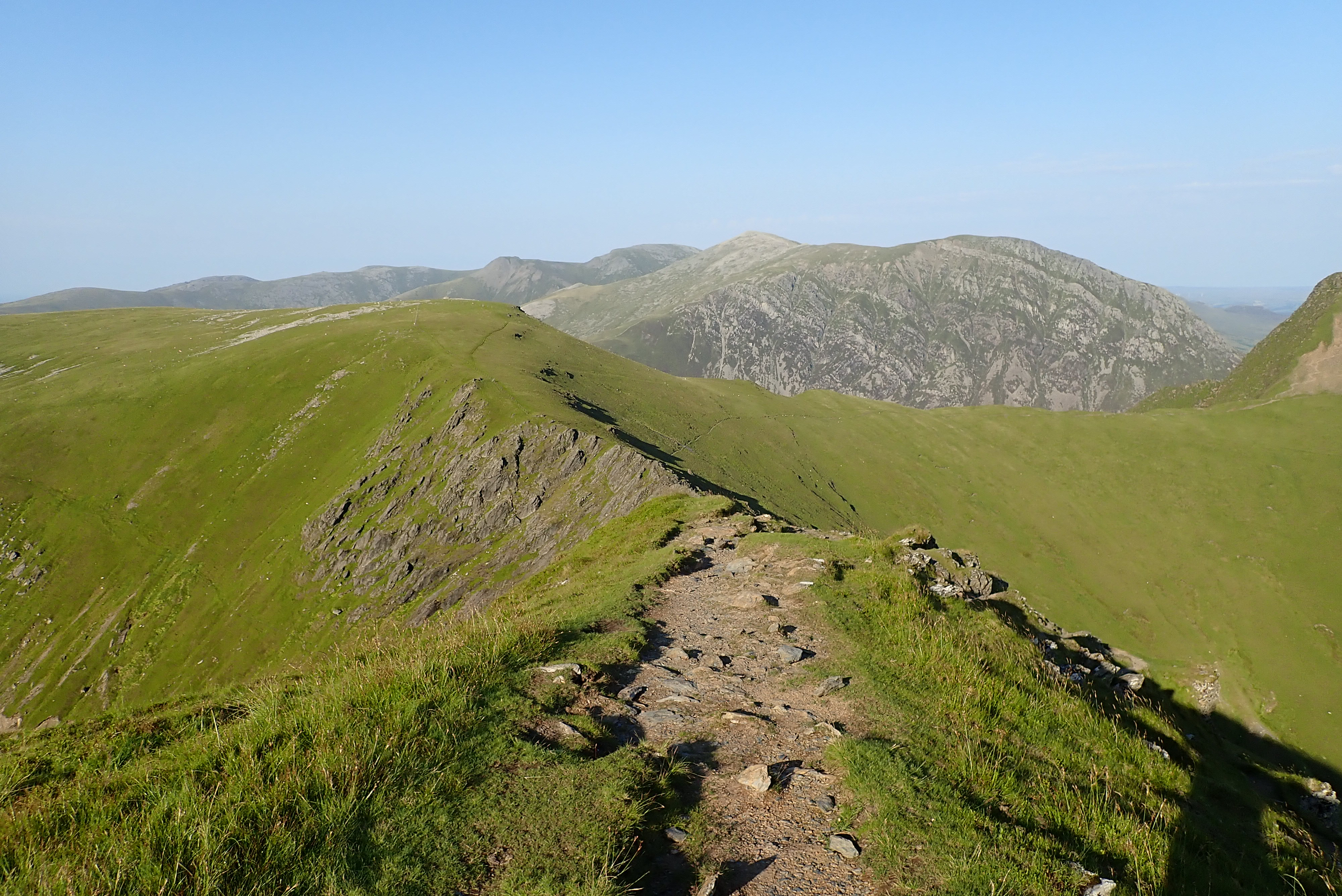
Mynydd Peredd as seen from the ridge along Elidir Fawr, above the reservoir, with the Carneddau in the background

Between it and Carnedd y Filiast, there are dramatic cliffs to the east, including the famous Llechen Cytrolar. To the south lies the parent peak Elidir Fawr, to the west Carnedd y Filiast and to the east Foel-goch and Y Garn. It is 812 metres (2,664 ft) high. The average annual temperature of the mountain is about 6 Celsius.
