= Y Foel Goch =

Mountain in Conwy County Borough, Wales

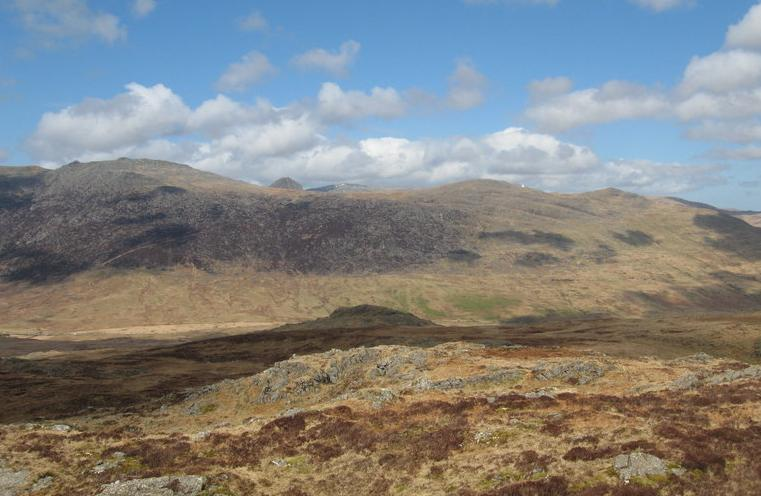
- Glyder Fach, Y Foel Goch and Gallt yr Ogof from Moel Siabod

Highest point
- Elevation: 805 m (2,641 ft)
- Prominence: 63 m (207 ft)
- Parent peak: Glyder Fawr
- Listing: Hewitt, Nuttall
- Coordinates: 53.1043°N 3.9779°W

Naming
- English translation: red bold hill
- Language of name: Welsh

Geography
- Location: Snowdonia, Wales
- OS grid: SH677582
- Topo map: OS Landranger 115

Y Foel Goch is a mountain in Snowdonia, north-west Wales, and is a sister peak along with Gallt yr Ogof to Glyder Fach. Between Glyder Fach and its summit lies Llyn Caseg-fraith, a popular lake for photographing Tryfan and its reflection.

The summit is grassy with a few small rock outcrops and is marked with a small cairn. The views are limited to the bulky neighbours of Moel Siabod, Tryfan and Glyder Fach. The ridge continues eastwards to Gallt yr Ogof.
