= Glyderau =

Mountain group in Snowdonia, Wales

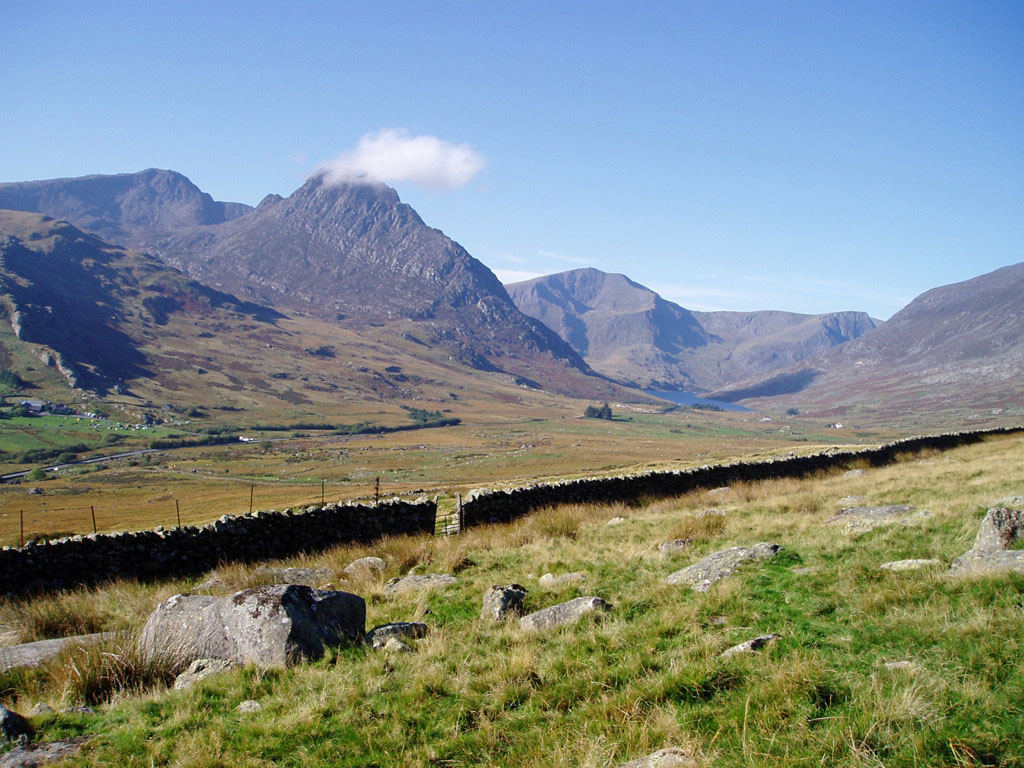
- The Glyderau from the north-east, dominating the Llugwy/Ogwen gap through which the A5 road passes. From left to right: Glyder Fach, Tryfan, Y Garn and Foel Goch. Llyn Ogwen is in the distance centre-right.

Highest point
- Peak: Glyder Fawr
- Elevation: 1,000.8 m (3,283 ft)
- Coordinates: 53°06′03″N 4°01′47″W

Naming
- Etymology: From the Welsh word "Cludair", meaning a heap of stones

Geography
- Country: Wales
- Region: Snowdonia

The Glyderau (a Welsh plural form, also known in English as the Glyders) are a mountain group in Snowdonia, North Wales. The name derives from the highest peaks in the range, Glyder Fawr and Glyder Fach. According to Sir Ifor Williams, the word "Glyder" derives from the Welsh word "Cludair", meaning a heap of stones.

The Glyderau stretch from Mynydd Llandegai to Capel Curig, and include five of Wales' fourteen or fifteen summits over 3000 feet; these include Tryfan, considered one of the finest mountains in Wales and one of the few mountains on the British mainland requiring scrambling to reach the summit. The eastern half of the range in particular, including Glyder Fawr, Glyder Fach and Tryfan, is very popular with walkers and climbers.

Dinorwig Power Station, a hydroelectric pump-storage system, is located in a man-made cavern within Elidir Fawr. The slopes of the Glyderau also include the lake Llyn Idwal, and a number of classic climbing areas such as Rhiwiau Caws.

== Geology ==
The Glyderau were formed in the Ordovician period about 500 million years ago as the result of two land masses moving together and causing the Snowdonia massif to rise up. Since then, erosion and the advance and retreat of glaciers during the Ice Ages has worn down the mountains to their present proportions. The underlying rock is a mixture of sedimentary and volcanic material. The last ice sheet retreated about 10,000 years ago and Cwm Idwal is a good example of a cirque formed by the ice. The main glacier flowed down the adjoining Nant Ffrancon Valley, a route now followed by the A5 road, and Cwm Idwal housed a side glacier. The ice scarred the surrounding cliffs, hollowed out the bed of Llyn Idwal and dumped rocks and other material that formed moraines at its foot. Massive boulders and shattered rocks crashed down from above to form the boulder fields and screes.

The land was originally covered with native forest mostly consisting of birch and oak. This was cleared over the millennia by the Neolithic, Bronze Age and Iron Age farmers that settled here and now there is little tree cover. Groups of feral goats can still be found on the Glyderau, probably the remnants of the herds that were farmed here a thousand years ago. The large number of sheep that now graze the common land were introduced in the 18th century with the rise of the woollen industry.

== Access ==
The Glyderau present a much more rocky appearance than the smooth rounded humps of the Carneddau just to the north. The ridge between the summits of Glyder Fawr and Glyder Fach is covered with coarse grasses and heathers and strewn with boulders and slabs of rocks. The ascent to the summit of Tryfan requires scrambling rather than just walking. Tryfan, Glyder Fach and the cliffs around Cwm Idwal offer rock climbing with routes ranging from those suitable for beginners to those requiring great technical expertise. The mountains can be approached from Llyn Ogwen to the north, where there is a car park, or from Nant Peris in the Llanberis Pass where there is a park and ride service. Buses run hourly from Bangor to Llanberis and there is a less frequent service from Bethesda to Llyn Ogwen.

== Cwm Idwal ==
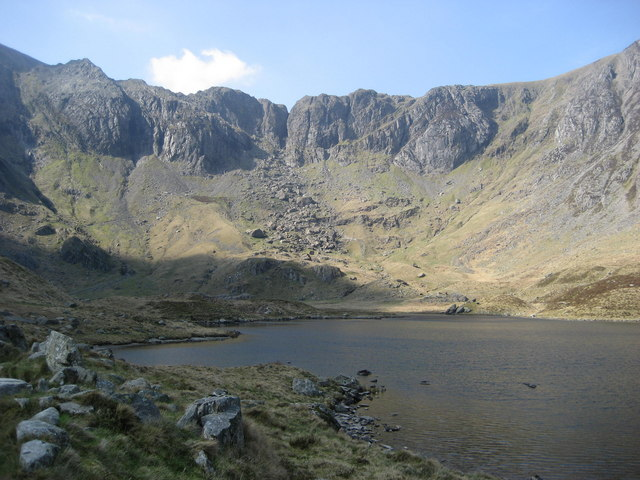
Llyn Idwal and the Devil's Kitchen

The north-facing amphitheatre-shaped valley of Cwm Idwal with its dark cliffs has a unique flora, and some plants here are the most southerly remnants in Britain of the Arctic/Alpine flora. The Snowdon lily (Lloydia serotina) is found here, high on mountain ledges, the only place in Britain where it is found. Other Alpine species include the purple saxifrage (Saxifraga oppositifolia), tufted saxifrage (Saxifraga cespitosa), Alpine meadow rue (Thalictrum alpinum) and mountain sorrel (Oxyria digyna). Because of the scientific interest of this valley, sheep have been excluded from it to allow the native plants to flourish and it has been made into a national nature reserve. The lake itself is shallow and fringed with rushes, reeds and bottle sedge (Carex rostrata). Plants growing in the water or on the damp ground nearby include awlwort, pillwort, waterwort and spring quillwort (Isoetes echinospora). Other plants growing on damp shady ledges include the Welsh poppy (Meconopsis cambrica), the wood-rush (Lazula sylvatica), water avens (Geum rivale), wood anemone (Anemone nemorosa) and goldenrod (Solidago virgaurea). Animals that live here include badgers, foxes and polecats as well as buzzards (Buteo buteo), peregrine falcons (Falco peregrinus), choughs (Pyrrhocorax pyrrhocorax), skylarks (Alauda arvensis), black grouse (Tetrao tetrix) and red grouse (Lagopus lagopus).

In the cliffs above Llyn Idwal is a dark cleft in the rock known as Twll Du from which plumes of mist sometimes emanate. These were believed to be caused by ancient druids creating lightning bolts to keep the invading Romans at bay. Llyn Idwal itself was said to be named after a drowned boy, either the son of 8th century Prince Cadwalader, murdered by a rival, or the son of 12th century Prince Owain Gwynedd and killed by his uncle. The traveler Thomas Pennant, writing in the 1780s, stated that the local shepherds were in awe of the lake believing it to be "the haunt of Demons, and that no bird dare fly over its damned waters".

== Dinorwig Power Station ==
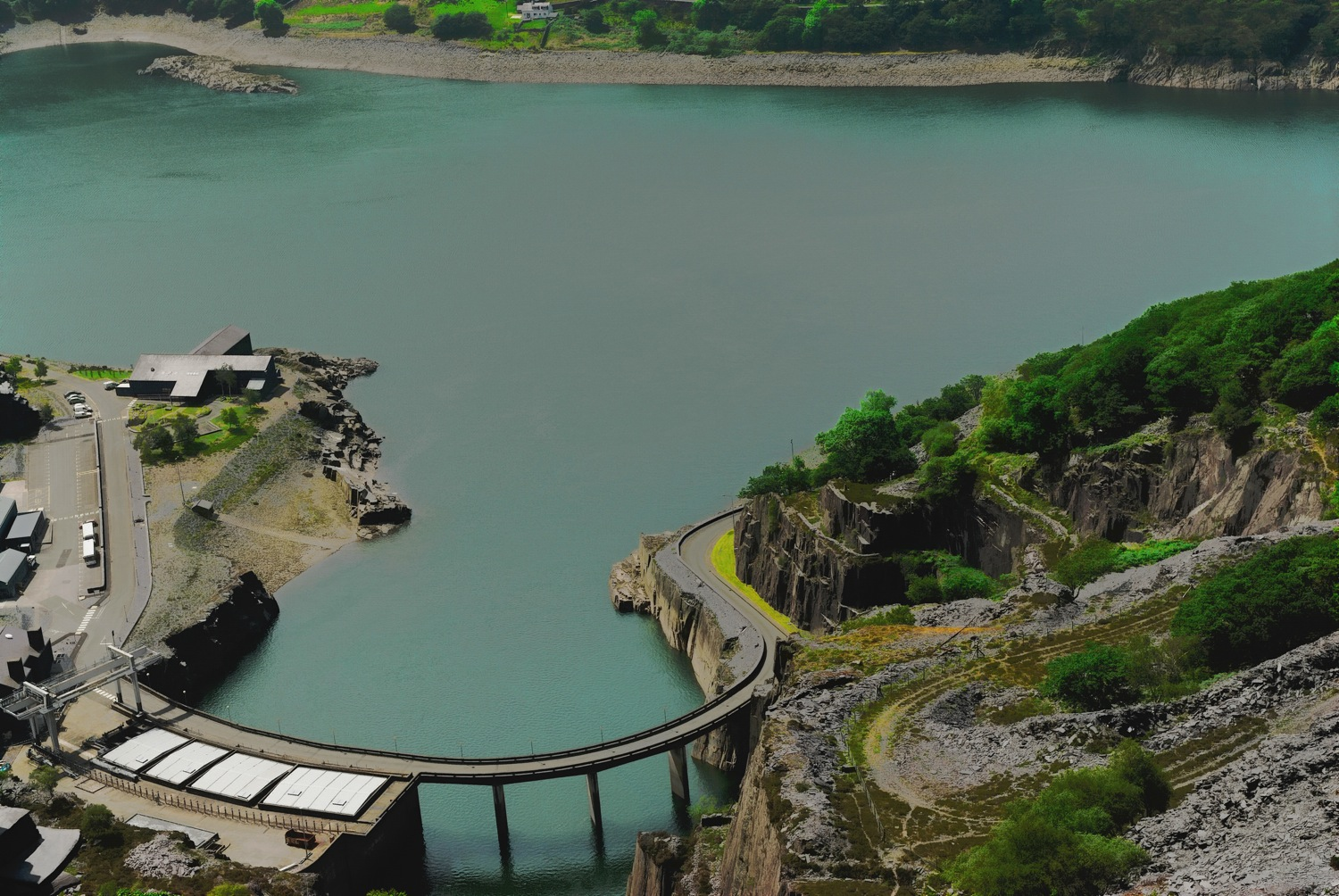
Llyn Peris

Deep inside the mountain of Elidir Fawr there is a power station and many miles of tunnels. Dinorwig Power Station, a pumped storage hydroelectric facility, was originally built to provide back up facilities and water storage to smooth out the peaks and troughs in demand associated with the inflexible output of nuclear power stations. When demand is low, water is pumped up the mountain and stored in Marchlyn Mawr reservoir, previously a slate quarry. The water is released to flow through turbines during times of high demand for electricity. The power is conveyed through underground cables to join the grid so as to have little visual impact on the Snowdonia National Park skyline.

== Management ==
The National Trust took over the management of the Glyderau and the Carneddau in 1951 in lieu of death duties on the Penrhyn Estate. The total area is about 7,000 hectares, half of which is common land with registered grazing rights for 45,000 sheep and 741 ponies. There are eight tenanted farms on the estate and the National Trust is responsible for the maintenance of footpaths and drystone walls, some of which date back many hundreds of years. The two mountain ranges form part of the Snowdonia National Park.

== Mountains in the Glyderau ==
This is a list of the main summits in the range, in order from west to east.

- Elidir Fawr (924 m)
- Carnedd y Filiast (821 m)
- Mynydd Perfedd (813 m)
- Foel Goch (831 m)
- Y Garn (947 m)
- Glyder Fawr (1,001 m)
- Glyder Fach (994 m)
- Tryfan (918 m)
- Y Foel Goch (805 m)
- Gallt yr Ogof (763 m)
- Cefn y Capel (c.460 m )

== In popular culture ==
Glyder Fach and Glyder Fawr are mentioned in, and form part of the setting for, the Half Man Half Biscuit song "Evening Of Swing (Has Been Cancelled)".
