= Fourteen Peaks =

Fourteen Peaks may refer to:

- Eight-thousanders, the fourteen mountains over 8000 metres
- Fourteeners, the mountains in the United States over 14000 feet
- Welsh 3000s, the mountains in Wales over 3000 feet
