= Castell y Gwynt =

Mountaintop in north-west Wales

Coordinates: 53.10491°N 4.00905°W

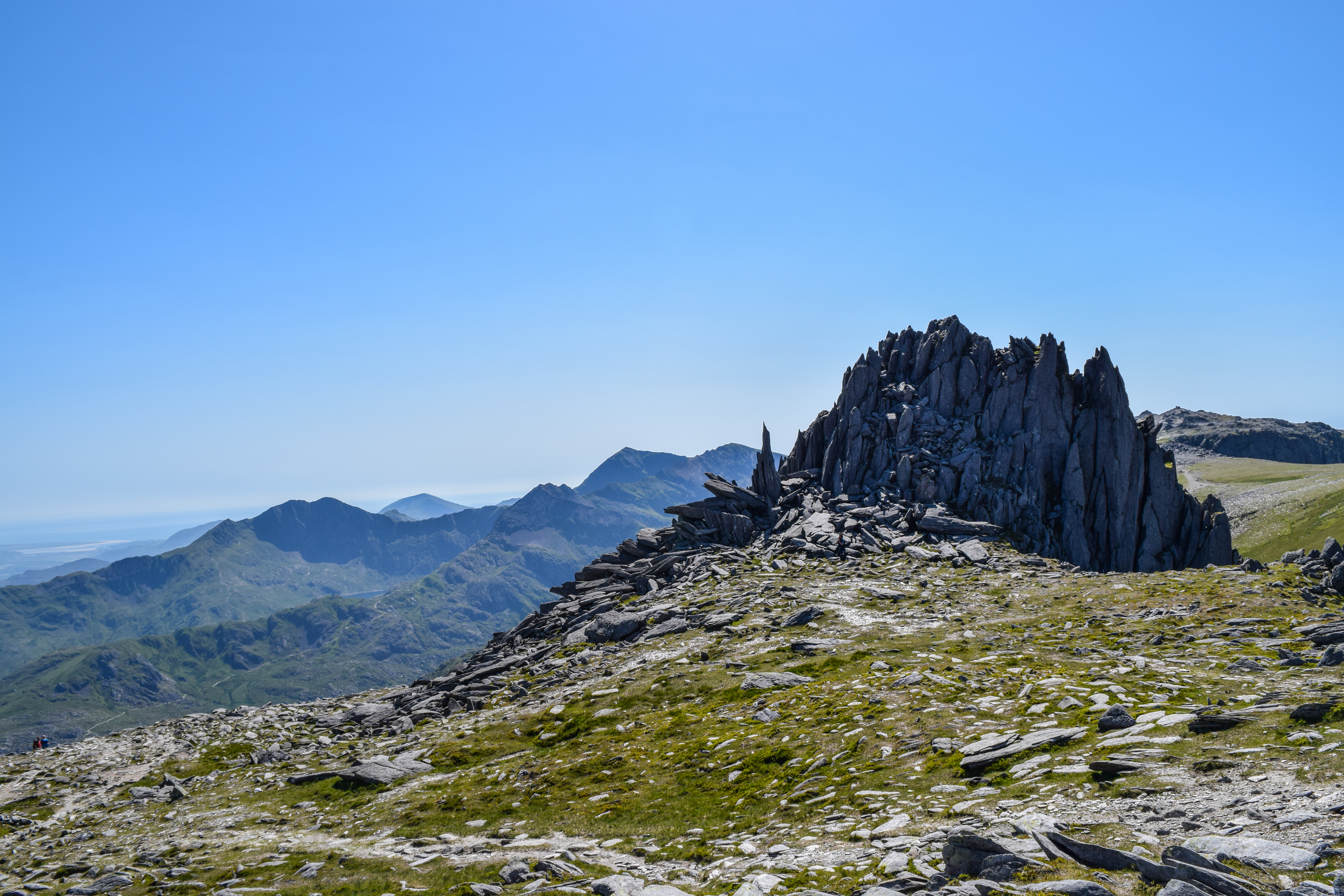
- Castell y Gwynt (in middle-ground) from Glyder Fach summit plateau, with Glyder Fawr behind (extreme right)

Highest point
- Elevation: 972 m (3,189 ft)
- Prominence: 16 m (52 ft)
- Parent peak: Glyder Fach
- Listing: Nuttall

Naming
- English translation: castle of the wind
- Language of name: Welsh

Geography
- Location: Snowdonia, Wales
- Parent range: Glyderau
- OS grid: SH656583
- Topo map: OS Landranger 115

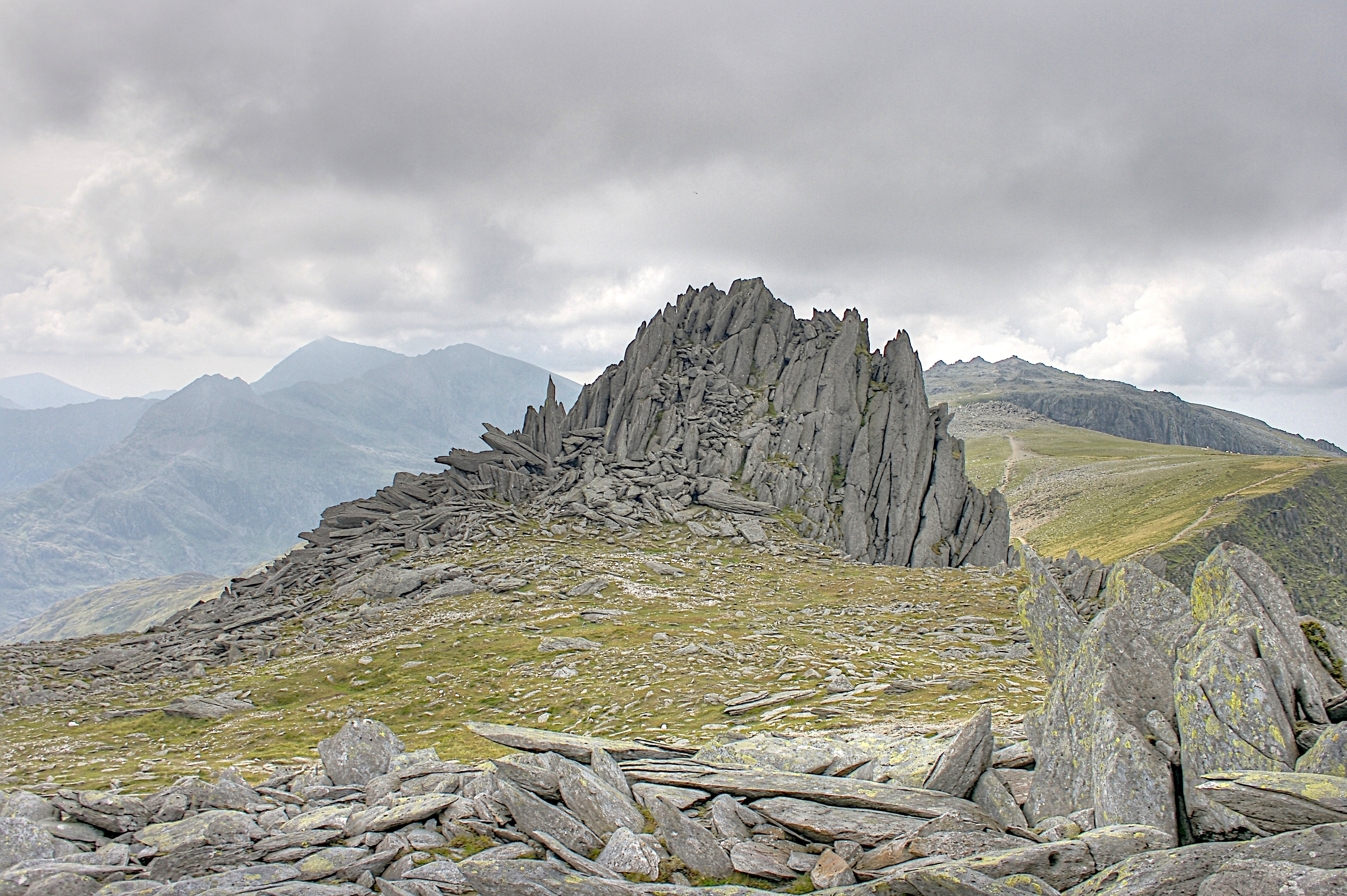

Castell y Gwynt (English: Castle of the Wind) is a top of Glyder Fach in Snowdonia, north-west Wales. It has the distinction of being the only 3000 ft Welsh summit classed as only a Nuttall, hence it is not included in the Welsh 3000s. It has a prominence of 15.7 m (51.5 ft), and was only included on the Nuttall's list after re-surveying in 2007. The top is more famous as a feature than a summit.

Castell y Gwynt and the "Cantilever Stone" featured in the 1981 film Dragonslayer.
