= Foel-goch =

Mountain in Snowdonia, Wales

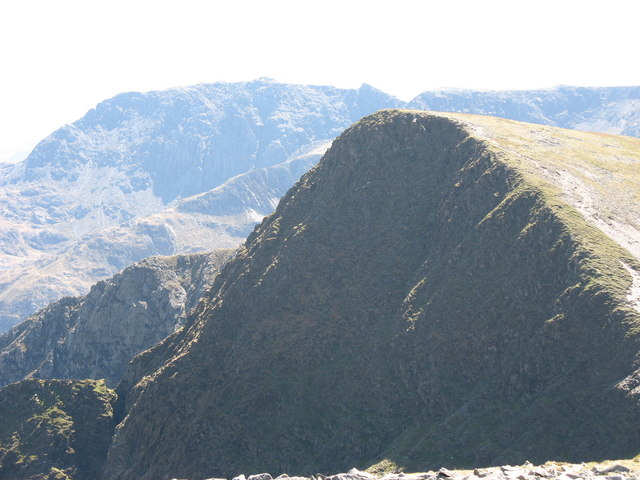
- Foel-goch from Mynydd Perfedd

Highest point
- Elevation: 831 m (2,726 ft)
- Prominence: 76 m (249 ft)
- Parent peak: Y Garn
- Listing: Hewitt, Nuttall
- Coordinates: 53.130372°N 4.051322°W

Geography
- Location: Gwynedd, Wales
- Parent range: Snowdonia
- Topo map: OS Landranger 115

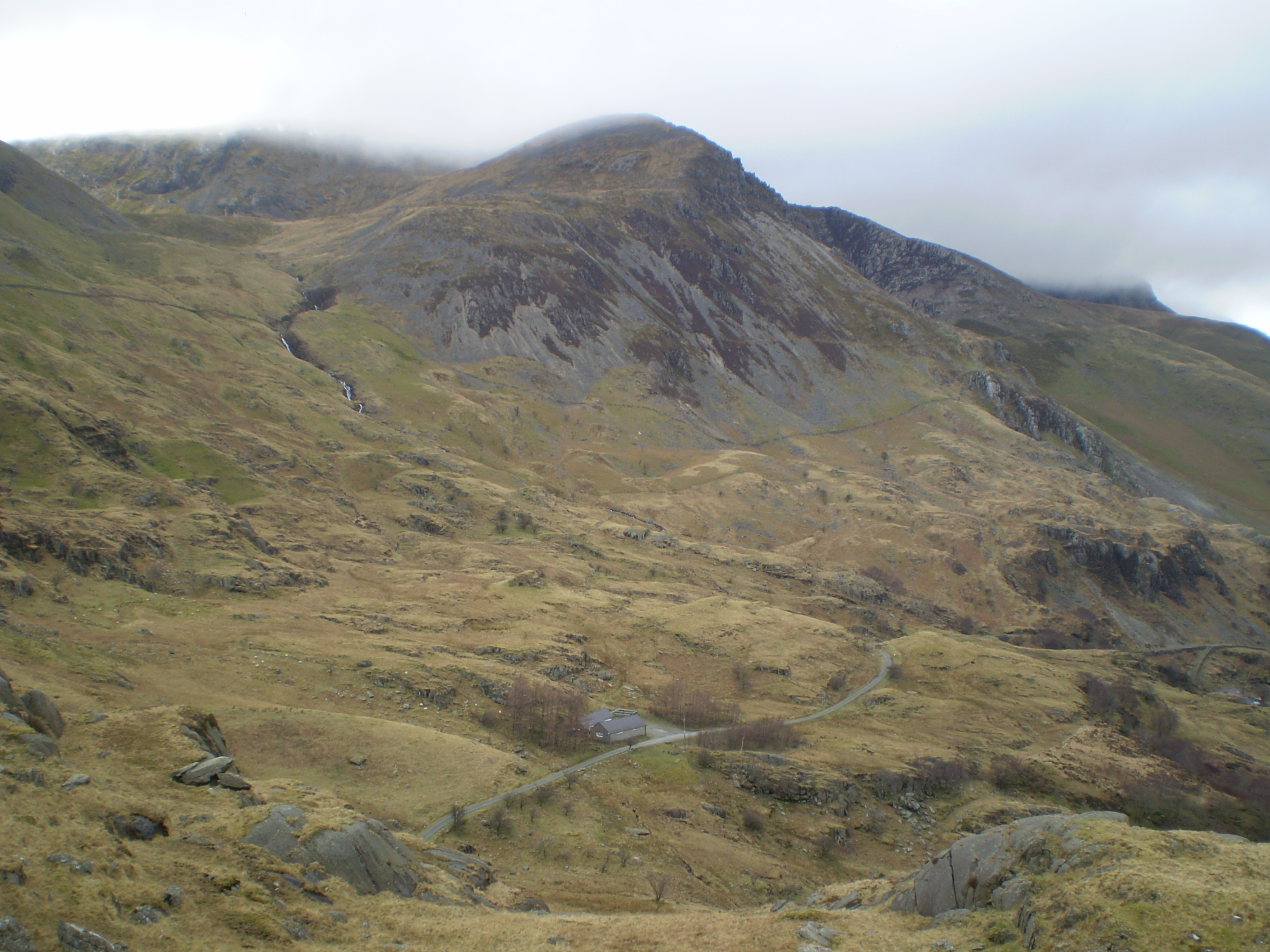
Foel-goch from Nant Ffrancon pass

Foel-goch is a mountain in Snowdonia, north-west Wales, and forms part of the Glyderau range, in Gwynedd. It lies in between Y Garn and Mynydd Perfedd.

Good views of Dyffryn Ogwen are seen with Pen yr Ole Wen, Carnedd Dafydd, Tryfan, Glyder Fawr and Elidir Fawr close by. Its height is 831 metres (2,726 ft).
