= Glyder Fach =

Mountain in north-west Wales

Coordinates: 53.10491°N 4.00905°W

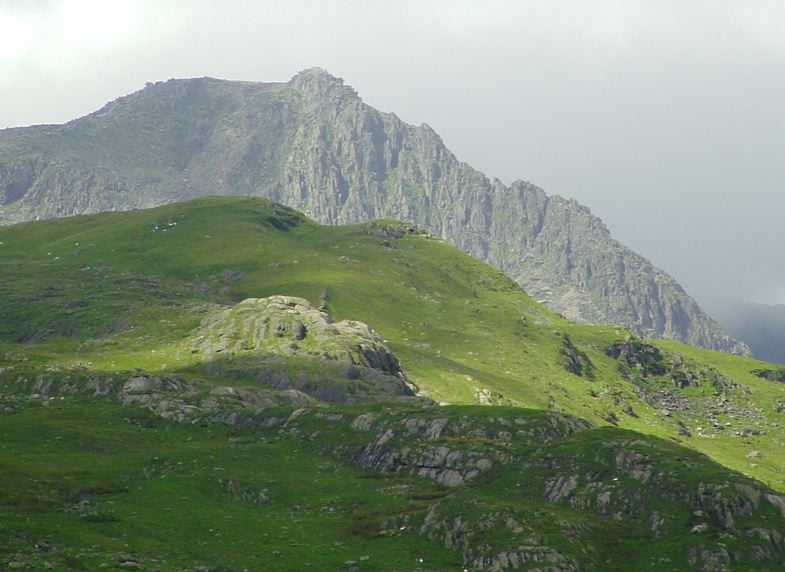
- Glyder Fach and Bristly Ridge from Gallt yr Ogof

Highest point
- Elevation: 994 m (3,261 ft)
- Prominence: 75 m (246 ft)
- Parent peak: Glyder Fawr
- Listing: Hewitt, Welsh 3000s, Nuttall, Furth

Naming
- English translation: small mound
- Language of name: Welsh
- Pronunciation: Welsh: [ˈɡlədɛr ˈvaːχ]

Geography
- Location: Snowdonia, Wales
- OS grid: SH656583
- Topo map: OS Landranger 115

Listed summits of Glyder Fach
Name	Grid ref	Height	Status
Castell y Gwynt		972 m (3,189 ft)	Nuttall

Glyder Fach is a mountain in Snowdonia, north-west Wales, and is the second highest of the Glyderau and the sixth highest in Wales. Routes to the summit lead from Tryfan and Bristly Ridge to the north, via Glyder Fawr from Pen-y-Pass to the south, and along the Glyder ridge to the east, towards Capel Curig. It is a popular spot for climbers.

According to Sir Ifor Williams, the word "Glyder" derives from the Welsh word "Gludair", meaning a heap of stones.

Situated near the summit is Y Gwyliwr, a large rock which from the correct angle appears to be precariously balanced, making it a popular place for photographs. (The name means 'The Sentinel', but is usually anglicised as The Cantilever.) Another notable feature, west of the summit, is Castell y Gwynt, a spiky rocky outcrop.

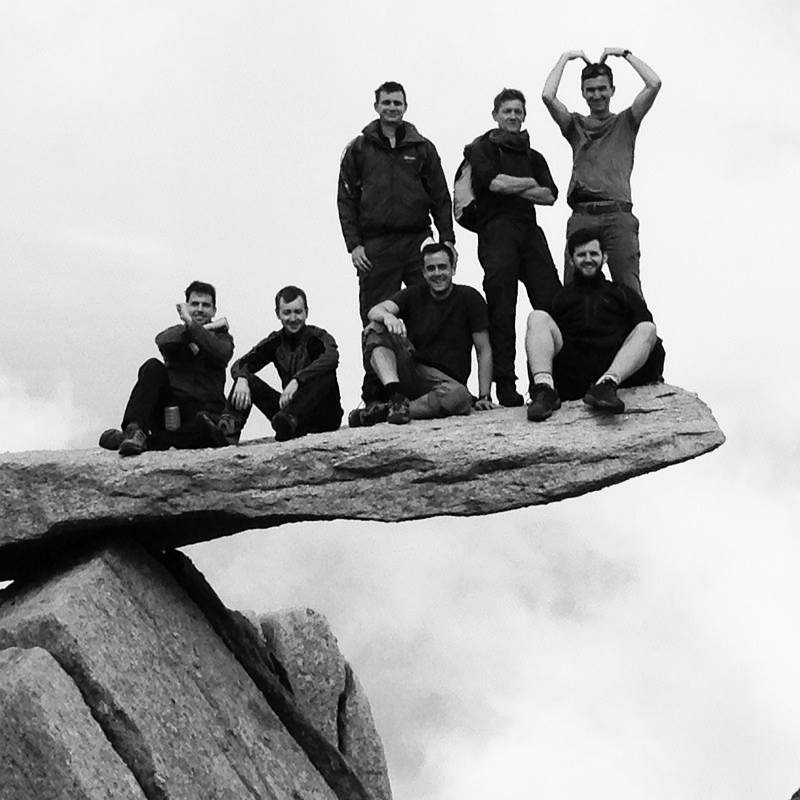
The Cantilever

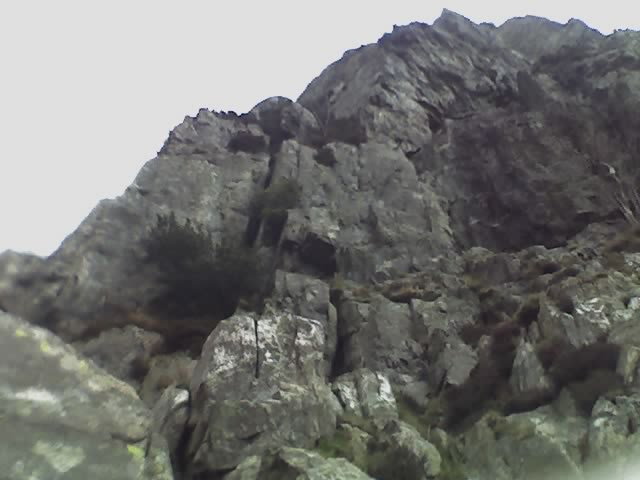
Flying Buttress, a popular VDiff climbing route.

== Bristly Ridge ==
Dexter Gully at start of Bristly Ridge

Bristly Ridge (Welsh: Y Grib Bigog) is a scramble in Snowdonia. It is located on the north side of Glyder Fach. Consensus puts the difficulty at Grade 1, but it is at the upper end of the grade and some lines qualify as Grade 2. There are some exposed and steep sections of climbing, particularly the upper pitch of Main Gully (also sometimes known as Dexter Gully) and the direct descent into Great Pinnacle Gap. However these sections may be by-passed in favour of easier lines (e.g., Sinister Gully may be ascended instead of Main Gully; an easier descent into Great Pinnacle Gap can be found on the left (east) side by crossing a sloping slab), reducing the overall difficulty to Grade 1.

== Incidental Information ==
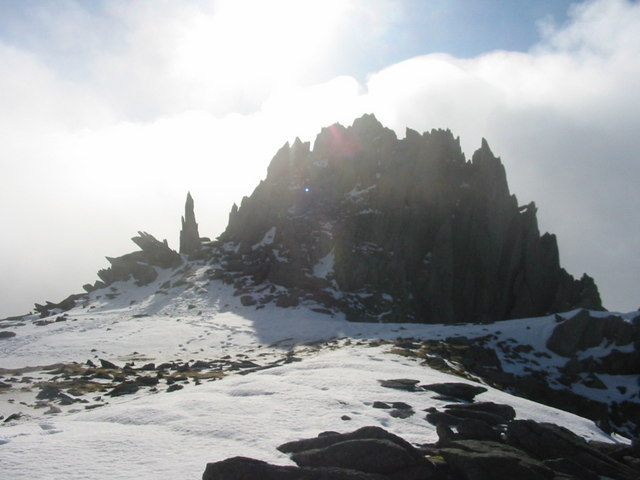
Castell y Gwynt in winter

"Castell y Gwynt" and the "Cantilever Stone" featured in Walt Disney's 1981 movie Dragonslayer; this was one entrance to the Dragon's lair.

Glyder Fach and Glyder Fawr are mentioned in, and form part of the setting for, the Half Man Half Biscuit song "Evening Of Swing (Has Been Cancelled)".
