= Dinorwig Power Station =

Hydroelectric power station in Wales

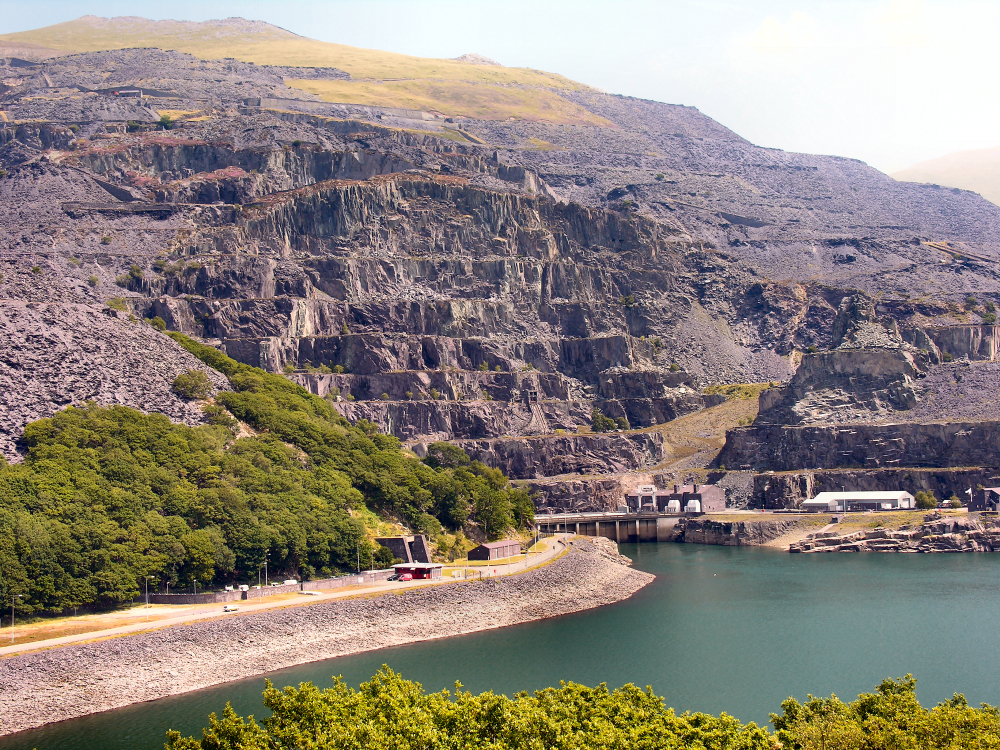
- Part of the power station as seen on the exterior of Elidir Fawr.

- Location within Wales
- Official name: Gorsaf Bŵer Dinorwig
- Location: Dinorwig, Wales
- Coordinates: 53°07′07″N 04°06′50″W
- Construction began: 1974
- Opening date: 1984
- Construction cost: £425 million
- Owner: First Hydro Company (a division of Engie)

Reservoir
- Creates: Upper: Marchlyn Mawr; Lower: Llyn Peris

Power Station
- Commission date: 1984
- Turbines: 6 × 300 MW (400,000 hp)
- Installed capacity: 1,800 MW (2,400,000 hp)
- Website www.engie.co.uk/dinorwig-power-station-en/

The Dinorwig Power Station (Welsh: Gorsaf Bŵer Dinorwig, pronounced [dɪˈnɔrwɪɡ]), known locally as Electric Mountain, or Mynydd Gwefru, is a pumped-storage hydroelectric scheme, near Dinorwig, Llanberis in Snowdonia national park in Gwynedd, north Wales. The scheme can supply a maximum power of 1,728 MW and has a storage capacity of around 9.1 GWh (33 TJ).

== Purpose ==
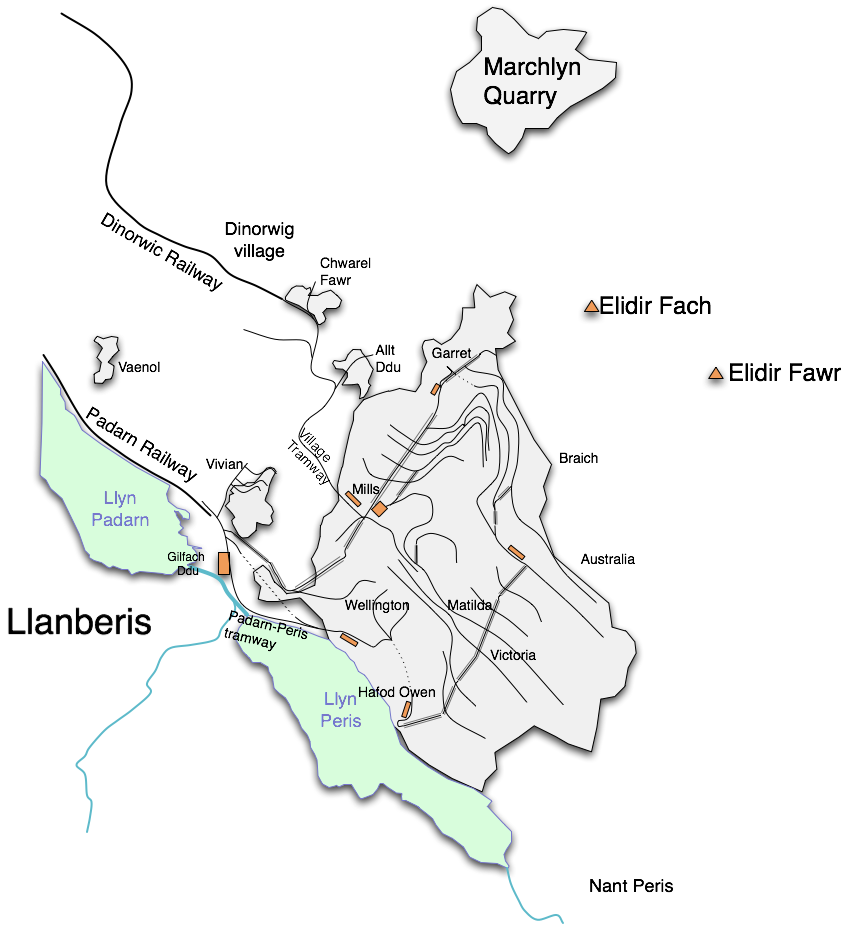
The Dinorwic Quarry, showing the major inclines, mills, levels and tramways, along with the Padarn Railway and Dinorwic Railway

The scheme was built at a time when responsibility for electricity generation in England and Wales was in the hands of the government's Central Electricity Generating Board (CEGB); with the purpose of providing peak capacity, very rapid response, energy storage and frequency control. Dinorwig's very rapid response capability significantly reduced the need to hold spinning reserve on part loaded thermal plant. When the plant was conceived the CEGB used low efficiency old coal and oil fired capacity to meet peaks in demand. More efficient 500 MW thermal sets were introduced in the 1960s, initially for baseload operation only. Dinorwig could store cheap energy produced at night by low marginal cost plant and then generate during times of peak demand, so displacing low efficiency plant during peak demand periods.

There were plans for a pumped storage facility near Exmoor but it was not built. With the increase of renewables such as wind and solar power, the need for storage is expected to increase to deal with intermittency. A 50 MW pumped storage facility at nearby Glyn Rhonwy in disused slate pits was approved in 2013, with an expected cost of £120 million. As of 2019, this project has reached the "detailed engineering design" stage.

Dinorwig is operated not only to help meet peak loads but also as a short term operating reserve (STOR), providing a fast response to short-term rapid changes in power demand or sudden loss of power stations. In a common scenario (known as TV pickup), the end of a popular national television programme or advertising breaks in commercial television programmes results in millions of consumers switching on electric kettles in the space of a few minutes, leading to overall demand increases of up to 2,800 MW.

== Financial case ==
In 2016, it was suggested that in Britain's open energy market the financial justification for pumped hydroelectric energy storage (PHES) was hard to quantify. Arbitrage allows PHES operators to charge high prices for energy supplied at short notice when demand is high but studies suggest that revenue from sales alone, even at peak prices, does not warrant the initial investment; projections for similar projects indicate a payback time of up to forty years. Additionally, however, Dinorwig PHES receives a steady income for maintaining a permanent on-call capacity for urgent frequency regulation; in 2016, this was approximately £10.8 million.

== Construction ==
The scheme was constructed under the terms of the North Wales Hydro Electric Power Act 1973. It was constructed in the abandoned Dinorwic slate quarry. To preserve the natural beauty of Snowdonia National Park, the power station itself is located deep inside the mountain Elidir Fawr, inside tunnels and caverns. The project – begun in 1974 and taking ten years to complete at a cost of £425 million – was the largest civil engineering contract ever awarded by the UK government at the time. The work was undertaken by an Alfred McAlpine / Brand / Zschokke consortium. Twelve million tonnes (12,000,000 long tons; 13,000,000 short tons) of rock had to be moved from inside the mountain, creating tunnels wide enough for two lorries to pass comfortably and an enormous cavern 51 m (167 ft) tall, 180 m (590 ft) long, and 23 m (75 ft) wide known as "the concert hall".

The power station is connected to the National Grid substation at Pentir by 400 kV cables that are buried for approximately 10 km (6 miles), rather than using transmission towers or pylons to transmit the electricity across an area of outstanding natural beauty.

== Specification ==
The power station comprises six 300 MW GEC generator/motors coupled to Francis-type reversible turbines. The generators are vertical-shaft, salient-pole, air-cooled units each having 12 electromagnetic poles weighing 10 tonnes each, producing a terminal voltage of 18 kV; synchronous speed is 500 rpm. From standstill, a single 450-tonne generator can synchronise and achieve full load in approximately 75 seconds. With all six units synchronised and spinning-in-air (water is dispelled by compressed air and the unit draws a small amount of power to spin the shaft at full speed), zero to 1800 MW load can be achieved in approximately 16 seconds. Once running, at full flow, the station can provide power for up to six hours before running out of water.

The energy storage capacity of the station is approximately 9.1 GWh. At peak output water flows through the generators at 390 cubic metres (86,000 imperial gallons; 100,000 US gallons) per second (about the volume of a 25 m (27-yard) swimming pool every second).

== Operation ==
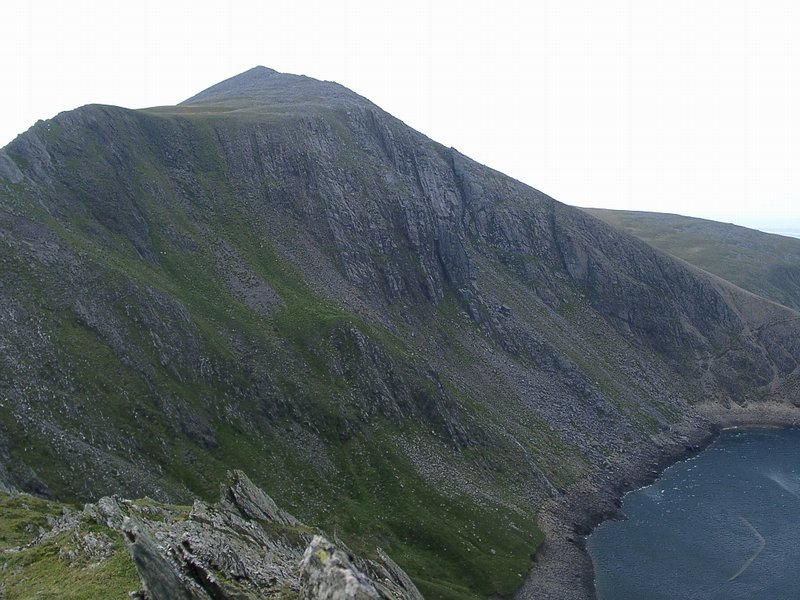
Elidir Fawr with Marchlyn Mawr at right

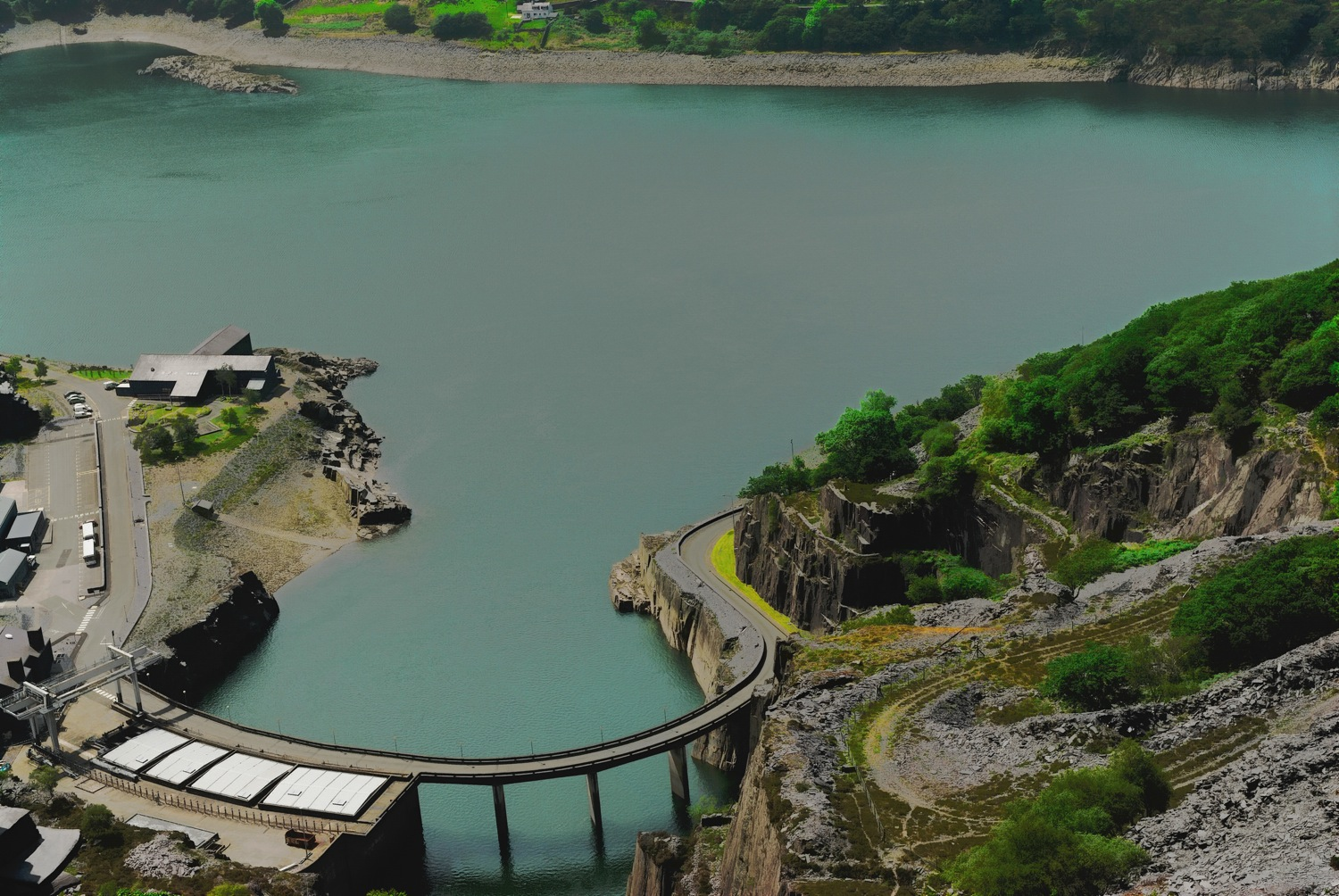
Looking down on the power station from the slate trail above

Water is stored at 636 m (2,087 ft) above sea level in Marchlyn Mawr reservoir. When power needs to be generated, water from the reservoir is sent down through the turbines into Llyn Peris, which is at approximately 100 m (330 ft). Water is pumped back from Llyn Peris to Marchlyn Mawr during off-peak times. Although it uses more energy to pump the water up than is generated on the way down, pumping is generally done when electricity is cheaper and generation when it is more expensive.

The plant runs on average at 74–76% efficiency. It fills an important need in the system by responding to sudden surges in electricity demand because of its rapid ability to deliver power on load spikes. One of the alternatives would be to have spare capacity from conventional power stations running part loaded ("spinning reserve"), hence at lower efficiency than otherwise, and thus capable of being rapidly run up to full load. Other forms of power plant compete in this market for reserve power such as gas turbines and diesel generators for the National Grid Reserve Service.

Excess water will overflow to Llyn Padarn and is then lost from the reservoir system. Both Llyn Peris and Llyn Padarn were ancestral homes to the Arctic char, a rare fish in the United Kingdom. When the scheme was commissioned, a fish rescue was undertaken to transfer the char from Llyn Peris to other local suitable lakes and it is believed that due to the very variable water levels in Llyn Peris, Arctic char are now absent from the lake.

== Tourism ==
The power station was also promoted as a tourist attraction, with visitors able to take a minibus trip from "Electric Mountain" – the name of its nearby visitor centre in Llanberis – to see the workings inside the power station; 132,000 people visited the attraction in 2015. In 2021, First Hydro Company announced that tours inside the power station would cease and the visitor centre would close, and then that the visitor centre would be demolished in 2023. However, they say 'The power station underneath Dinorwig Quarry remains a feat of engineering that is of national significance and we would hope to find an alternative, viable way, to showcase its operations in the future.'

== Future ==
As of 2025, the Dinorwig plant is approaching the end of its planned operational life, and the current majority owners, ENGIE, have announced a £1 billion investment project to replace the turbines and associated plant.

== See also ==
- Control of the National Grid
- Energy use and conservation in the United Kingdom
- Grid energy storage
- List of pumped-storage hydroelectric power stations
- List of energy storage projects
- Relative cost of electricity generated by different sources
