= Y Garn (Glyderau) =

Mountain in Wales

Coordinates: 53.11503°N 4.04837°W

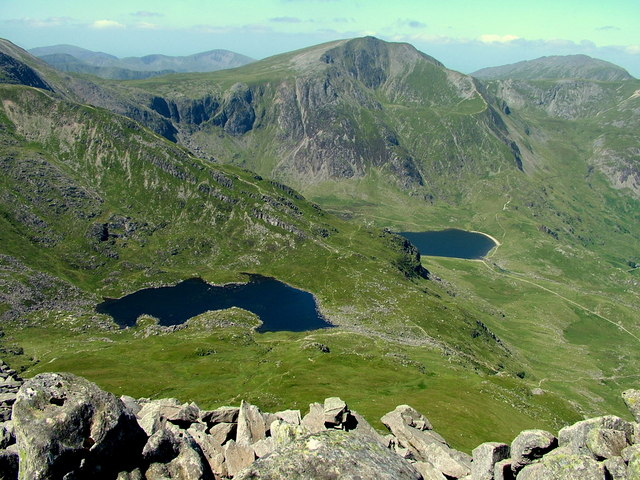
- Y Garn from Tryfan. Llyn Bochlwyd and Llyn Idwal are in the foreground, and Elidir Fawr to the right.

Highest point
- Elevation: 947 m (3,107 ft)
- Prominence: 236 m (774 ft)
- Parent peak: Glyder Fawr
- Listing: Marilyn, Hewitt, Welsh 3000s, Nuttall, Furth

Naming
- English translation: the cairn
- Language of name: Welsh
- Pronunciation: Welsh: [ə ˈɡarn]

Geography
- Location: Snowdonia, Wales
- OS grid: SH630595
- Topo map: OS Landranger 115

Listed summits of Y Garn (Glyderau)
Name	Grid ref	Height	Status
Foel-goch		831 m (2,726 ft)	Hewitt, Nuttall

Y Garn is a mountain in Snowdonia, North Wales, part of the Glyderau.

It is one of the Welsh 3000s — the 15 summits in Wales over 3,000 feet (914.4 metres) in height. It is the tenth-highest peak in Wales. Moderate snow accumulations can take place on the western-sloping side of the mountain from October to May.

The south-westerly side of the mountain slopes gently down to the Nant Peris valley. The other, north-easterly side is of a different character, consisting of two steep-sided cwms, Cwm Clyd and Cwm Cywion, and finally Llyn Idwal and Ogwen Cottage. Along the ridge to the north lies Elidir Fawr, while to the south-east is the top of the Twll Du and Glyder Fawr.

In 2011 three people were walking on Y Garn when they went over a cornice overhanging a ridge. About 50 metres of snow collapsed when the cornice gave way creating an avalanche and a person died when they fell 150 metres.

== See also ==
- Snowdon
