= Elidir Fawr =

Mountain in Wales

Coordinates: 53.13074°N 4.07603°W

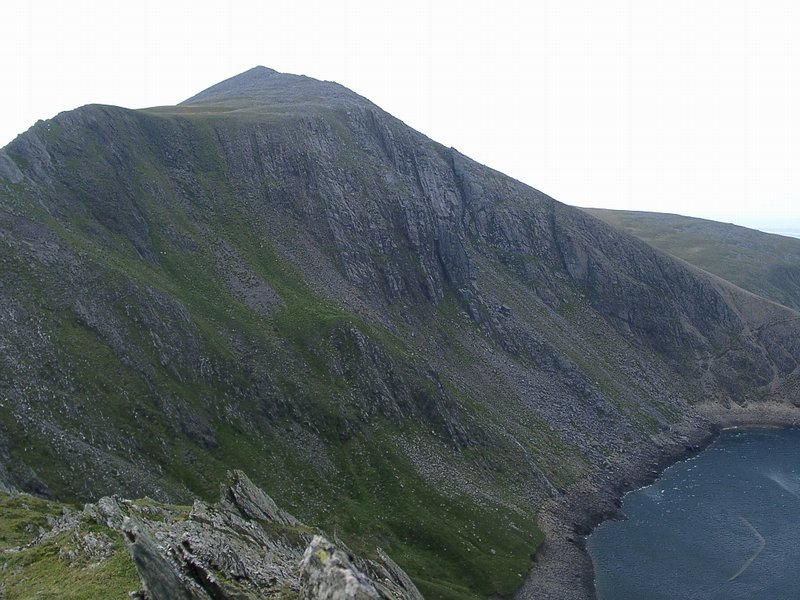
- Elidir Fawr from Mynydd Perfedd with Marchlyn Mawr below

Highest point
- Elevation: 924 m (3,031 ft)
- Prominence: 212 m (696 ft)
- Parent peak: Y Garn
- Listing: Marilyn, Hewitt, Welsh 3000s, Nuttall, Furth

Naming
- Pronunciation: Welsh: [ɛˈlɪdɪr ˈvau̯r]

Geography
- Location: Gwynedd, Wales
- Parent range: Snowdonia
- OS grid: SH612613
- Topo map: OS Landranger 115

Elidir Fawr is a mountain in Snowdonia, north Wales, the northernmost peak in the Glyderau. Its name means 'Big Elidir', named after a legendary warrior king of the 6th century also known as Eliffer Gosgorddfawr (Elidir of the Great Army).

To the north of the summit is a small lake, Marchlyn Mawr, which is the upper reservoir for Dinorwig power station, a pump-storage power station hidden inside the mountain. Water from this lake flows through huge tunnels into the lower reservoir Llyn Peris. From the north, Elidir Fawr is very prominent, and can appear to be higher than the higher mountains behind it. A subsidiary peak, Elidir Fach lies just to the west at 795 metres (2,608 feet).

== Slate quarries ==
From Llanberis, the mountain is dominated by the former Dinorwic slate quarries and the waste they have left behind.

== Approach ==
It is a reasonably short, but steep walk up to the summit, and this can be undertaken from the Deiniolen side or from Nant Peris. The Deiniolen walk provides views down to Llanberis, while the Nant Peris approach is short and quite steep. The summit can also be reached from Ogwen Cottage via a traverse of Y Garn and Foel-goch. The route makes its way around the headwall of Cwm Dudodyn to Bwlch y Brecan and up to the rocky summit of Elidir Fawr.

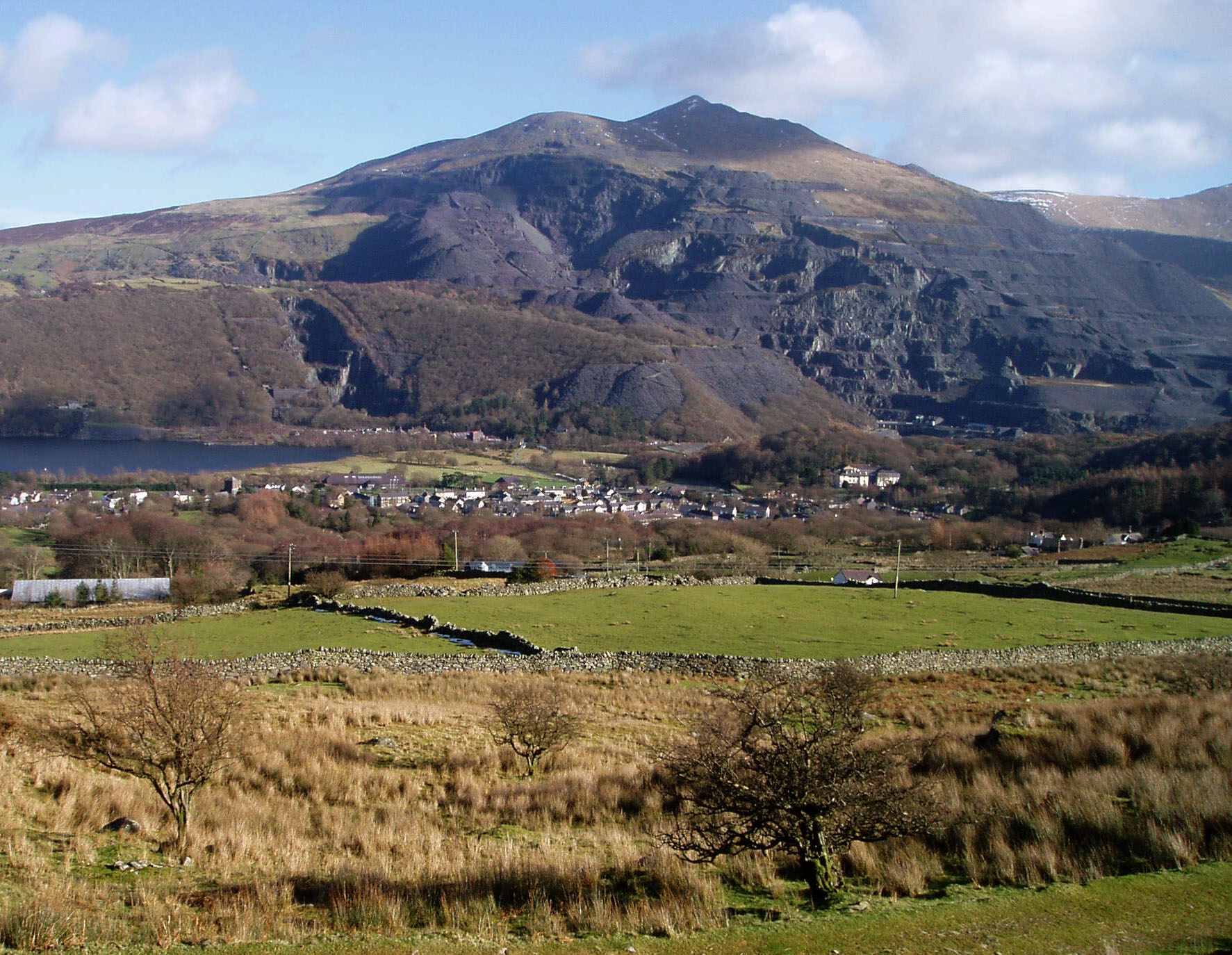
Elidir Fawr from the slopes of Moel Eilio, with the Dinorwic Quarry prominent on its south-west face.

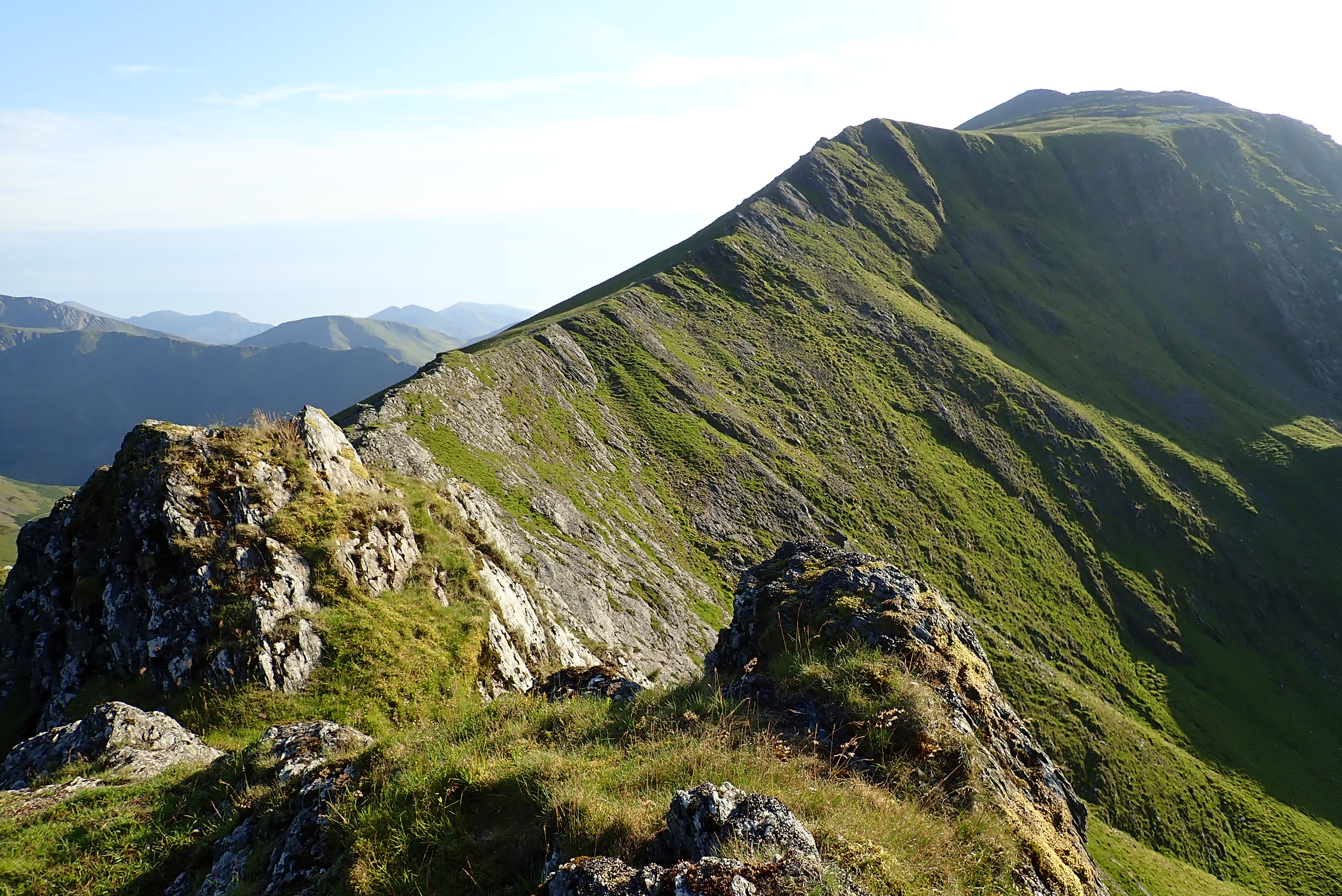
Elidir Fawr ridge, as seen from the ridge along Mynydd Perfedd, above the reservoir, with Moel Cynghorion in the background

Listed summits of Elidir Fawr
Name	Grid ref	Height	Status
Carnedd y Filiast	SH565469	821 m (2,694 ft)	Hewitt, Nuttall
Elidir Fach	SH603613	795 m (2,608 ft)	Unclassified
