= James Curnock =

English painter (1812–1862)

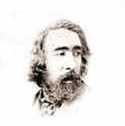
- James Curnock, portrait painter (1812-1862)
- Born: 1 January 1812; Bristol, Avon, England
- Died: 29 May 1862 (aged 50); Bristol
- Resting place: Arnos Vale Cemetery, Bristol
- Known for: Portrait painting
- Movement: Romanticism

James Curnock (1812-1862) was an English portrait painter renown in Bristol for his formal portraits of local dignitaries. His portraits were both of the traditional Victorian approach and the Romantic style.

== Biography ==
James Curnock lived in the Clifton area of Bristol and in 1837 he married Sarah Cuerock. They had a daughter, Isabel, in the same year, followed by James Jackson in 1839, Edith in 1845 and Alice in 1851. His son, James Jackson Curnock went on to become a famous landscape painter focusing his pictures, particularly on Wales and the south west of England. James Curnock died in Bristol in 1862.

== Artwork ==
Whilst Curnock was never as famous as other nineteenth century Victorian portrait painters, such as, John Everett Millais, he adopted a formal style that was very popular, especially with local families and signatories of Bristol and the south west of England. He also painted the anti-slavery campaigner, Rev. Thomas Roberts in 1840.

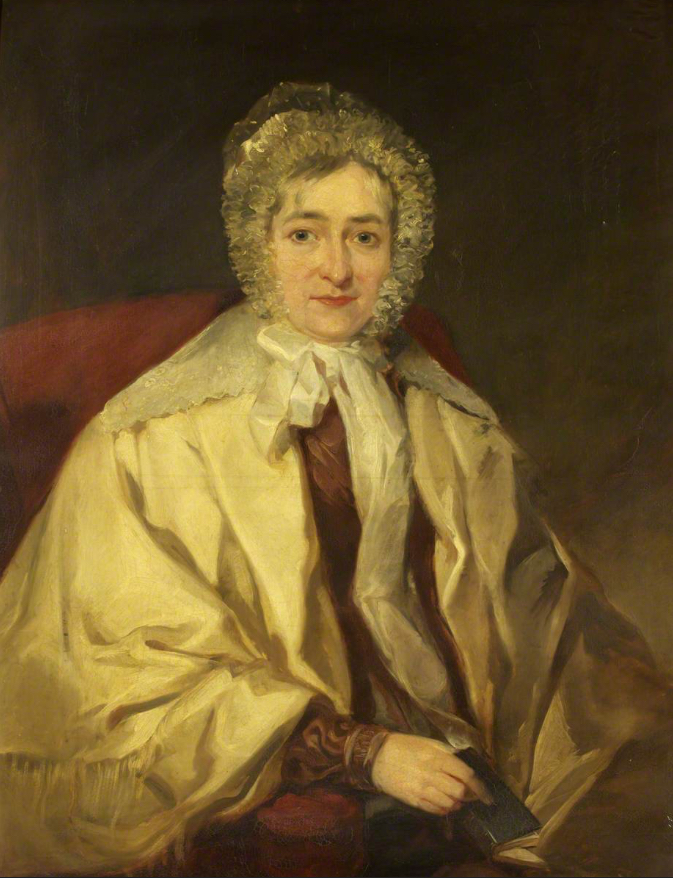
Mary Ann Cox painted by James Curnock circa 1840

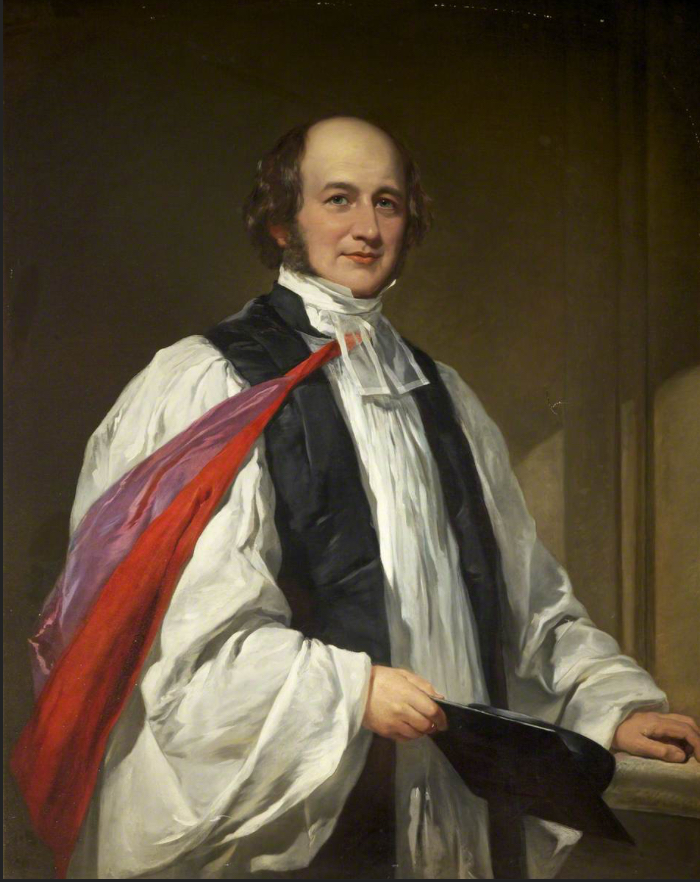
The Very Reverend Gilbert Elliot (1800–1891), Dean of Bristol (1850–1891) painted by James Curnock

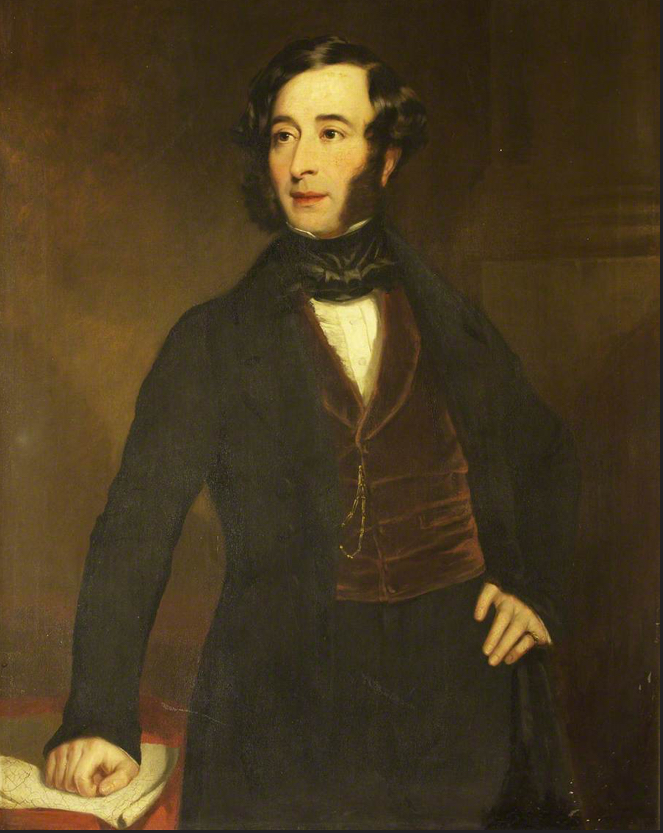
John George Shaw Esq., Mayor of Bristol (1853–55) painted by James Curnock

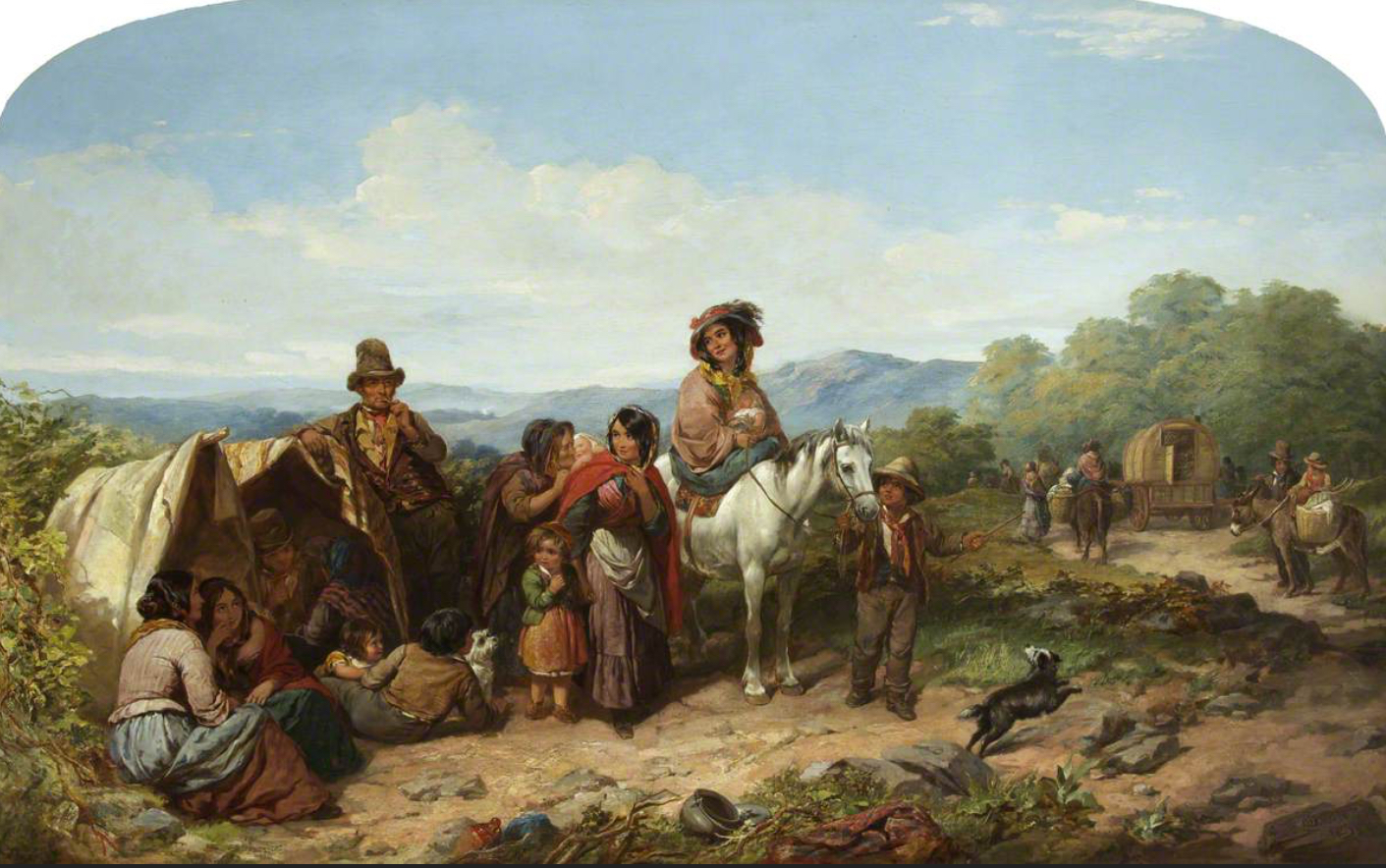
The Breaking up of the Camp painting by James Curnock
