= Marchlyn Mawr =

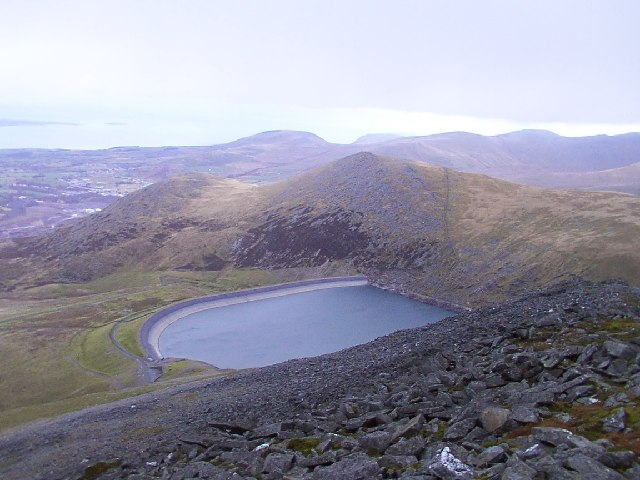

- Location within Gwynedd
- Location: Snowdonia, Wales
- Coordinates: 53°8′12″N 4°4′9″W
- Type: reservoir, former natural lake
- Basin countries: United Kingdom

Marchlyn Mawr reservoir is a high level lake in Snowdonia behind Elidir Fawr mountain. It is used as the high level water source for Dinorwig power station, a closed-loop pumped storage hydroelectric generating facility.

It is said that nearby lies the cave containing Arthur's treasure, a source of bedazzlement to the wanderer who sees it, and of disaster to the pilferer who touches it. The lake itself lies in between two mountains Carnedd y Filiast and Elidir Fawr and lies at a height of 636m above sea level. The reservoir took four years to build (from 1975 to 1979). The reservoir holds about 9.2 million cubic metres (320 million cubic feet) of water. From the reservoir, a 10.5-metre (34 ft) diameter tunnel runs for 1.7 km (1.1 miles) to a 10 m (33 ft) diameter vertical shaft. From the bottom of the shaft, a 9.45 m (31 ft) diameter tunnel leads to the power station, 670 metres (2,200 ft) away.

It is possible to cycle up the road to the reservoir but a gate at the bottom prevents cars from driving on the road.
