= Tryfan =

Mountain in northwest Wales

Coordinates: 53.11494°N 3.99753°W

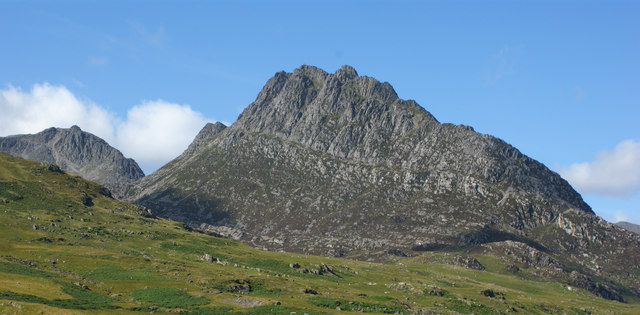

Highest point
- Elevation: 917.5 m (3,010 ft)
- Prominence: 191 m (627 ft)
- Parent peak: Glyder Fawr
- Listing: Marilyn Hewitt, Welsh 3000, Nuttall, Furth

Naming
- English translation: very high peak
- Language of name: Welsh

Geography
- Location: Conwy, Wales
- Parent range: Snowdonia
- OS grid: SH664593
- Topo map: OS Landranger 115 / Explorer OL17

Tryfan (Welsh pronunciation: [ˈtrəvan]) is a mountain in the Ogwen Valley, Snowdonia, Wales. It forms part of the Glyderau group, and is one of the most recognisable peaks in Britain, having a classic pointed shape with rugged crags. At 917.5 metres (3,010 feet) above sea level, it is the fifteenth-highest mountain in Wales. Tryfan was voted Britain's favourite mountain by Trail magazine.

Between the mid-1980s and June 2010, its accepted height was 915 metres (3,002 ft). However, it was resurveyed using accurate GPS measurements and found to be 2.4 metres (eight feet) higher (which the pre-1980s surveys also recorded).

Tryfan is said to be the final resting-place of Sir Bedivere (Bedwyr) of Arthurian legend.

== Naming ==
The name "Tryfan" is thought to derive from the intensifying particle try– and the noun ban (‘top, peak’), giving the meaning ‘very high peak’.

== Routes of ascent ==
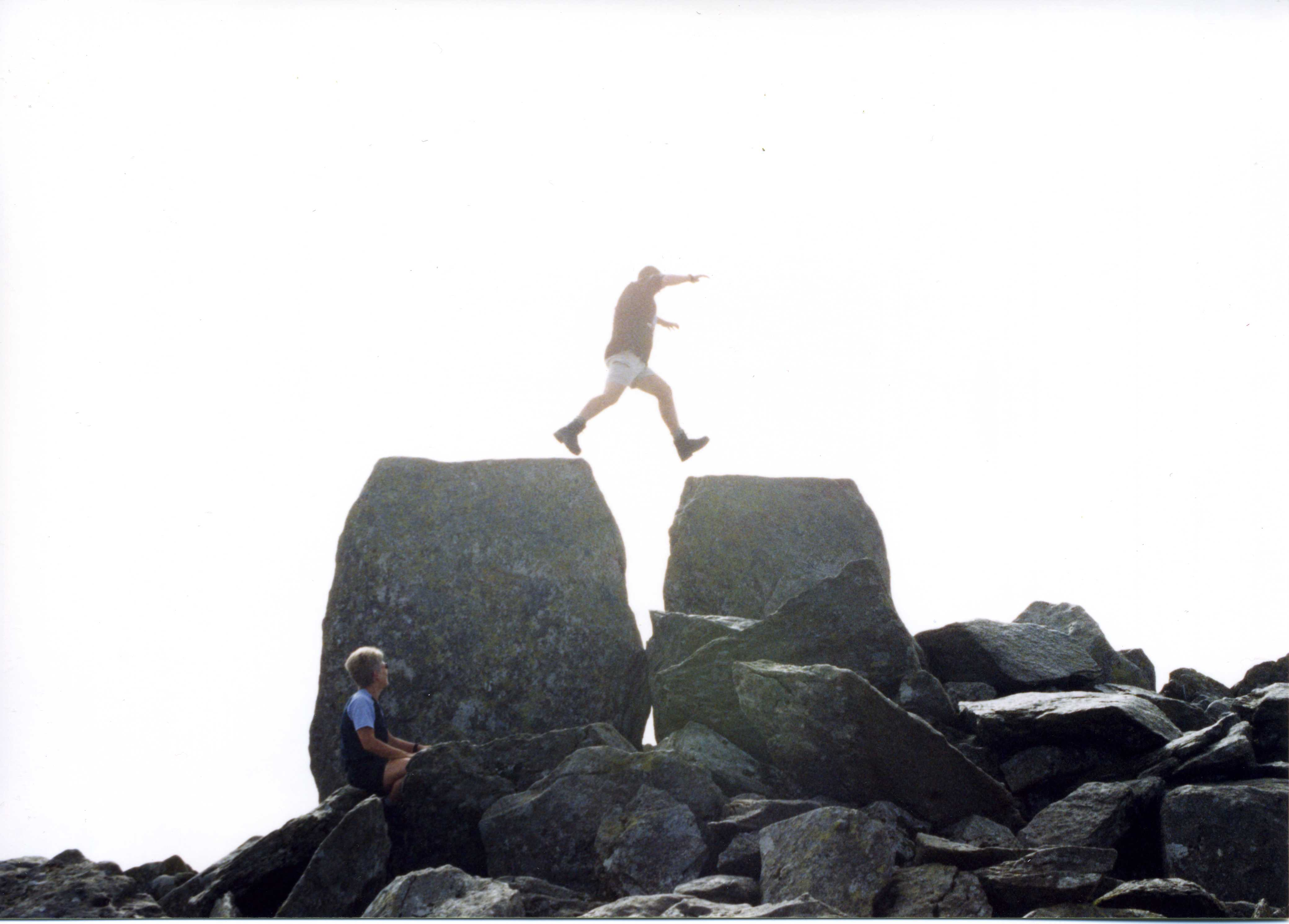
Jumping from monoliths Siôn a Siân at the summit of Tryfan.

There are many routes of ascent, ranging from easy ridge scrambling, to multi-pitch mountaineering rock climbs on the east face.

A popular ascent route is its north ridge, which starts close to the A5 road, about one mile (1.6 km) east of Idwal Cottage (a youth hostel) or Ogwen Cottage (an outdoor pursuits centre). From here a route leads directly up the ridge, a Grade 1 scramble by the easiest line. The difficulty can be increased considerably if the most direct line is followed throughout; particularly in the upper sections of the ridge. About a third of the way up there is a distinctive rock known as "The Cannon" which points upwards at 45 degrees and is visible from the valley.

Tryfan may also be climbed by the south ridge, which links the mountain (via Bristly Ridge) to Glyder Fach. The route begins at Bwlch Tryfan, the col between Tryfan and Bristly Ridge. The col is reached by a path leading up from Idwal Cottage to the west, passing through Cwm Bochlwyd. This cwm contains Llyn Bochlwyd.

The summit of Tryfan is famous for the twin monoliths of Siôn a Siân (Adam and Eve in English), a pair of rocks some three metres (10') high and separated by 1.2 metres (3.9 ft). The rocks are visible from the Ogwen valley. Those who tackle the "step" between the two rocks are said to gain the "Freedom of Tryfan". However, the exposure on one side is quite great, and mountain writer Frank Showell Styles said: "In calm dry weather it is not too hard a step but the penalties of failure are unpleasant in the extreme."

Two prominent pillar-like boulders are visible on the skyline midway through the approach to the summit via the South ridge. As these can be mistaken for Siôn a Siân from a distance, they have become known as Cain and Abel, continuing the biblical theme.

== Milestone Buttress ==
Milestone Buttress (Craig Y Foty) at the base of Tryfan is a popular location for climbing. The Buttress is about 10 minutes' walk from roadside laybys. The most popular route is known as the Direct Route: there are often queues of people waiting to climb it. It is 75 metres (246 ft) long, and has a grade of Very Difficult (VD). The route was first climbed by G. Barlow and H. Priestly-Smith in 1910. There is also a popular Grade 3 scramble incorporating the Milestone Buttress. This route is commonly used as an alternative approach to the North Ridge, as is the nearby slabby wedge of Tryfan Bach, on the other side of the mountain.

== Gallery ==
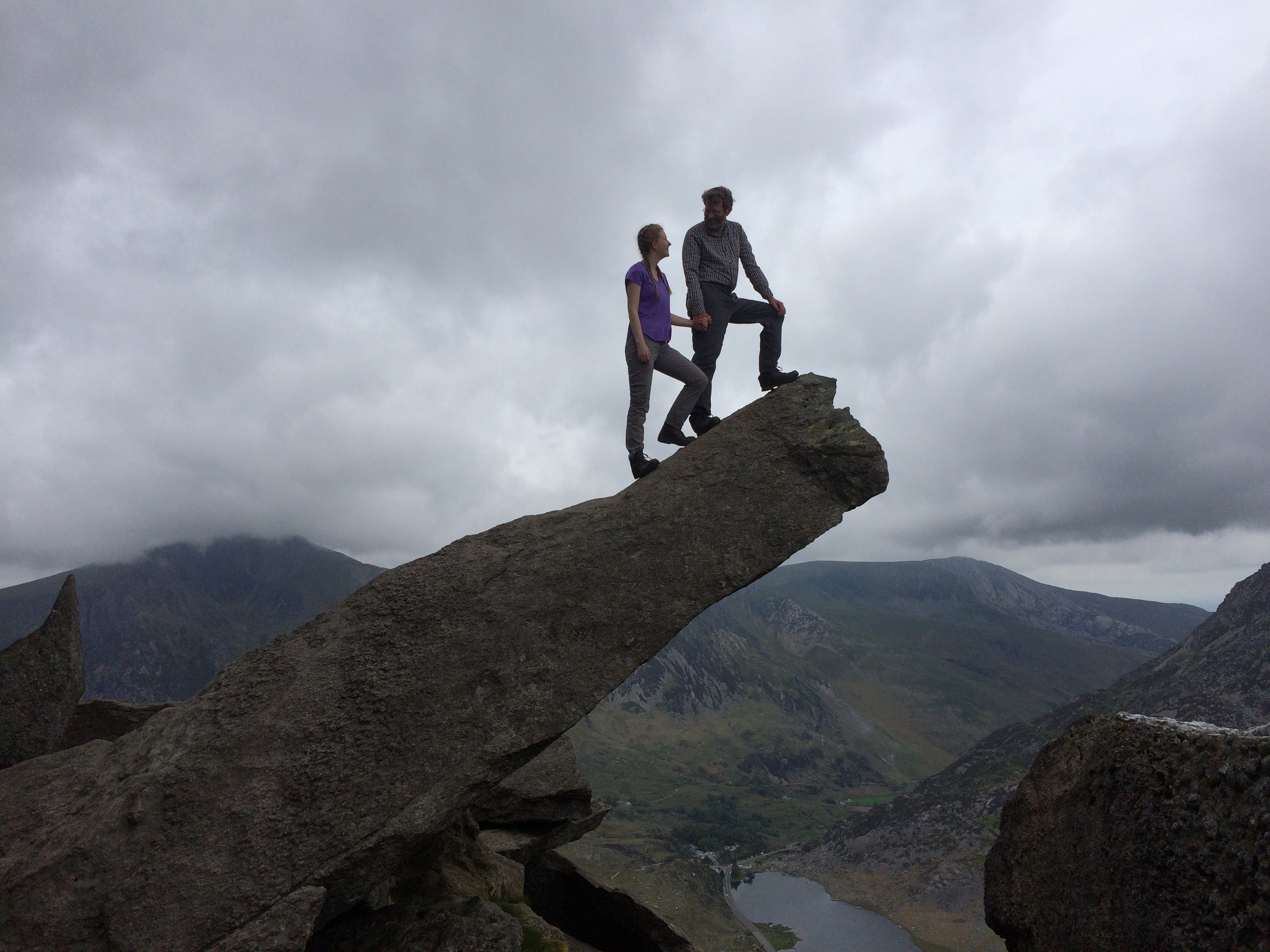
The Cannon Stone, on Tryfan's north ridge.

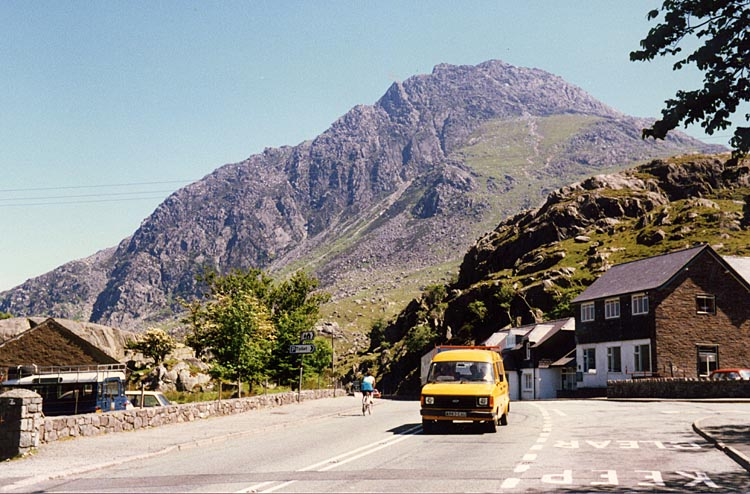
Tryfan seen from Ogwen Cottage on the A5 road.

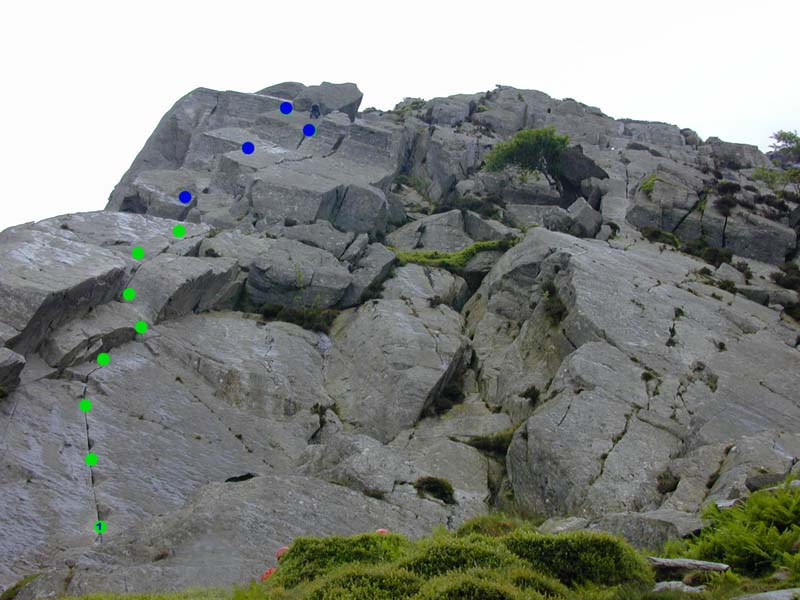
Milestone Buttress, eastern side. The direct route is highlighted.

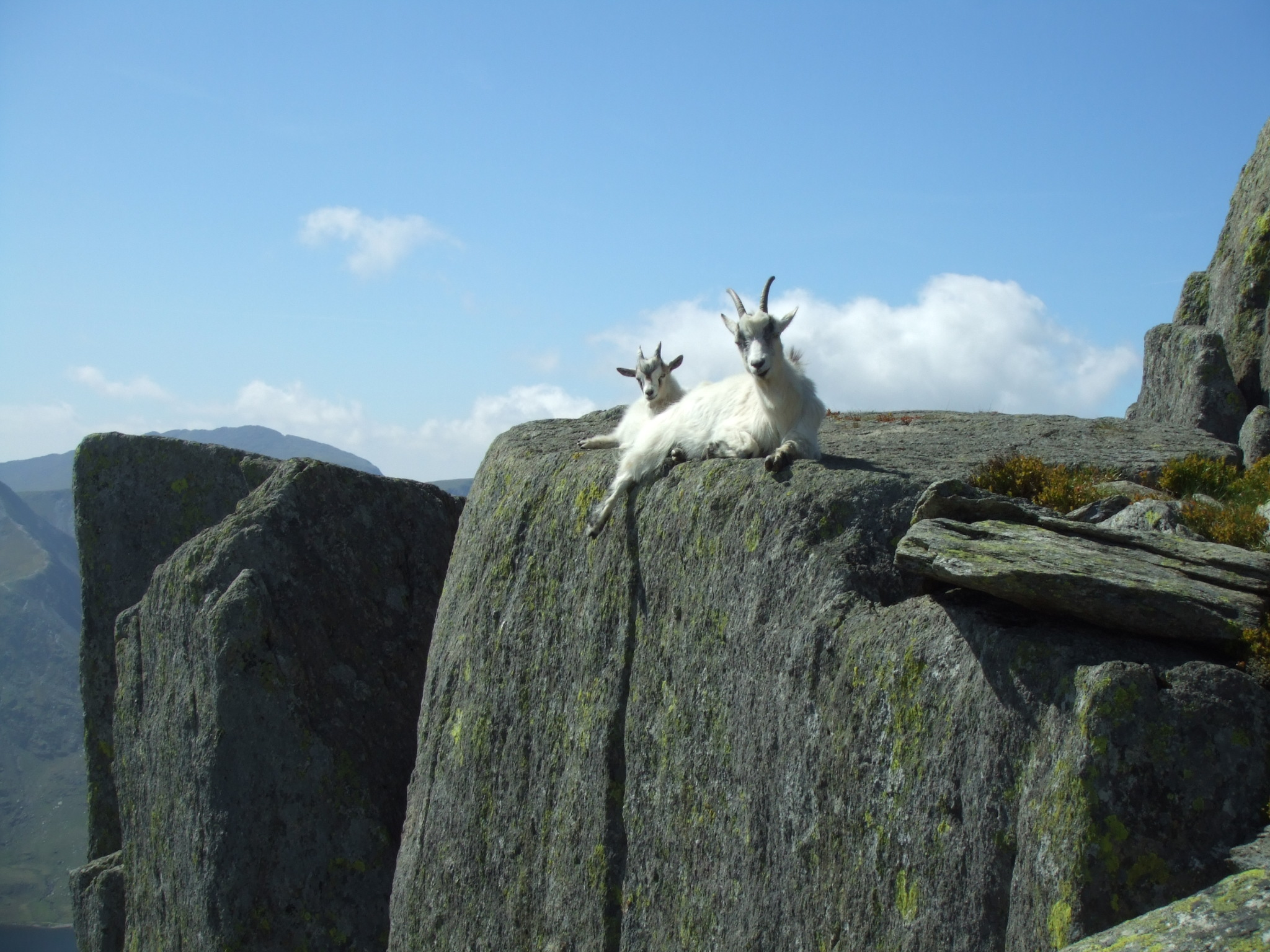
Tryfan and neighbouring parts of the Glyderau are home to feral goats.

== Bibliography ==
- Williams, Paul (1990). Rock climbing in Snowdonia. Constable. ISBN 0-09-468410-3.
- Ashton, Steve (1992). Scrambles in Snowdonia. Cicerone. ISBN 1-85284-088-9.
