= Nant Ffrancon Pass =

Mountain pass in north Wales

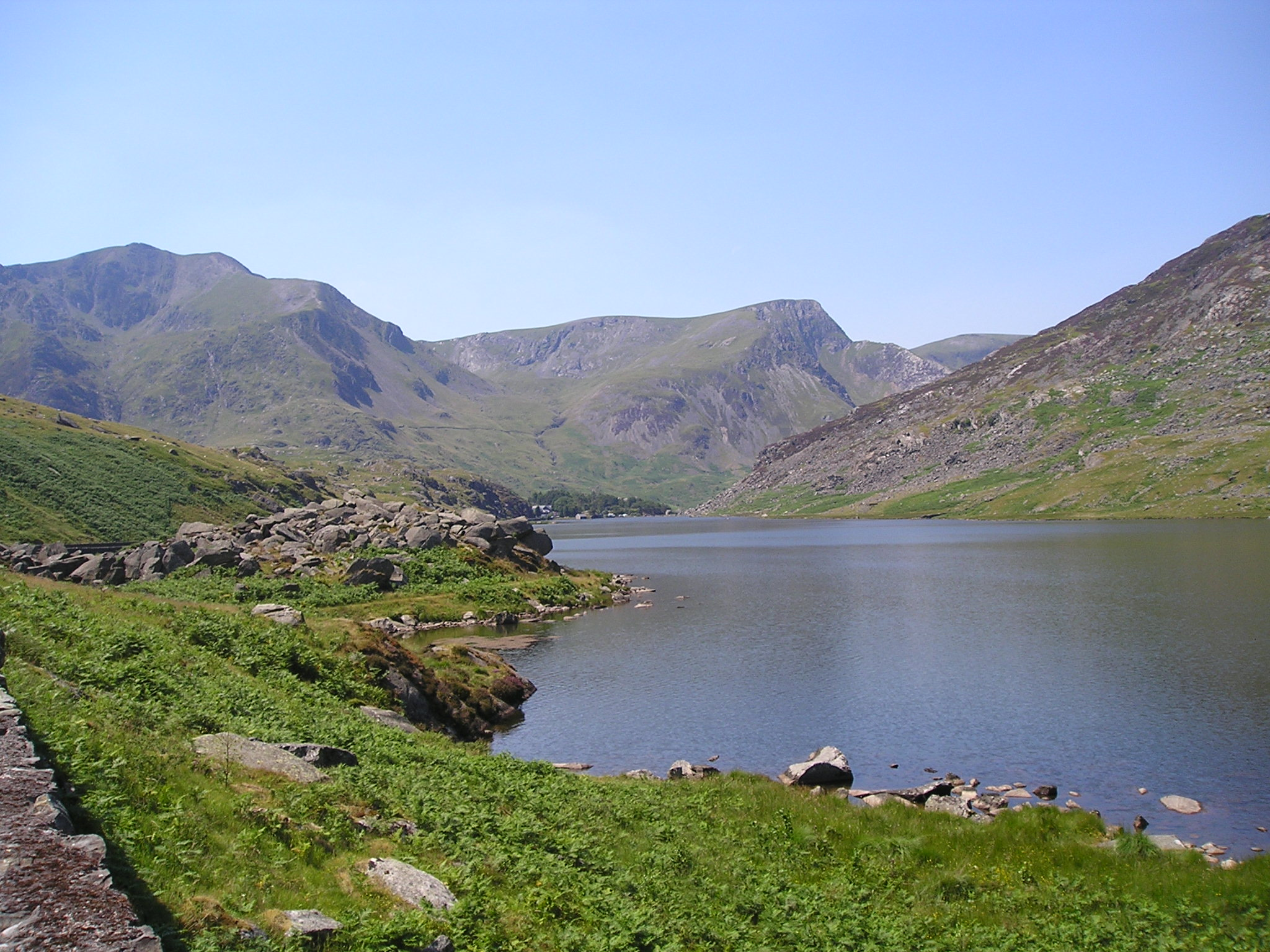
- Llyn Ogwen (near the summit of the Nant Ffrancon Pass), taken from the A5.
- Interactive map of Nant Ffrancon Pass
- Elevation: 312 metres (1,024 ft)
- Traversed by: A5 road

Third Approach
- Location: Snowdonia, North Wales
- Range: Glyderau and Carneddau
- Coordinates: 53°07′28″N 4°01′13″W

The Nant Ffrancon Pass (Welsh: Bwlch Nant Ffrancon) in Snowdonia, North Wales is at 312 metres (1,024 ft) at Pont Wern-gof, about one-third of a mile beyond the eastern end of Llyn Ogwen. The A5 road crosses it between Llyn Ogwen and Bethesda, Gwynedd.

== Geography ==
Nant Ffrancon itself is a steep-sided glacial valley dropping to Bethesda between the Glyderau and the Carneddau. The valley starts in Cwm Idwal, carrying water from Llyn-y-Cwn through Twll Du and Llyn Idwal to join the Ogwen Valley below the Ogwen Falls on Afon Ogwen.

== Road ==
The A5 road makes a long steady climb between Bethesda, Gwynedd, and Llyn Ogwen in Conwy. From here the road descends through Nant y Benglog to Capel Curig and through to Betws-y-Coed.

The A5 is the Holyhead to London trunk road. The original road through the Nant Ffrancon was constructed by Lord Penrhyn in the late 18th century. Lord Penrhyn's road, largely followed the valley floor, and at Capel Curig in 1801 he built a coaching inn, which is now Plas y Brenin, the UK National Mountaineering Centre.

Thomas Telford re-engineered it between 1810 and 1826. Telford carved much of his road out of the north-eastern slopes of the Nant Ffrancon, thereby encountering difficulties in construction and future maintenance. But this enabled him to observe a maximum grade of 1 in 14 along the whole route from London to Holyhead in order to facilitate horse drawn mail coaches throughout.

== In popular culture ==
It has been used as a filming location for British film-makers, including

- the Carry On film Carry On up the Khyber doubling for the Khyber Pass
- the Doctor Who serial The Abominable Snowmen doubling for the Himalayas
- the 1950s film The Inn of the Sixth Happiness.

Nant Ffrancon Golf Club (now defunct) appeared in the late 1920s/30s. The club was wound up in 1936.
