= Welsh 1000 m Peaks Race =

Annual running race in Snowdonia, Wales

Coordinates: 53.1479°N 4.0007°W

The Welsh 1000m Peaks Race takes place on the first Saturday in June each year. The 32 km route is also known as the Snowdonia Summits Marathon as competitors have to reach the top of all the 1000 metre peaks in Wales.

- Carnedd Llewelyn 1064m (3491 feet)
- Carnedd Dafydd 1044m (3425 feet)
- Glyder Fawr 1001m (3281 feet)
- Garnedd Ugain 1065m (3493 feet) and
- Snowdon (Yr Wyddfa) 1085m (3560 feet)

Runners also have to pass through several other checkpoints; this gives a total of around 8000 feet of ascent for competitors. In previous years only the lower slopes of the Glyderau would be crossed, however in September 2010, the summit of Glyder Fawr was remeasured at 1001m.The organisers of the race included this summit from 2011. It is a tough endurance event and required navigational skills.

The idea was the brainchild of Ron James, the warden of Ogwen Cottage Outdoor Pursuits Centre, along with Dr Ieuan Jones, who invited 60 people to participate in a trial event in 1970. The first race proper was held in 1971 with men starting from the shoreline at Abergwyngregyn, on the shoreline of Conwy Bay, and ladies from the Ogwen Valley. Both finished on the summit of Snowdon after which entrants were still responsible for their own safety and descent to the valley. The early events were for mountaineers, with kit checks to ensure boots were adequate & rucksacks a certain minimum weight, and groups such as West Bromwich Mountaineering Club participated every year. The Army supported the whole event, providing checkpoints throughout the route. Later a Fell running class was introduced and a team event. The Gorphwysfa Club took over the race organisation from the military in the 1990s. The fastest times are 3h 27m 20s recorded by Gavin Bland in 1999 and, for women, 4h 2m 39s by Angela Mudge also in 1999. The record for the team event (the accumulated times of the 3 best finishers) is 13h 41m 56s set in 1996 by the Reserves team of the Royal Regiment of Wales. The event is currently sponsored by the First Hydro Company.

== See also ==
Welsh 3000s
