= Ron James (mountaineer) =

Ron James MBE was a British mountaineer, rock climber, and writer who was a co-founder of the Ogwen Cottage Mountain School in Snowdonia, North Wales in the UK. Born in January 1933, he died in March 2023 aged 90.

James was an accomplished rock climber with over 40 first ascents in North Wales. Many of these routes became classics, including Grey Arete, Glyder Fawr, Meshach and The Plum at Tremadog. In the Alps his favourite area was the Dolomites, which he visited every year for 40 years.

James was a qualified IFMGA (International Federation of Mountain Guides Associations) Mountain Guide (Honoured, Retired) and he served as president of the British Association of Mountain Guides. He was a member of the Climbers Club from 1959 and of the Alpine Club from 1974.

James played a pivotal role in setting up Ogwen Cottage as an outdoor pursuits centre. In 1959, he and two friends bought an old guest house beside Llyn Ogwen and set up Ogwen Cottage Mountain School. They ran a wide variety of mountain-based courses ranging from weekends for families to a month-long course for the Special Air Service.

In 1964 James was a co-founder of the Ogwen Valley Mountain Rescue Organisation. He was an honorary member of the team and in 1971 was awarded a Certificate for Distinguished Service in Mountain Rescue.

In 1964 the City of Birmingham took over Ogwen Cottage which became Ogwen Cottage Outdoor Pursuits Centre. James was Head of the centre for five years and then he was appointed Principal Lecturer and Head of Outdoor Education at I.M.Marsh College of Physical Education, now part of John Moores University in Liverpool. The Environmental Education certificate course evolved into a B.Ed. Honours course. Later a full-time Advanced Diploma in Outdoor Education for graduate teachers was developed. James held this position at John Moores from 1969 to 1985

In 1985, James retired to North Wales. He joined the Ramblers Association and led walks and assisted with navigation courses. In the 2009 Queens Birthday Honours list he was awarded the Order of the British Empire for services to mountaineering.

== Writing ==
Dolomites West and East published by the Alpine Club 2005 is an update of the 1988 Dolomites Selected Climbs. It is a major rewrite of the 1988 edition with many new routes and areas as well as a section on sport climbing areas. Ron climbed many areas of the Italian Dolomites for over 30 years.

Rock Climbing in Wales (First edition 1970) was a climbing guide to Snowdonia and its five centres: The Ogwen Valley, The Llanberis Pass, Beddgelert, Dolwyddelan and Holyhead Mountain. The book detailed 200 climbs chosen by the author, after 30 years' experience. The book had three editions.

== TV series ==
In 1974 Ron was involved in the production of the 10 programmes BBC TV series "Rockface", an instructional guide to rock climbing. Produced the book "Rockface" to accompany the series.
