= Glyder Fawr =

Mountain in Snowdonia, Wales

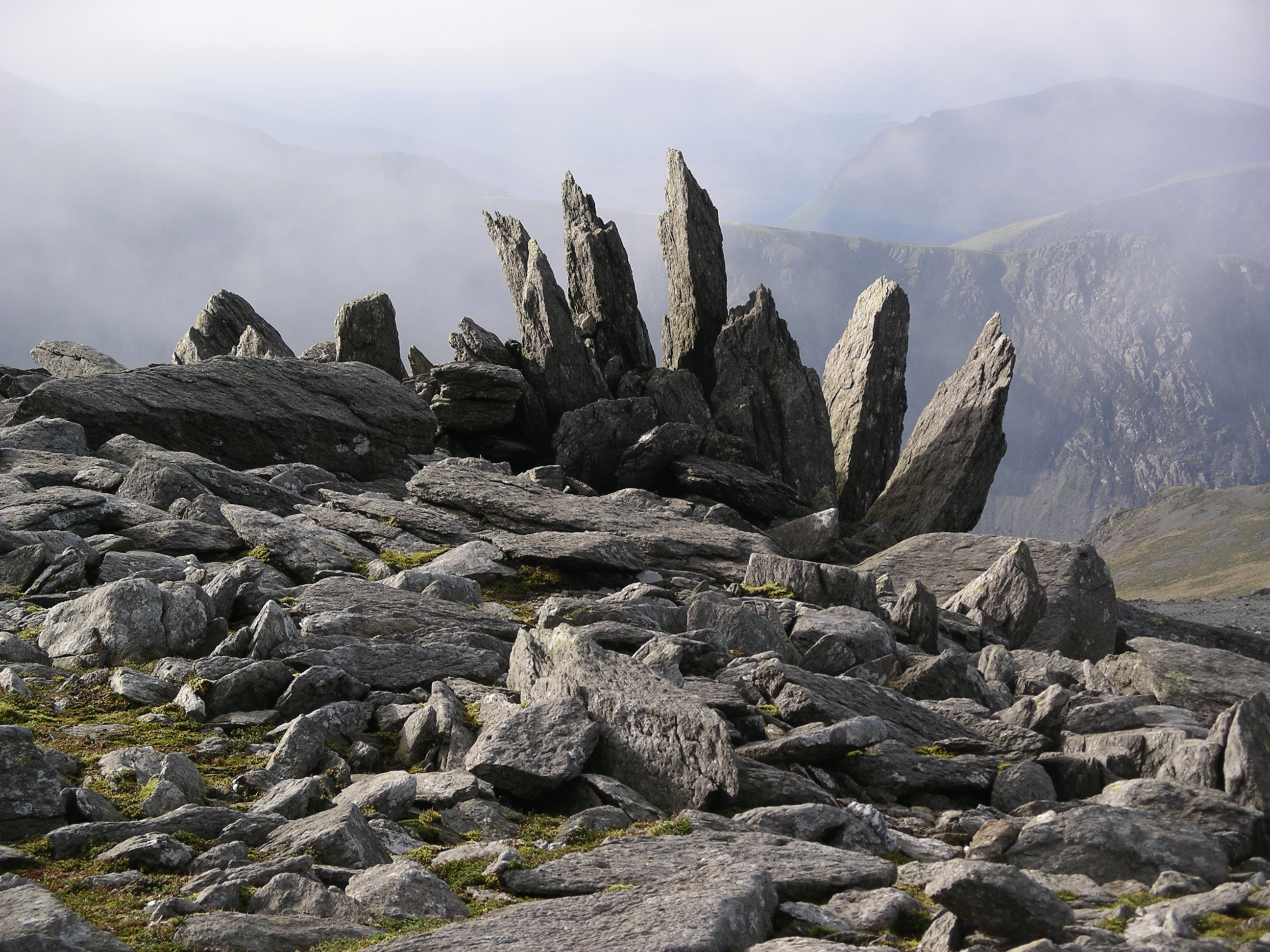
- Rocky outcrop near the summit of Glyder Fawr

Highest point
- Elevation: 1,001 m (3,284 ft)
- Prominence: 642 m (2,106 ft)
- Parent peak: Snowdon
- Listing: Marilyn, Hewitt, Welsh 3000s, Nuttall, Furth
- Coordinates: 53°06′03″N 4°01′47″W

Naming
- English translation: Big Lump
- Language of name: Welsh
- Pronunciation: Welsh: [ˈɡlɪdɛr ˈvau̯r]

Geography
- Location: Gwynedd / Conwy, Wales
- Parent range: Snowdonia
- OS grid: SH642579
- Topo map: OS Landranger 115 / Explorer OL17

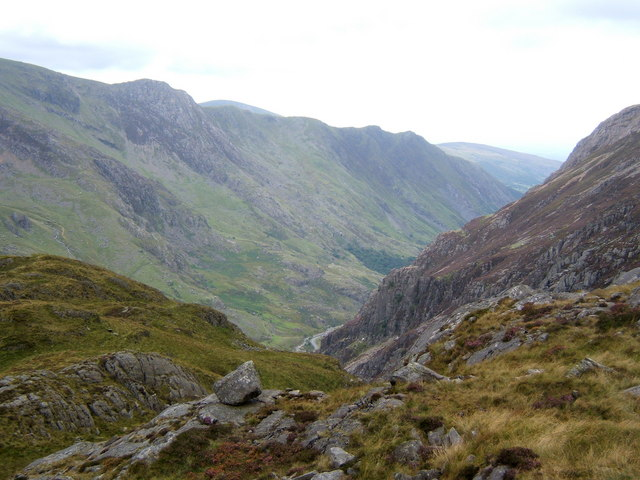
Glyder Fawr viewed from the southwest, with the Nant Peris Valley

Glyder Fawr is a mountain in Snowdonia, Wales, the highest peak in the Glyderau range at just over 1,000 metres. It is the fifth-highest mountain in Wales and has several walking and scrambling routes leading to its summit. According to Sir Ifor Williams, the word "Glyder" derives from the Welsh word "Gludair", meaning a heap of stones.

== Geography ==
Glyder Fawr is part of the Glyderau mountain range which lies to the northeast of the Snowdon massif, separated from that mountain by the Llanberis Pass and the Nant Peris valley. Going from west to east, the Glyderau range consists of Elidir Fawr (924 m or 3,031 ft), Y Garn (947 m or 3,107 ft), Glyder Fawr (1,001 m or 3,284 ft), Glyder Fach (994 m or 3,261 ft) and Tryfan (918 m or 3,012 ft). To the north of the range lie the Carneddau, separated from the Glyderau by the Ogwen Valley and the Nant Ffrancon Valley. The Glyderau are separated from the surrounding mountain ranges, making them stand out clearly from afar and giving them commanding views of the surrounding peaks and valleys.

Until late 2010, most maps showed the height of Glyder Fawr to be 999 metres (3,278 ft); however, the mountain was resurveyed with accurate GPS equipment and its height was found to be 1,000.8 m (3,283 ft 6 in). A spokesman from the Snowdonia National Park Authority was pleased by the new height, and suggested that now the mountain exceeded 1,000 m, it was sure to attract more walkers to the area.

The Glyderau range was formed about five hundred million years ago, when two land masses collided, causing the Snowdonia massif to rise up. Since then, wind, water and frost, and the advance and retreat of glaciers during the ice ages have gradually worn down the mountains to their present proportions. The underlying rock is a mixture of volcanic and sedimentary material. The ice sheet of the most recent ice age retreated about ten thousand years ago leaving Cwm Idwal as an example of a cirque. The ice scarred the surrounding cliffs, hollowed out the bed of Llyn Idwal and dumped rocks and other material that formed moraines at its foot. Massive boulders and shattered rocks crashed down from above to form the boulder fields and screes visible today.

== Routes to the summit ==
The summit can be accessed from several directions: one route starts at Ogwen Cottage on the shores of Llyn Idwal and approaches the mountain from the north; another starts at Pen-y-Pass and approaches it from the south; another possibility is to approach it from the east along the ridge from Glyder Fach. Although there is much shattered stone near the summit of Glyder Fach, the ridge between the two summits is fairly level and easy going. A scrambling, circuit route encompasses the three summits of Tryfan, Glyder Fach and Glyder Fawr and takes six or seven hours. One of the most popular routes from Ogwen Cottage follows the shore of Llyn Idwal to the base of the famous Rhiwiau Caws (Idwal Slabs) rock climbing crag, it then makes its way out of the cwm via the steep Twll Du path, arriving at a small lake called Llyn Y Cŵn. From here a steep scree path ascends the western shoulder to the summit of Glyder Fawr.

== Management ==
The National Trust took over the management of the Glyderau and the Carneddau in 1951 in lieu of death duties on the Penrhyn Estate. The total area is about 7,000 hectares, half of which is common land with registered grazing rights for 45,000 sheep and 741 ponies. There are eight tenanted farms on the estate, and the National Trust is responsible for the maintenance of footpaths and drystone walls, some of which date back many hundreds of years. The two mountain ranges form part of the Snowdonia National Park.
