= West Bromwich Mountaineering Club =

West Bromwich Mountaineering Club (WBMC) is one of the oldest and most active climbing and hill-walking clubs in the West Midlands. It meets at "The Red Lion" in All Saints Way, West Bromwich on Thursday nights, where from October to April it holds a series of illustrated mountaineering talks on the second Thursday of the month. It has a membership of around 200 and every month runs a coach to a mountainous region in England or Wales, on which seats are available to its members and the general public on a 'first come - first served' basis and also maintains a members-only hut in the Nant Gwynant valley. It affiliated to the British Mountaineering Council in 2003 and became a Community Association Sports Club (CASC) in 2005.

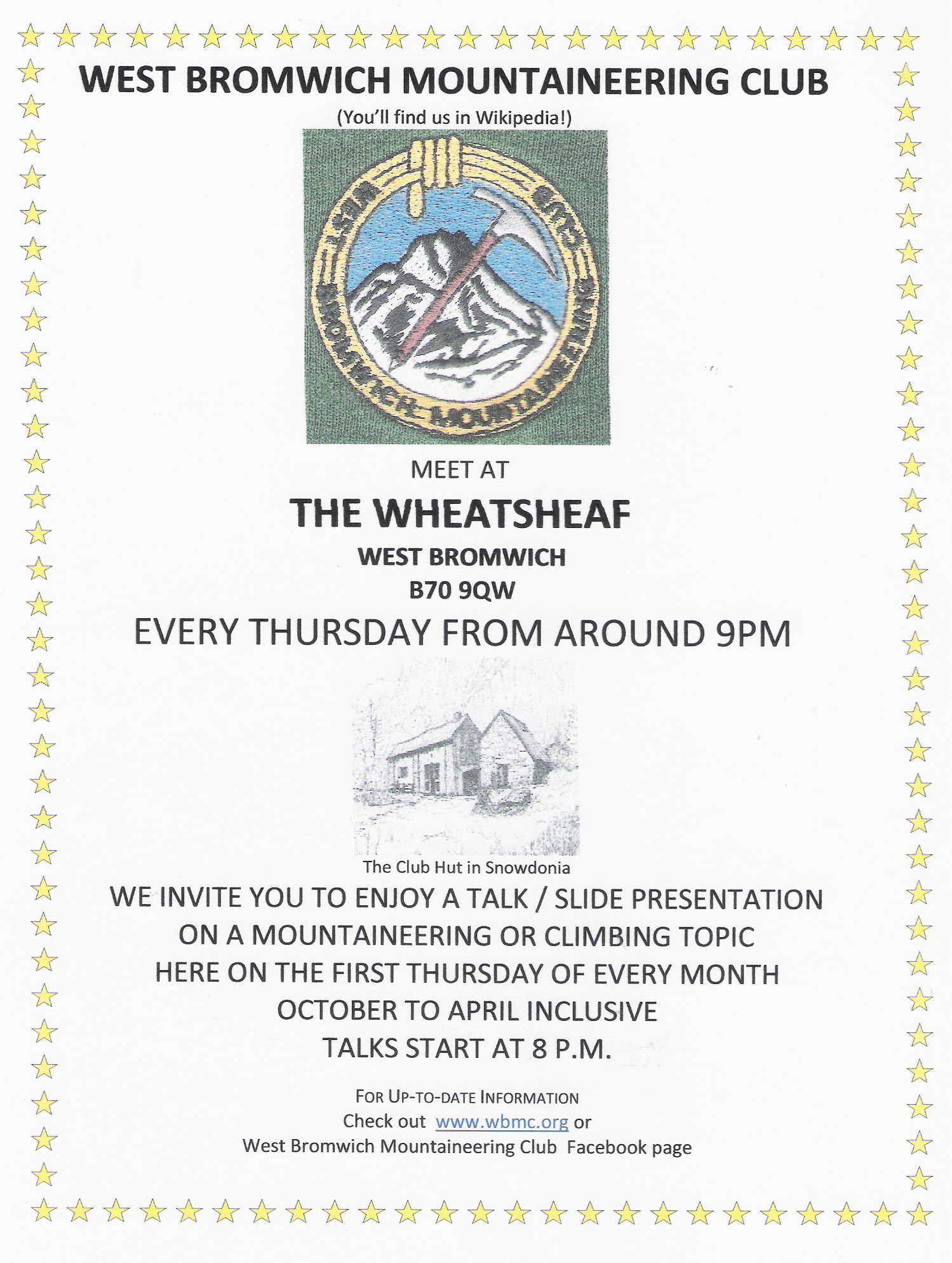
Poster produced when the Club met at a different venue in West Bromwich

== History ==
Early in 1951 Bert Wright, a member of the Climbers' Club, was asked by his Local Education Authority to develop camping trips & outdoor activities for local schoolchildren. At that time there were only 3 outdoor centres in the whole country and no certificates of mountain leadership of any kind, so he set about organising mountaineering courses for schoolteachers based at Helyg and Ynys Ettws huts in Snowdonia. The idea of forming a mountaineering club in West Bromwich materialised while participants socialised at The Royal Hotel (now Plas y Brenin) and the Pen-y-Gwryd. The first meet was to the Long Mynd on 13 January 1952, the first committee meeting on 23 May and the inaugural Annual General Meeting held at the Arden Hotel on 16 October 1952, at which Wright became the first chairman. The "Star and Garter" was the club's first home until it moved to "The Globe" in 1959 where it remained until September 2012 apart from brief spells at "The Flowerpot" and "Merry Go Round". It then moved to "The Wheatsheaf" in the town centre and then at "The Horse & Jockey" & "The Cricketer's Arms" in 2019. WBMC moved to its current Thursday night "home" and Desi pub "The Red Lion" in All Saints Road in 2021. In 2002 the Club celebrated its Golden Jubilee and Sir Chris Bonington contributed the forward to a book "The First Fifty Years" that was published that year to celebrate this achievement. The group produces a newsletter (currently bi-monthly) and copies of these going back to 1989 have been deposited with Sandwell Community History and Archives Service at Smethwick Library and can be consulted there. The Club's website www.wbmc.org received a major revamp in 2024.

== Coach meets ==
In the early days the mainstay of the club's activities was rock climbing in Snowdonia, and as few members owned cars, it was important for the club to be able to offer convenient travel to hills in other parts of the UK. So the monthly coach meet was born, typically setting off from West Bromwich at 6:30 am and picking up at 8 to 12 places en route to north or mid Wales, the Peak District or the Malvern Hills. With no M6 the Lake District was out of the question for a day trip then as it was usually after midnight before the coach returned to the West Midlands. Reports on some of these coach meets can be found on the internet. To maximise the amount of time on the hills the pick-up arrangements were altered in the 1990s, and the coach now leaves West Bromwich at 7:00 am with just one extra pick-up on the M6 or M54, enabling it to return passengers to the West Brom at around 10 pm. Coach meets now usually alternate between Snowdonia and the Lake District but South Wales and the Pennines are also visited.

== Club hut ==
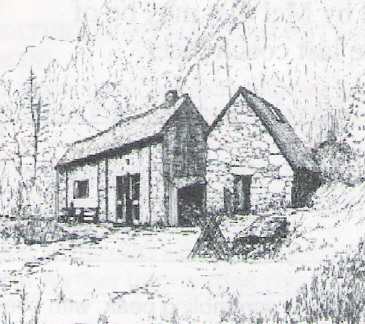
WBMC Hut in Snowdonia

In December 1957 West Bromwich (now Sandwell) Education Authority bought Plas Gwynant, one-time home of prime minister Sir Henry Campbell-Bannerman, together with its outbuildings for less than £5,000. The Club used this site for camping, but after a few years was offered a disused Dutch barn in the grounds for conversion into a hut. Work began in January 1961 to dig out and level the floors, and it was officially opened for use in 1963. Electricity was connected in 1967 and a toilet and shower block added in 1975.

== Achievements ==
On 25 September 2025 at around 8am Nepal time, Wesley Marks successfully reached the summit of Manaslu (8,163m), the 8th highest mountain in the world. Before 2025 none of the 14 8,000-metre peaks had seen an ascent by a WBMC member and the highest points reached were around 22,000 ft (6,706 m) by Dot and John Wagstaff during an unsuccessful attempt on Lenin Peak in 1998 and the summits of Lhakpa Ri 23,100 ft (7,041 m) in Tibet by John Edwards in September 2006 and Baruntse 23,497 ft (7,162 m) in Nepal by Wesley Marks in May 2024. The largest number of club members on a major peak occurred on 16 March 2012 when a party of 25 members completed a winter ascent of Jbel Toubkal (4167m) the highest peak in North Africa.

There have been many other achievements by individuals in the club. For example Mike Nicholls, John Hipwood, John Wagstaff, Nev Tandy, Mike Lay, Paul Cleary, Brian Green, Andy Brown, and Chris Dean have completed all the Munros and John Hipwood and Mike Nicholls, having climbed over 1200 Marilyns, were 24th and 34th in the 'RHB Hall of Fame' in 2010. Members' names are also on completers' lists of lesser hills such as the Nuttalls and County Tops in England and Wales. Members have recorded ascents of many alpine peaks including Mont Blanc, Monte Rosa, the Matterhorn and Grossglockner, and further afield have planted the club flag on the summits of Aconcagua, Aneto, Mount Ararat, Mount Elbrus, Jebel Toubkal, Kilimanjaro, Mera Peak and Mount Fuji while Nigel Kettle & John Edwards have climbed virgin summits in Kyrgyzstan and Antarctica respectively. Ken Priest, Pete Poultney and Graeme Stanford are currently three of the club's leading climbers. Van Greaves has published several books of mountaineering photographs and walking as well as many articles in UK walking magazines and Bob Charteris has created the 100 mile Teme Valley Way walk.

== Challenge walks and races ==
Neville and Anne Tandy organised two major UK challenge walks for over 40 years.

- The 25-mile 'Mid Wales Mountain Marathon' over 7 summits between Dinas Mawddwy and Dolgellau, which was first promoted in 1964, includes over 7000 feet of ascent.
- The 'Reservoir Roundabout', a winter walk of 20 miles in the remote Elenith area around the Claerwen and Elan Valley Reservoirs, was inaugurated in 1967. Neville Tandy (died 2013) was by far the most prolific entrant in the 45 miles Across Wales Walk, with over 30 completions, including the first ever double crossing in 1984.

In the 1970s and 1980s WBMC members regularly participated in the Welsh 1000 m Peaks Race and the Long Mynd Hike. John Wagstaff set a race record of 8 hours 47 minutes for the latter in 1981, which stood until 2002 when the route changed. On 17/18 June 1978 Wagstaff completed a triple crossing of the 14 Welsh 3000s (around 66 miles and 22,800 feet of ascent) in 22 hours 49 minutes, a feat which has so far not been repeated, and he is still the only club member to complete the Bob Graham Round of 42 peaks in the Lake District, a feat he achieved in June 1979 supported by a number of club members. John's wife Dorothy Wagstaff is also famous in her own right as a double World Champion, having won her age class (ladies) at the World Triathlon Championships in London’s Hyde Park in September 2013 after previously winning the title in New Zealand a decade earlier.

== Accidents and awards ==
Every mountaineering club has its share of mishaps as slips and falls can sometimes lead to sprains, broken bones or worse, but WBMC has been fortunate in that it has only had a couple of serious accidents. On 23 July 1972 Len York reached the summit of the Matterhorn for the second time in 12 months but a fall on the descent led to a spinal injury which left him paraplegic. In spite of this York still managed to reach mountain summits and revisited Zermatt most years up to his death. In August 1989 Malcolm Collins fell to his death while climbing solo on Sub Cneifon Arete in the Ogwen Valley when a rock spike gave way. A trophy in his memory is usually awarded at the annual general meeting to a club member in recognition of mountaineering achievement or services to the club. Recipients of the silver rosebowl, which is presented at the AGM the following year, have been 1989 Graham Sockett, 1990 Bob Lister, 1991 Ken Priest, 1992 Geoff Robinson, 1993 Mike Nicholls & John Wagstaff, 1994 Mike Smith, 1995 Peter Woodward, 1996 Iris Cooksey, 1997 Nev Tandy, 1998 Dot & John Wagstaff, 1999 Paul Cleary & Pete Goddard, 2000 John Mitchell, 2001 Hilary Jones, 2002 Nigel Kettle, 2003 Ann Tandy, 2004 John Mitchell, 2005 The "Elbrus Eight" (Andy Brown, John Edwards, Fred Hammonds, Guy Harris, Geoff Hill, Phil Matthews, Oliver Stephenson & Nev Tandy), 2006 John Edwards, 2007 The Hut Trio : Mike Thompson, Bob Duncan & Malcolm Vaughan, 2008 John Eadon, 2009 Bob Duncan, 2010 Not awarded, 2011 Jonathan Howells, 2012 Mel Evans, 2013 Ursula Woodhouse, 2014 Andy Brown & Chris Dean, 2015 Ken Priest, 2016 Tracey Cook & Guy Harris, 2017 Not awarded, 2018 Pete Poultney, 2019 & 2020 Not awarded, 2021 Nigel Tarr, 2022 John Edwards, 2023 Joe Priest, 2024 Wesley Marks & Darren Groutage, 2025 Dan Bow, Claire Hammonds & Geordie Hind.

== See also ==
- Scottish Mountaineering Club
- Alpine Club
- Climbers' Club
- Hill lists in the British Isles
- Mountains and hills of Scotland
