= Hieracium snowdoniense =

Scientific classification
- Kingdom: Plantae
- Clade: Tracheophytes
- Clade: Angiosperms
- Clade: Eudicots
- Clade: Asterids
- Order: Asterales
- Family: Asteraceae
- Genus: Hieracium
- Species: H. snowdoniense

Binomial name
- Hieracium snowdoniense P.D.Sell & C.West

Species of flowering plant

Hieracium snowdoniense, the Snowdonia hawkweed, is a species of flowering plant within the family Asteraceae. The species is endemic to Snowdonia, North Wales.

It was believed to have become extinct in the early 1950s as a result of overgrazing sheep on the habitat. In 2002, three plants of the species were re-discovered on steep slopes in the Cwm Idwal National Nature Reserve above Bethesda. In 2021 it appeared that the population had doubled to six plants, but they were in an extremely inaccessible place, making it impossible to confirm that all six were in fact Hieracium snowdoniense.

In order to conserve the population, conservationists have removed sheep from the area. Seeds of the species were also collected, and captive specimens are being cultivated at the National Botanic Garden of Wales.

== Description ==
Hieracium snowdoniense is a perennial species, which possesses a rosette of leaves at the base of the plant. Leaves are lanceolate to ovate, toothed weakly and narrow at the base. Both sides of the leaf possess hairs. Stems of the plant reach up to 40 cm and host flowers. Peduncles are varied in length and support golden-yellow inflorescences.
