= Afon Ogwen =

River in north-west Wales

Coordinates: 53°14′N 4°05′W

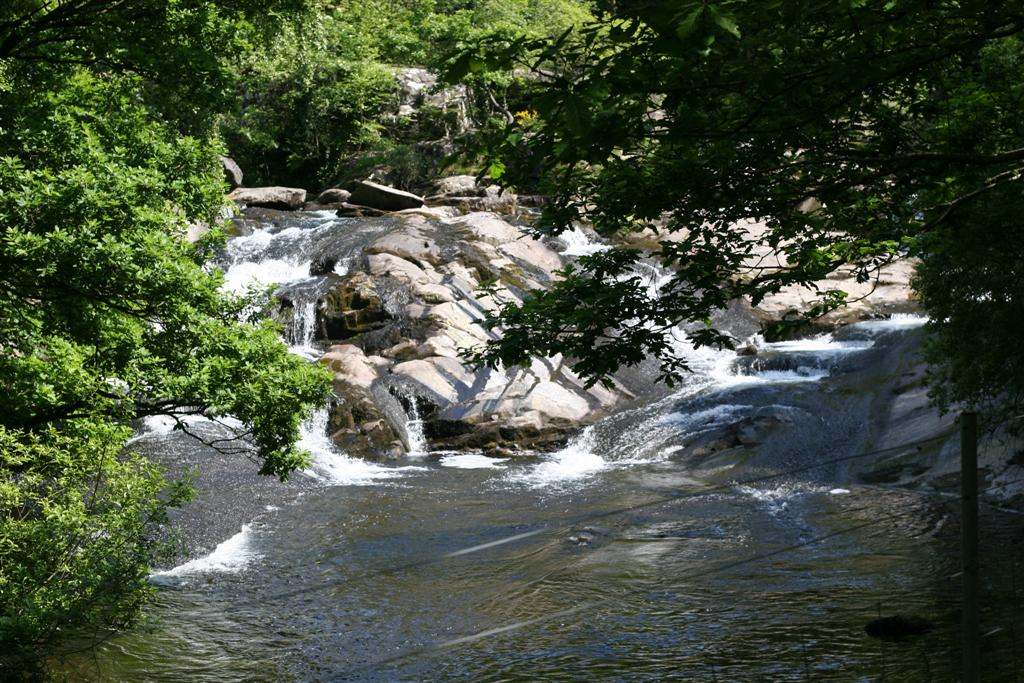
- The Afon Ogwen above Bethesda

Location
- Country: Wales

Physical characteristics
- Source: Llyn Ogwen, Gwynedd
- Mouth: Menai Strait
  - location: Near Penrhyn Castle, Gwynedd

Afon Ogwen (Welsh for 'River Ogwen'; Welsh: [ˈɔɡʊɛn]) is a river in north-west Wales draining from some of the greatest peaks in Snowdonia before discharging to the sea on the eastern side of Bangor, Gwynedd.

== Etymology ==
Although the spoken form in the local North Wales dialect is Ogwan (with an A), and it has also recently been shown that Ogwan is an original form of the name; the form Ogwen is believed to have been mistakenly adopted as a kind of back-formation, because many words ending in -en become -an in the north Wales dialect.

The name of the river is recorded as Oguanw (with the U doing duty for modern F) in a poem in the Hendregadredd Manuscript. The name is probably a compound word: og + Banw (after language mutation, turns into 'Fanw') 'piglet' = ogfanw. The precise meaning of og is less clear, but it may either be cognate with the Irish Tír na n-Óg (land of youth) or else derive from the Proto-Indo-European *oku ("soon, fast").

== Sources ==
The main source of the Ogwen is in Llyn Ogwen, which is situated alongside the A5 road as it starts to descend through Snowdonia. However, the true source of the river lies in the three streams draining into Llyn Ogwen. These are Nant Gwern y Gof, Afon Denau, and Afon Lloer which itself has its source in the upland lake, Ffynnon Lloer.

== Waterfalls ==
The Ogwen emerging at the western end of Llyn Ogwen immediately descends cataracts and waterfalls, known as Ogwen Falls in English and Rhaeadr Ogwen in Welsh, before continuing in a north-north-westerly direction down the glaciated Nant Ffrancon valley.

== Re-Engineered ==
In the 1950s and 1960s, the stretch of river through Nant Ffrancon was re-engineered to try to help drain the adjoining farmland. However, the beneficial effects were not significant and the ecological damage was great. In the 1990s, the Environment Agency, working with partners including the Countryside Council for Wales and farming groups, re-engineered the river to recreate pools and riffles with the intention of allowing the river to re-gain its original form and diversity of wildlife.

As the river continues northwards, it passes close to the great waste tips of slate produced by the Penrhyn slate quarry. A dam was built in the Afon Ogwen at Ogwen Bank, in the early 20th century, to raise the level of the river in order to provide water for the use of the nearby Penrhyn Quarry and then past a caravan site, Ogwen Bank, where the remains of a long abandoned watermill and mill pond still exist. Passing Braichmelyn village on its eastern bank, it is joined by the substantial tributary, the Afon Caseg, which drains a large area of the Carneddau mountains. The course turns slightly more westwards as the river passes through Bethesda and becomes progressively more wooded and more deeply cut providing some white water conditions enjoyed by canoeists.

The widening river is then followed by an abandoned railway line (now the Lon Las Ogwen cycle path) through a woodland valley crossing under the main north Wales coast line and the A55 before discharging to the Menai Strait at Aberogwen, near Bangor.

== Tributaries ==
Right

- Afon Bodesi
- Afon Lloer
- Afon Denau
- Afon Caseg
  - Afon Llafar
- Afon Ffrydlas
- Afon Llan (Llanllechid)

Left

- Nant (neu Afon) Gwern y Gof
- Nant Bochlwyd
- Nant Cywion
- Nant Bual
- Nant Berfedd
