= Llyn Idwal =

Lake in Conwy County Borough, Wales

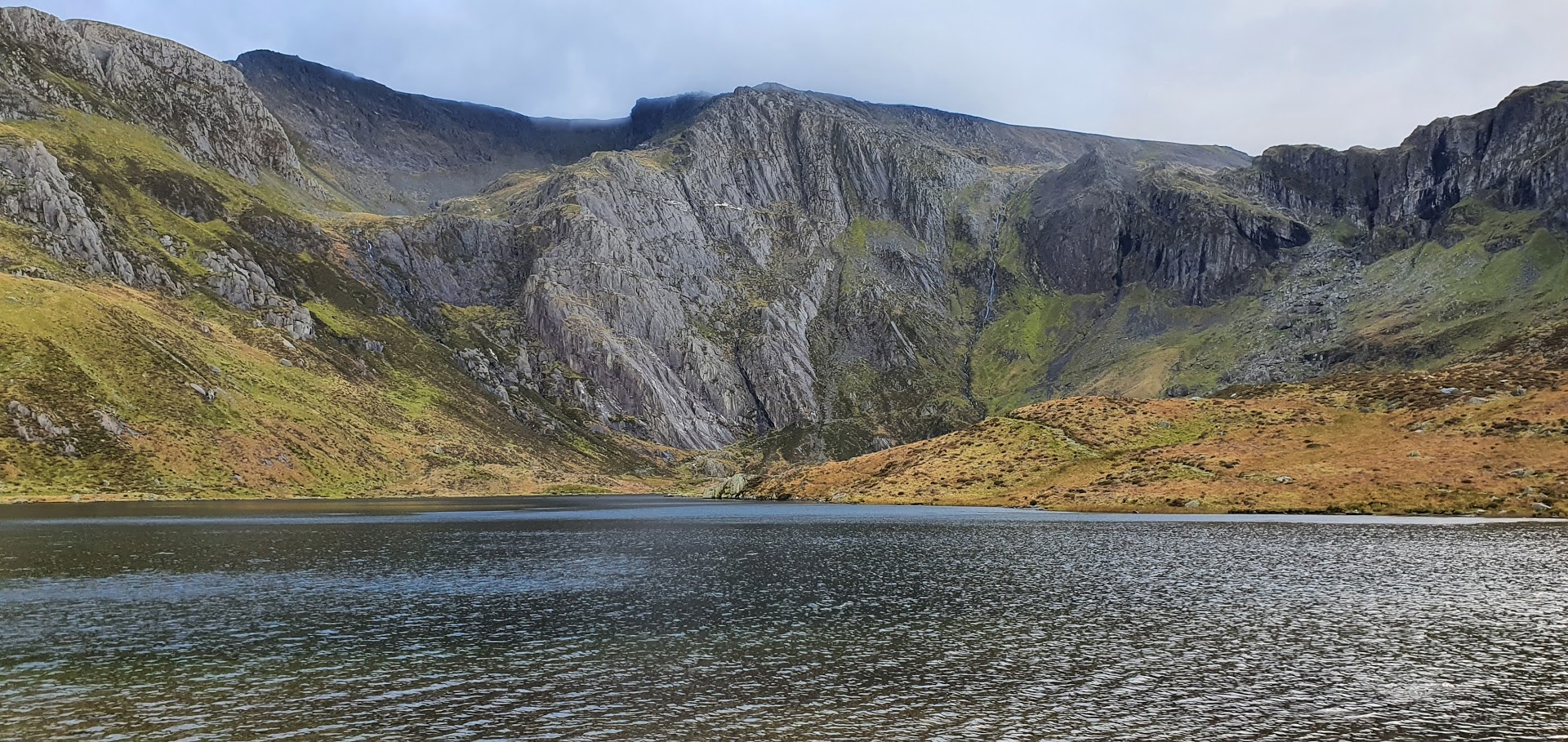

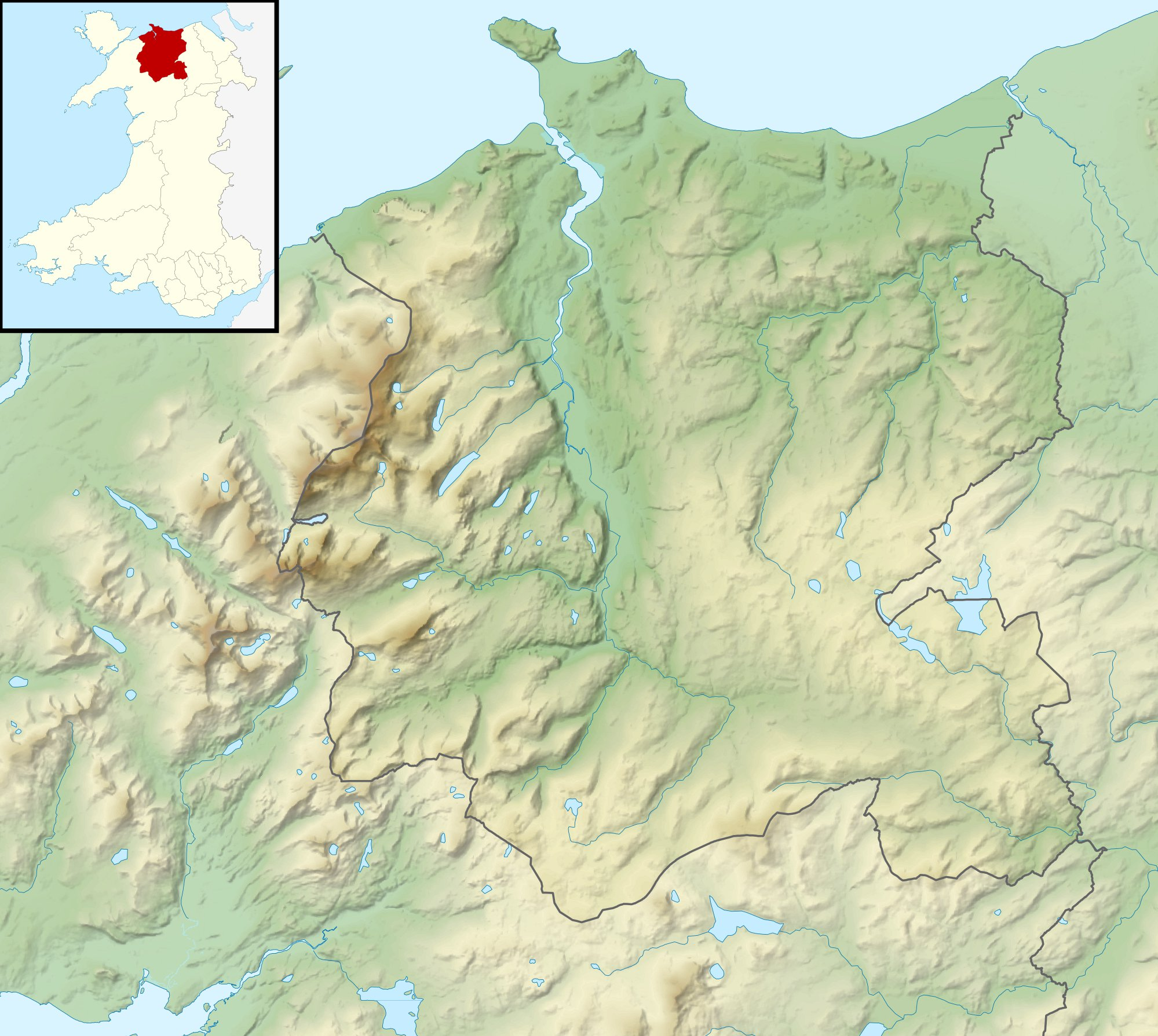
- Location within Conwy
- Location: Snowdonia, Wales
- Coordinates: 53°6′57″N 4°1′32″W
- Lake type: natural
- Basin countries: United Kingdom
- Max. length: 2,115 feet (645 m)
- Max. width: 885 feet (270 m)
- Surface area: 28 acres (11 ha)
- Surface elevation: 373 m (1,224 ft)
- Islands: numerous islets

Ramsar Wetland
- Designated: 7 November 1991
- Reference no.: 534

Llyn Idwal is a small lake (approximately 800 m by 300 m, or 28 acres) that lies within Cwm Idwal in the Glyderau mountains of Snowdonia.

It is named after Prince Idwal Foel, a grandson of Rhodri Mawr, one of the ancient Kings of Wales. Legend states that the king's unfortunate offspring was murdered by being drowned in the lake. In fact Idwal Foel died in battle against the Saxons in 942 and an alternate version claims that he was cremated beside the lake, as was the burial custom for Celtic nobility.

A number of small streams flow into Llyn Idwal from around Cwm Idwal. One small river flows out and joins the Afon Ogwen river at Pont Pen-y-Benglog near Ogwen Cottage, immediately above the Rhaeadr Ogwen waterfall. It is considered relatively oligotrophic.

== Paths ==
The lake is easily accessible on foot via a 900-metre long stone-paved path from Ogwen Cottage on the main A5 road. Another path encircles the lake. Two paths lead from opposite sides of the lake to the top of the ridge close to the Twll Du (Devil's Kitchen), but these paths become rather steep in places. They lead to Glyder Fach and Glyder Fawr.

There is a small pebble beach at the northwest edge of Llyn Idwal which is occasionally used by visitors for recreation. Swimming is not allowed in Llyn Idwal, as it is a protected environment, and home to several protected species.

The lake lies wholly within Gwynedd County, although the eastern edge forms the boundary between the counties of Gwynedd and Conwy.

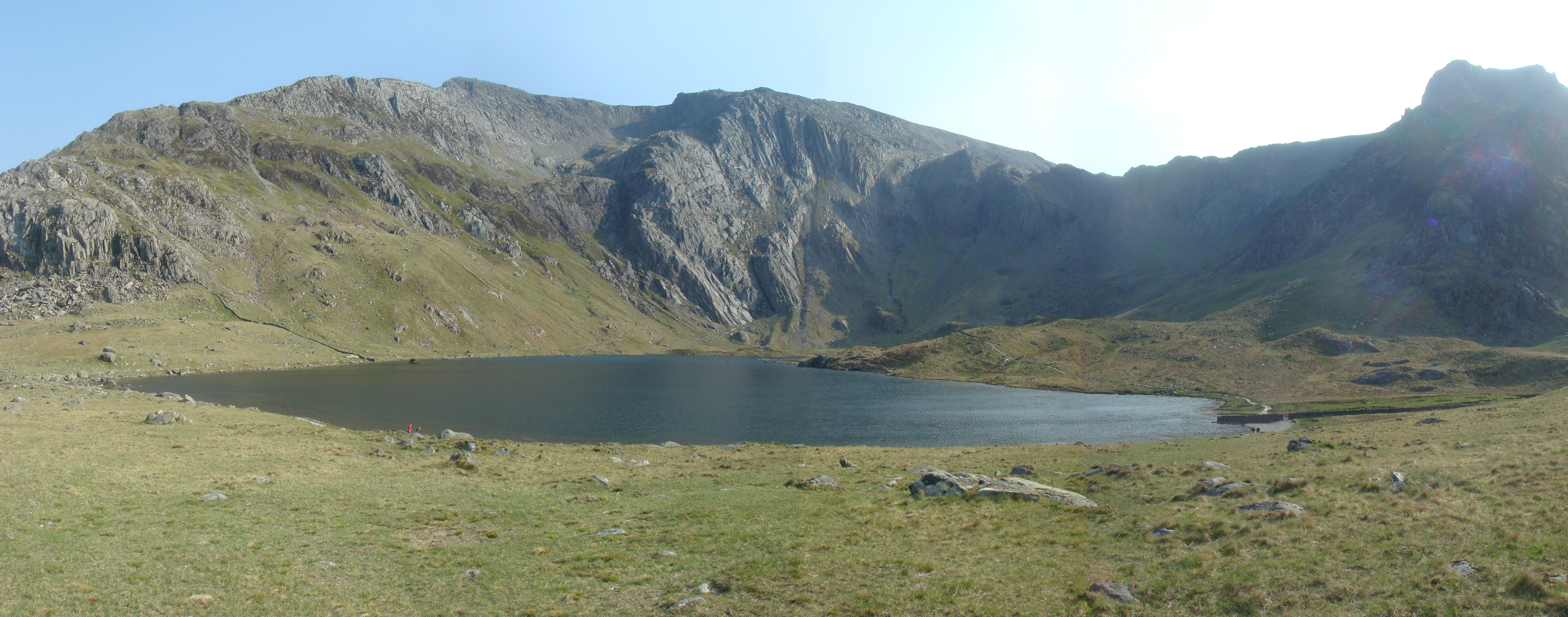
Llyn Idwal, summer 2007

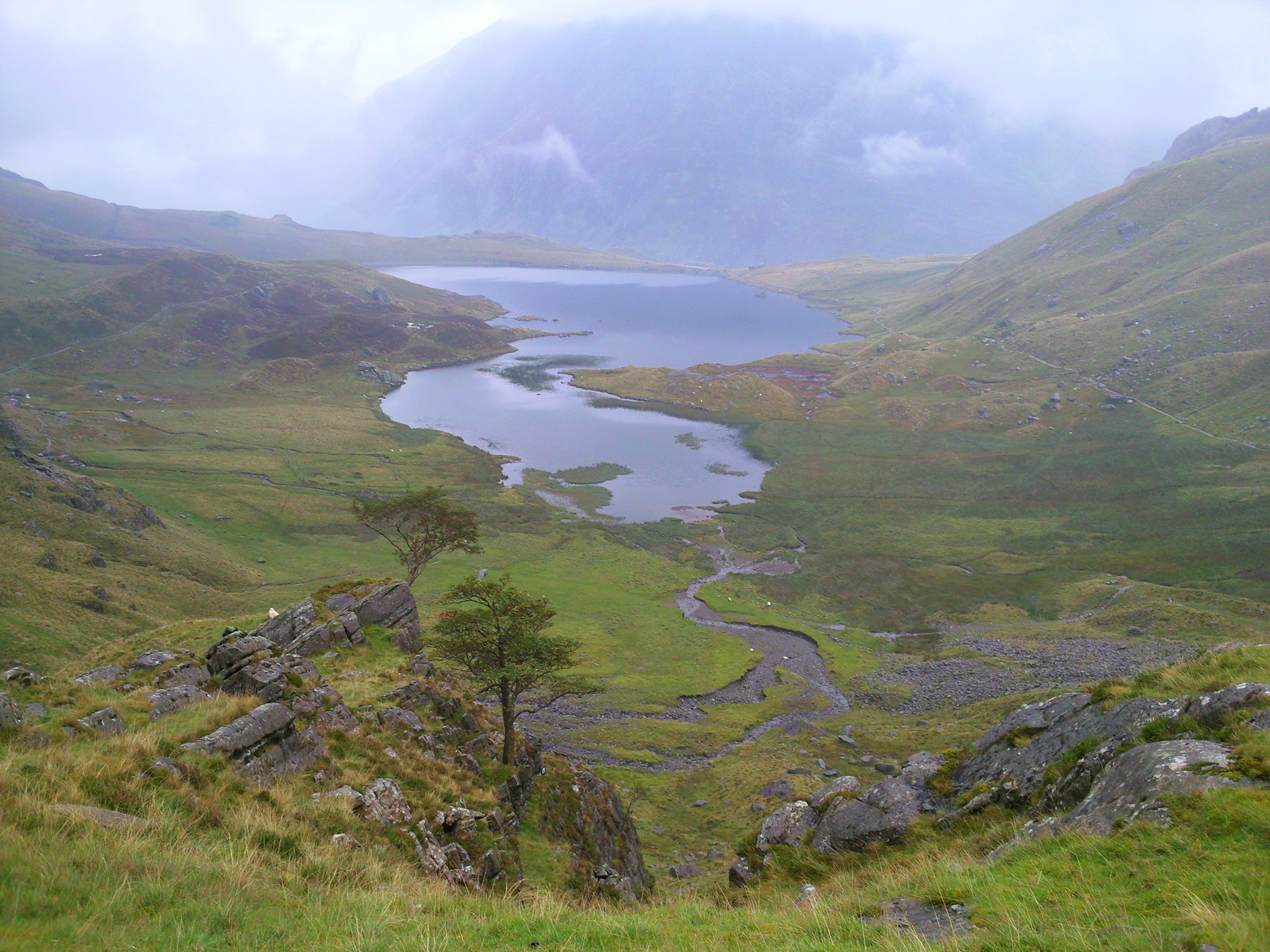
Llyn Idwal surrounded in mist, summer 2008
