= Plas Gwynant =

Coordinates: 53.0344°N 4.0438°W

Plas Gwynant is an educational resort in Snowdonia, Wales. This country estate also includes a woodland and riverside walks, as well as a parkland and 19-century garden set. It was built and developed by Daniel Vawdry in 1803. Today, the resort is owned by Sandwell Metropolitan Borough Council, and most primary schools in Sandwell visit it on a yearly basis. West Bromwich Mountaineering Club renovated a disused barn in the grounds and have used it as their climbing hut since the early 1960s. The gardens and parkland are listed at Grade II on the Cadw/ICOMOS Register of Parks and Gardens of Special Historic Interest in Wales.

Plas Gwynant also became the home of historian James Anthony Froude, who arrived there with his wife in 1850. An account cited that notable figures such as Max Muller, Matthew Arnold, Arthur Clough, and Richard Powles spend their time with him there during spring and summer.
