= Llyn Bochlwyd =

Lake in Snowdonia, Wales

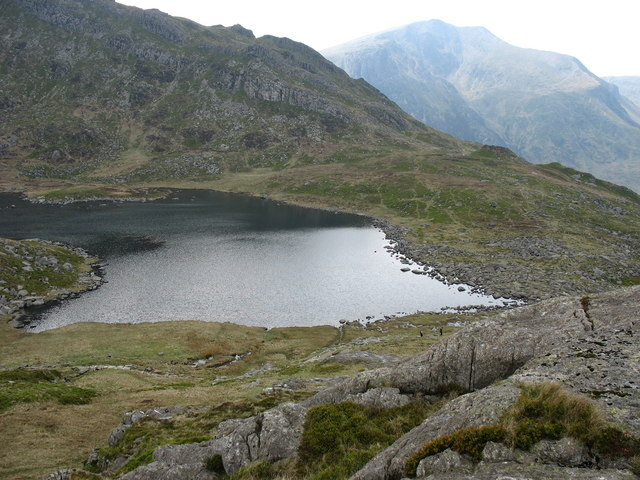
- The outflow of Llyn Bochlwyd

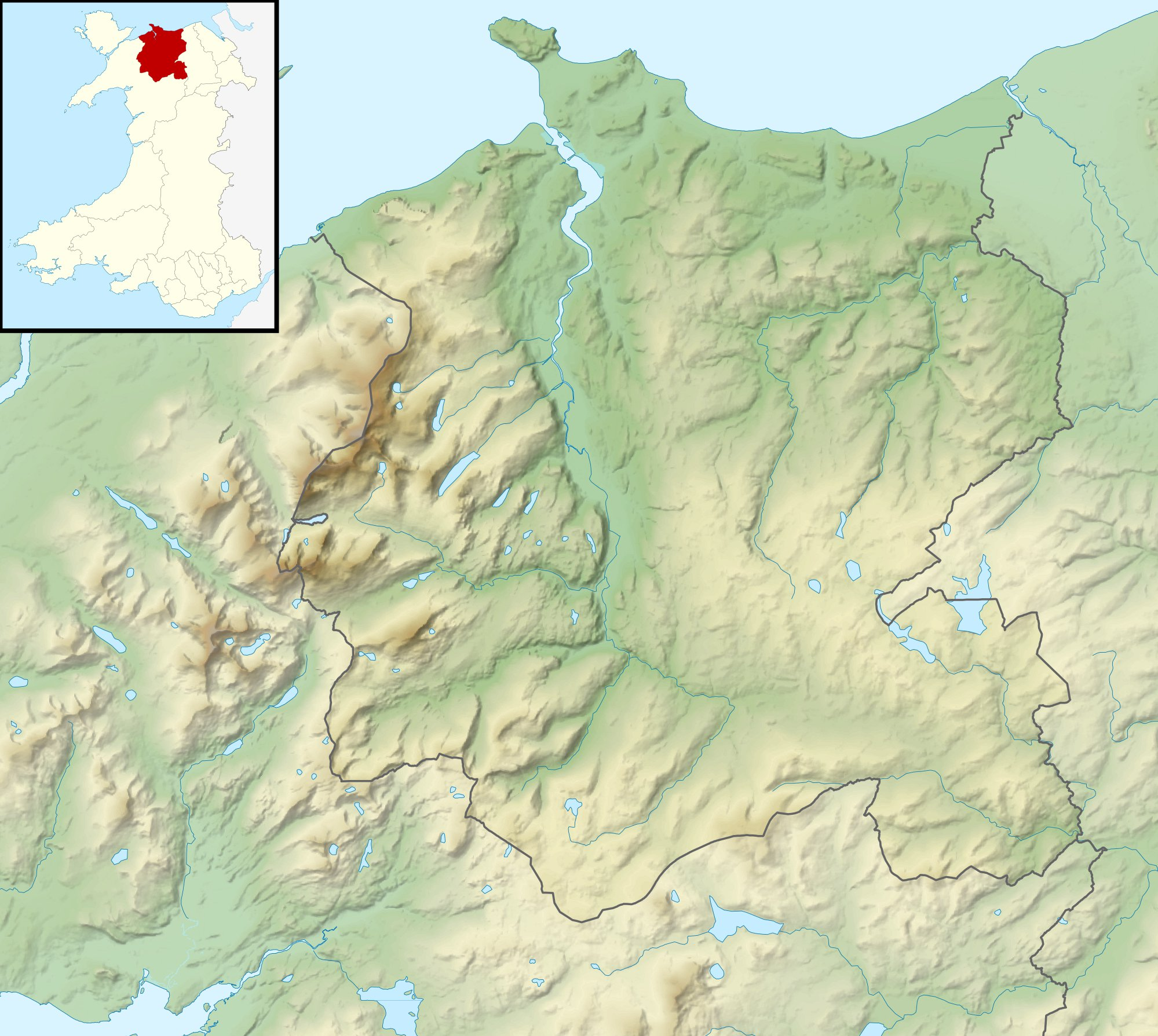
- Location within Conwy
- Location: Snowdonia, Wales
- Coordinates: 53°06′N 4°0′W
- Type: natural
- Primary outflows: Nant Bochlwyd
- Basin countries: United Kingdom
- Surface area: 4.208 ha (10.40 acres)
- Surface elevation: 555 m (1,821 ft)

Llyn Bochlwyd (Welsh pronunciation: [ɬɨ̞n bɔχluːɨ̯d, ɬɪn bɔχlʊi̯d]) is a lake in Snowdonia, Wales, in Conwy County Borough. It lies in Cwm Bochlwyd, near Llyn Ogwen in the Glyderau mountain range.

== Name and controversy ==
The name translates as "Lake of the Greycheek". According to a local legend, this is where an old grey stag, fleeing a hunter, miraculously escaped by leaping from a great height into the lake and swimming to safety while holding its grey cheeks above the surface, in order to breathe.

In some English-language guidebooks and websites, the lake is referred to as "Lake Australia", as the shape of the lake when viewed from above is said to resemble the map of Australia. The adoption of a new English name in favour of the traditional Welsh name has been criticised as linguistic discrimination. In 2018 the broadcaster Tudur Owen cited the name change as an example of "erasing history". The name change has also been referenced in the debate around preserving historic place-names in law. In 2020, the Plaid Cymru Shadow Minister for Culture and the Welsh Language, Siân Gwenllian, mentioned the lake when raising the possibility of a new bill to preserve Welsh place-names. In 2023 the Eryri National Park Authority voted to use a standardised list of names for its lakes, all of which are in Welsh only.
