= Afon Lloer =

Small river in Snowdonia, Wales

Coordinates: 53.12746°N 3.99559°W

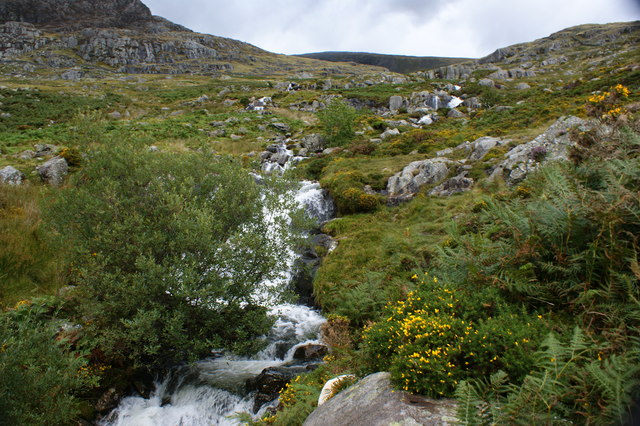
A waterfall on Afon Lloer

Afon Lloer is a small river in Snowdonia in north-west Wales. It is the outflow from Ffynnon Lloer, a lake in the Carneddau mountains, and it flows into Llyn Ogwen.
