= Ogwen Cottage =

Mountaineering centre in Wales

Coordinates: 53.1232°N 4.0187°W

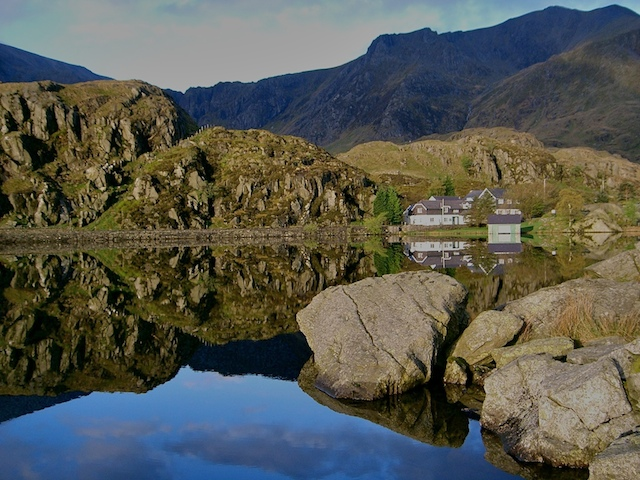
Ogwen Cottage from across Llyn Ogwen

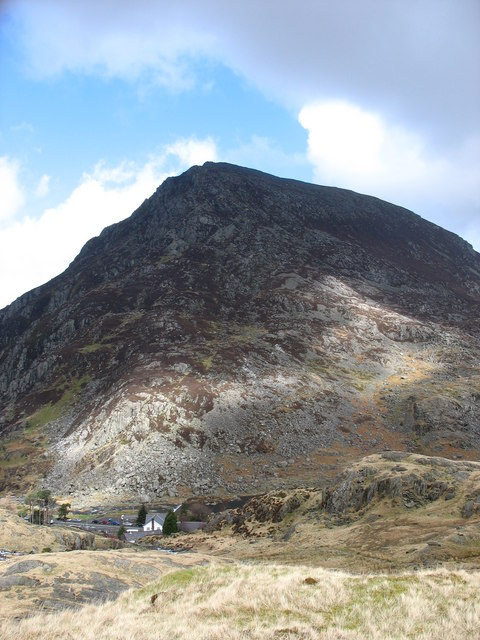
Pen yr Ole Wen with Ogwen Cottage at the bottom, seen on the descent from Cmw Idwal

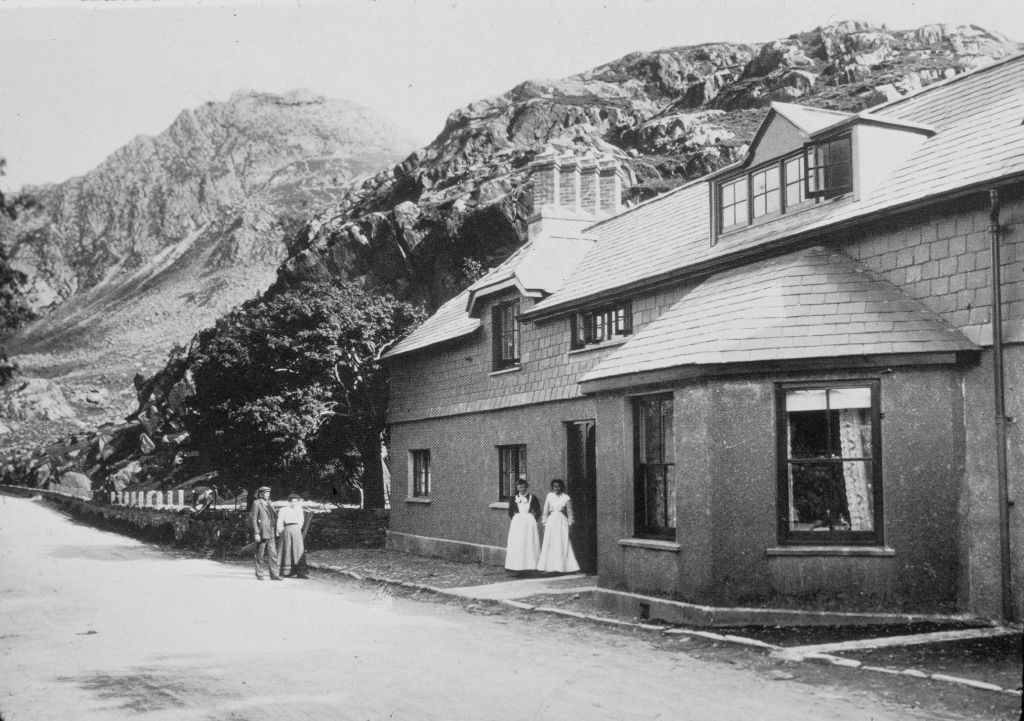
Ogwen Cottage from the NW, with Tryfan in the background c1920

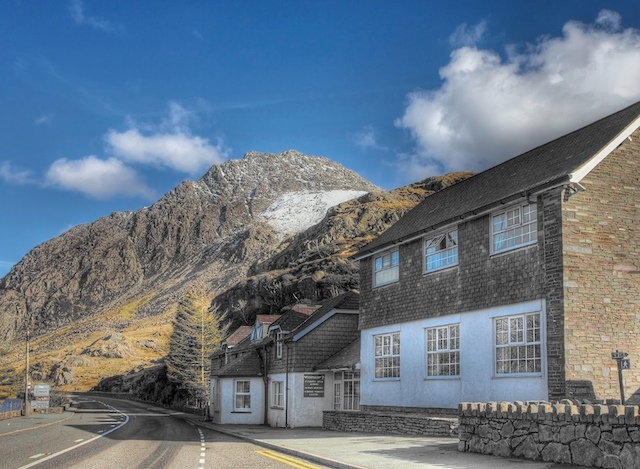
Ogwen Cottage from the NW, with Tryfan in the background c2005

Ogwen Cottage Outdoor Pursuits Centre is situated beside Llyn Ogwen, in Gwynedd, Wales. It is owned by the National Trust, who bought the property at auction in October 2014 for £450,000. It was formerly for many years part of Birmingham City Council's Outdoor Learning Service, providing outdoor education, and with links to the climbing community.

== Thomas Telford ==
Located on the London to Holyhead A5 road (Great Britain), Ogwen developed as a stage coach inn and the present stores building was once stabling for horses. The nearby Tin Can Alley was a source of honing stones used to sharpen tools during the construction of the A5 by Thomas Telford. This mammoth project started in 1815 and it was 1836 by the time the first mail coach crossed the Menai Straits via Telford's bridge. Telford designed the milestones and the hexagonal toll houses every five miles. Toll houses survive in Capel Curig and Bethesda, Wales whilst in the middle stands Ogwen.

== Climbers ==
The centre is informally referred to as "The Cott" and has been used as a base for climbers since the nineteenth century. During the 1890s climbers stayed at Ogwen or the Pen-y-Gwryd and early accounts make mention of Mrs Jones of Ogwen Cottage; " Mrs Jones at Ogwen Cottage always most good naturedly received and fed us if we turned up, no matter at what hour.”

In 1895 Archer Thompson ascended Twll Du, climbing the ice with an unusual tool; "According to tradition Thor was armed with a hammer for his battle with the Frost Giants, and with such a weapon, we too, were luckily provided in the form of a hatchet, surreptitiously removed from Mrs Jones' coal cellar at Ogwen.”

The 1894 Climbers' Club Journal contained an advert for The Cott citing it as "the chief centre for climbers visiting Snowdonia….the cottage is on the high road and conveyances meet visitors at Bethesda Station if so desired.”

Geoffrey Winthrop Young, a noted alpinist with many first ascents to his credit, stayed at Ogwen between visits to the Alps in the early 1900s.

== Mountaineering School ==
1959 saw Ron James, Trevor Jones and Tony Mason-Hornby purchasing The Cott from Mrs Williams and opening it as a mountaineering school. Ogwen became a climbing base and Mrs Williams gave the new owners advice on mounting rescues; "Fire a red flare in the car park – get the climbers together and put the one with the cleanest boots in charge.”

With increasing leisure time and improved transport links, Ogwen grew as a climbing mecca and The Cott's instructors regularly became involved in rescuing climbers in trouble and gradually a specialist mountain rescue team evolved into what is now the Ogwen Valley Mountain Rescue Organisation.

== Birmingham City Council ==
Ron James remained chief instructor for another five years after Birmingham City Council purchased The Cott in 1964.

Over the next 45 years thousands of Birmingham people attended courses at Ogwen. Until the 1980s courses were for a fortnight but economic considerations and the need to take more students meant a reduction to six days.

The Adventurous Activities Licensing Service (AALLS) pays regular visits and while the activities may not be as extreme as they once were, Ogwen is probably the only centre in the UK to programme multi-pitch climbing for secondary school students.

== Activities ==
The traditional core of mountaineering activities remains with an emphasis on mountain walking and climbing but the programme has expanded to include kayaking, gorge walking, canoeing, ski trips, orienteering, expeditions. A student might ascend Hope on the Idwal Slabs as their first ever climb, before descending Suicide Wall by abseil. An evening of orienteering and then the next day might see a kayak descent of the Afon Llugwy or a walk up Tryfan.

== Residential experience ==
The National Trust for Wales purchased Ogwen Cottage in 2014 and since 2015 works in partnership with The Outward Bound Trust to offer young people from all over the country a memorable outdoor experience.

== Sale in 2014 ==
In October 2014 it was sold off by Birmingham City Council, which had to close its outdoor education service due to funding cuts and an increasing number of schools switching to different venues for educational trips. The National Trust purchased it at auction for £450,000.

== See also ==
- Llyn Idwal
- Cwm Idwal
- Glyderau
- Carneddau
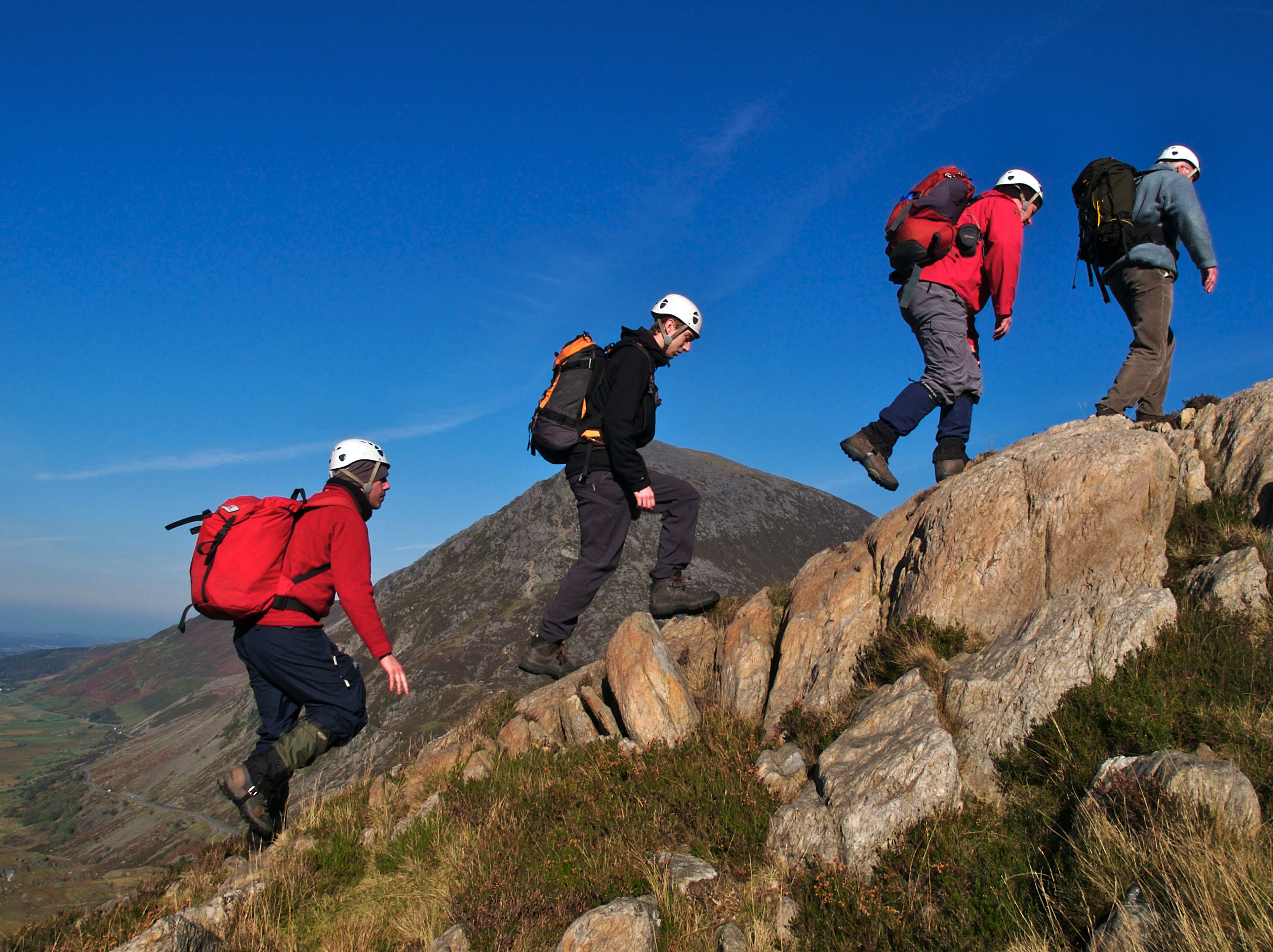
Mountain Leader Trainees from Ogwen Cottage

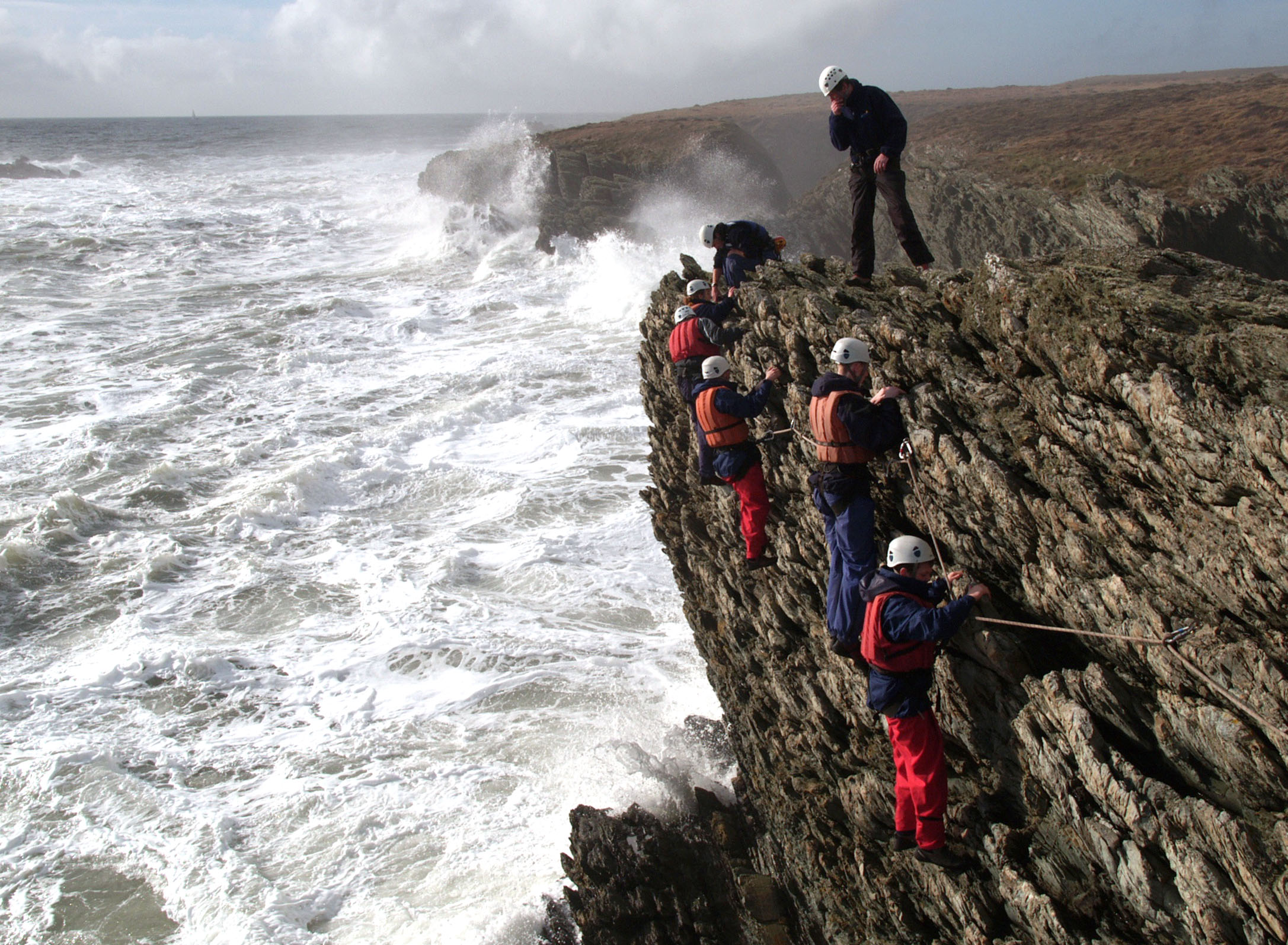
A Birmingham School group on a sea level traverse on Anglesey

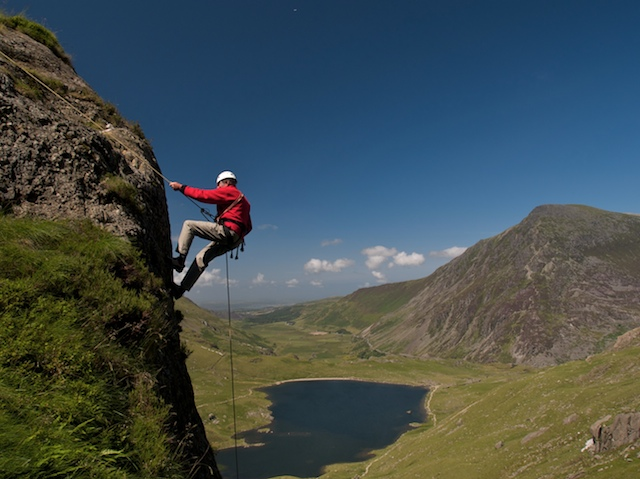
Former Principal (2010) Stan Lowe above Ogwen

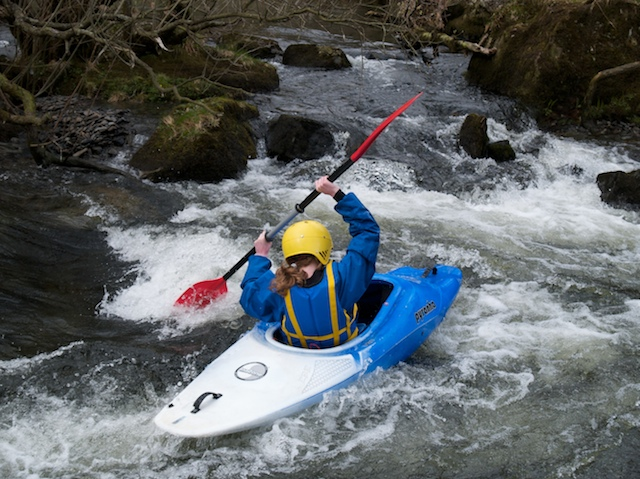
A student from Ogwen Cottage on kayaking activity day
