= Ffynnon Lloer =

Lake in Conwy County Borough, Wales

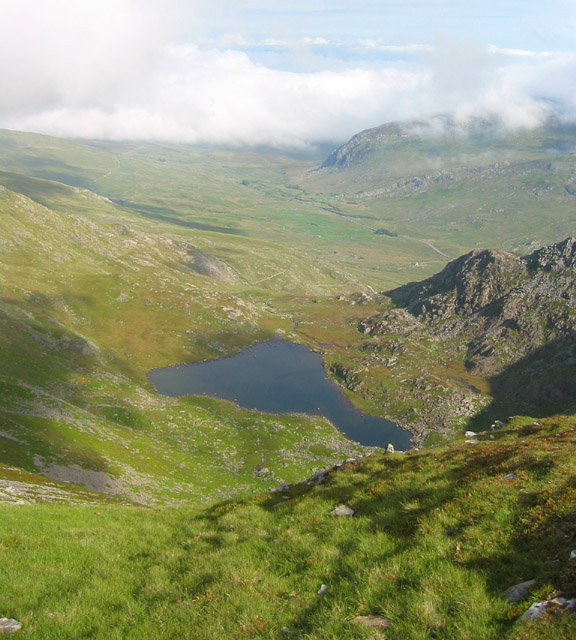

- Location within Wales
- Location: Snowdonia, North Wales
- Coordinates: 53°8′21″N 4°0′4″W
- Type: natural
- Primary outflows: Afon Lloer
- Basin countries: United Kingdom
- Surface area: 6 acres (2.43 ha)

Ffynnon Lloer (Welsh for 'source of [the] Moon') is a lake in the Carneddau range of mountains in Snowdonia, North Wales. It lies below the peaks of Pen yr Ole Wen and Carnedd Dafydd at a height of 2,225 feet (678 m) and covers an area of some 6 acres (2.43 ha).

The remains of two wartime aircraft, which crashed in 1942 and 1943, lie on the slopes round the lake.

Afon Lloer, its outflow, flows into Llyn Ogwen.
