= Ogwen Valley =

Valley in northwest Wales

Coordinates: 53.1250°N 4.0000°W

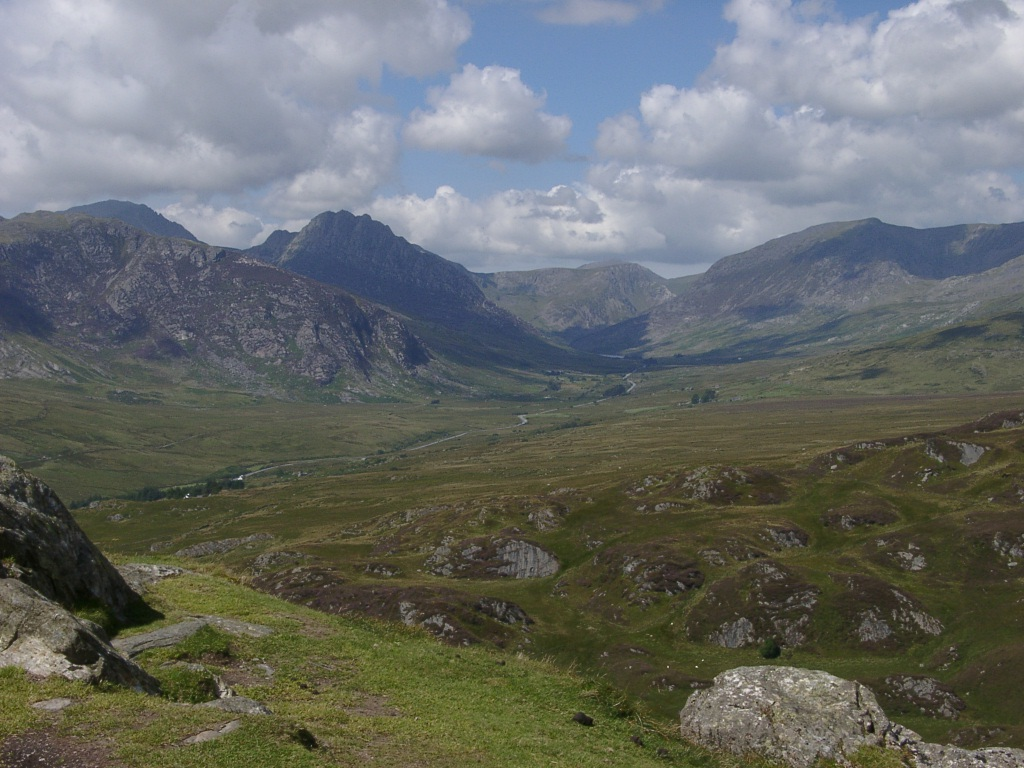
View west down the Ogwen Valley from the Crimpiau. Tryfan and the Glyderau to the left, the Carneddau to the right.

The Ogwen Valley, or Dyffryn Ogwen in Welsh, is a valley mostly located in the Welsh county of Gwynedd. The upper section of the valley, east of Llyn Ogwen, lies in the county borough of Conwy.

== Geography ==
The valley lies to the south of Bangor. It is bordered one side by the Glyderau mountain range and on the other by the Carneddau. The River Ogwen (Afon Ogwen in Welsh) flows through it, separating the two mountain ranges. The valley is a part of Snowdonia National Park.

The valley was historically dependent on the roofing slate industry and suffered from its decline from the 1960s onward. The only other significant source of employment was and still is mountain sheep farming. Unemployment is currently around 20%.

The area of the valley spanning from Bethesda to Port Penrhyn was included in the Slate Landscape of Northwest Wales UNESCO World Heritage Site in 2021.

== Recreation ==
The Ogwen Valley, as a result of being bordered on all sides by mountainous regions, is home to many hill walkers, climbers, and campers. This level of recreational activity can at times result in people getting into trouble on the hills, and to address this problem the Ogwen Valley Mountain Rescue Organisation was set up. The work was initially started by Ron James at Ogwen Cottage outdoor pursuits centre; however, the need became great enough that mountain rescue in the area needed a full-time body to be initiated.

Clwb Rygbi Bethesda (Bethesda Rugby Club) is one of the centres of social life in the valley and many boys and girls play rugby from a young age. There is also a successful Football Club and Cricket Club along with a Bowling Green in the valley, and a council-run Leisure Centre. Combine they cater for all sports, ages and abilities imaginable.

The longest zip wire (Zip World) in Europe has been extremely successful since it opened in the valley and attracts adventurers from all over the world.

== People ==
The northern parts of the valley include the small town of Bethesda, notable for the slate quarry, which was previously owned by Lord Douglas Penrhyn and gave Penrhyn quarry its name. It also includes smaller villages such as Tregarth, Mynydd Llandygai Rachub, Sling, Caerneddi, Braichmelyn, Gerlan, Henbarc and Llanllechid. At its peak in the early 20th century, over 20,000 people lived in the valley, but this has now declined to around 6500. Three-quarters of inhabitants are able to speak Welsh. According to the Welsh Index of Multiple Deprivation, all wards in the valley are amongst the poorest 10% in Wales, with one ward among the poorest 3%.

Ysgol Dyffryn Ogwen is the secondary school for the entire valley, with pupil streams coming mainly for Ysgol Llanllechid, Ysgol Tregarth, Ysgol Mynydd Llandegai and Ysgol Pen y Bryn.

== Popular culture ==
The valley was used extensively as a location for the ITV show “Mr Bates vs The Post Office”, primarily using a house on the south west slope as the home for Mr Bates.

“House of the Dragon” also had scenes shot here from the head of the valley near Llyn Idwal and Nant Ffrancon.
