= Cwm Idwal =

Glacial valley in Snowdonia, Wales

Coordinates: 53.113712°N 4.029927°W

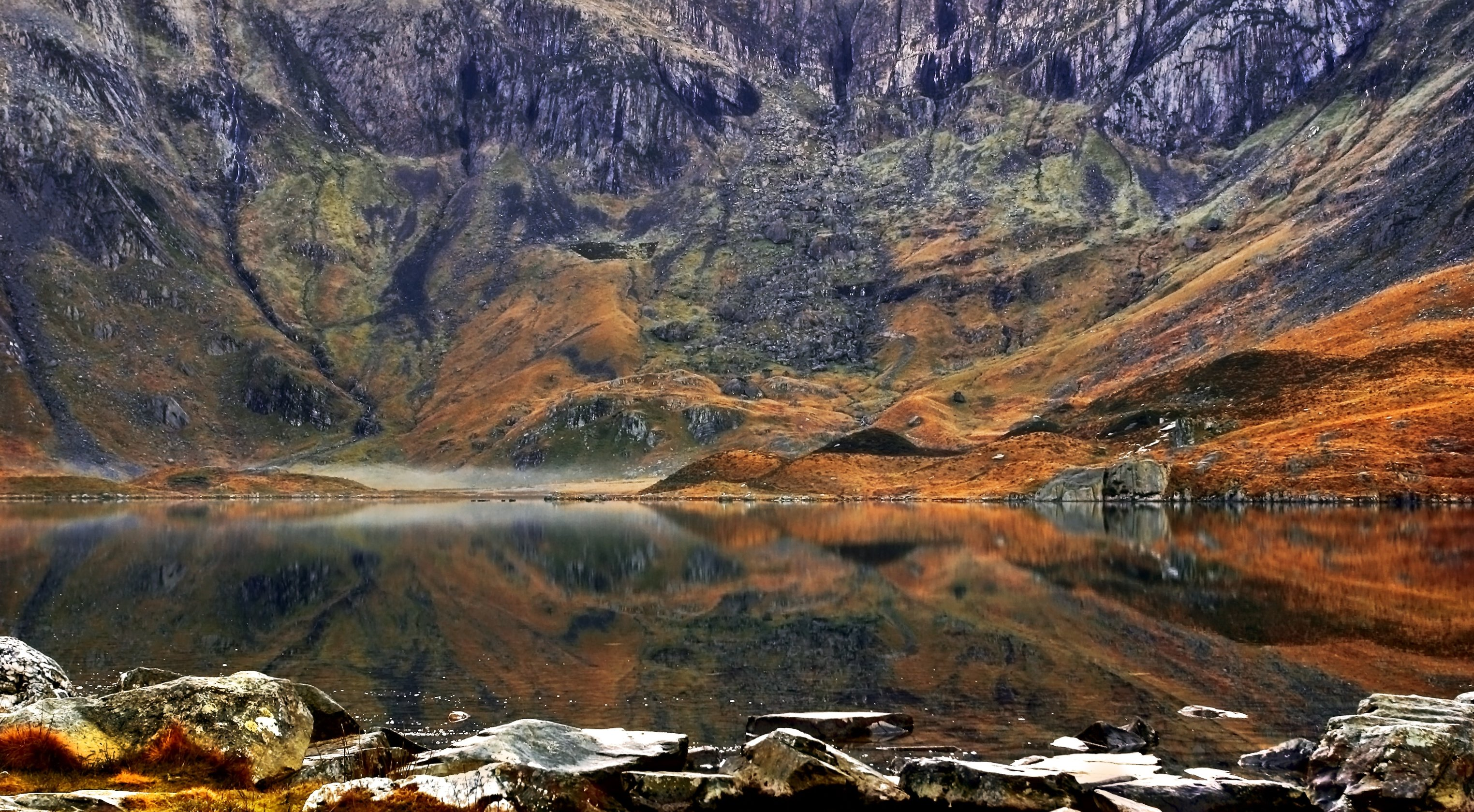
Cwm Idwal and Llyn Idwal

Cwm Idwal is a cirque (or corrie) in the Glyderau range of mountains in northern Snowdonia, the national park in the mountainous region of North Wales. Its main interest is to hill walkers and rock climbers, but it is also of interest to geologists and naturalists, given its combination of altitude (relatively high in UK terms), aspect (north-facing) and terrain (mountainous and rocky). In a 2005 poll conducted by Radio Times, Cwm Idwal was ranked the 7th greatest natural wonder in Britain.

== Geology ==
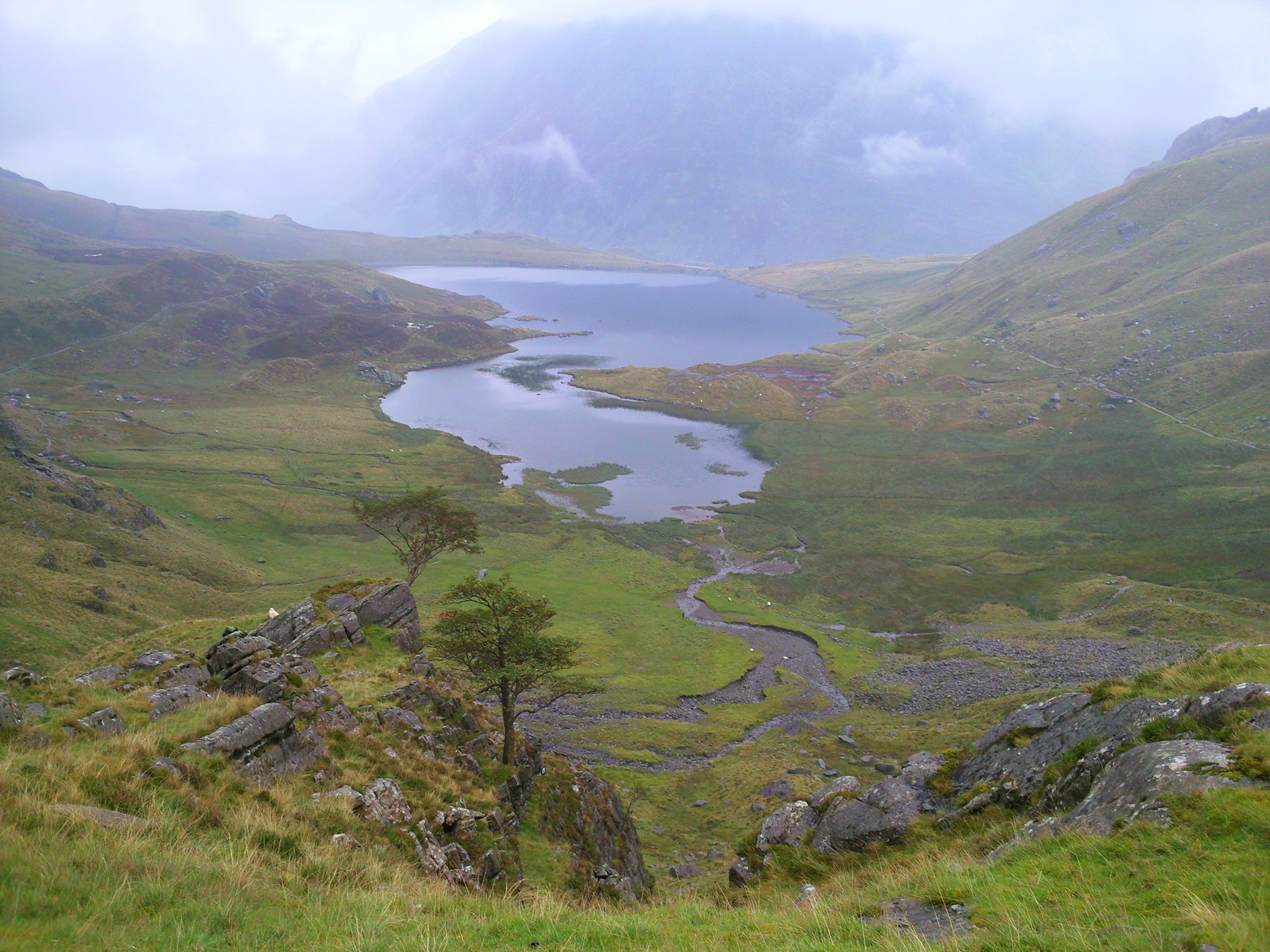
Llyn Idwal, Summer 2008

Cwm Idwal is a spectacular product of glaciation, surrounded by high crags, screes, moraines and rounded rocks, with a lake on its floor (Llyn Idwal). Cwm Idwal comprises volcanic and sedimentary rock which was laid down in a shallow Ordovician sea, and later folded to give rise to the distinctive trough-shaped arrangement of strata known today as the Idwal Syncline. This fold in the rock is visible today, thanks to the layering of the sedimentary rocks. The area was then eroded by glacial action to form the classic semicircular valley.

== Botany ==
Given its elevation and north-facing aspect, Cwm Idwal is the most southerly place in Britain where Arctic plants such as moss campion and some alpine saxifrages, such as tufted saxifrage (Saxifraga cespitosa) and Micranthes nivalis, can be found. It is also a home of the Snowdon lily, a plant which can only be found in the UK on Snowdon and its surroundings. Evan Roberts, the renowned botanist and explorer from Capel Curig, did probably as much as any other (self-taught) botanist to document the area. The Snowdonia hawkweed, Hieracium snowdoniense is only known to occur in Cwm Idwal.

== Rock climbing ==
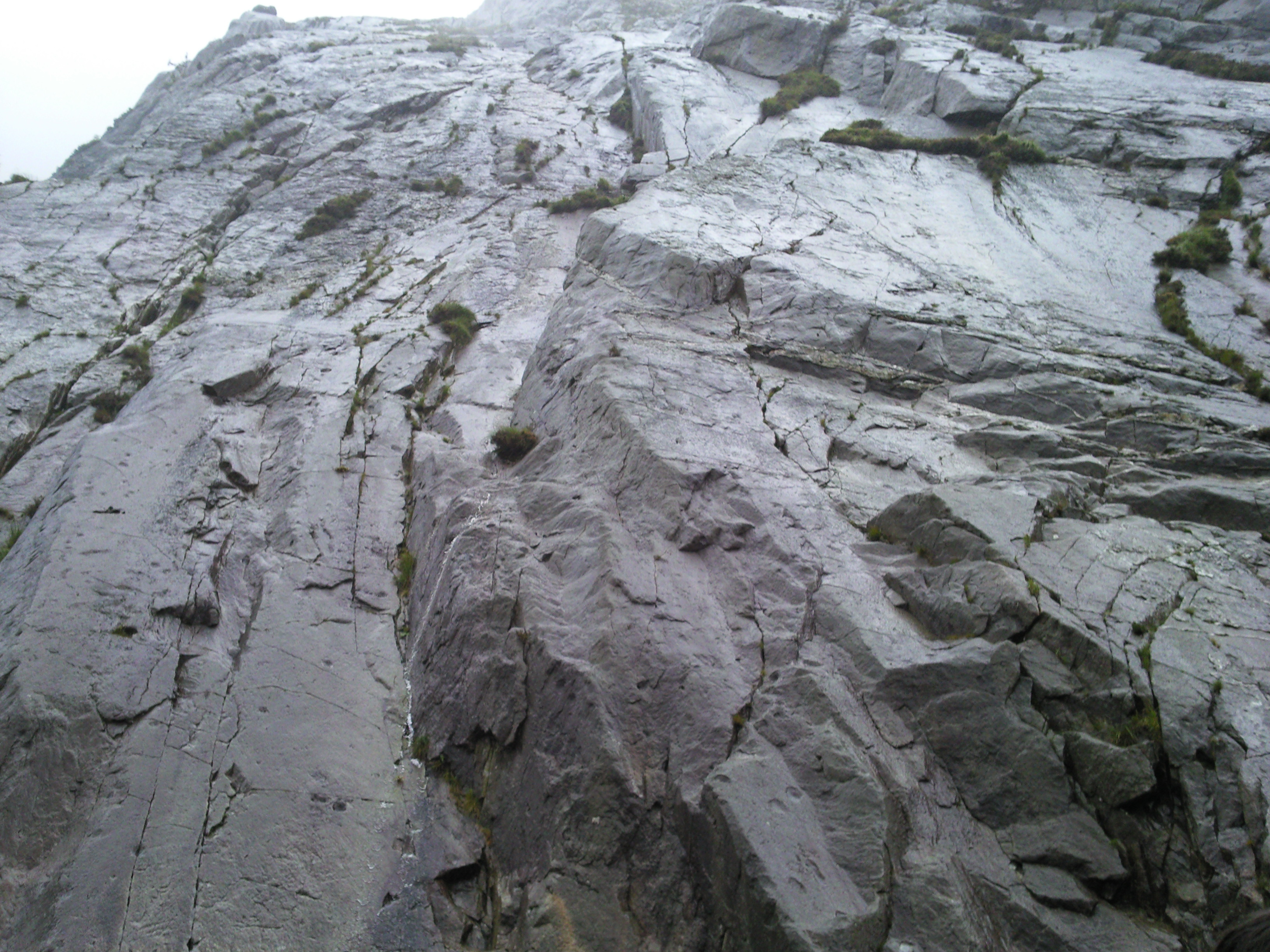
Rhiwiau Caws

Rhiwiau Caws (Idwal Slabs) and the cliffs around the head of Cwm Idwal are a popular area for rock climbing; Rhiwiau Caws, on the eastern side of the Cwm, in particular are popular with inexperienced climbers learning their skills. They were first climbed in 1897 by Rose and Moss. Twll Du has some excellent ice climbing during the winter. The Cwm is also popular for hill walking and scrambling, given its proximity to Tryfan and Glyder Fach and Glyder Fawr and their profusion of rocky ridges.

In the mid-to-late 1950s and into the 1960s, this was the reunion excursion campsite of the first ascenders of Mount Everest and Kangchenjunga, held at Pen-y-Gwryd, many of whom were keen geologists and botanists.

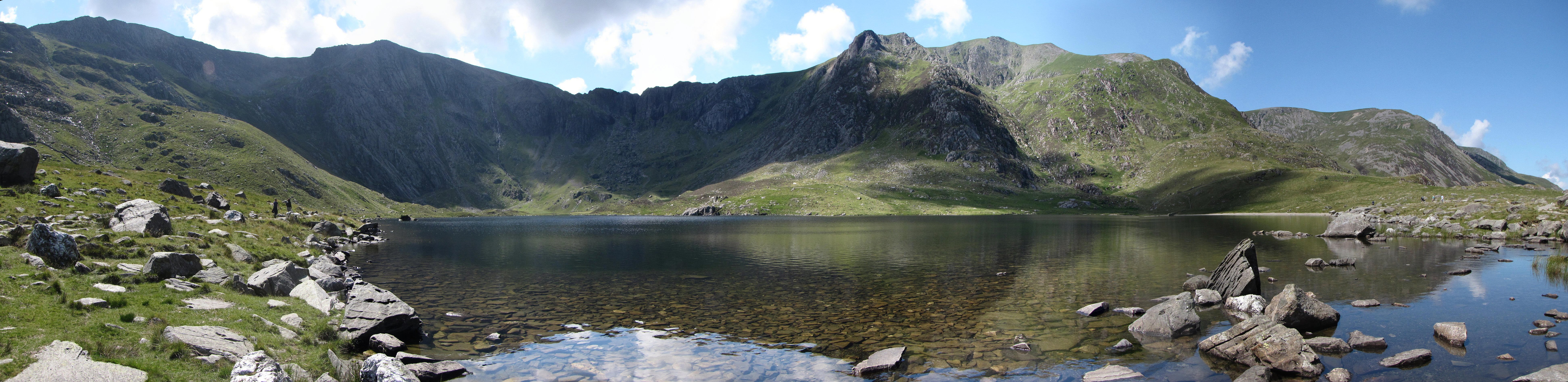
