= Llyn Ogwen =

Lake in northwestern Wales

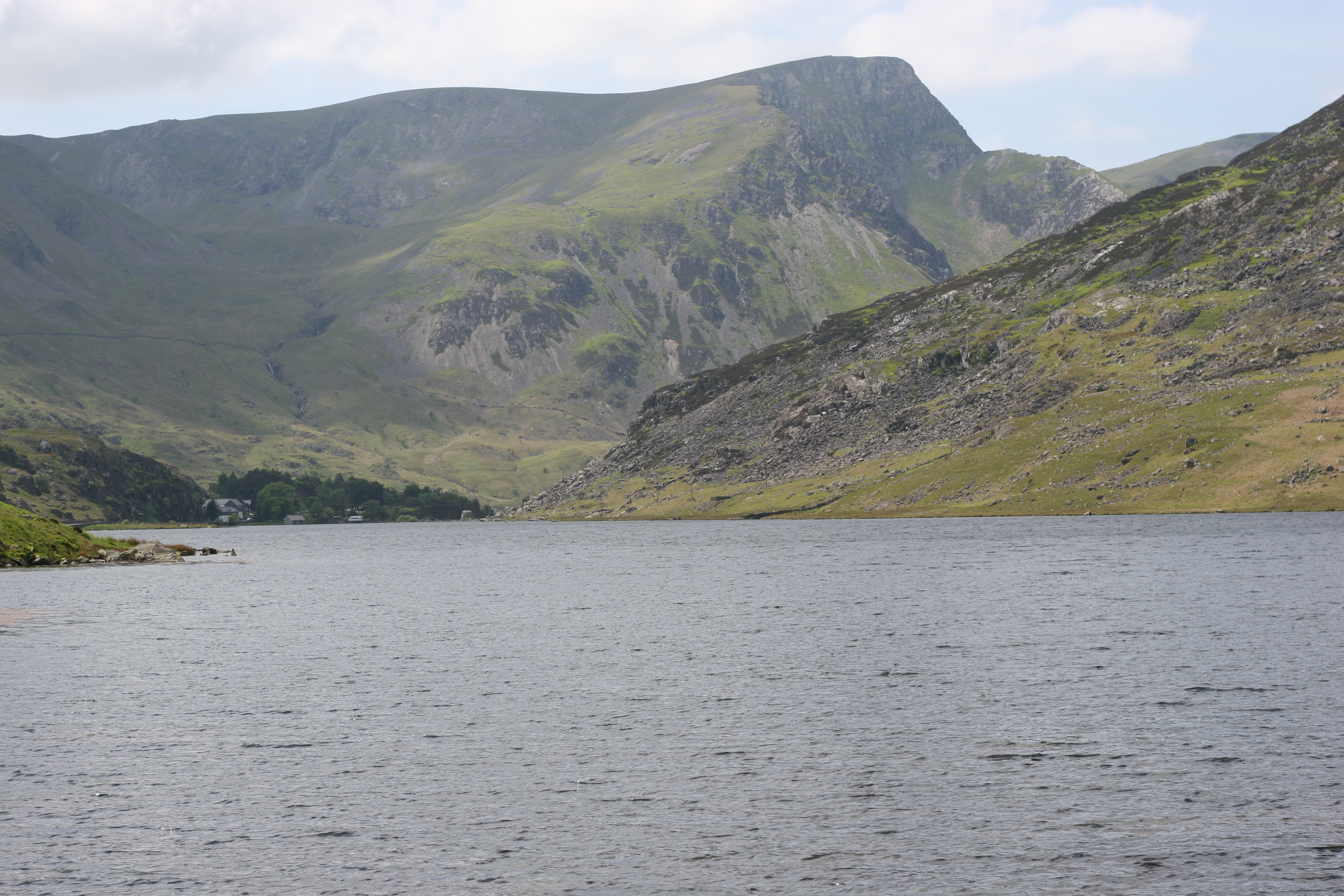
- looking north to Foel-goch

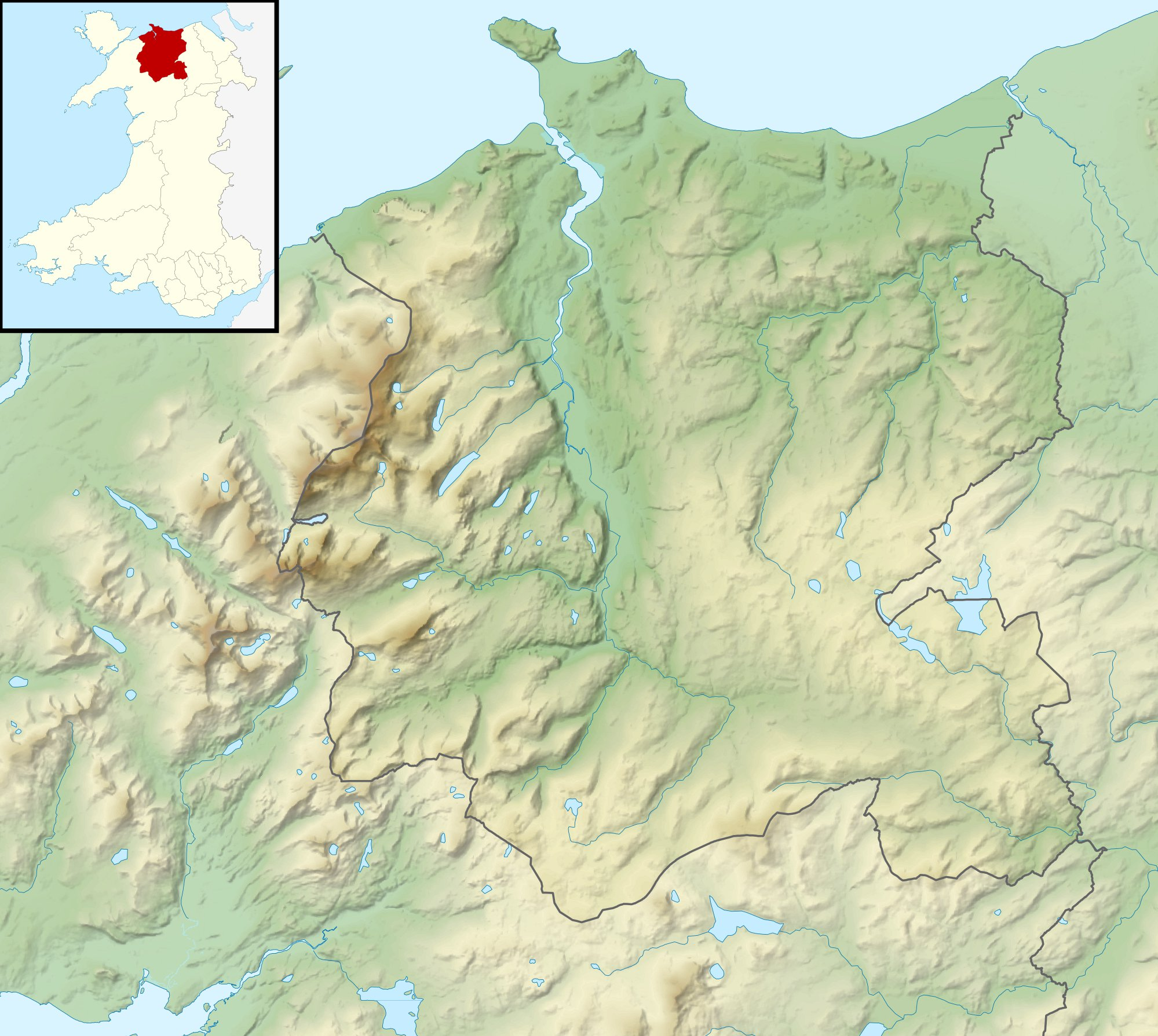
- Location within Conwy
- Location: North Wales
- Coordinates: 53°07.5′N 4°00′W
- Lake type: natural
- Primary inflows: Afon Lloer, Tryfan, Pen yr Ole Wen
- Primary outflows: River Ogwen
- Basin countries: United Kingdom
- Surface area: 78 acres (32 ha)
- Surface elevation: 310 m (1,020 ft)

Llyn Ogwen (Welsh: [ˈɬɪn ˈɔɡʊɛn]) is a ribbon lake in north-west Wales. It lies alongside the A5 road between two mountain ranges of Snowdonia, the Carneddau and the Glyderau. Somewhat unusually, the county boundary at this point is drawn so that the lake itself lies in the county of Gwynedd, but all the surrounding land (excluding the outflow) lies in Conwy County Borough.

Llyn Ogwen lies at a height of about 310 metres above sea level and has an area of 78 acres (320,000 m^{2}), but is a very shallow lake, with a maximum depth of only a little over 3 metres. It is fed by a number of streams from the slopes of the mountains which surround it, which include Tryfan and Pen yr Ole Wen. The largest of these streams is Afon Lloer, which flows from Ffynnon Lloer.

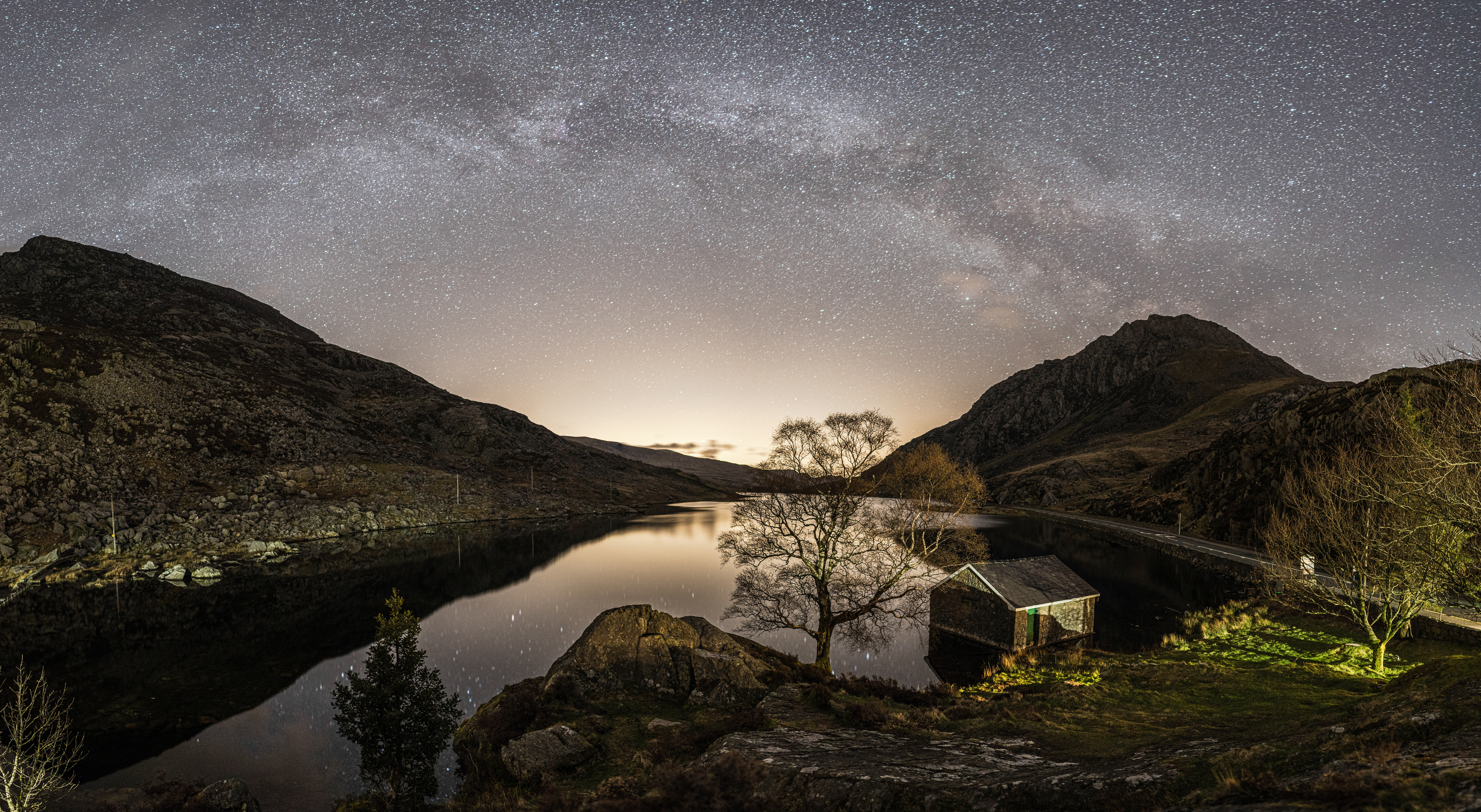
Llyn Ogwen at night

It is said that after the Battle of Camlann (King Arthur's final battle), Sir Bedivere (Bedwyr) cast the sword Excalibur into Llyn Ogwen, where it was caught by the Lady of the Lake. Tryfan is said to be Sir Bedivere's final resting-place. According to the writer Jonah Jones:

"J. M. Archer Thomson, a headmaster of Llandudno School and a pioneer rock climber in Snowdonia quotes a strange legend from a Welsh magazine concerning Llyn Ogwen. A Shepherd happened upon a cave in Craig Cwrwgl above the lake containing the treasure of King Arthur. In the midst of the commotion caused by this intrusion, he turned to the lake, and 'behold thereon a coracle in which sat three women of more than mortal beauty, but the dread aspect of the rower would have filled the stoutest heart with terror.' E. W. Steeple, who recorded this legend, suggests it 'seems a little obscure, and it may be that it has become involved with another story', probably that of Llyn Llydaw."

Llyn Ogwen is the source of the Afon Ogwen which flows north to reach the sea near Bangor. A dam was built in the Afon Ogwen at Ogwen Bank, in the early 20th century, to raise the level of the river in order to provide water for the use in the nearby Penrhyn Quarry. The lake is popular with anglers and is said to contain excellent trout.
