= List of highest mountains in Wales =

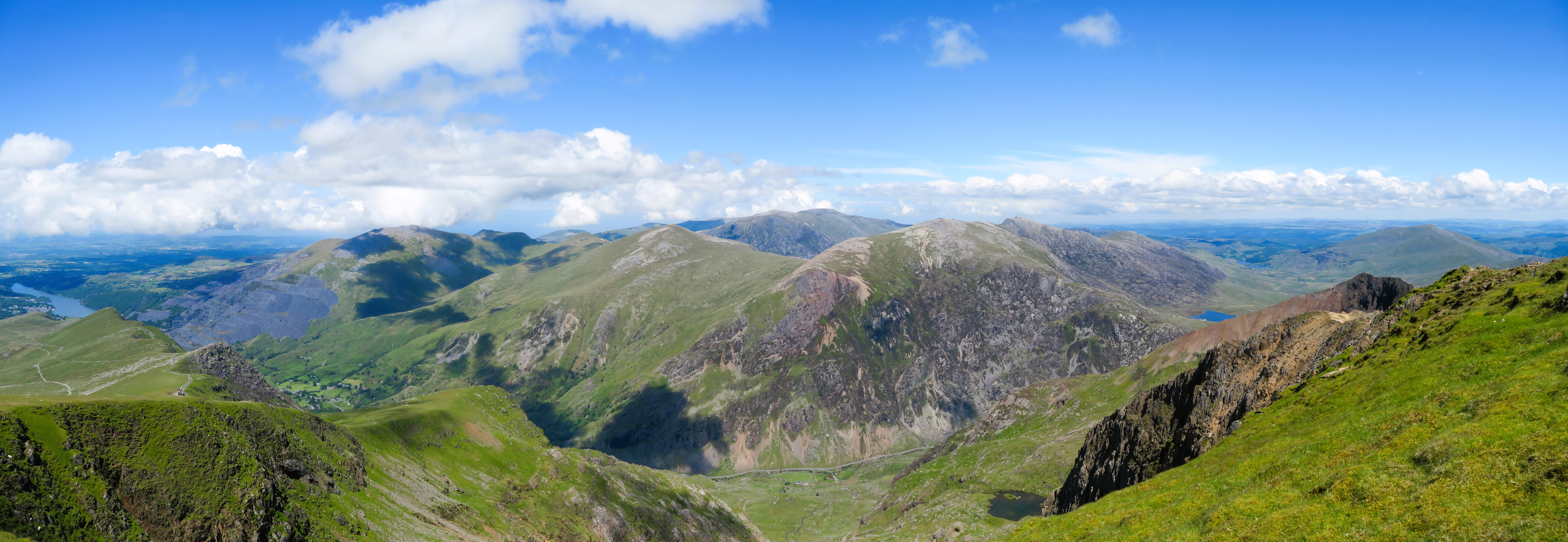
A view from Llanberis path

This is a list of the 50 highest mountains in Wales. The Welsh mountains are ranked highest first.

== List of highest mountains in Wales ==
Rank	Name (Welsh name)	Image	Height	Mountain range (Welsh name)	National Park (Welsh name)
1	Snowdon (Yr Wyddfa)		1,085 m (3,560 ft)	Snowdon Massif (Mynyddoedd Yr Wyddfa)	Snowdonia (Eryri)
2	Garnedd Ugain		1,065 m (3,494 ft)	Snowdon Massif (Mynyddoedd Yr Wyddfa)	Snowdonia (Eryri)
3	Carnedd Llewelyn		1,064 m (3,491 ft)	Carneddau	Snowdonia (Eryri)
4	Carnedd Dafydd		1,044 m (3,425 ft)	Carneddau	Snowdonia (Eryri)
5	Glyder Fawr		999 m (3,278 ft)	Glyderau	Snowdonia (Eryri)
6	Glyder Fach		994 m (3,261 ft)	Glyderau	Snowdonia (Eryri)
7	Pen yr Ole Wen		978 m (3,209 ft)	Carneddau	Snowdonia (Eryri)
8	Foel Grach		976 m (3,202 ft)	Carneddau	Snowdonia (Eryri)
9	Yr Elen		962 m (3,156 ft)	Carneddau	Snowdonia (Eryri)
10	Y Garn		947 m (3,107 ft)	Glyderau	Snowdonia (Eryri)
11	Foel Fras		942 m (3,091 ft)	Carneddau	Snowdonia (Eryri)
12	Carnedd Gwenllian		926 m (3,038 ft)	Carneddau	Snowdonia (Eryri)
13	Elidir Fawr		924 m (3,031 ft)	Glyderau	Snowdonia (Eryri)
14	Crib Goch		923 m (3,028 ft)	Snowdon Massif (Mynyddoedd Yr Wyddfa)	Snowdonia (Eryri)
15	Tryfan		915 m (3,002 ft)	Glyderau	Snowdonia (Eryri)
16	Aran Fawddwy		905 m (2,969 ft)	Aran	Snowdonia (Eryri)
17	Y Lliwedd		898 m (2,946 ft)	Snowdon Massif (Mynyddoedd Yr Wyddfa)	Snowdonia (Eryri)
18	Y Lliwedd East Peak		893 m (2,930 ft)	Snowdon Massif (Mynyddoedd Yr Wyddfa)	Snowdonia (Eryri)
19	Cadair Idris		893 m (2,930 ft)	Cadair Idris	Snowdonia (Eryri)
20	Pen y Fan		886 m (2,907 ft)	Brecon Beacons (Bannau Brycheiniog)	Brecon Beacons (Bannau Brycheiniog)
21	Aran Benllyn		885 m (2,904 ft)	Aran	Snowdonia (Eryri)
22	Corn Du		873 m (2,864 ft)	Brecon Beacons (Bannau Brycheiniog)	Brecon Beacons (Bannau Brycheiniog)
23	Erw y Ddafad-ddu		872 m (2,861 ft)	Aran	Snowdonia (Eryri)
24	Moel Siabod		872 m (2,861 ft)	Moelwynion	Snowdonia (Eryri)
25	Mynydd Moel		863 m (2,831 ft)	Cadair Idris	Snowdonia (Eryri)
26	Arenig Fawr		854m (2,802 ft)	Arenig	Snowdonia (Eryri)
27	Llwytmor		849m (2,785 ft)	Carneddau	Snowdonia (Eryri)
28	Pen yr Helgi Du		833m (2,733 ft)	Carneddau	Snowdonia (Eryri)
29	Foel-goch		831m (2,726 ft)	Glyderau	Snowdonia (Eryri)
30	Arenig Fawr(south peak)		830m (2723 ft)	Arenig	Snowdonia (Eryri)
31	Cadair Berwyn		830m (2723 ft)	Berwyn	none
32	Cadair Berwyn(north peak)		827m (2713 ft)	Berwyn	none
33	Moel Sych		827m (2713 ft)	Berwyn	none
34	Carnedd y Filiast		821m (2694 ft)	Glyderau	Snowdonia (Eryri)
35	Lliwedd Bach		818m (2684 ft)	Snowdon Massif (Mynyddoedd Yr Wyddfa)	Snowdonia (Eryri)
36	Mynydd Perfedd		812m (2664 ft)	Glyderau	Snowdonia (Eryri)
37	Cyfrwy		811m (2661 ft)	Cadair Idris	Snowdonia (Eryri)
38	Waun Fach		811m (2661 ft)	Black Mountains	Brecon Beacons (Bannau Brycheiniog)
39	Bera Bach		807m (2648 ft)	Carneddau	Snowdonia (Eryri)
40	Y Foel Goch		805m (2641 ft)	Glyderau	Snowdonia (Eryri)
41	Fan Brycheiniog		802m (2631 ft)	Brecon Beacons (Bannau Brycheiniog)	Brecon Beacons (Bannau Brycheiniog)
42	Pen y Gadair Fawr		800m (2625 ft)	Black Mountains	Brecon Beacons (Bannau Brycheiniog)
43	Pen Llithrig y Wrach		799m (2621 ft)	Carneddau	Snowdonia (Eryri)
44	Foel Meirch		795m (2608 ft)	Carneddau	Snowdonia (Eryri)
45	Cribyn		795m (2608 ft)	Brecon Beacons (Bannau Brycheiniog)	Brecon Beacons (Bannau Brycheiniog)
46	Bera Mawr		794m (2605 ft)	Carneddau	Snowdonia (Eryri)
47	Craig Cwm Amarch		791m (2595 ft)	Cadair Idris	Snowdonia (Eryri)
48	Cadair Bronwen		785m (2575 ft)	Berwyn	none
49	Moel Hebog		783m (2569 ft)	Hebog	Snowdonia (Eryri)
50	Glasgwm		780m (2559 ft)	Aran	Snowdonia (Eryri)
