= Craig Eigiau =

Hill in Conwy County Borough, Wales

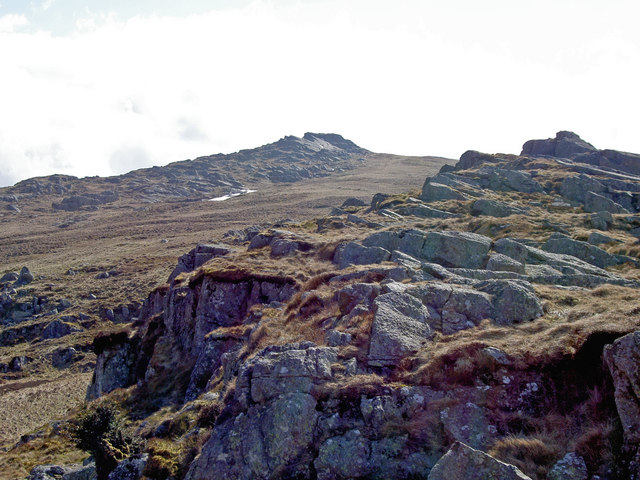
- Craig Eigiau summit rocks

Highest point
- Elevation: 735 m (2,411 ft)
- Prominence: 20 m (66 ft)
- Parent peak: Carnedd Llewelyn
- Listing: sub Hewitt, Nuttall
- Coordinates: 53°10′27″N 3°57′48″W

Geography
- Location: Conwy / Gwynedd, Wales
- Parent range: Snowdonia
- OS grid: SH689659
- Topo map: OS Landranger 115

Craig Eigiau is a top of Foel Grach in the Carneddau range in Snowdonia, North Wales, Wales, lying above Llyn Eigiau.

It is located on a broad ridge extending eastwards from Foel Grach, leading to a large peaty plateau, Gledrfordd, which ends with the cliffs of Craig Eigiau. The summit consists of a large rocky outcrop. Good views of Garnedd Uchaf, Foel-fras, Carnedd Llewelyn, Pen yr Helgi Du, Pen Llithrig y Wrach, Creigiau Gleision and Pen y Castell are observed.
