= Cwm Caseg =

Valley in Gwynedd, Wales

Coordinates: 53.1797180000°N 4.0512150000°W

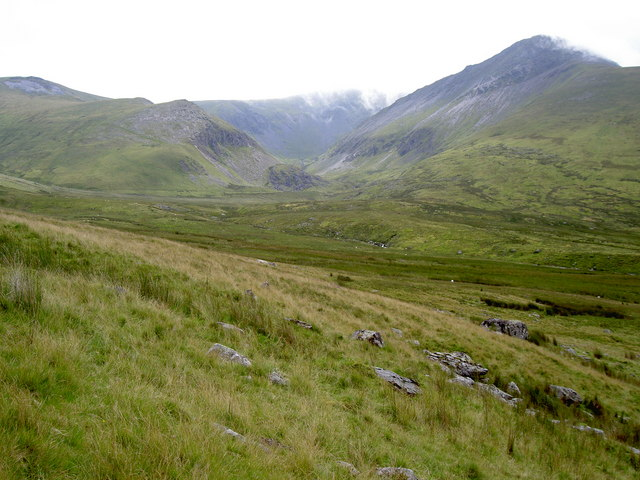
Looking across Afon Caseg towards Cwm Caseg

Cwm Caseg is a broad glacial valley in Snowdonia leading west from the Carneddau towards Bethesda. It is bordered by Carnedd Llewelyn to the southeast, Yr Elen to the west, and Foel Grach to the northeast. It contains a small lake, Ffynnon Caseg.
