= Drosgl =

Coordinates: 53.18295°N 3.96630°W

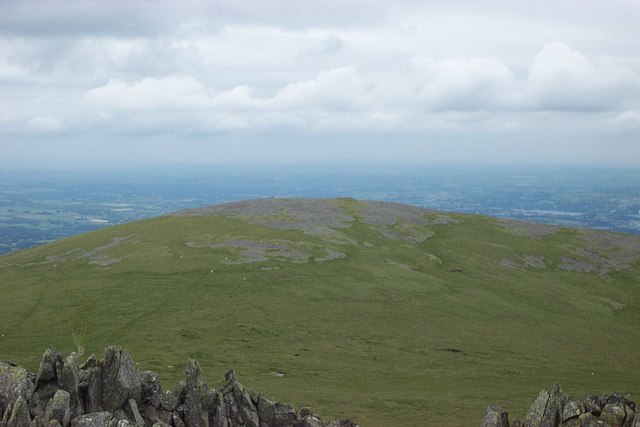
- Drosgl from Bera Bach

Highest point
- Elevation: 757 m (2,484 ft)
- Prominence: 37 m (121 ft)
- Parent peak: Foel-fras
- Listing: Hewitt, Nuttall

Geography
- Location: Snowdonia, Wales
- OS grid: SH664680

Listed summits of Drosgl
Name	Grid ref	Height	Status
Gyrn Wigau		643 m (2,110 ft)	Nuttall

Y Drosgl is a summit of the Carneddau range in Snowdonia, Wales, and forms a part of the western Carneddau, also known as the Berau, meaning 'stacks' or 'ricks'. It lies on a ridge heading west from Carnedd Gwenllian and Bera Mawr towards Bethesda. A large ancient burial cairn, dating from the Bronze Age, adorns the summit, from where good views of Cwm Caseg and the Menai can be seen.
