= Berau =

Berau may refer to:

Indonesia

- Berau Regency, a regency in East Kalimantan, Indonesia
- Berau Sultanate, in the area of the Berau Regency
- Berau Malays or Berau people, an ethnic group in East Kalimantan
- Berau Malay language, language spoken by the Berau people in East Kalimantan

elsewhere

- Mountains Bera Bach and Bera Mawr in North Wales — the pair is called 'the Berau'
