= Llewelyn Volcanic Group =

- Stratigraphic range: Caradoc Ordovician
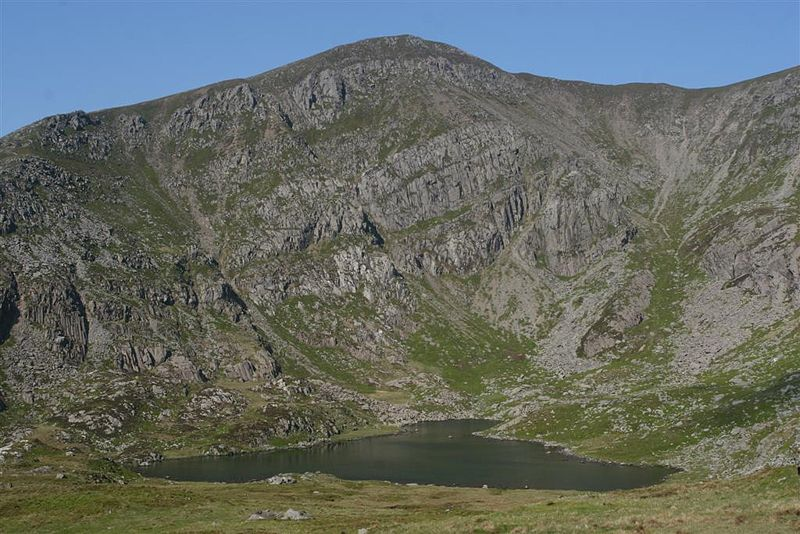
- Rhyolitic ash-flow tuffs of the Capel Curig Volcanic Formation exposed on the northeastern face of Pen yr Ole Wen, capped by sandstones of the overlying Cwm Eigiau Formation, which can be seen at the top of the face
- Type: Group
- Sub-units: Capel Curig Volcanic Formation, Foel Fras Volcanic Formation, Conwy Rhyolite Volcanic Formation, Foel Grach Basalt Formation, Braich Tu Du Volcanic Formation
- Underlies: Cwm Eigiau Formation
- Overlies: Nant Ffrancon Formation
- Thickness: approx 1400m

Lithology
- Primary: ash flow tuffs
- Other: rhyolites, mudstones, siltstones, sandstones, breccias etc

Location
- Region: northwest Wales
- Country: Wales

Type section
- Named for: Carnedd Llewelyn

The Llewelyn Volcanic Group is an Ordovician lithostratigraphic group (a sequence of rock strata) in Snowdonia, north-west Wales. The name is derived from Carnedd Llewelyn, the highest peak in the Carneddau range where it outcrops.

== Outcrops ==
The rocks occur across the Snowdon massif and the Carneddau and within the Capel Curig Anticline.

== Lithology and stratigraphy ==
The Group comprises around 1400m thickness of ash flow tuffs, flow-banded rhyolites and breccias with a variety of volcaniclastic sediments erupted or sedimented during the Caradocian epoch of the Ordovician period. The Group comprises (in descending order, i.e. oldest last):

- Capel Curig Volcanic Formation
- Foel Fras Volcanic Formation
- Conwy Rhyolite Volcanic Formation

It also includes the Foel Grach Basalt Formation and the Braich Tu Du Volcanic Formation.
