= Bera Mawr =

Mountain in United Kingdom

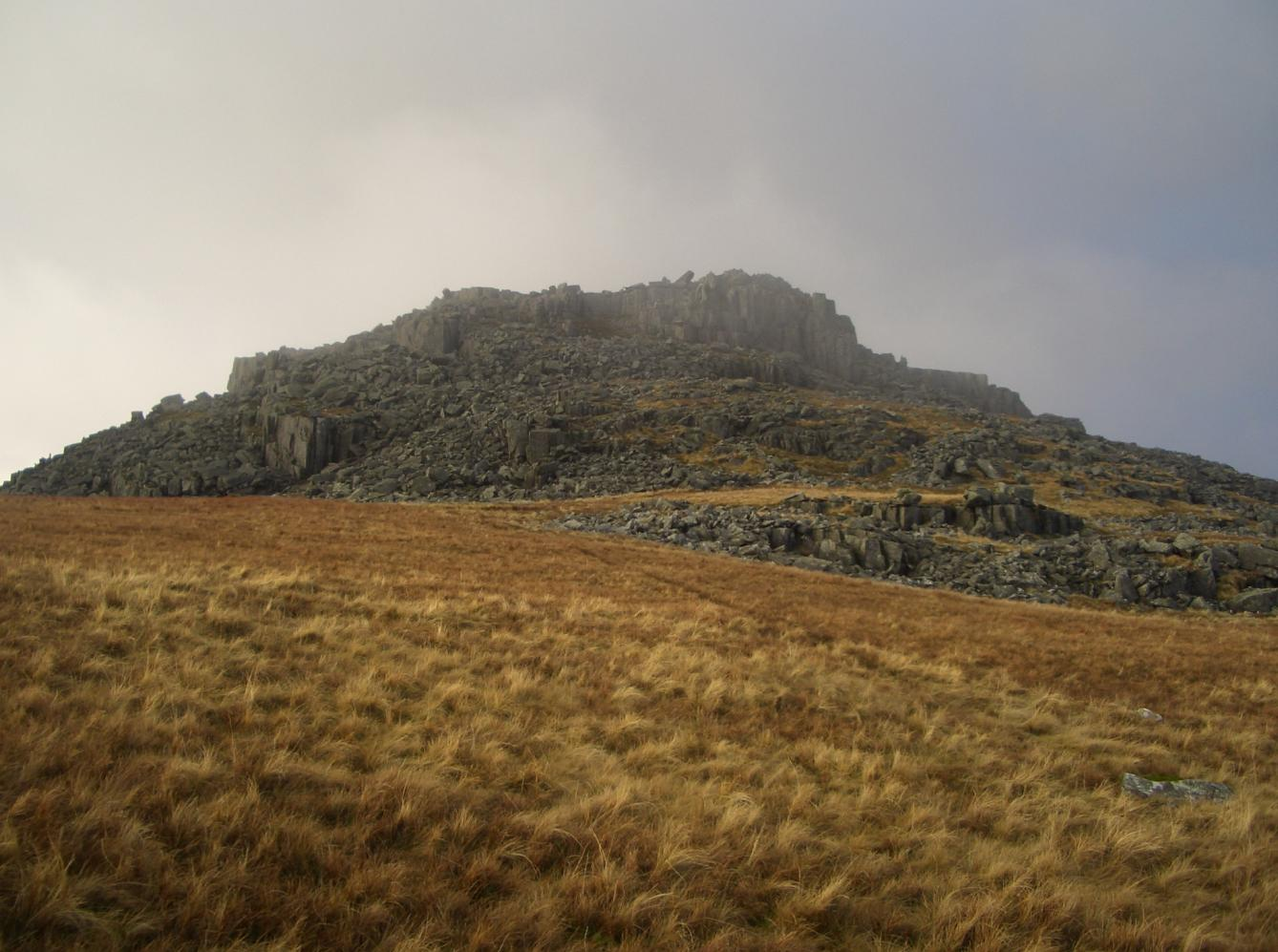
- Bera Mawr summit tor

Highest point
- Elevation: 794 m (2,605 ft)
- Prominence: 30 m (98 ft)
- Parent peak: Carnedd Llewelyn
- Listing: Hewitt, Nuttall
- Coordinates: 53°12′25″N 3°56′09″W

Geography
- Location within Gwynedd
- Location: Gwynedd, Wales
- Parent range: Snowdonia

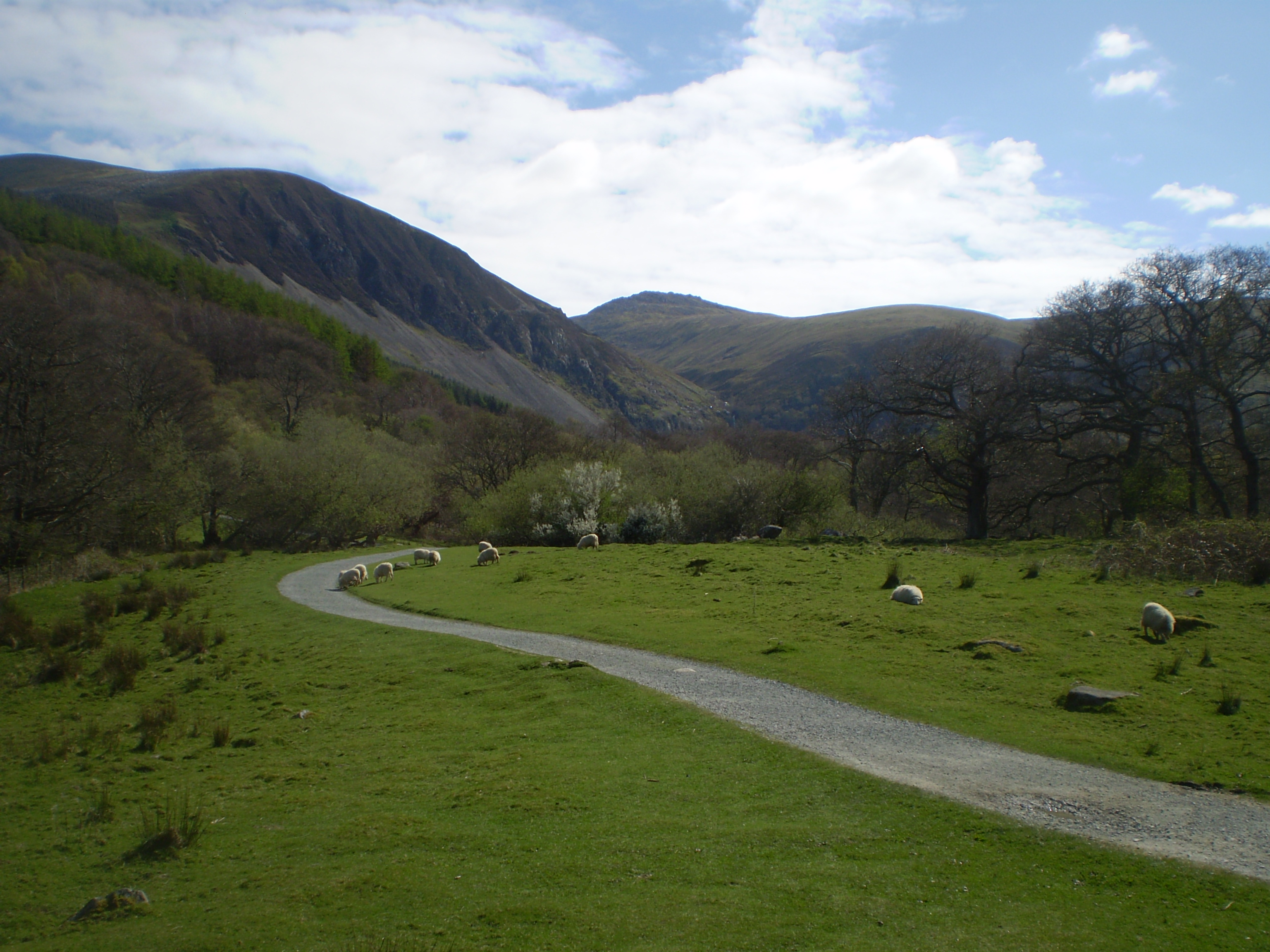
Bera Mawr from the path to Aber Falls

Bera Mawr is a summit in the Carneddau mountains in north Wales, height 794 metres. It and Bera Bach are together known as the Berau, or northern Carneddau. The summit is a large rock tor, characteristic of the western Carneddau. There are views of Llwytmor and Foel-fras to the north-east, Garnedd Uchaf to the south-east, Bera Bach to the south, Drosgl to the west and the Menai to the north-west.

The Berau lie to the northwest of the two highest mountains in the Carneddau range: Carnedd Llewelyn and Carnedd Dafydd, both are named after 13th century Princes of Wales, Llywelyn the Great (1172-1240), and his grandson Prince Dafydd ap Gruffudd (1238-1283). It was in a bog in the northern foothills of Bera Mawr, at a place called Nanhysglain, that Prince Dafydd ap Gruffudd and his family were betrayed and captured in June 1283 during the Conquest of Wales by Edward I. In October, Dafydd was executed at Shrewsbury on the orders of Edward I. His death marked the end of the 700-year rule of Gwynedd by the family descended from Cunedda Wledig and an independent Wales.
