= Bera Bach =

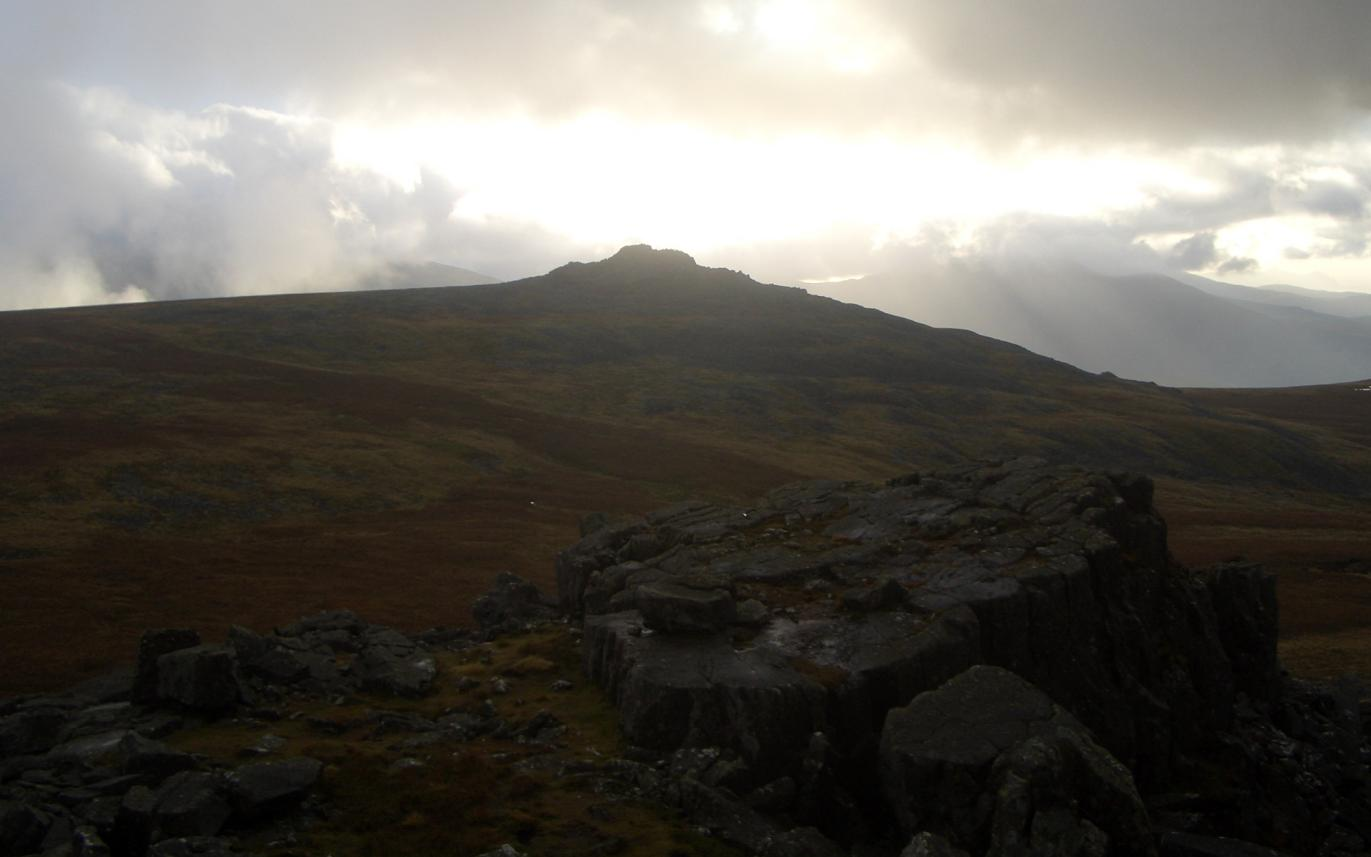
- Bera Bach from the summit rocks of Bera Mawr

Highest point
- Elevation: 807 m (2,648 ft)
- Prominence: 18 m (59 ft)
- Parent peak: Carnedd Llewelyn
- Listing: sub Hewitt, Nuttall
- Coordinates: 53°12′25″N 3°56′09″W

Geography
- Location within Wales
- Location: Gwynedd, Wales
- Parent range: Snowdonia

Bera Bach is a summit, height 807 metres, in the Carneddau mountains in north Wales. It is part of a ridge leading west from Garnedd Uchaf. The summit is a rocky tor, characteristic of the northern Carneddau. Bera Mawr and Bera Bach are together known as the Berau, meaning 'ricks' or 'stacks'. They are both excellent examples of the area's tors. To the west, the ridge continues to Drosgl. Despite Bach in Welsh meaning small, it is higher than Bera Mawr (mawr in Welsh meaning 'big').

Bera Bach can be climbed either from Aber Falls, or alternatively from Bethesda via Gyrn Wigau and Drosgl.
