= Carneddau ponies =

Breed of small Welsh Mountain ponies

Carneddau ponies are a breed of small Welsh Mountain ponies, present in the Carneddau mountains in north Wales, in Snowdonia (Eryri). They stand at 10-11 hands, and in 2013, DNA identification revealed that they are a distinct, unique and ancient breed having been isolated in the Carneddau for centuries. "Clare Winton, an IBERS post-graduate student at Aberystwyth University who performed the study as part of her Ph.D thesis, revealed: "Although the Carneddau ponies have shared ancestry with the Welsh Section A pony, they exhibit genetic signatures such as unique mutations while maintaining high genetic diversity, demonstrating that the population has been isolated for at least several hundred years. Therefore, the Carneddau ponies are a genetically distinct population".

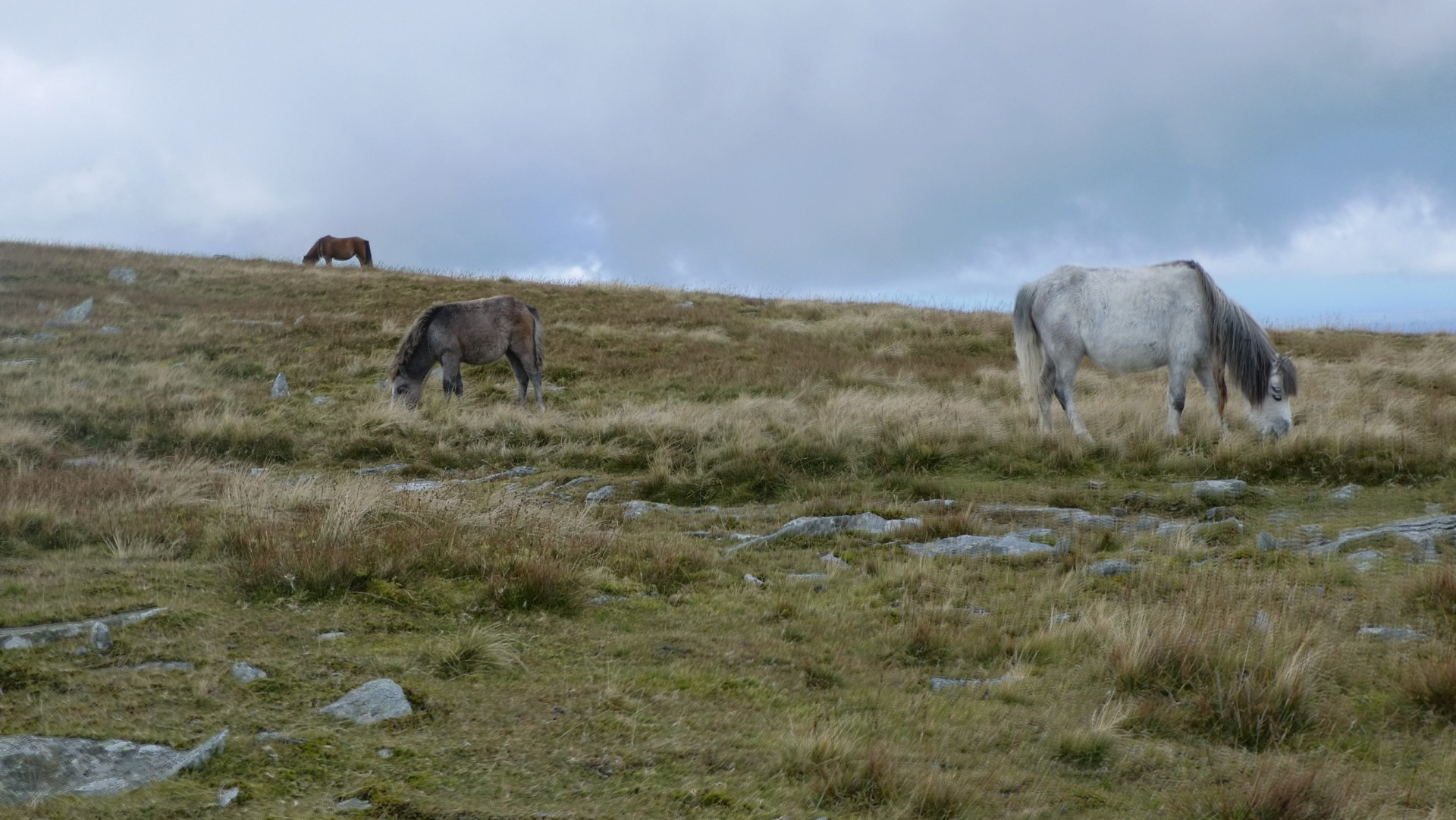
A group of Carneddau ponies on top of Foel-fras

Clare Winton's thesis "Genetic diversity and phylogenetic analysis of native mountain ponies of Britain and Ireland reveal a novel rare population" where she and her colleagues state: "Our results establish that the feral Carneddau ponies represent a unique and distinctive population that merits recognition as a defined population and conservation priority". The population of the Carneddau ponies is in the hundreds [2020] but fluctuates according to the weather. In 2013 hundreds died in the heavy snow of that winter, but the population recovered within a few years.

Carneddau ponies are not given supplementary feed like some semi-feral ponies and have "a wider, diet than domestic ponies, [and ] will eat soft rush, Molinia, gorse and mountain grasses."

They can feed themselves in winter by scraping the snow of the grass, a trait shared only with other British isles ponies, but done more often as they get no supplementary feed. (See this in the BBC's Winter heroes from the winter of 2020/21.)

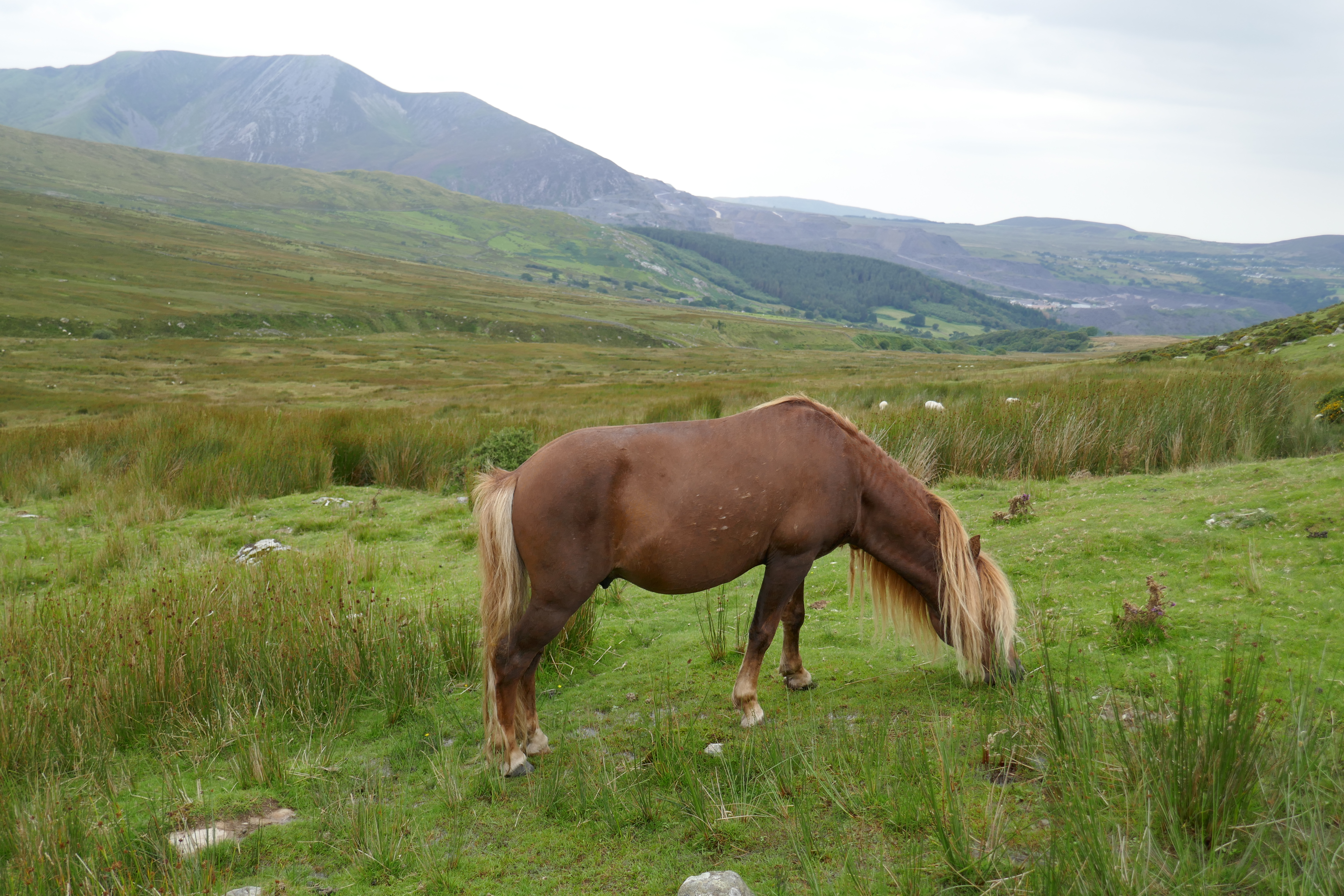
Carneddau pony

The ponies, while semi-feral, are owned by seven local families who once a year round them up for health checks and to allow some ponies to be sold to keep the herd in balance. In the past the Carneddau ponies were sold for working use, e.g. as pit ponies, but now are sold only for leisure.

These families are grouped in the Carneddau Pony Society, of whom Gareth Wyn Jones is the leading spokesperson and protector of the herd. (See him being interviewed here: "Wild as the Hills – The protection of the Carneddau Mountain wild ponies")
