= Welsh 3000s =

15 mountains in Wales with a height over 3,000 feet (914.4 m)

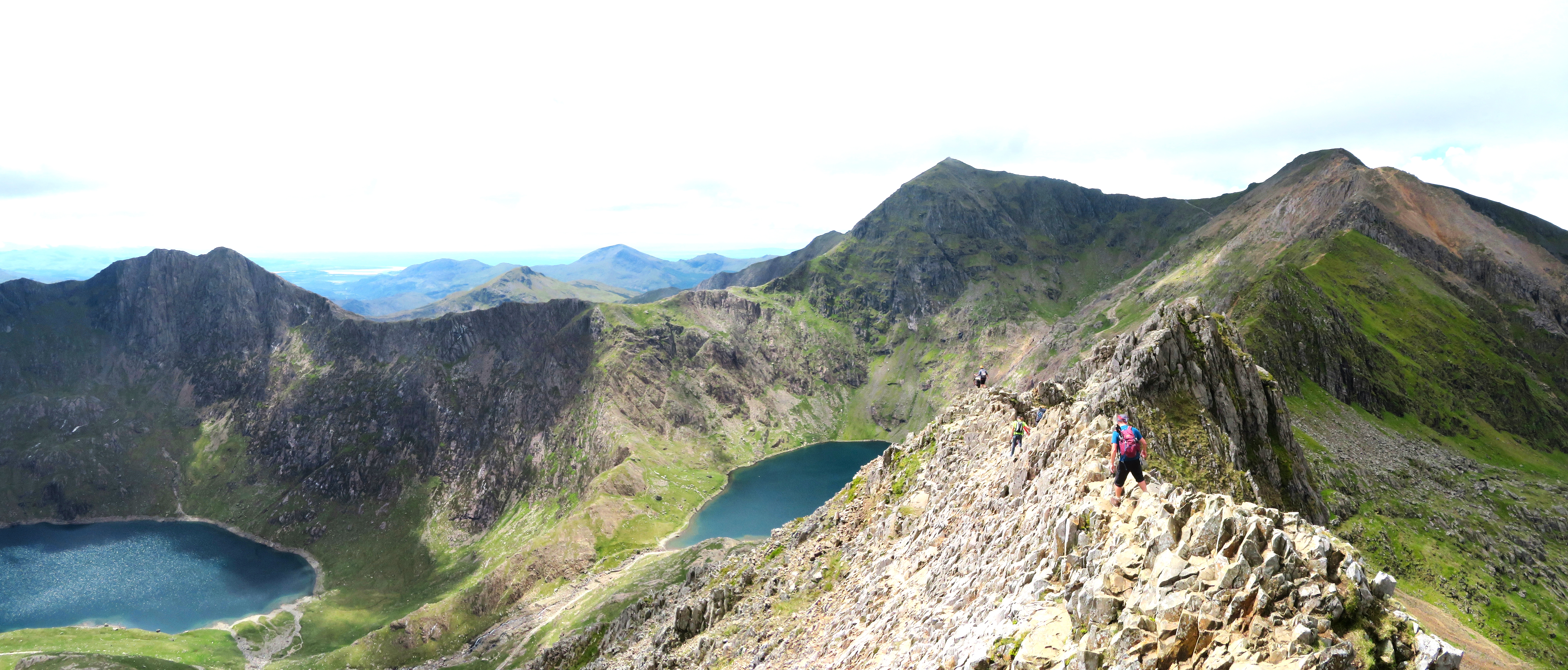
Snowdon (Yr Wyddfa) from Crib Goch, Snowdonia

The Welsh 3000s are the 15 Welsh Munros. These are mountains in Wales that are over 3,000 feet (914.4 m). Geographically they fall within three ranges (the Snowdon Massif, the Glyderau, and the Carneddau), but close enough to make it possible to reach all 15 summits within 24 hours, a challenge known as the Welsh 3000s challenge.

== Background ==
The length of this challenge (from the first peak to the last) is about 26 miles (42 km), but including the walk to and from any start point, it will total some 30 miles (48 km). Most people undertaking the challenge walk it, and many achieve it in much less than 24 hours. The record for the challenge (from first peak to last) stands at 4 hours 10 minutes and 48 seconds, set by Finlay Wild in 2019. On 5 August 1989 a ladies' record was set by Angela Carson with a time of 5 hours 28 minutes and 21 seconds. On 17/18 June 1978 John Wagstaff of West Bromwich Mountaineering Club completed a triple crossing in 22 hours 49 minutes, a feat which has yet to be repeated.

The walk is also known as "The 14 Peaks": Carnedd Gwenllian (or "Garnedd Uchaf") is not always included, as it has the least relative height, being little more than a bump on the ridge rather than a separate summit in its own right. Many people choose to make the small diversion to include it on their traverse. There is also an option to include a sixteenth top, Castell y Gwynt in the Glyder range, which has been reclassified as a Nuttall since a survey in 2007.

The Snowdonia Society maintains a public database of persons visiting the 14 peaks in a single journey.

== The Challenge ==
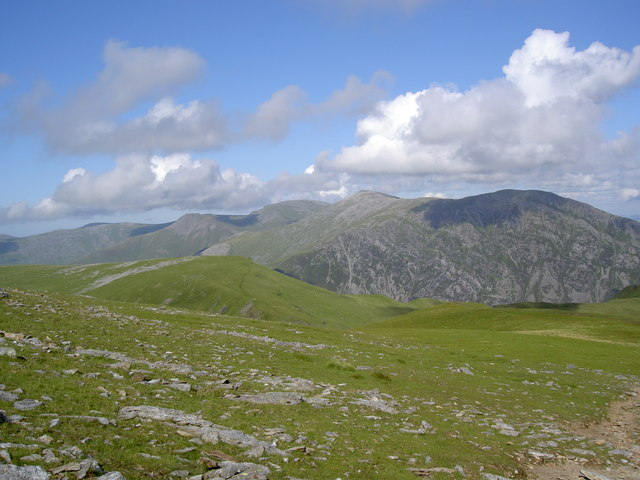
The south-western end of the Carneddau range viewed from Elidir Fach, in the Glyderau range.

The Welsh 3000s Challenge involves standing on top of all the 3000 ft peaks within 24 hours, using no transport. While challengers can choose any route and summit the mountains in any order, anyone seeking to beat the record must start on Snowdon. Many walkers and runners prefer the alternative route, starting with Crib Goch, then visiting Garnedd Ugain before summiting Snowdon. Given that the climb up Snowdon makes up for about 23% of the total ascent, and clock doesn't start until you leave Snowdon's summit, this alternative route does miss out on an opportunity to rest after completing what is the biggest climb of the day. Some challengers ascend Snowdon the night before, and sleep on the summit; others use the Mountain Railway to ascend Snowdon. Those who wish to climb all the mountains, rather than just standing at all the summits, often choose the Crib Goch route, starting at Pen-y-pass.

List of peaks
Range	Name(s)	Height		Grid Ref.	Notes
Range	Name(s)	Feet	Metres	Grid Ref.	Notes
Snowdon	Snowdon/Yr Wyddfa	3560	1085	609543	
Snowdon	Garnedd Ugain/Crib y Ddysgl	3494	1065	611552	
Snowdon	Crib Goch	3028	923	624552	
Glyderau	Elidir Fawr	3031	924	610613	
Glyderau	Y Garn	3106	947	631595	
Glyderau	Glyder Fawr	3284	1001	643579	
Glyderau	Castell y Gwynt	3188	972	654582	If included
Glyderau	Glyder Fach	3261	994	657583	
Glyderau	Tryfan	3011	918	664593	
Carneddau	Pen yr Ole Wen	3208	978	655619	
Carneddau	Carnedd Dafydd	3425	1044	663630	
Carneddau	Carnedd Llewelyn	3491	1064	684645	
Carneddau	Yr Elen	3156	962	673651	
Carneddau	Foel Grach	3202	976	688658	
Carneddau	Carnedd Gwenllian	3038	926	687670	If included
Carneddau	Foel-fras	3090	942	697682	

== See also ==
- List of highest mountains in Wales
