= Foel Meirch =

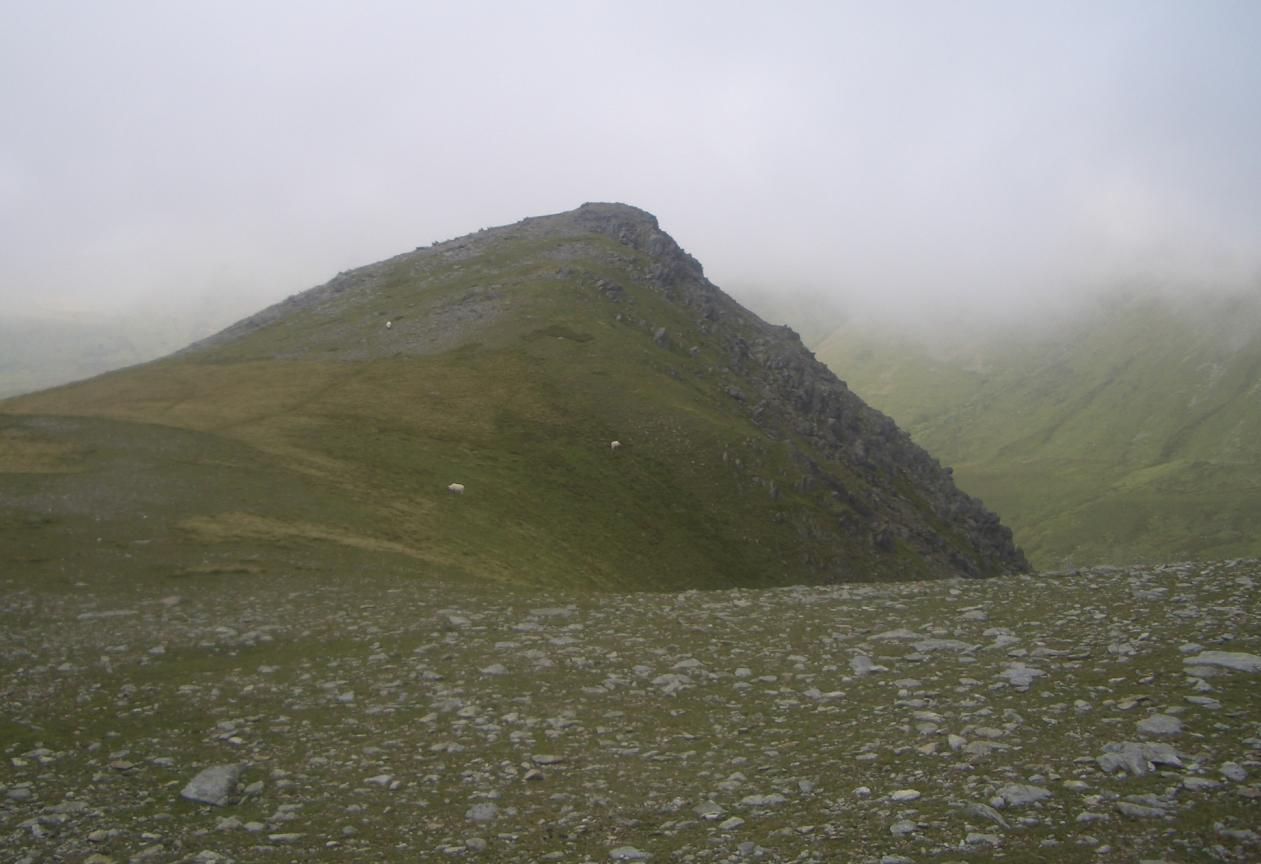
- Foel Meirch from the col connecting it to Carnedd Dafydd

Highest point
- Elevation: 800 m (2,600 ft)
- Prominence: 15 m (49 ft)
- Parent peak: Carnedd Dafydd
- Listing: Nuttall
- Coordinates: 53.14729°N 4.00205°W

Geography
- Location: Gwynedd, Wales
- Parent range: Snowdonia
- OS grid: SH662630

Foel Meirch is a top of Carnedd Dafydd in the Carneddau range in Snowdonia, North Wales. It offers commanding views of Carnedd Llewelyn and Yr Elen, and the Ysgolion Duon Cliffs.
