= Llyn Llyffant =

Lake in Conwy County Borough, Wales

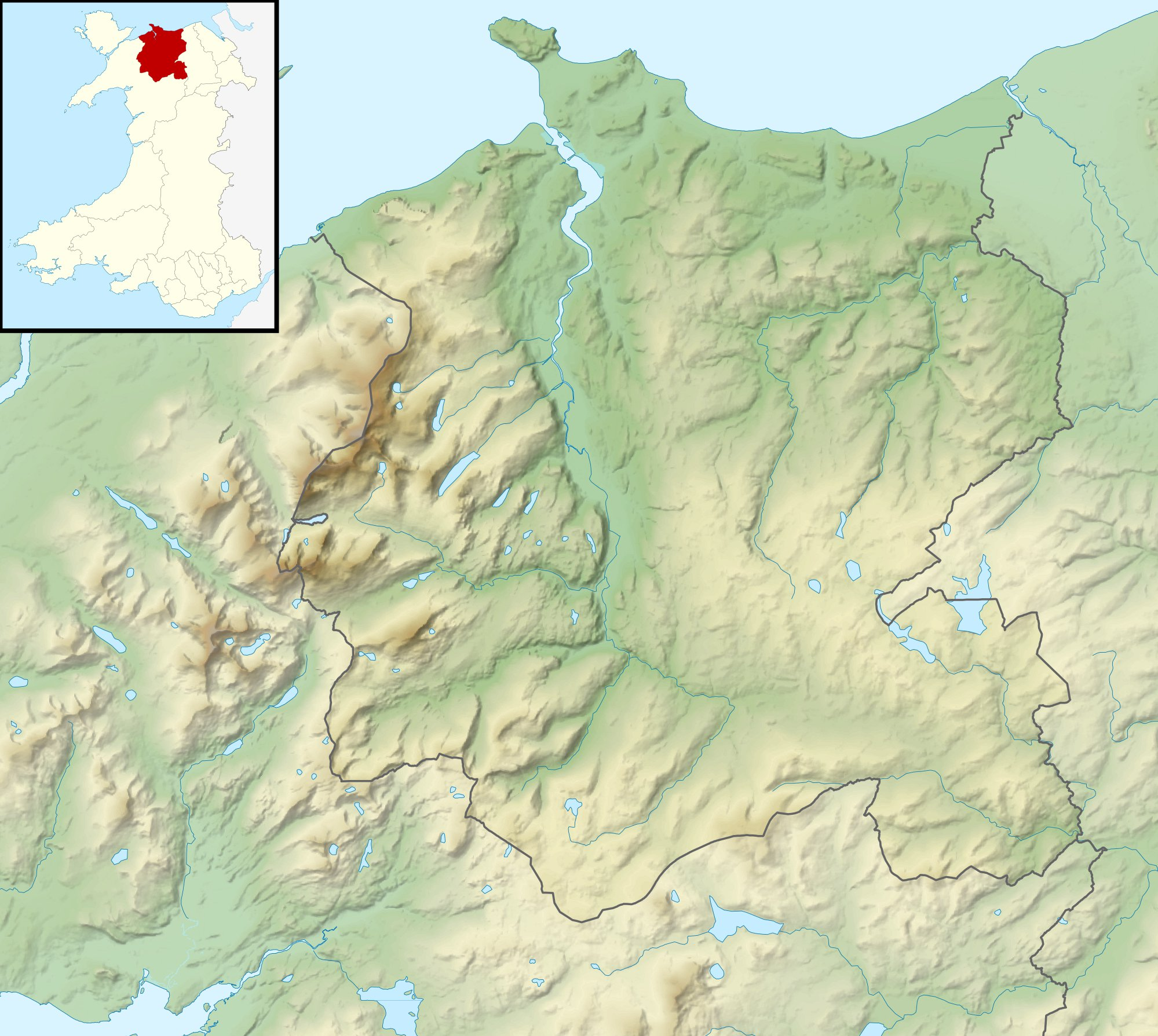
- Location within Conwy
- Location: near to Carnedd Llewelyn, Conwy County Borough, Wales
- Coordinates: 53°09′43″N 3°57′49″W
- Basin countries: United Kingdom

Llyn Llyffant is the highest lake in Wales, (although in reality the size of a large pond), located at grid reference SH 687 645. Its name translates into English as "frog lake". It lies at an elevation of approximately 815m above sea level.
