= Pen Llithrig y Wrach =

Mountain in Conwy County Borough, Wales

Coordinates: 53.14233°N 3.92108°W

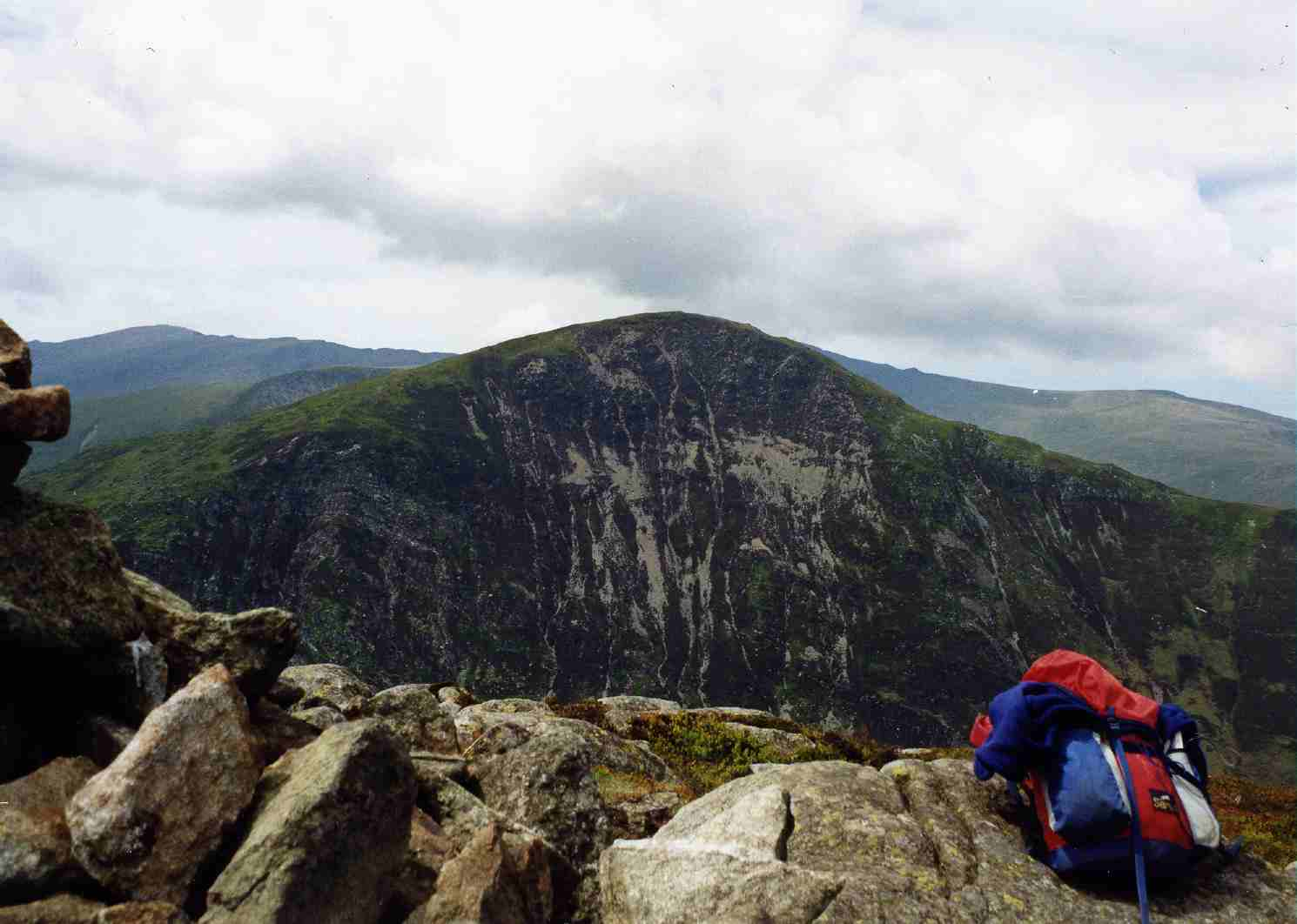
- Pen Llithrig y wrach seen across Llyn Cowlyd from Creigiau Gleision

Highest point
- Elevation: 799 m (2,621 ft)
- Prominence: 180 m (590 ft)
- Parent peak: Carnedd Llewelyn
- Listing: Marilyn, Hewitt, Nuttall

Naming
- English translation: slippery peak of the witch
- Language of name: Welsh
- Pronunciation: Welsh: [pɛn ˈɬɪθrɪɡ ə ˈwraːχ]

Geography
- Location: Conwy, Wales
- Parent range: Snowdonia
- OS grid: SH716623
- Topo map: OS Landranger 115

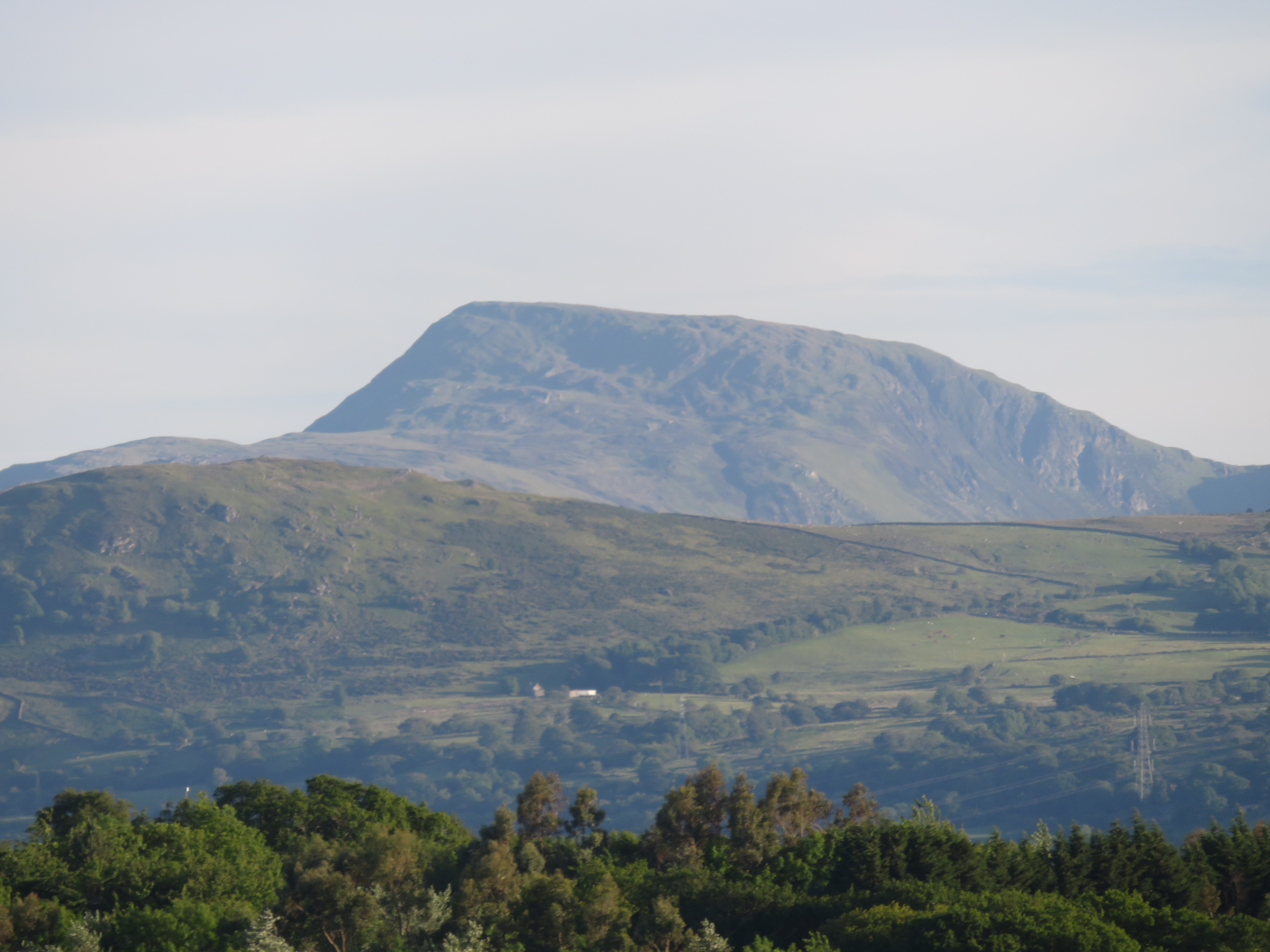
Pen Llithrig y Wrach from Conwy

Pen Llithrig y Wrach ('Slippery Head/Top of the Witch') is a mountain peak in Snowdonia, North Wales. It is one of the four Marilyns that make up the Carneddau range. To the east is Creigiau Gleision, another Marilyn, while to the west are Pen yr Helgi Du and Carnedd Llewelyn. Craig Eigiau and Llyn Eigiau can be seen to the north, while Gallt yr Ogof, Glyder Fach and Tryfan can be viewed to the south.

It has one of the more colourful names of any British mountain, translating as slippery peak of the witch, perhaps in reference to the boggy conditions underfoot, or because of the resemblance of its pointed profile to an archetypal witch's hat.

It is an outlier of the Carneddau, the higher peaks of which can be reached from Pen Llithrig y Wrach via Pen yr Helgi Du. On its eastern side, the mountain slopes steeply down to Llyn Cowlyd.

It may be climbed from the southern side, from Capel Curig or the A5, or from the north-east, from Dolgarrog or Tal-y-bont in the Conwy valley. It is quite prominent when viewed from the north near Llandudno.
