= Llwytmor =

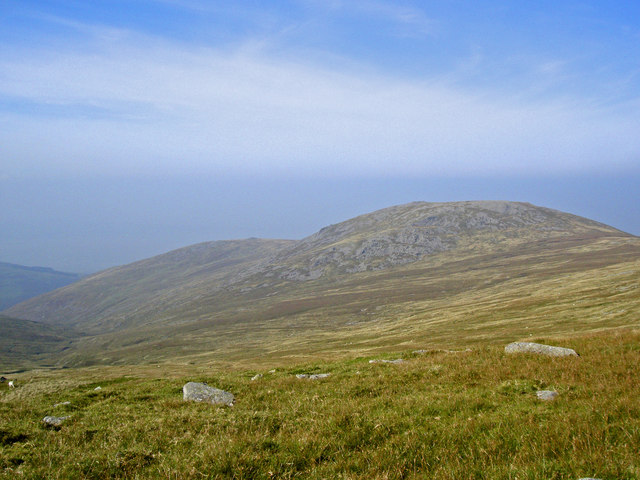
- Llwytmor from Garnedd Uchaf

Highest point
- Elevation: 849 m (2,785 ft)
- Prominence: 73 m (240 ft)
- Parent peak: Carnedd Llewelyn
- Listing: Hewitt, Nuttall
- Coordinates: 53.2046°N 3.9650°W

Geography
- Location: Snowdonia, Wales
- Topo map: OS Landranger 115

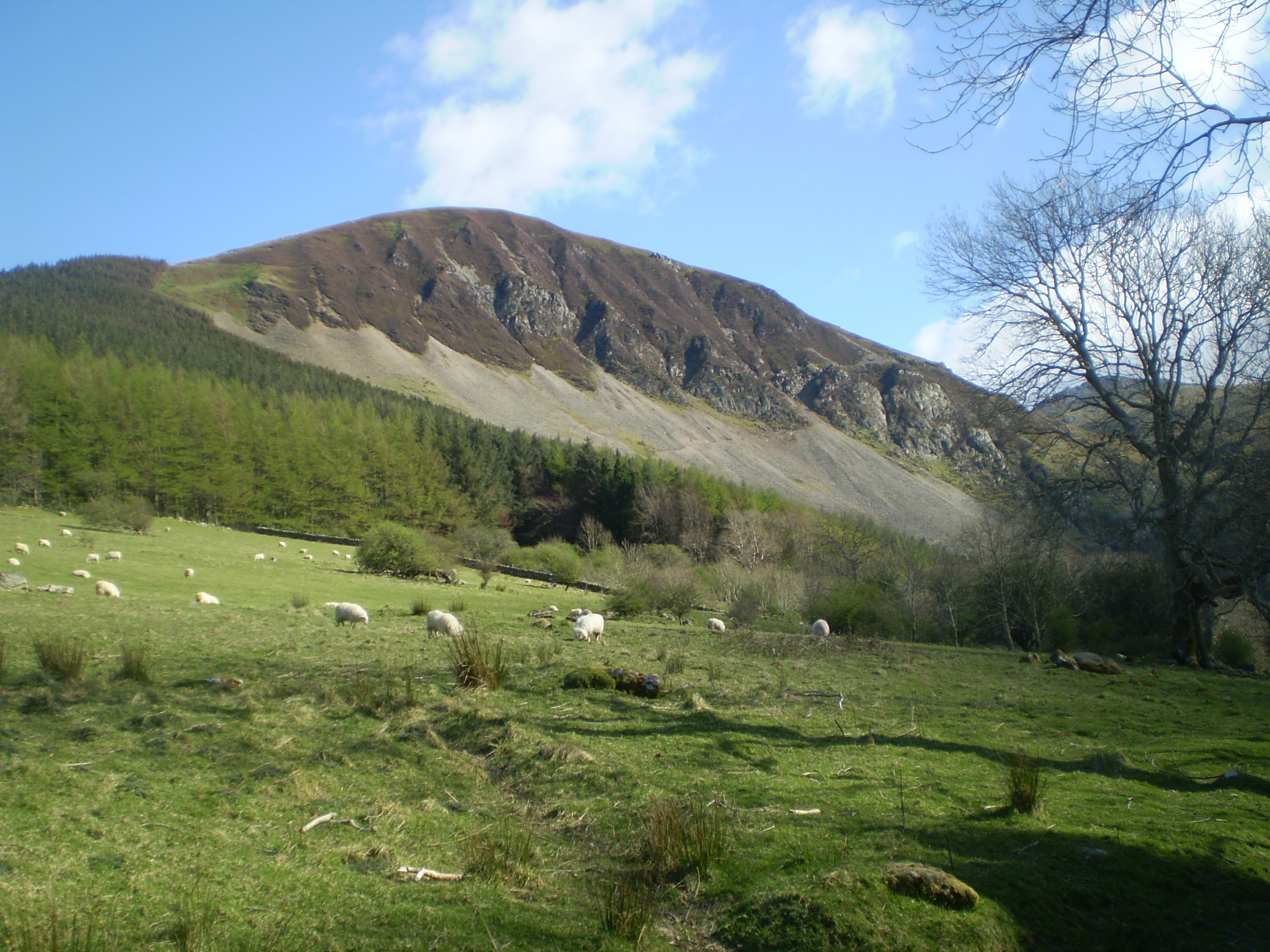
Llwytmor Bach from near Aber Falls

Llwytmor is a satellite peak of Foel-fras, and forms a part of the Carneddau range. The summit is 849 metres (2,785 ft) above sea level and it contains a series of boulderfields, a shelter and several cairns. It is the 27th highest peak in Wales. In editions of OS Maps published into the 1960’s it was called Llwydmor (Llwyd is the Welsh word for grey) and it is likely that the later substitution of ‘t’ for ‘d’ is a typographical error.

On a fine day to the north, the summit offers extensive views towards the Menai Strait, Anglesey and on exceptionally clear days the Isle of Man across the Irish Sea can be seen. The Lake District in England and the Wicklow Mountains in Ireland are also visible on clear days. Carneddau mountain ponies graze on the mountain throughout the year. Its full name Llwytmor Uchaf means "upper big (derived from the Welsh word “mawr”) (&) grey".

It has a subsidiary summit, Llwytmor Bach (690 metres, 2264 feet), to the North West of Llwytmor summit itself, offers sweeping views into the Cwm Coch, Aber Falls and Afon Anafon valleys below. The summit of Llwytmor Bach also contains a small enclosed refuge shelter, which provides much more protection from poor weather than a standard summit shelter.
