= Gyrn Wigau =

Coordinates: 53.18295°N 3.96630°W

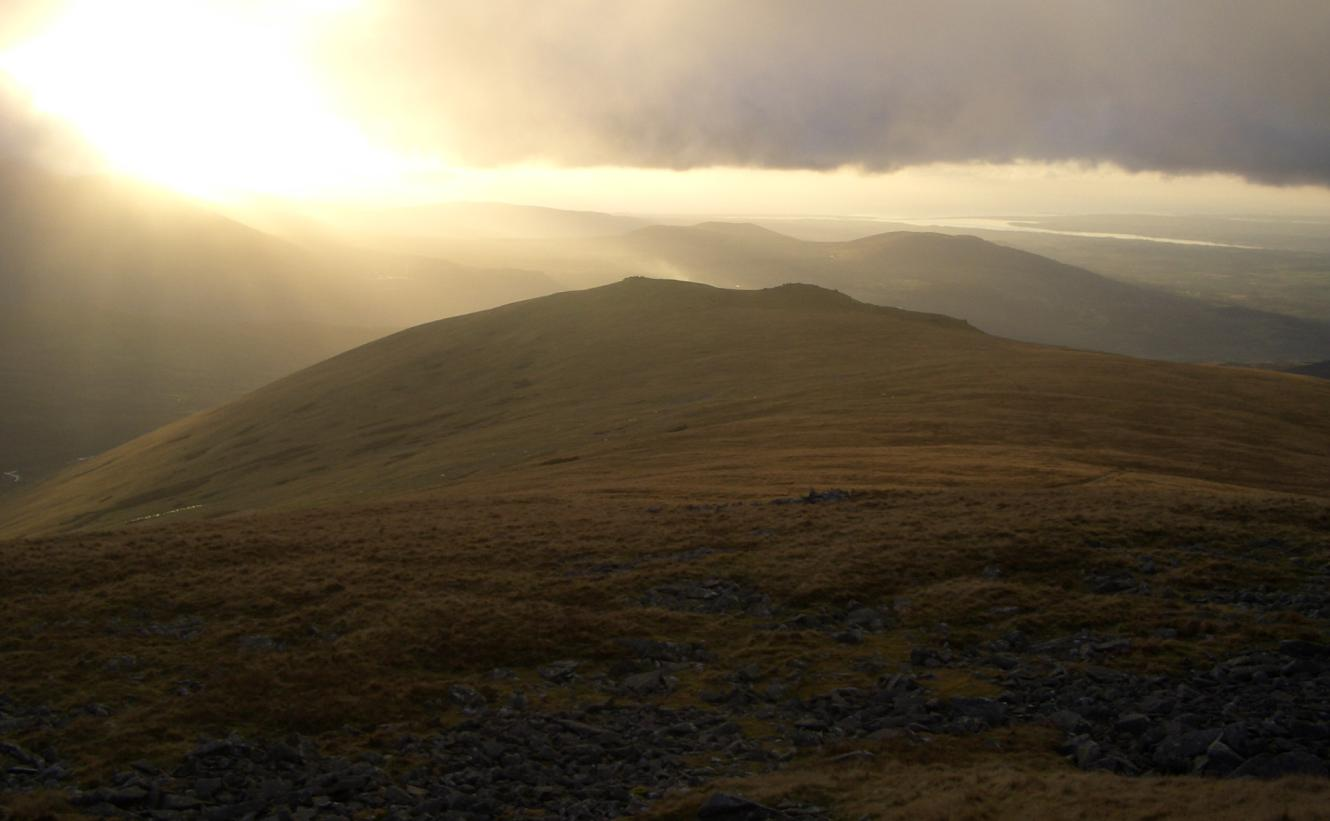
- Gyrn Wigau from Drosgl

Highest point
- Elevation: 643 m (2,110 ft)
- Prominence: 15 m (49 ft)
- Listing: Nuttall

Geography
- Location: Snowdonia, Wales

Gyrn Wigau is a summit of the Carneddau range in Snowdonia, Wales, and forms a part of the western Carneddau commonly known as the Beras. It is a top of Drosgl. It has only 15 metres of topographical prominence but is listed as a Nuttall.
