= Carnedd Dafydd =

Mountain in Snowdonia, Wales

Coordinates: 53.14729°N 4.00205°W

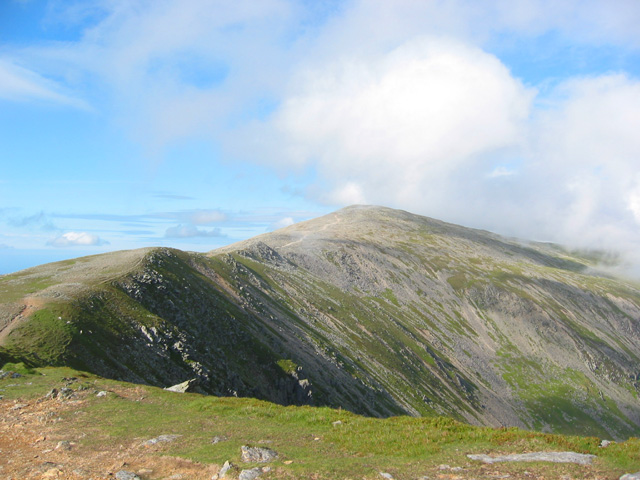
- Carnedd Dafydd from the ridge towards Pen yr Ole Wen

Highest point
- Elevation: 1,044 m (3,425 ft)
- Prominence: 114 m (374 ft)
- Parent peak: Carnedd Llewelyn
- Listing: Hewitt, Welsh 3000s, Nuttall, Furth

Naming
- English translation: David's cairn
- Language of name: Welsh
- Pronunciation: Welsh: [ˈkarnɛð ˈdavɨð]

Geography
- Location: Gwynedd / Conwy, Wales
- Parent range: Snowdonia
- OS grid: SH662630

Listed summits of Carnedd Dafydd
Name	Grid ref	Height	Status
Foel Meirch		800 m (2,600 ft)	Nuttall

Carnedd Dafydd is a mountain peak in the Carneddau range in Snowdonia, Wales, and is the fourth highest peak in Wales. Situated south-west of Carnedd Llewelyn and north of Pen yr Ole Wen, Carnedd Dafydd is on the main ridge of the Carneddau, and on the border between Gwynedd and Conwy. The average annual temperature of the mountain is around 3–4 °C (37–39 °F).

Carnedd Dafydd rises to height of 1,044 m (according to OS maps detail) and is usually climbed by first ascending Pen yr Ole Wen and then following the ridge along to Carnedd Dafydd, though it is also possible to make a direct ascent from Tal y Llyn Ogwen, first following the stream, Afon Lloer, to the mountain lake of Ffynnon Lloer then climbing up the slope to the summit.

Like most of the summits in the southern Carneddau, it has a flat, boulder-strewn summit plateau. Immediately to the north lie the crags of Ysgolion Duon, well known to climbers.

The origin of its name, which translates as Dafydd's (or David's) cairn, like that of its neighbouring peak, Carnedd Llewelyn (Llywelyn's cairn), are named after Llywelyn ap Gruffudd, the last independent prince of Wales, and his younger brother, Dafydd ap Gruffudd. The nearby peak Carnedd Lladron, commonly known as Carnedd Uchaf, has now been renamed by O.S. Carnedd Gwenllian in memory of Llywelyn's daughter Lady Gwenllian. Dafydd was captured at Nanhysglain, near Bera Mawr, on 21 June 1283; taken to Shrewsbury, he was hanged, drawn and quartered.
