= Foel Grach =

Mountain in Snowdonia, Wales

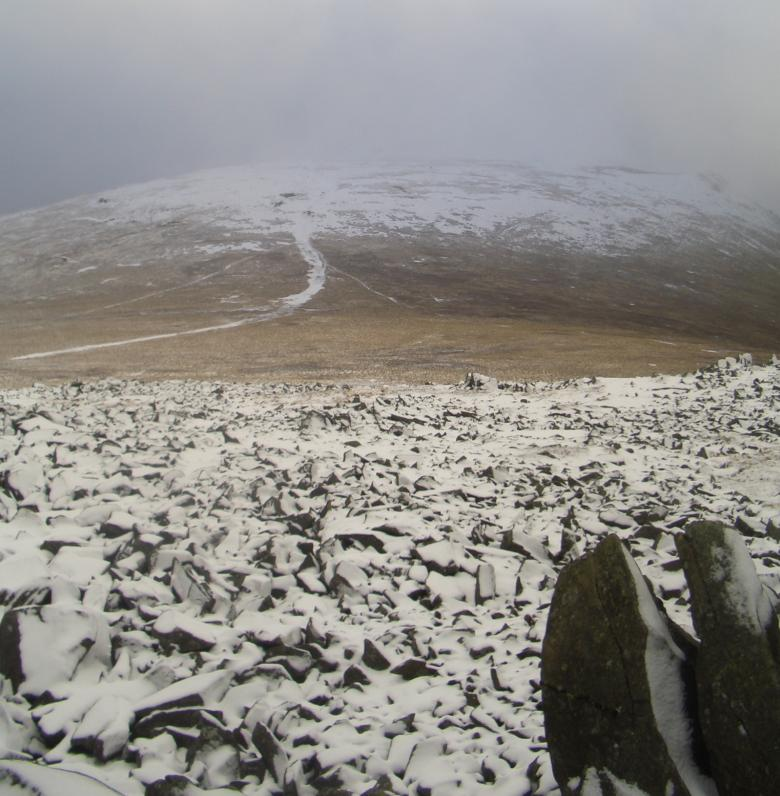
- Foel Grach from Garnedd Uchaf in November 2008.

Highest point
- Elevation: 975 m (3,199 ft)
- Prominence: 42 m (138 ft)
- Parent peak: Carnedd Llewelyn
- Listing: Hewitt, Welsh 3000s, Nuttall, Furth
- Coordinates: 53°10′27″N 3°57′48″W

Naming
- English translation: scabby hill
- Language of name: Welsh
- Pronunciation: Welsh: [ˈvɔi̯l ˈɡraːχ/]

Geography
- Location: Conwy / Gwynedd, Wales
- Parent range: Snowdonia
- OS grid: SH689659
- Topo map: OS Landranger 115

Listed summits of Foel Grach
Name	Grid ref	Height	Status
Craig Eigiau		735 metres (2,411 ft)	sub Hewitt, Nuttall

Foel Grach is a mountain in the Carneddau range. It is the eighth-highest summit in Snowdonia as well as Wales, and is included in the Welsh 3000s.

It is located on a broad ridge extending northwards from Carnedd Llewelyn to Carnedd Gwenllian (formerly Y Garnedd Uchaf) and Foel-fras. An emergency refuge has been built below the summit. Compared to the surrounding mountains, much deeper snow settles here due to its rather broad summit and high grassy slopes. On clear days the Isle of Man and even the Mourne Mountains in Northern Ireland can be seen from the summit.
