= Carneddau =

Mountain group in north Wales

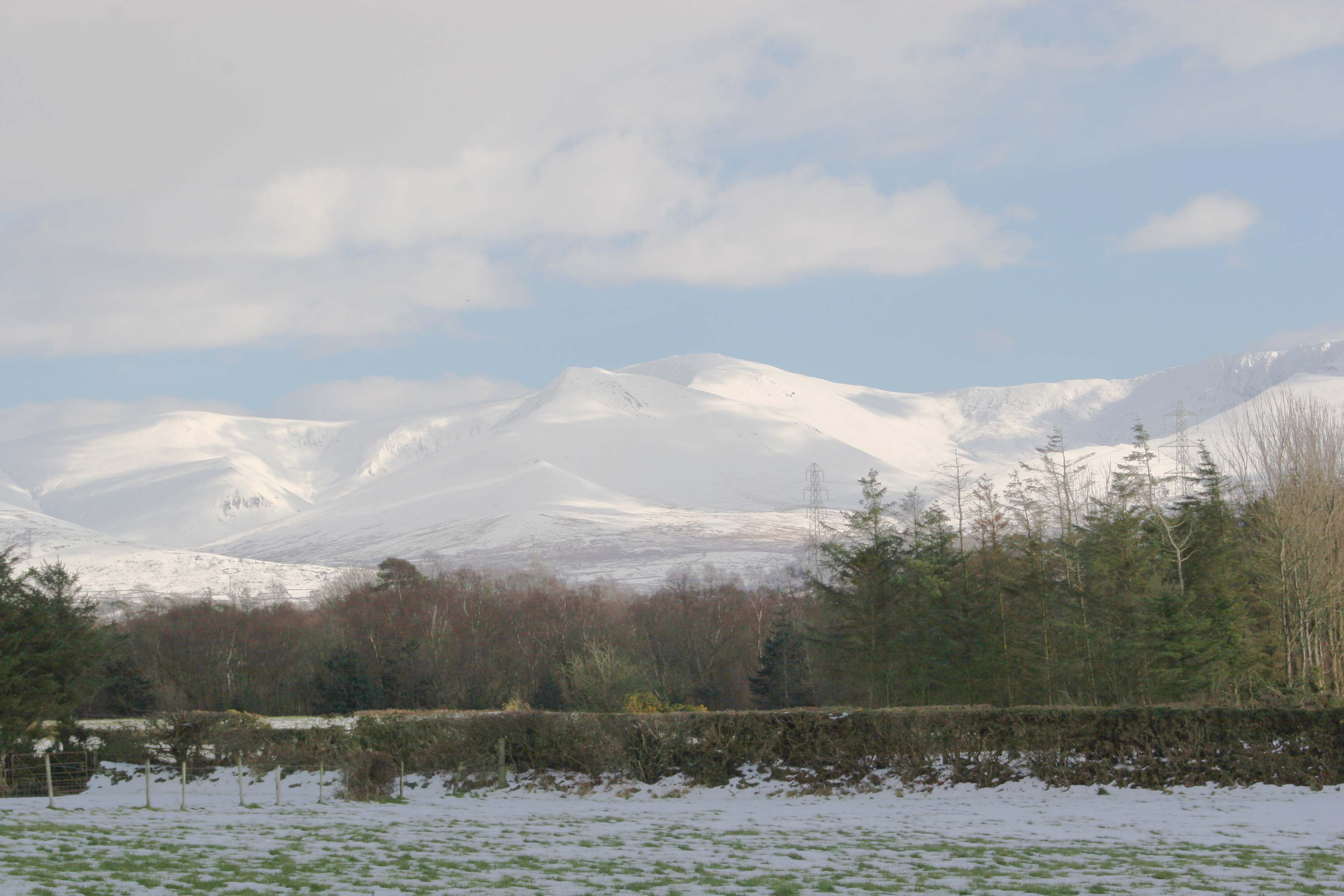
The snow-covered Carneddau with Yr Elen in the centre, Carnedd Llywelyn behind and Carnedd Dafydd to the right

The Carneddau (lit. 'the cairns'; Carneddau is a Welsh plural form, and is sometimes anglicised to Carnedds) are a group of mountains in Snowdonia, Wales. They include the largest contiguous areas of high ground (over 2,500 feet (760 m) or 3,000 feet (910 m) high) in Wales and England (although larger areas over 2,000 feet (610 m) are found in Northern England), as well as six or seven of the highest peaks in the country—the Fifteen Peaks. The range also encloses a number of lakes such as Llyn Cowlyd and Llyn Eigiau, and the Aber Falls waterfall. It is delimited by the Irish Sea to the north, the Conwy valley to the east, and by the A5 road from Betws-y-Coed to Bethesda to the south and west. The area covers nearly 200 square kilometres (80 sq mi), about 10% of the area of Snowdonia. The area is bordered by three main roads—the A55 (to the north), the A5 to the south and the A470 to the east.

== Geology ==
In common with much of Snowdonia, the rocks forming the Carneddau originated largely during the Ordovician period between 485 and 444 Ma (million years ago). Principal among these are the mudstones and sandstones of the Arenig (478-470 Ma) to Caradoc age (459-449 Ma) Nant Ffrancon Subgroup and the tuffs etc. of the Caradoc age Llewelyn Volcanic Group. These are overlain by the sandstones, siltstones, tuffs and tuffites of the Cwm Eigiau Formation. Within the Nant Ffrancon sequence are a variety of igneous intrusions and the lavas and tuffs of the Foel Fras Volcanic Complex. The complex geology results from the plate tectonic processes taking place during the Caledonian orogeny involving continental landmasses on either side of the Iapetus Ocean moving together and colliding over a protracted period. Over time, these mountains have been eroded by the weather and scoured by advancing and retreating ice sheets. The Carneddau were formed in this way and consist of volcanic and sedimentary rock. The last ice sheet retreated about 10,000 years ago. It left behind a landscape of smooth summits above erratic boulders and scree at the foot of cliffs on the eastern side of the mountains, and moraines that created shallow lakes in the cwms.

== History ==
This area was first colonised in Neolithic times, when Stone Age farmers started clearing the native forests of oak and birch that covered all but the uppermost ridges and summits. They were followed by Bronze Age people who cleared more forests and erected standing stones across the uplands. There are more than one thousand ancient monuments on the Carneddau estate (the land owned by the National Trust, which covers the Carneddau and the Glyderau ranges). The remains of circular stone huts dating back to this time have been found and the cairns on the mountain summits contain cremated human remains, presumably from prominent people of this time.

On the north western slopes of Drosgl there are clusters of Iron Age huts and three cairns were built on the top of Moel Faban. This settlement endured for a thousand years, lasting until after the Romans arrived. There are other huts elsewhere and traces of field systems and numerous hill forts situated at strategic upland sites. The Romans subdued the area and built a road, Bwlch y Ddeufaen across the northern slopes of the Carneddau. After they left in 410, the land was controlled once again by Welsh princes who schemed and formed alliances among themselves. The clearance of the native forests continued and at one time goats were the main form of livestock. Their feral descendants are still found in the area today on the Glyderau. They were later followed by cattle and it was not till the 18th century desire for wool that sheep became numerous. By the thirteenth century, English ambitions were increasing under King Edward I of England in this part of Wales and the English castles encircled Snowdonia.

The two highest mountains in the range are named Carnedd Llewellyn and Carnedd Dafydd after the thirteenth-century Prince of Wales, Llywelyn ap Iorwerth or Llywelyn the Great (1172–1240), and his grandson Prince Dafydd ap Gruffudd (1238–1283). It was in a bog in the northern foothills of Bera Mawr, at a place called Nanhysglain, that Prince Dafydd ap Gruffudd and his family were captured in June 1283. In October, Dafydd was executed at Shrewsbury by Edward I and this ended the seven-hundred-year rule of Gwynedd by the family descended from Cunedda Wledig and the end of independence for Wales.

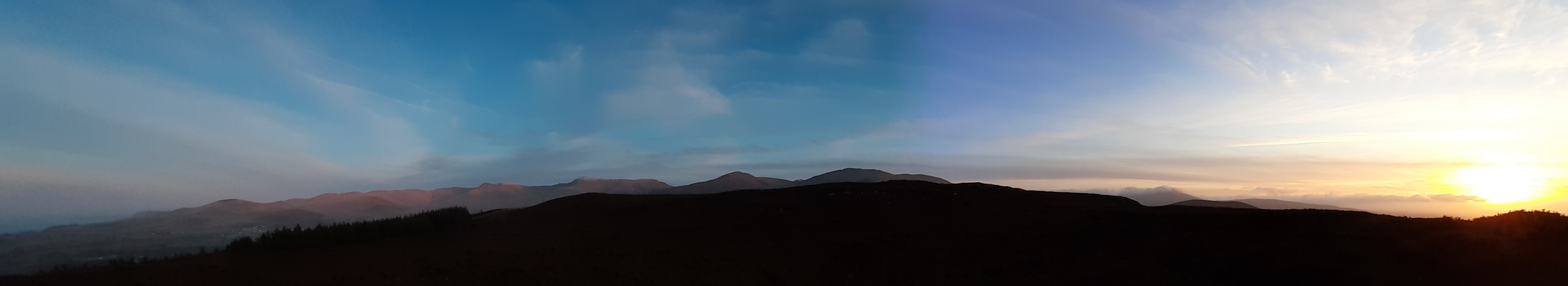
Carneddau mountain range panorama, seen from the top of Moel-y-Ci

== Legend ==
Llyn Ogwen was reputed to be the place from which Sir Bedivere failed to draw King Arthur's sword Excalibur. Another legend has it that the two small lakes below the towering cliffs to the east of Carnedd Llywelyn were haunted and that deformed fish with heads but no bodies lurked in their depths. A more recent legend records that the two great boulders known as the "Meini Gwynedd" near the summit of Carnedd Llywelyn were lifted there bodily in 1542 from the banks of one of these lakes. Henry VIII is said to have ordered the investigation of this claim and later proclaimed that it was true.

== Geography ==
The Carneddau are the largest continuous stretch of mountain land over 2,500 feet in the country. They are not as rugged as the Snowdon massif or the Glyderau but are impressive nevertheless. Much of the higher ground is covered with rough grass and heather, with patches of shattered rocks. Pen-yr-Ole-Wen lies on the western edge of the range and dominates the Nant Ffrancon pass. To the northeast along the main Carneddau ridge is Carnedd Dafydd, then Carnedd Llewellyn and beyond are other lower summits. To the north and west of the ridge are mostly grassy slopes, while to the east there are some high cliffs, deep valleys and small lakes. The Carneddau range is home to the only population of wild horses in the United Kingdom.

The peaks in the central Carnedd ridge are:

- Pen yr Ole Wen (978 metres, 3,209 ft)
- Carnedd Dafydd (1,044 metres, 3,425 ft)
- Carnedd Llewelyn (1,064 metres, 3,491 ft)
- Yr Elen (962 metres, 3,156 ft)
- Foel Grach (976 metres, 3,202 ft)
- Carnedd Gwenllian (926 metres, 3,038 ft)
- Foel-fras (942 metres, 3,091 ft)

In September 2009 the peak referred to as Carnedd Uchaf was renamed Carnedd Gwenllian following a campaign by the Gwenllian Society to honour Princess Gwenllian, the daughter of Llywelyn ap Gruffudd, Prince of Wales.

== Flora and fauna ==
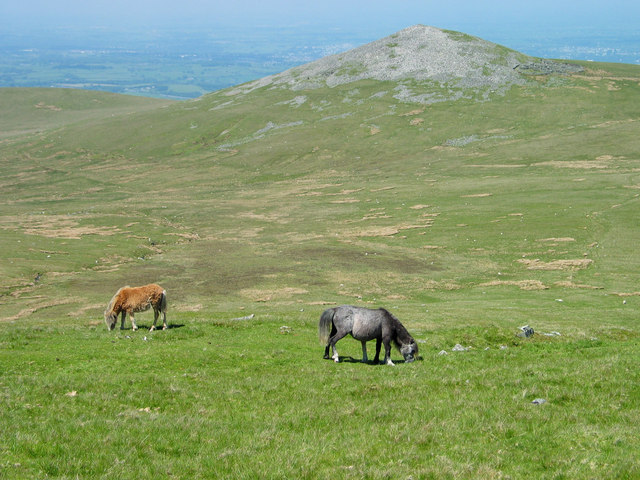
Wild ponies on the flanks of Drosgl

The plants growing on the Carneddau need to be extremely hardy to withstand the snow, frosts, and gales they will encounter during the year and those found by sheltered streams in the valleys are very different from those clinging to crevices on windswept rocks. Sheep graze the mountains and impact the composition of the sward, nibbling out the most succulent young growth. Where the sheep are fenced out globe flowers, wood avens, angelica, red campion and roseroot can be found at lower elevations, along with ash, alder, hawthorn, holly and rowan. Higher up on scree there are Welsh poppies and in damp crevices under rocks the rare Wilson's filmy fern. Boggy areas support cotton grass, marsh orchid, sundew and bog asphodel. The better-drained rocky slopes have bilberry, ling, bell heather and cross-leaved heath and the summit ridge has prostrate dwarf willows, sedges, mosses and lichens.

Until five hundred years ago, wolves and deer would have roamed the Carneddau. They have long gone, and, besides the ubiquitous sheep, there are now red foxes, moles, mice, a few pine martens (probably extinct), polecats, and an increasing number of otters. Birds breeding here include common buzzard, kestrel, merlin and peregrine, raven and chough. The rare ring ouzel, the wheatear and the stonechat are all at home here, as are the skylark and the meadow pipit. Common sandpipers nest beside the lakes, the rare twite inhabits the Nant Ffrancon Valley and dotterels are found passing through the upper slopes.

Wild ponies roam the Carneddau, and a study of their DNA in 2012 revealed that they have been isolated as a breed for at least several hundred years. Numbers were severely reduced by the heavy snows of spring 2013.

== List of summits ==
Pen yr Ole Wen rising above Ogwen Cottage

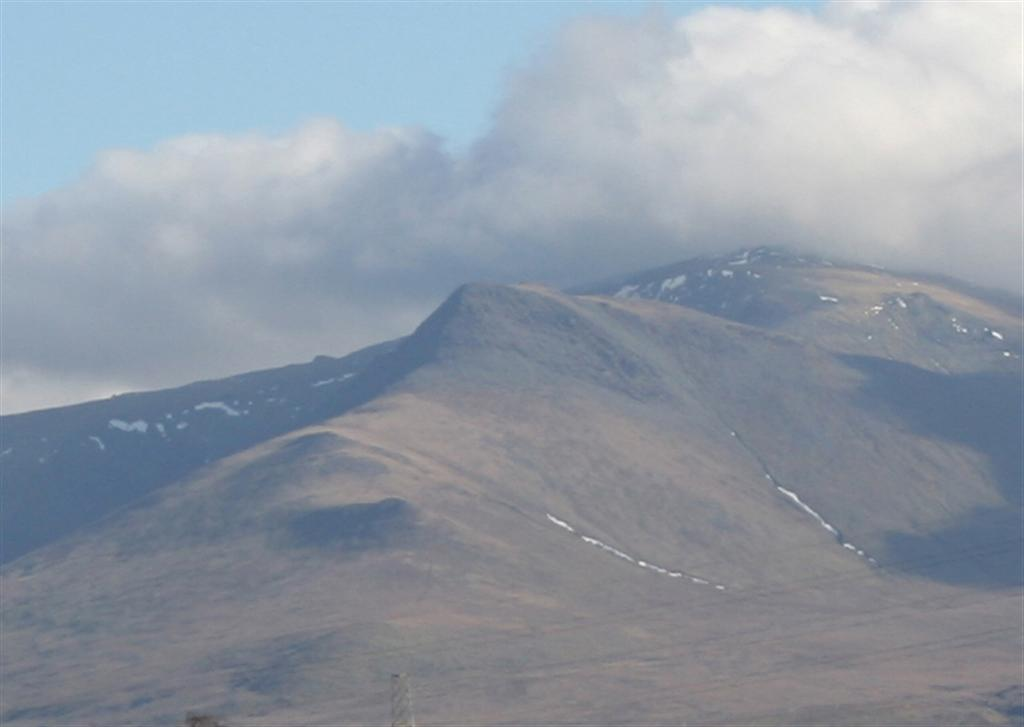
Yr Elen, with Carnedd Llewelyn behind

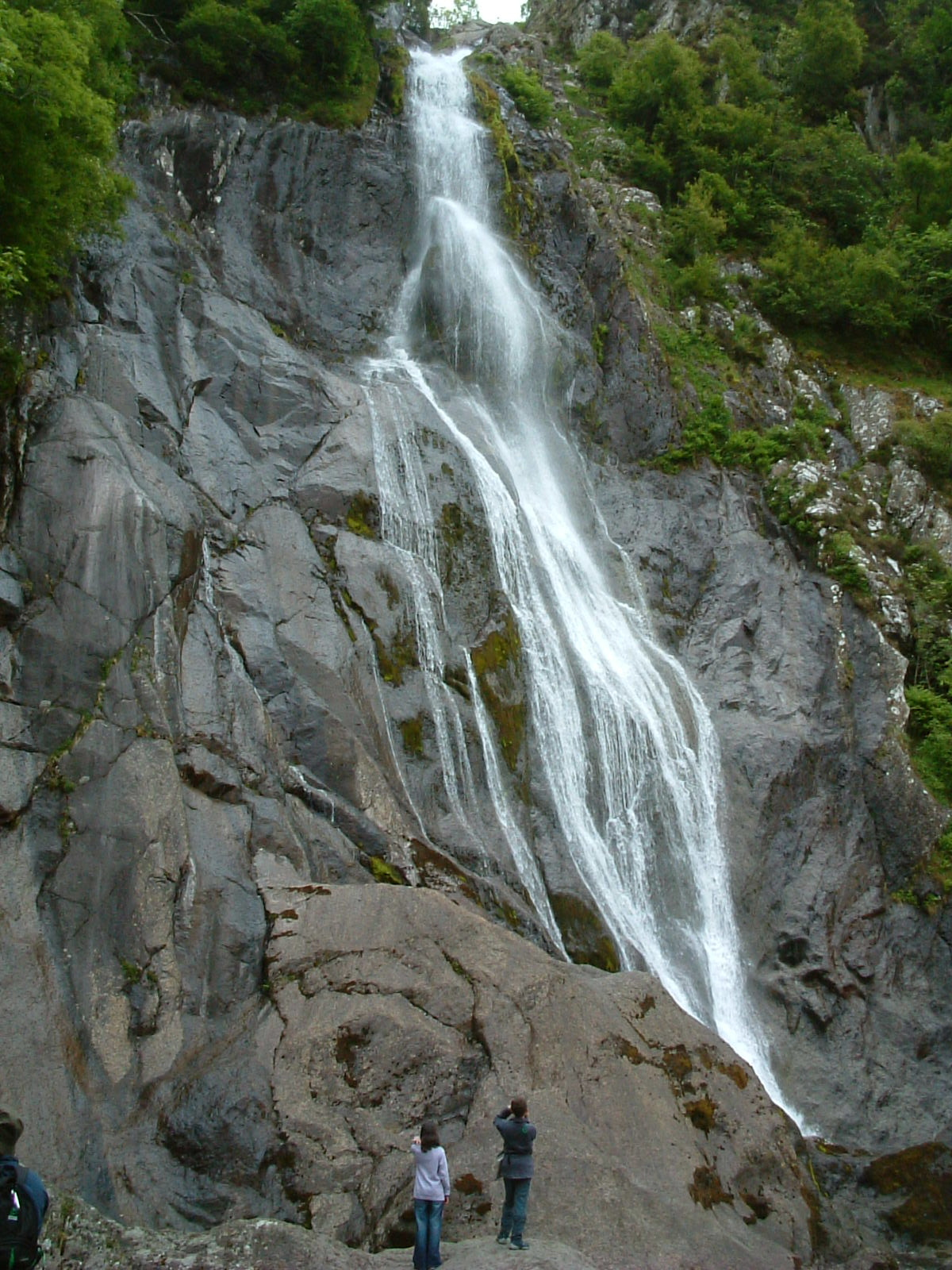
Aber Falls, at the foot of the Carneddau

Peak	Elevation	Grid reference	Status
Carnedd Llewelyn	1064	SH683644	Nuttall, Hewitt, Marilyn
Pen Llithrig y Wrach	799	SH716623	Nuttall, Hewitt, Marilyn
Creigiau Gleision	678	SH729615	Nuttall, Hewitt, Marilyn
Tal y Fan	610	SH729726	Nuttall, Hewitt, Marilyn
Carnedd Dafydd	1044	SH663630	Nuttall, Hewitt
Pen yr Ole Wen	978	SH655619	Nuttall, Hewitt
Foel Grach	976	SH688658	Nuttall, Hewitt
Yr Elen	962	SH673650	Nuttall, Hewitt
Foel-fras	942	SH696681	Nuttall, Hewitt
Llwytmor	849	SH689692	Nuttall, Hewitt
Pen yr Helgi Du	833	SH698630	Nuttall, Hewitt
Bera Mawr	794	SH674682	Nuttall, Hewitt
Drum	770	SH708695	Nuttall, Hewitt
Drosgl	758	SH664679	Nuttall, Hewitt
Carnedd Gwenllian (Carnedd Uchaf)	926	SH687669	Nuttall, Hewitt
Creigiau Gleision North Top	634	SH730608	Nuttall, Hewitt
Bera Bach	807	SH672677	Nuttall
Foel Meirch	795	SH656637	Nuttall
Craig Eigiau	735	SH713654	Nuttall
Carnedd y Ddelw	688	SH707705	
Gyrn Wigau	643	SH730608	Nuttall
Craiglwyn	623	SH730608	Nuttall
Pen y Castell	623	SH721688	Nuttall
Foel Lwyd	603	SH720723	
Moel Wnion	580	SH649697	
Moel Eilio	546	SH747659	
Craig Wen	543	SH729602	
Foel Lûs	362	SH732761	
Grinllwm	287	SH776624	
Alltwen	255	SH745772	
Penmaenbach	245	SH748780	
Mynydd y Dref / Conwy Mountain	244	SH759778	

== See also ==
- Carneddau ponies
