= Pen yr Helgi Du =

Mountain in Conwy County Borough, Wales

Coordinates: 53.14818°N 3.94826°W

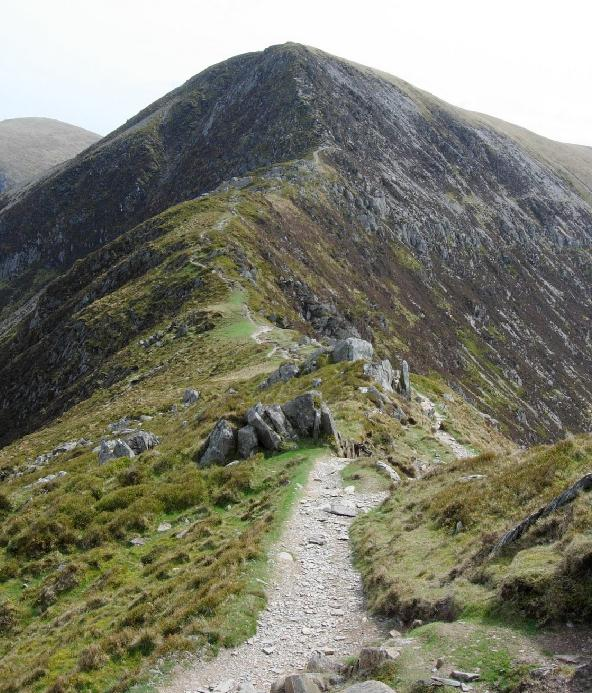
- Pen yr Helgi Du from the Craig yr Ysfa ridge

Highest point
- Elevation: 833 m (2,733 ft)
- Prominence: 85 m (279 ft)
- Listing: Hewitt, Nuttall

Naming
- English translation: peak of the black hunting-dog
- Language of name: Welsh
- Pronunciation: Welsh: [ˈpɛn ɐr ˈhɛlɡi ˈdɨ]

Geography
- Location: Conwy, Wales
- Parent range: Snowdonia
- OS grid: SH698630
- Topo map: OS Landranger 115

Pen yr Helgi Du (Welsh for 'head or hill of the black hound') is a mountain peak in the eastern part of the Carneddau in Snowdonia, North Wales.

It lies on the south-eastern flanks of Carnedd Llewelyn, and is linked to Carnedd Llewelyn over the col of Bwlch Eryl Farchog, a knife-edge ridge over the cliffs of Craig Yr Ysfa. Cwm Eigiau lies to the east and the Ffynnon Llugwy reservoir to the south. To the east of Pen yr Helgi Du is Pen Llithrig y Wrach (the slippery peak of the witch).
