= Yr Elen =

Mountain in Wales

Coordinates: 53.16643°N 3.98649°W

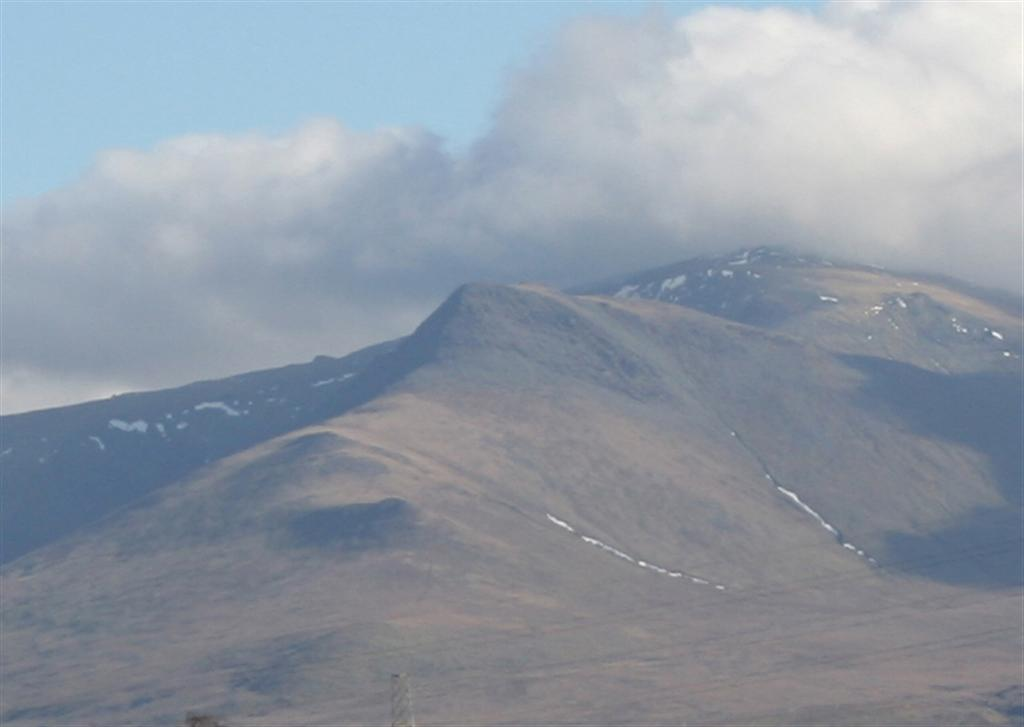

Highest point
- Elevation: 962 m (3,156 ft)
- Prominence: 57 m (187 ft)
- Parent peak: Carnedd Llewelyn
- Listing: Hewitt, Welsh 3000s, Nuttall, Furth

Naming
- English translation: Eleanor or the leech
- Language of name: Welsh
- Pronunciation: Welsh: [ər ˈɛlɛn]

Geography
- Location: Gwynedd, Wales
- Parent range: Snowdonia
- OS grid: SH673651
- Topo map: OS Landranger 115

Yr Elen is a mountain in the Carneddau range in Snowdonia, Wales. It is the ninth-highest mountain in Snowdonia. The average annual temperature of the peak is around 4 °C (39 °F). It lies on a short ridge running north-northwest off the main northeast-to-southwest ridge of the Carneddau, just over one kilometre from Carnedd Llewelyn.

It is usually climbed from the main ridge of the Carneddau, as it is only a short walk from Carnedd Llywelyn. It can also be climbed from Gerlan, near Bethesda, following Afon Llafar, then heading up the slopes of Yr Elen, but this involves walking through wet valleys and several difficult rivers to cross. In drier times, ascent can be made via the crossing of Afon Caseg and then up the "front edge" of the peak. From here, views are north-west over to Bangor and Anglesey on a clear day.

The etymology of the name is unclear, with the personal name "Helen" or "Eleanor" being one possibility, perhaps after Eleanor de Montfort (d. 1282), Princess of Wales and wife of Llywelyn ap Gruffudd. Another is the leech (from soft mutation of Welsh gelen, leech), perhaps about how Yr Elen appears to be attached to the side of the remaining Carneddau.
