= Pen yr Ole Wen =

Mountain in Snowdonia, Wales

Coordinates: 53.13723°N 4.01205°W

- Pen yr Ole Wen seen from near Llyn Ogwen

Highest point
- Elevation: 978 m (3,209 ft)
- Prominence: 45 m (148 ft)
- Parent peak: Carnedd Dafydd
- Listing: Hewitt, Welsh 3000s, Nuttall, Furth

Naming
- English translation: Head of the White Slope
- Language of name: Welsh
- Pronunciation: Welsh: [ˈpɛn ər ˈɔlɛ ˈwɛn]

Geography
- Location: Snowdonia, Wales
- Parent range: Carneddau
- OS grid: SH655619
- Topo map: OS Landranger 115

Pen yr Ole Wen is the seventh highest mountain in Snowdonia and in Wales. It is the most southerly of the Carneddau range.

The mountain lies to the north of Idwal Cottage youth hostel on the A5 road, from where it has a pyramidal appearance. It may be climbed from the hostel by a path that leads directly up the south west "corner", climbing 675 m (2,215 ft) in about 1.5 km (0.9 mi) (i.e. an average gradient of nearly 1 in 2). A slightly easier ascent involves starting from Tal-y-Llyn Ogwen, about a mile north-east from the hostel, following the stream until nearing the outflow from the mountain lake Ffynnon Lloer and then branching left to take the path up the ridge.

For many years the mountain's name was translated as "Head of the White Light", the interpretation of which was a mystery. However, in 2004 Professor Hywel Wyn Owen at the Place-Name Research Centre at Bangor University in Bangor, Gwynedd resolved the matter saying that Ole comes from Goleddf, which means slope or hillside, making the correct English translation: "Head of the White Slope".

Pen yr Ole Wen is often climbed as part of a longer route on the Carneddau range. It is the same height as England's highest peak, Scafell Pike.

The mountain's average temperature hovers around 5 degrees Celsius (41 °F).
