= Aber Falls =

Waterfall in Gwynedd, Wales

- Rhaeadr Fawr (Welsh)
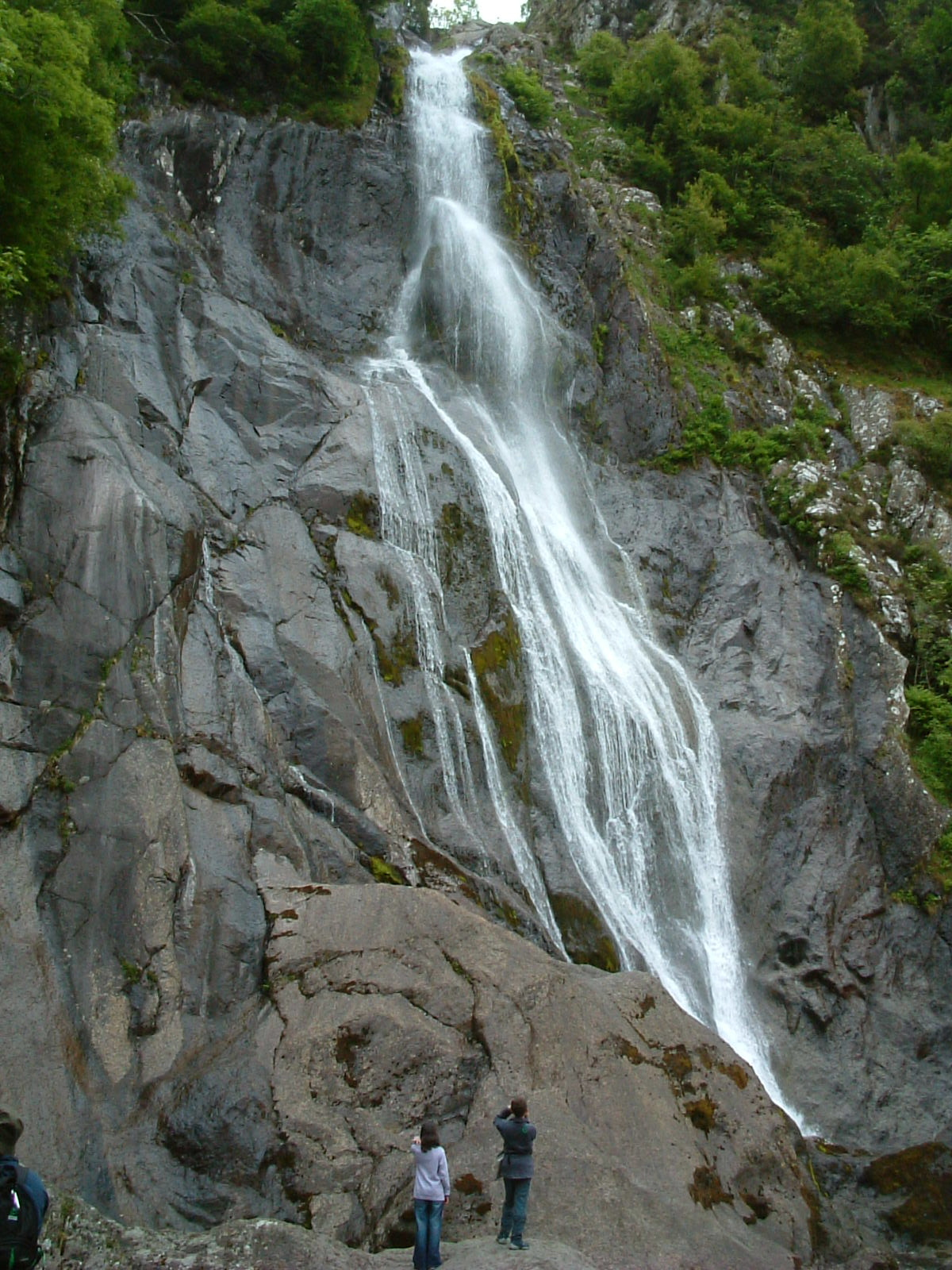
- Aber Falls (size is shown by people stood below)

- Location within Gwynedd
- Location: About two miles (3 km) south of the village of Abergwyngregyn
- OS grid: SH6678970052
- Coordinates: 53.2105389°N 3.9949639°W
- Total height: 120 ft (37 m)
- Watercourse: Afon Goch

Aber Falls (Welsh: Rhaeadr Fawr, lit. 'big waterfall') is a waterfall located about two miles (3 km) south of the village of Abergwyngregyn, Gwynedd, Wales.

The waterfall is formed as the Afon Goch plunges about 120 feet (37 m) over a sill of igneous rock in the foothills of the Carneddau range. Two tributaries merge; the enlarged stream is known as Afon Rhaeadr Fawr; from the road bridge, Bont Newydd ("New Bridge"), the name becomes Afon Aber.

There is a second waterfall a short distance west named Rhaeadr-bach or Rhaeadr Fach.

== History ==
Visitors walking along the main footpath towards the falls may spot several small Bronze Age settlements including an excavated roundhouse and smithy fenced off with an information plaque adorning it, several standing stones and cairns are also present, most of these sites can be found on the right side of the pathway. There is also a piece of recording equipment that is recording the weather. It is located to the north west of Snowdonia National Park in Wales.

The waterfall and nearby area has been a popular tourist destination since the Romantic Period, with visitors including author Julius Rodenberg exploring the area.

== Visitor facilities ==
The Falls are accessible by foot on a clearly marked trackway. Car parking, toilets and picnic benches are available. An information centre is at Abergwyngregyn village.

It is possible to bathe in the plunge pool of the falls, although the water is cold even at the height of summer and care must be taken on the often slippery rocks.

== North Wales Path ==
The North Wales Path, a long-distance coastal path between Prestatyn and Bangor, crosses the bridge at the foot of the falls. This bridge, together with the smaller one at the foot of Rhaeadr-bach to the west was erected in 1995.

== See also ==
- List of waterfalls
- List of waterfalls in Wales

== Gallery ==
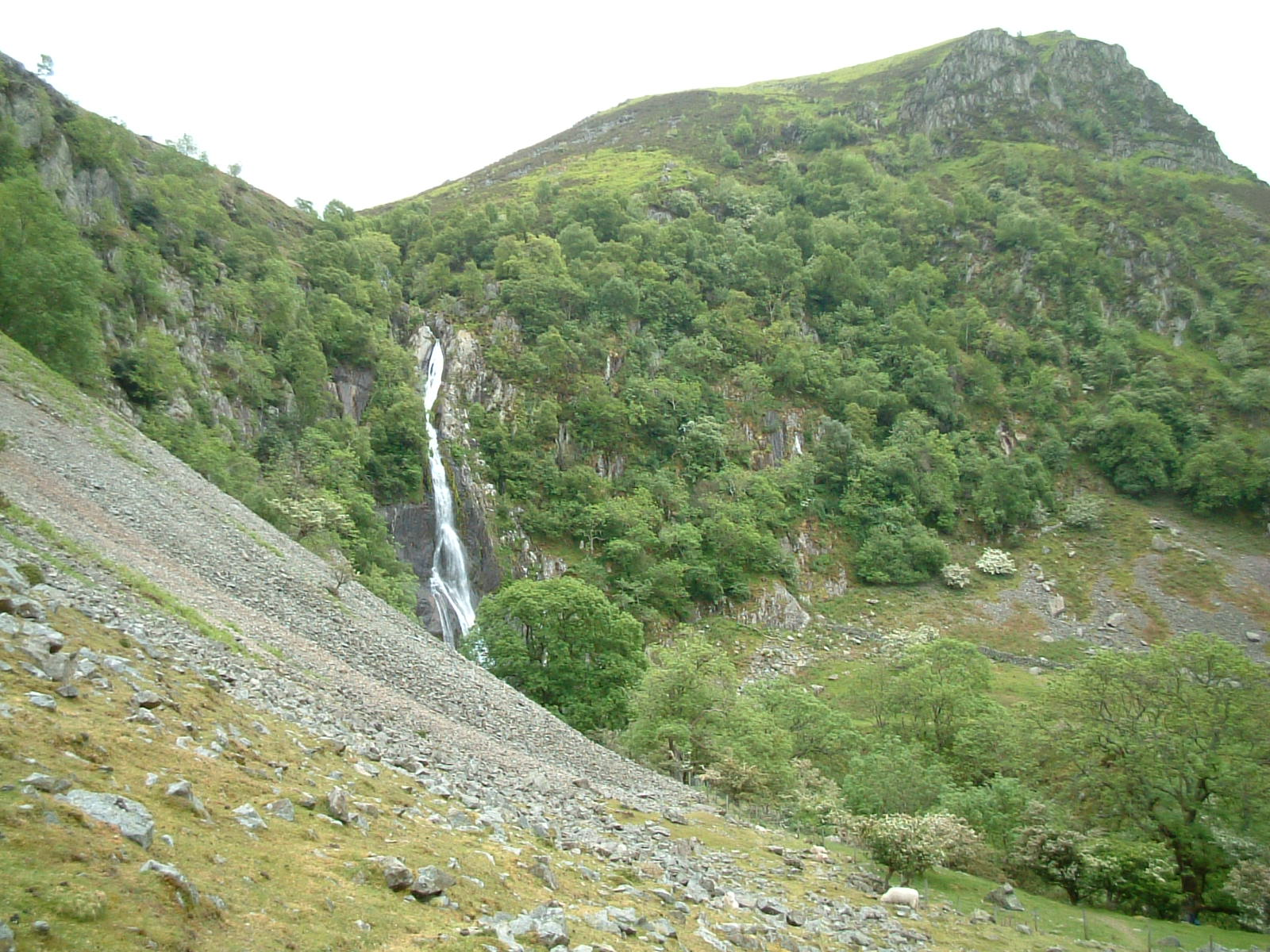
Aber Falls with the mountains around

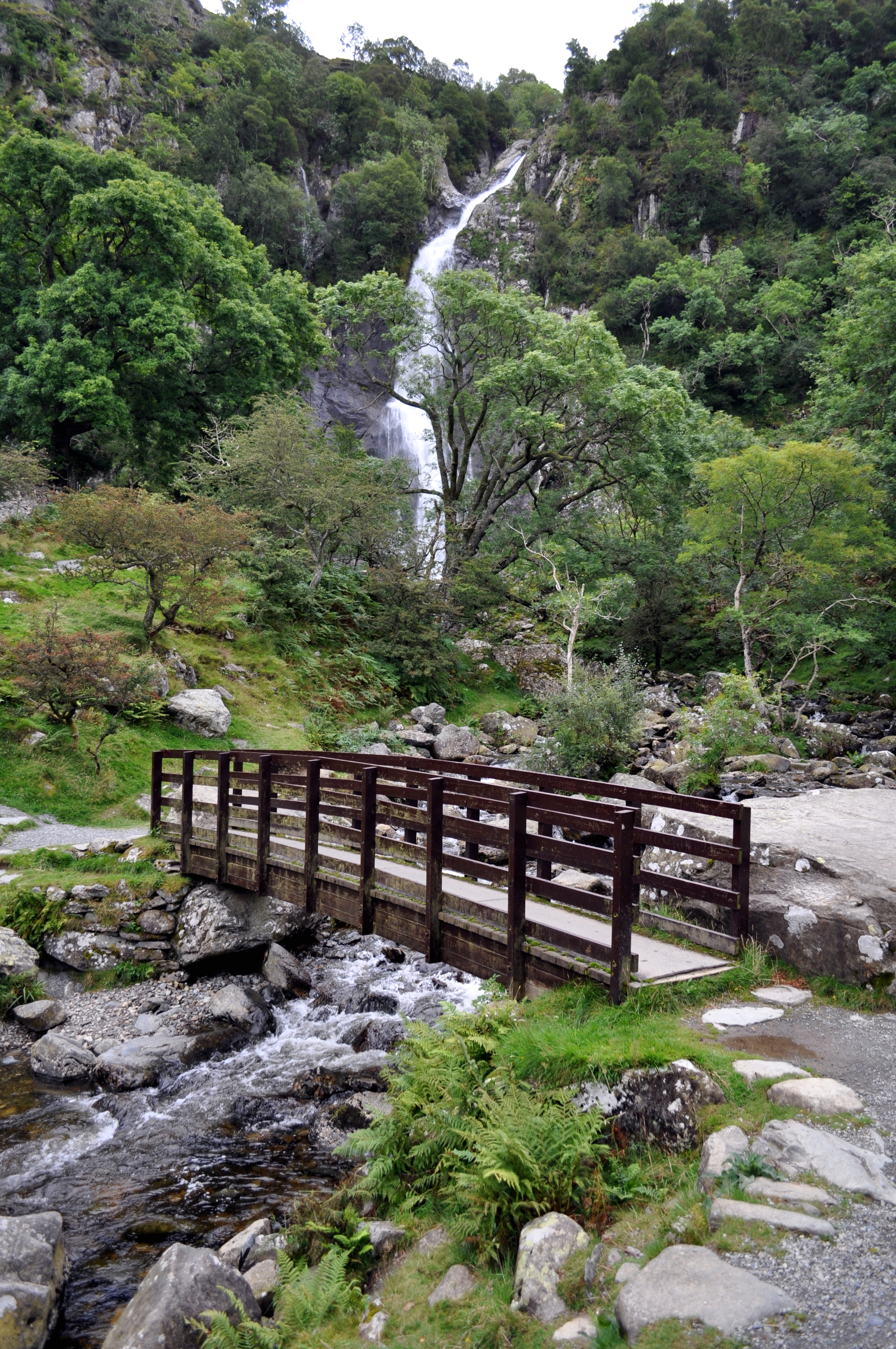
The bridge and falls
