= Foel-fras =

Mountain in North Wales

Coordinates: 53.19395°N 3.95333°W

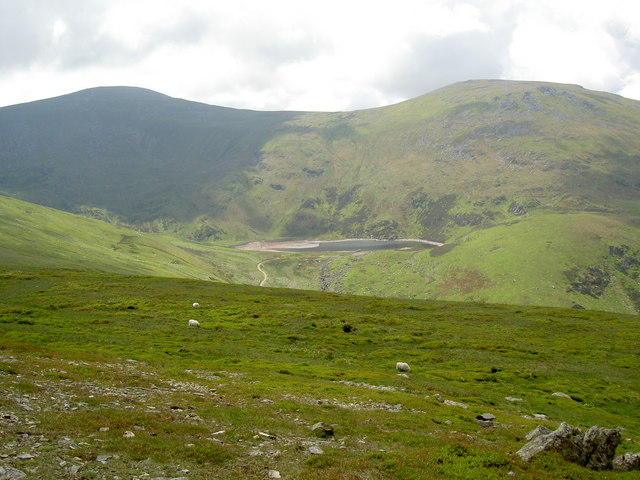
- Foel-fras (Left) and Llwytmor (Right) from the Drum ridge.

Highest point
- Elevation: 944 m (3,097 ft)
- Prominence: 63 m (207 ft)
- Parent peak: Carnedd Llewelyn
- Listing: Hewitt, Welsh 3000s, Nuttall, Furth

Naming
- English translation: broad hill
- Language of name: Welsh
- Pronunciation: Welsh: [ˈvɔi̯l ˈvraːs]

Geography
- Location: Snowdonia, Wales
- OS grid: SH696681
- Topo map: OS Landranger 115

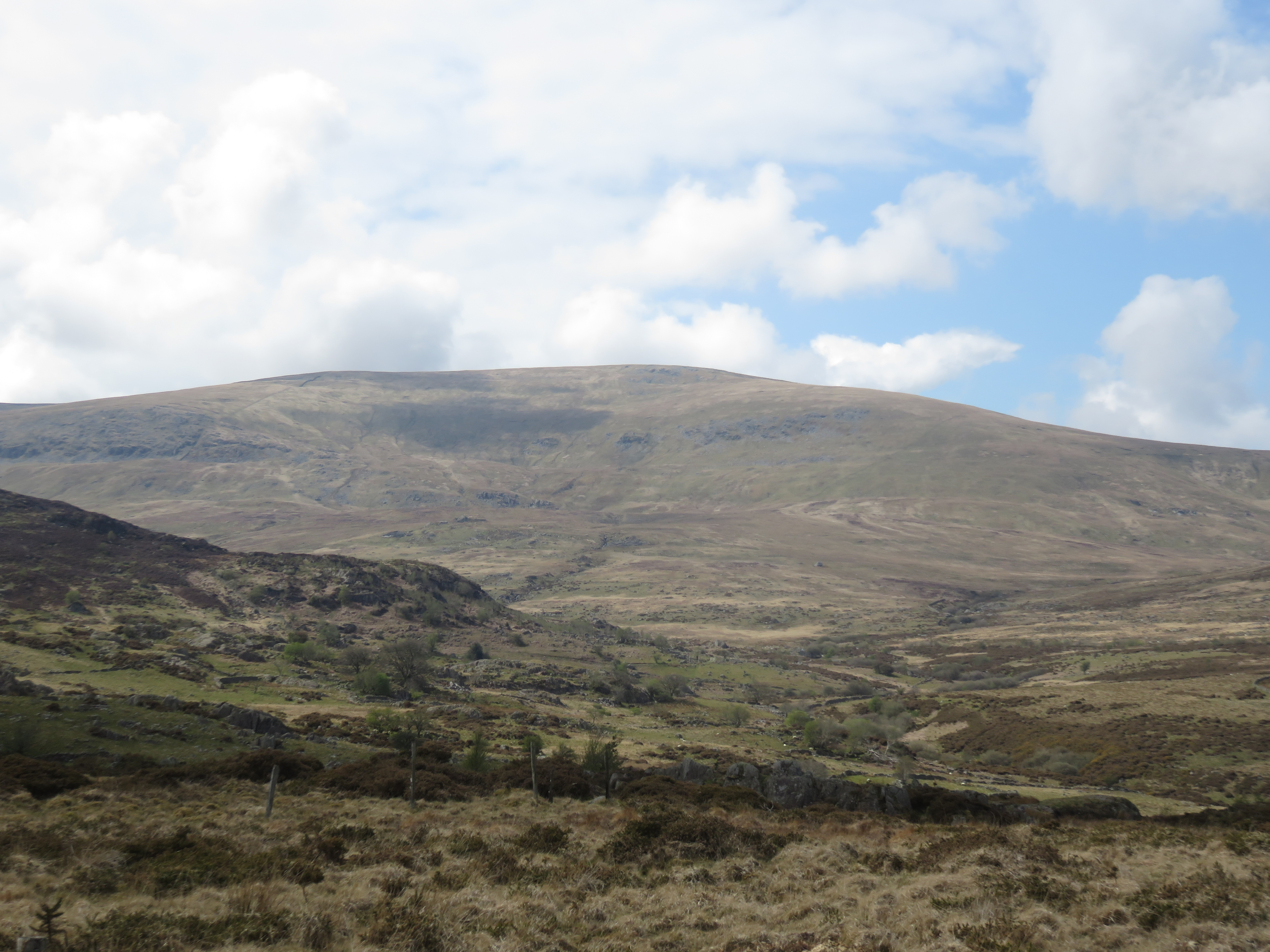
Foel-fras from Cwm Eigiau

Foel-fras (944 m / 3,097 ft) is a mountain in the Carneddau range, about 10 km east of Bethesda in North Wales. It lies on the border between the counties of Gwynedd and Conwy. With a summit elevation of 944 metres (3,097 feet), it is officially the eleventh-highest summit in Wales. Foel-fras is located at the northern end of the main ridge of the Carneddau, between Drum to the north and Foel Grach to the south with the subsidiary summit of Garnedd Uchaf (925 m / 3,034 ft) between it and Foel Grach. Due south and 400 m below lies the reservoir of Llyn Dulyn, while the smaller reservoir of Llyn Anafon lies to the north.

Because of its position, it is the first of the Welsh 3000s reached when doing this walk from the northern end. It can be climbed by driving up the small road signposted "Aber Falls" in the village of Abergwyngregyn, passing the car park for the falls and continuing to a small car park at the end of the road. From there it is possible to take the track bearing left, later turning right to the summit of Drum and continuing along the ridge, or to take the track leading straight on to Llyn Anafon and then climbing up to the ridge between Drum and Foel Fras.

An alternate route up the mountain is to start at the Western end of the Bwlch-y-Ddeufaen pass and take the steep track up the side of Drosgyl, following the fence line all the way to where the ground levels off. Here the views open up and the fence changes direction, running off at almost a right angle to the Southeast (left). From here, follow a small track Southwest until it intersects the larger track previously mentioned - marked by a small quartz-peppered cairn - which will lead you to Drum. From Drum the walk to the summit of Foel Fras is simply parallel to the fence line, which changes into a dry stone wall as you are nearing the summit. Car parking is available at the Eastern end of the pass.

The summit plateau has some ornithological interest in that it is one of the best places in Wales to observe dotterel on their spring and less frequent autumn migration.

Foel Fras can also be reached from Llanfairfechan, an equally beautiful route as that from Aber Falls. Follow the road up through the village of Llanfairfechan until Terrace Walk, take the path from Terrace Walk that takes you past Hengae Farm, then follow the path that can take you to the summit of Garreg Fawr, Drum, Foel Fras and more.

== Similarly-named hills ==
There exist also Foel Fras (528.7 m or 1,735 ft) in central Wales, south of Machynlleth, and Foel-fras (586 m or 1,923 ft) in The Moelwyns, north east of Blaenau Ffestiniog.
