= Carnedd Llewelyn =

Mountain in north-west Wales

Coordinates: 53.160587°N 3.969305°W

- Carnedd Llywelyn
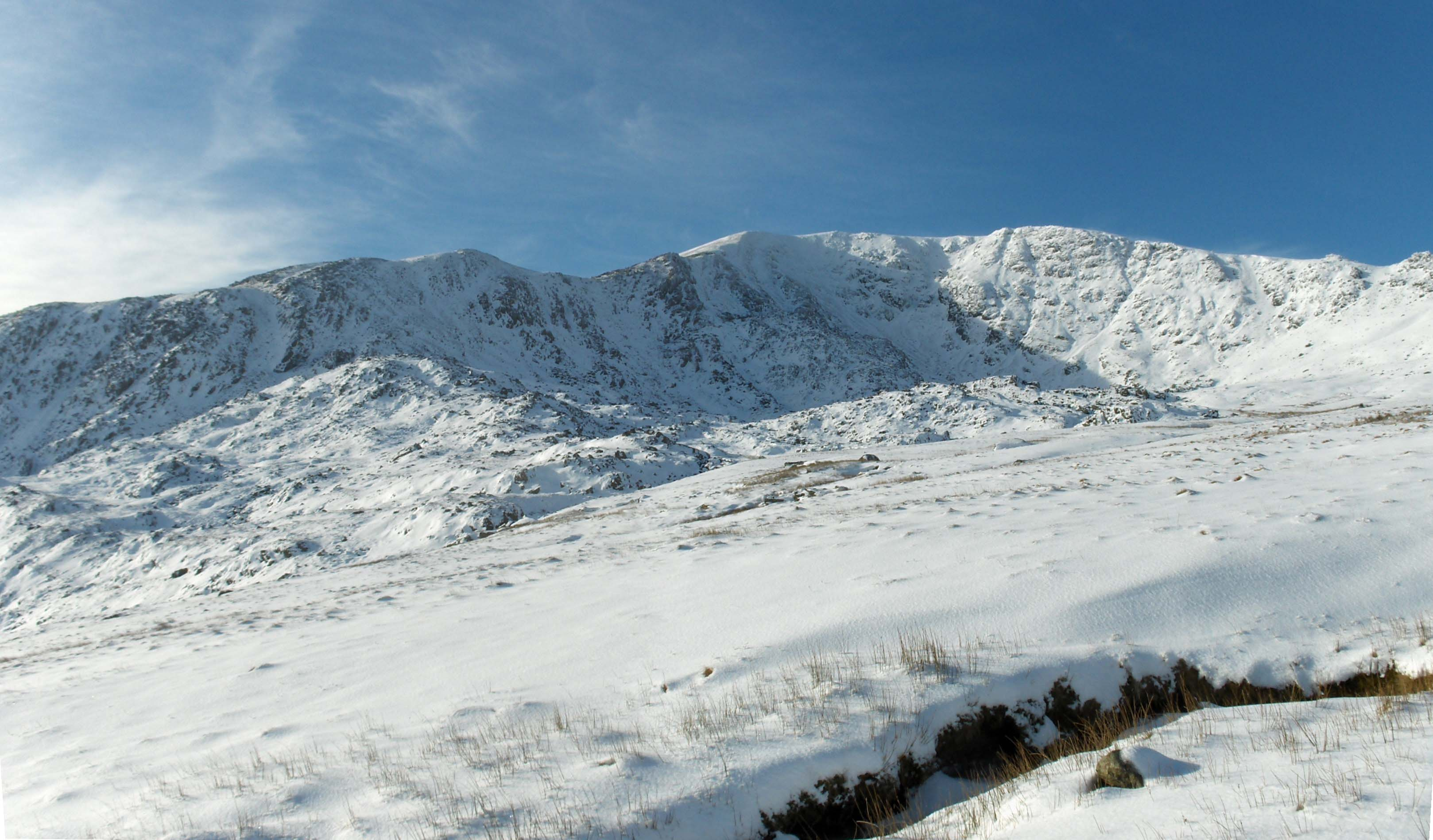

Highest point
- Elevation: 1,061.8 m (3,484 ft)
- Prominence: 747.5 m (2,452 ft)
- Parent peak: Snowdon
- Isolation: 11.72 km (7.28 mi)
- Listing: Marilyn, Hewitt, Welsh 3000s, council top, Nuttall, Furth

Naming
- English translation: Llywelyn's/Llewelyn's cairn
- Language of name: Welsh
- Pronunciation: Welsh: [ˈkarnɛð ɬəˈwɛlɨn]

Geography
- Location: Gwynedd / Conwy, Wales
- Parent range: Snowdonia
- OS grid: SH683644
- Topo map: OS Landranger 115, Explorer OL17

Climbing
- Easiest route: Hike

Listed summits of Carnedd Llewelyn
Name	Grid ref	Height	Status
Carnedd Dafydd	SH663630	1,044 m (3,425 ft)	3, H, N
Pen yr Ole Wen	SH655619	978 m (3,209 ft)	3, H, N
Foel Grach	SH688658	976 m (3,202 ft)	3, H, N
Yr Elen	SH673651	962 m (3,156 ft)	3, H, N
Foel-fras	SH696681	942 m (3,091 ft)	3, H, N
Carnedd Gwenllian	SH687669	926 m (3,038 ft)	3, H, N
Llwytmor	SH689692	849 m (2,785 ft)	H, N
Pen yr Helgi Du	SH698630	833 m (2,733 ft)	H, N
Bera Mawr	SH674682	794 m (2,605 ft)	H, N
Drum	SH708695	770 m (2,530 ft)	H, N
Drosgl	SH664679	758 m (2,487 ft)	H, N

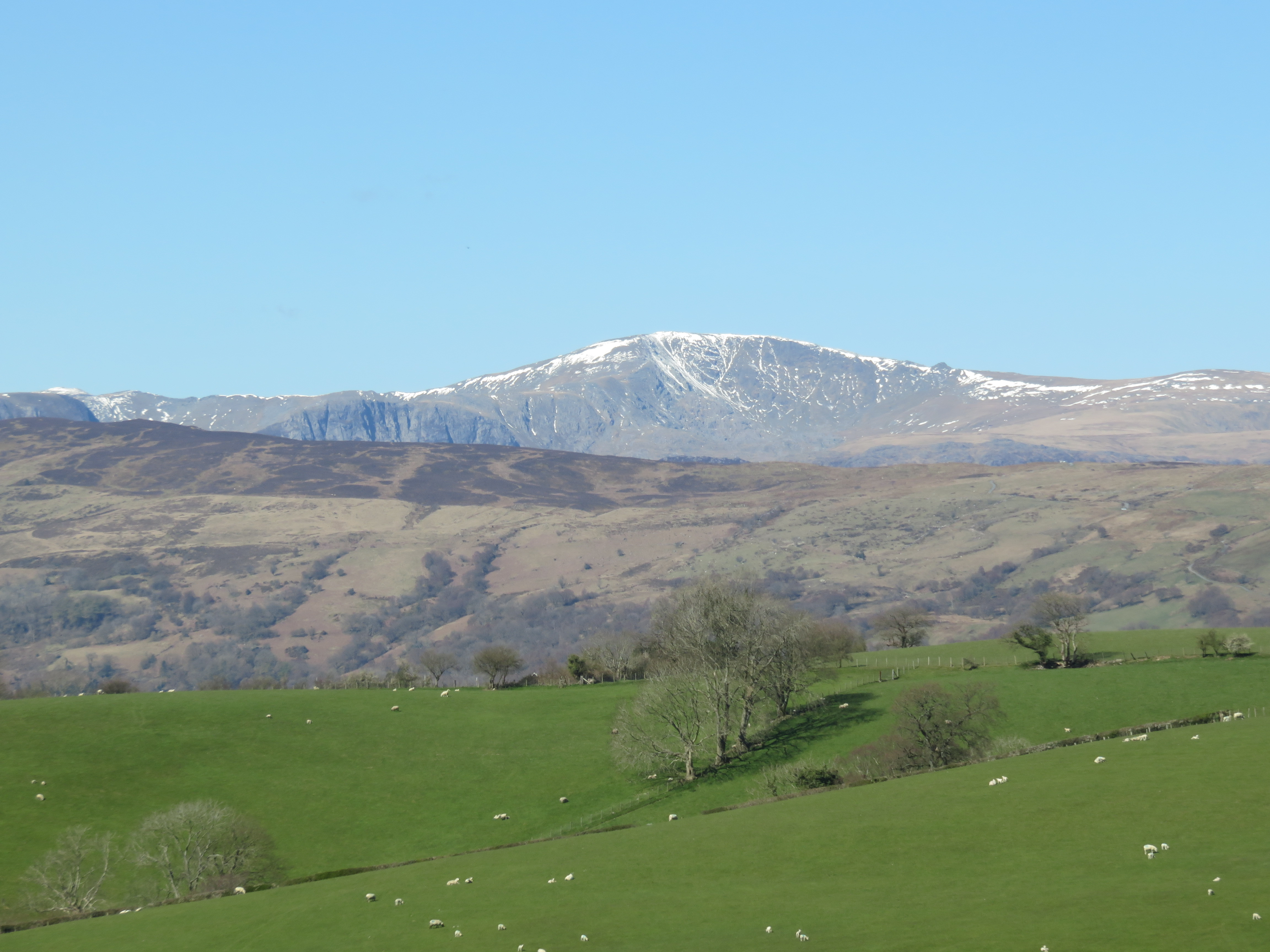
From above Llanrwst, snow still lingering in May

Carnedd Llewelyn, also spelled Carnedd Llywelyn, is a mountain massif in the Carneddau range in Snowdonia, north-west Wales. It is the highest point of the Carneddau at 1,061.8 metres (3,484 ft) and the second-highest peak by relative height in Wales, 49th in the British Isles and lies on the border between Gwynedd and Conwy.

== Topography and ascent routes ==
Carnedd Llewelyn lies in the middle of the main north-east to south-west ridge of the Carneddau, between Carnedd Dafydd to the south-west and Foel Grach to the north. A short subsidiary ridge links it to Yr Elen to the north-west. It can be climbed from Gerlan, above Bethesda, taking the path following Afon Llafar then continuing to the summit of Yr Elen before following the short ridge to Carnedd Llewelyn. Another path starts from Helyg on the A5, taking the track to the reservoir then following the slopes above Craig yr Ysfa to the summit. An alternative is to reach it by following the main ridge, either from Pen yr Ole Wen or from Foel-fras.

The summit is a flat, boulder-strewn plateau, similar to several of the other mountains that lie in the southern Carneddau. The cliffs below the ridges are well-known rock climbs, notably Ysgolion Duon (meaning "black ladders") and Craig yr Ysfa. The flat plateau means that during winter and spring, significant accumulations of snow and blizzards occur on frequent occasions. The mountain has also been noted for its long-lying snow patches in recent years, with old snow patches known to survive on its southern gullies well into July. The highest lake in Wales, Llyn Llyffant lies to the lee of the summit of Carnedd Llywelyn.

== Name ==
Carnedd Llywelyn means "Llywelyn's cairn" in Welsh. It is widely believed that Carnedd Llewelyn and the neighbouring Carnedd Dafydd are named after Llywelyn ap Gruffudd and his brother Dafydd ap Gruffudd, the last independent prince of Wales, respectively. An alternative theory is that the twin peaks are named after Llywelyn the Great, an earlier prince of Gwynedd, and his son and successor, Dafydd ap Llywelyn. Other sources cite a combination of the above, i.e. Llywelyn the Great and Dafydd ap Gruffudd.

The spelling of the name is also controversial. Carnedd Llewelyn is the form used by the Ordnance Survey, the mapping agency for Great Britain, and other sources. In Wales the spelling Carnedd Llywelyn predominates (it is used on the website of the Snowdonia National Park Authority, for example); this is also the form preferred by most Welsh writers, among others. Many authoritative works, from other study groups, also use the Welsh form. The Welsh personal name Llywelyn, from which the mountain's name is derived, is always spelt thus in the Welsh language, although the forms Llewelyn and Llewellyn are found in older English-language sources.

== Plane crash ==
On 14 March 1950 a number of Royal Air Force, Avro Lincoln's from No. 230 Operational Conversion Unit RAF took off from RAF Scampton bound for RAF Hemswell, England on a night-time cross-country exercise. In the early hours of 15 March a controller at RAF Barton Hall instructed three of the Lincolns to divert to RAF Valley, Anglesey, Wales due to bad weather at RAF Scampton. It was at 2:55 am GMT that one of the Avro Lincoln's (RF511) had gone missing and the other two aircraft landed safely five minutes later. The wreckage of RF511 was found at 5:20 GMT on Carnedd Llewelyn and it was confirmed that all six crew had died. The subsequent Court of Inquiry determined that the likely cause of the crash was pilot error; the crew had turned onto a southeasterly course over Anglesey instead of the reciprocal out to sea. The pilot misheard the instruction to "turn 180 degrees" as "turn 80 degrees", resulting in a controlled flight into terrain.

The wreckage of RF511 remains on the mountain, and in 2002 a memorial plaque was placed at the crash site.

== Cultural references ==
The mountain features in Welsh poetry and literature; the earliest known work is a poem by Rhys Goch Eryri, Carnedd Llywelyn, composed c. 1400.

The Aetherius Society considers it to be one of its 19 holy mountains.
