= Carnedd Gwenllian =

Mountain summit in Wales

Coordinates: 53.18295°N 3.96630°W

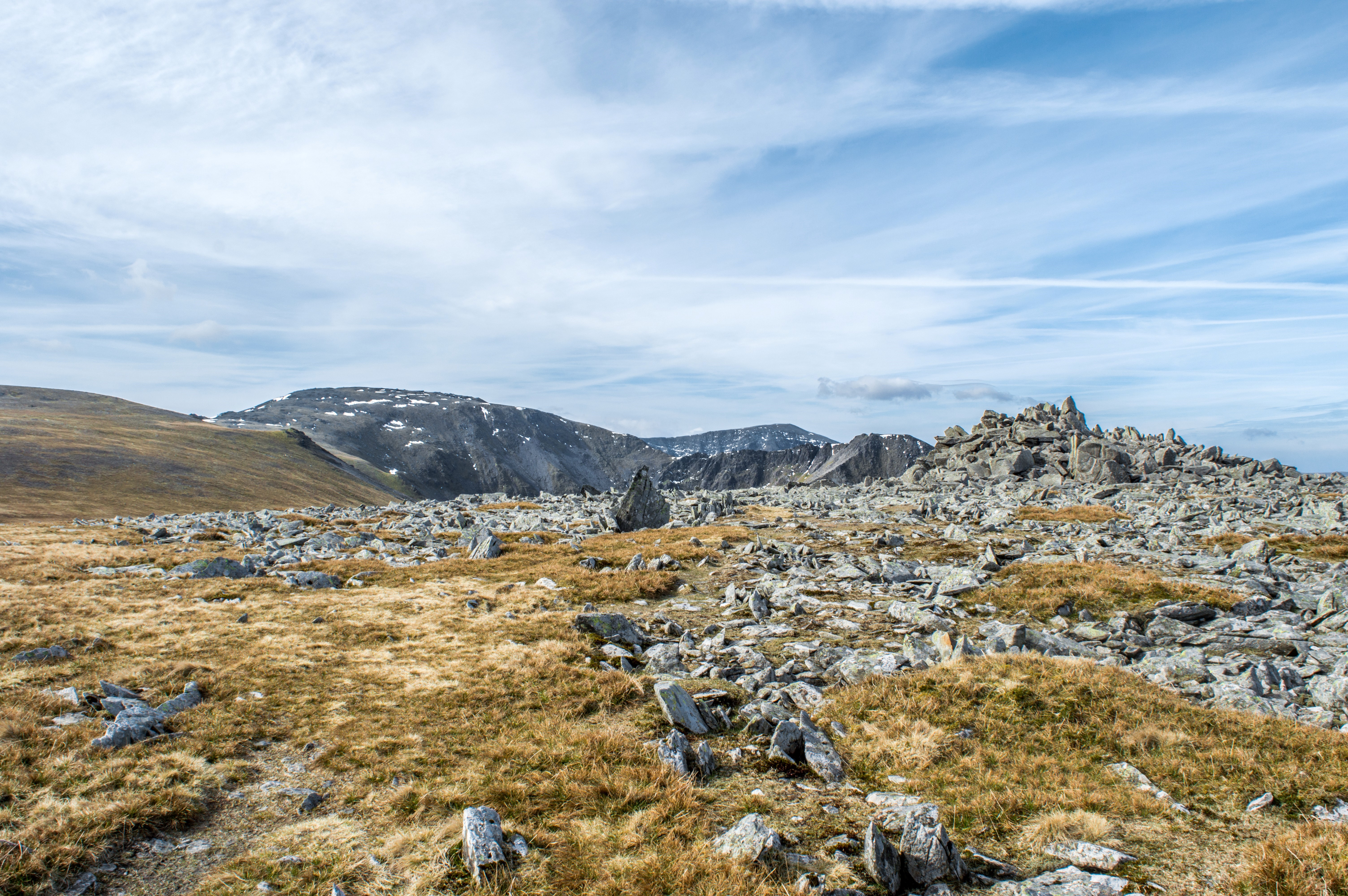
- Rocky summit of Carnedd Gwenllian looking South-southwest across the Carneddau

Highest point
- Elevation: 925 m (3,035 ft)
- Prominence: 33 m (108 ft)
- Parent peak: Foel-fras
- Listing: Hewitt, Welsh 3000s, Nuttall, Furth

Naming
- Language of name: Welsh
- Pronunciation: Welsh: [ˈkarnɛð ɡwɛnˈɬiː.an]

Geography
- Location: Snowdonia, Wales
- OS grid: SH687669

Listed summits of Carnedd Gwenllian
Name	Grid ref	Height	Status
Bera Bach		807 m (2,648 ft)	sub Hewitt, Nuttall, Furth

Carnedd Gwenllian, previously known as Carnedd Uchaf until 2009, is a minor summit of the Carneddau range in Snowdonia, Wales, and included in the Welsh 3000s. From the summit, distant views to the north can extend as far as Ireland and the Isle of Man, and to the South as far as the Berwyn Ranges.

It lies between Foel Fras and Foel Grach, but is not always included in the Welsh 3000s, as its summit rises only slightly above the ridge. However, it is classed as a Hewitt. Its slopes, like all those in the northern Carneddau, are largely grassy, although they are steep. The slopes can receive significant accumulations of snow-drifts during blizzards in winter. In the past, snow beds have survived on the mountain as far as June. The annual average temperature on Carnedd Uchaf is relatively cold, ranging between 4-5 degrees Celsius.

For some years there was a campaign by the Princess Gwenllian Society to have the name of this peak changed from Carnedd Uchaf to Carnedd Gwenllian. Gwenllian of Wales (1282–1337) was the only daughter of Llywelyn ap Gruffudd. After her father's death, and when still an infant, she was taken to a nunnery at Sempringham in Lincolnshire and held captive there until she died. In September 2009, the summit was renamed Carnedd Gwenllian, and the Ordnance Survey agreed to use the dual name Carnedd Uchaf/Carnedd Gwenllian on its maps from 2010 onwards.
