= Donald Bailey (civil engineer) =

British civil engineer

Sir Donald Coleman Bailey
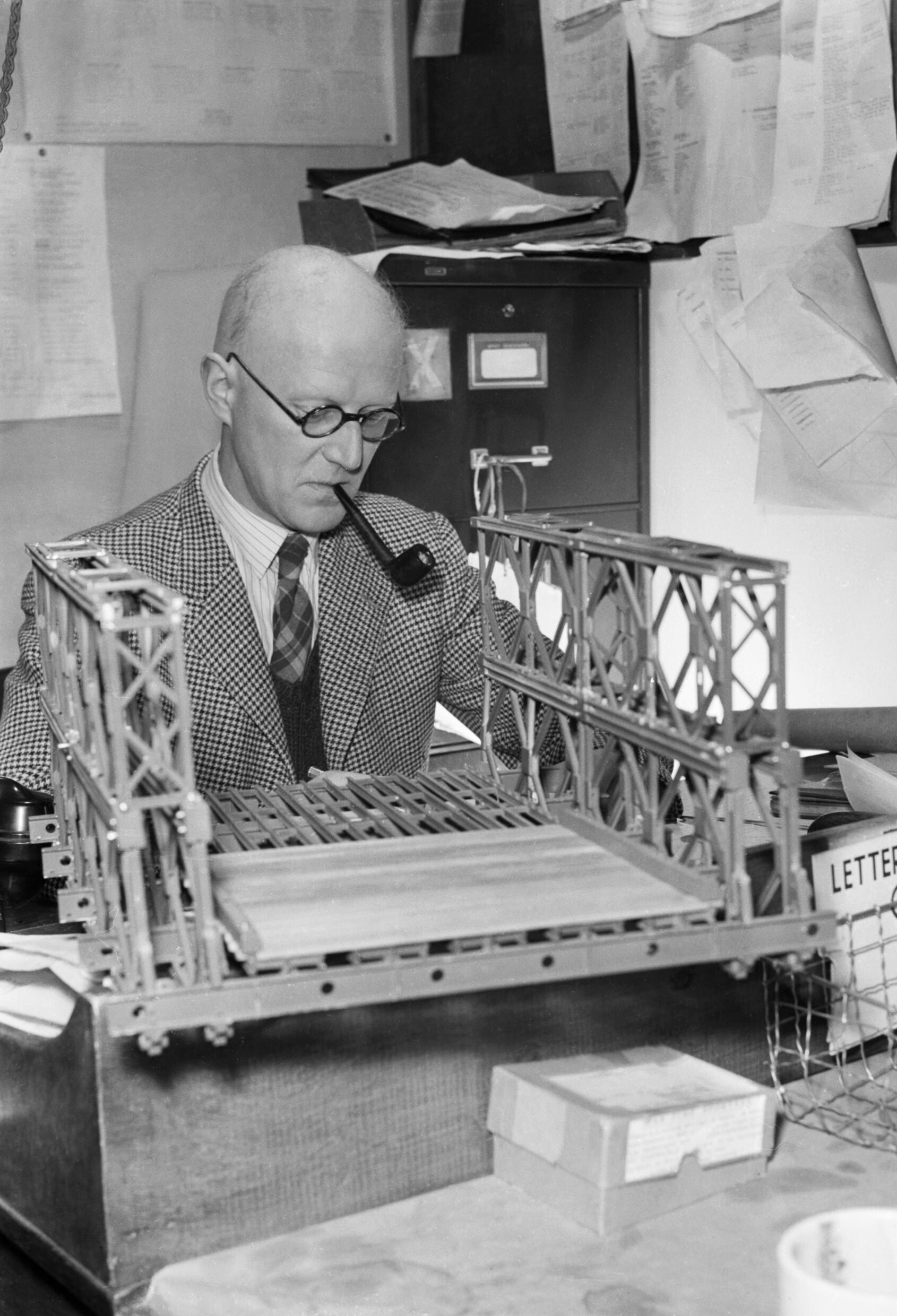
- DC Bailey with a model of a section of Bailey bridge
- Born: 15 September 1901; Rotherham, Yorkshire, England
- Died: 5 May 1985 (aged 83); Bournemouth, Dorset, England
- Education: University of Sheffield
- Occupation: Civil Engineer
- Known for: Bailey bridge

Sir Donald Coleman Bailey, OBE (15 September 1901 – 5 May 1985) was an English civil engineer who invented the Bailey bridge. Field Marshal Montgomery is recorded as saying that "without the Bailey bridge, we should not have won the war."

== Background ==
Bailey attended Rotherham Grammar School and The Leys School in Cambridge. He read for a BEng degree at the University of Sheffield and graduated in 1923.

Bailey was a civil servant in the War Office when he designed his bridge. Another engineer, A. M. Hamilton, successfully demonstrated that the Bailey bridge breached a patent on the Callender-Hamilton bridge, though the Bailey bridge was generally regarded as being superior for temporary use. Because the bridge used a pin joining system similar to that used in the Martel Bridge designed by Lt.-General Sir Giffard Le Quesne Martel, Hamilton also told the commission the Bailey bridge should be called a 'Martel Mk2', and Martel was later awarded £500 for infringement on the design of his box girder bridge.

Bailey was knighted in 1946 for his bridge design. By this time he was living quietly in Southbourne in Bournemouth. Dorothy Barnes, one of the girls at the Southbourne Crossroads bank, which he used regularly was surprised to learn that her unassuming customer had been knighted. He died in Bournemouth in 1985. There is, as yet, no blue plaque in Bournemouth to commemorate him. His 1940s home was demolished c 2004 and replaced by flats, although he also had other addresses in Bournemouth, being recorded in 1974 at 14 Viking Close, as Bailey, Sir Donald C. OBE, JP. The house in which Bailey was born, 24 Albany Street, Rotherham is still standing.

During the Second World War, there was a factory making the components for the Bailey bridge in the neighbouring town of Christchurch, where a section of bridge still remains, at a retail park in Barrack Road. The components were shipped to training grounds in (what is now) Cumbria, where men learned the difficult technique of assembling them in rivers at night, to simulate combat conditions.

Field Marshal Bernard Montgomery wrote in 1947:

Bailey Bridging made an immense contribution towards ending World War II. As far as my own operations were concerned, with the Eighth Army in Italy and with the 21 Army Group in North West Europe, I could never have maintained the speed and tempo of forward movement without large supplies of Bailey Bridging.

== Honours and awards ==
- 4 January 1943 - Officer of the Order of the British Empire (OBE) for Donald Coleman Bailey, Esq., O.B.E., A.M.Inst.C.E., Assistant Superintendent and Chief Designer, Experimental Bridging Establishment, Ministry of Supply.
- 1 January 1946 - Knighthood for Donald Coleman Bailey, Esq., O.B.E., A.M.Inst.C.E., Acting Superintendent, Experimental Bridging Establishment, Ministry of Supply.
- 1 January 1948 - Commander of the Order of Orange-Nassau for services during the war.

== Gallery ==
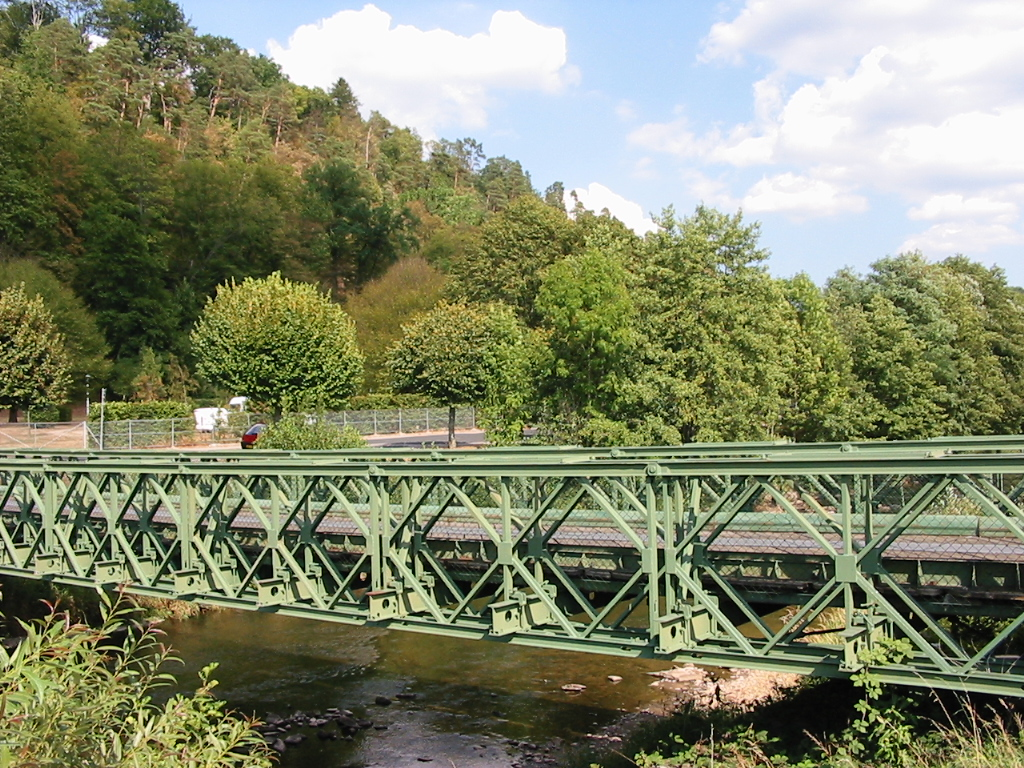
Bailey bridge over the Meurthe River, France.

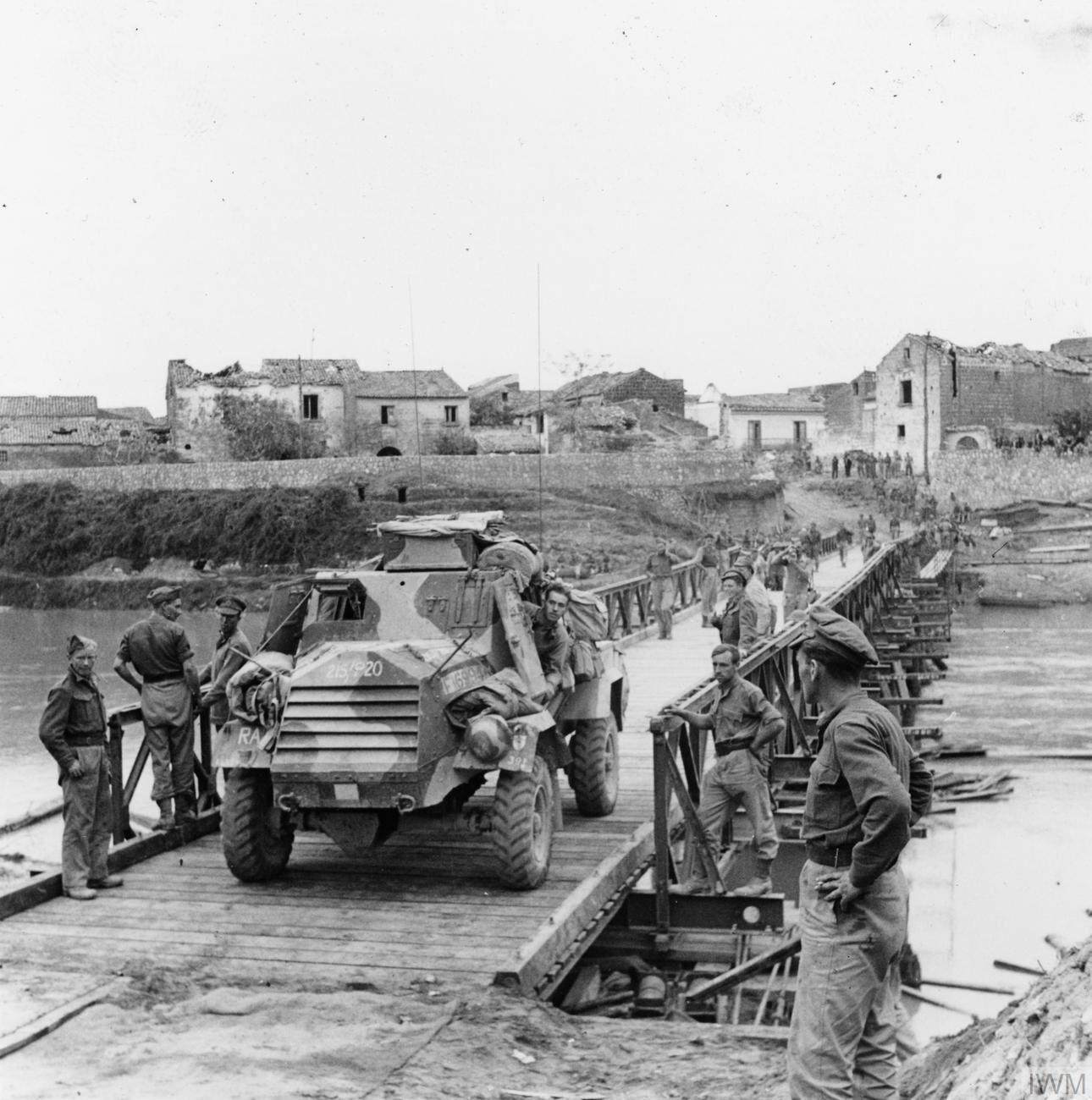
An Otter Light Reconnaissance Car crossing a Bailey bridge over the Volturno river at Grazzanise, 14–16 October 1943.

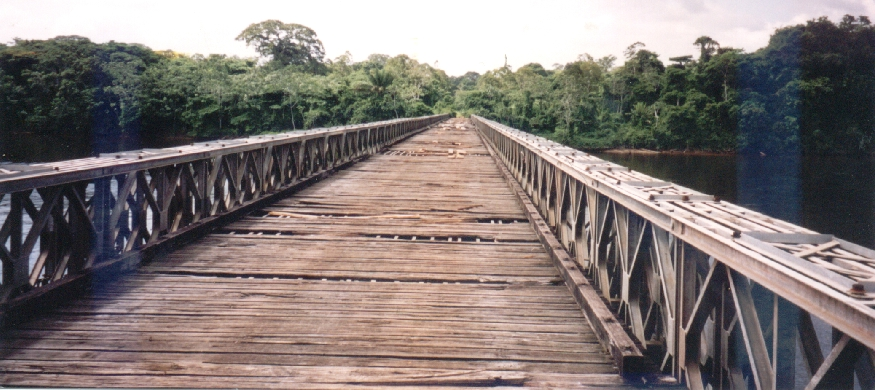
Bailey bridge over the Coppename river, Bitagron, Suriname

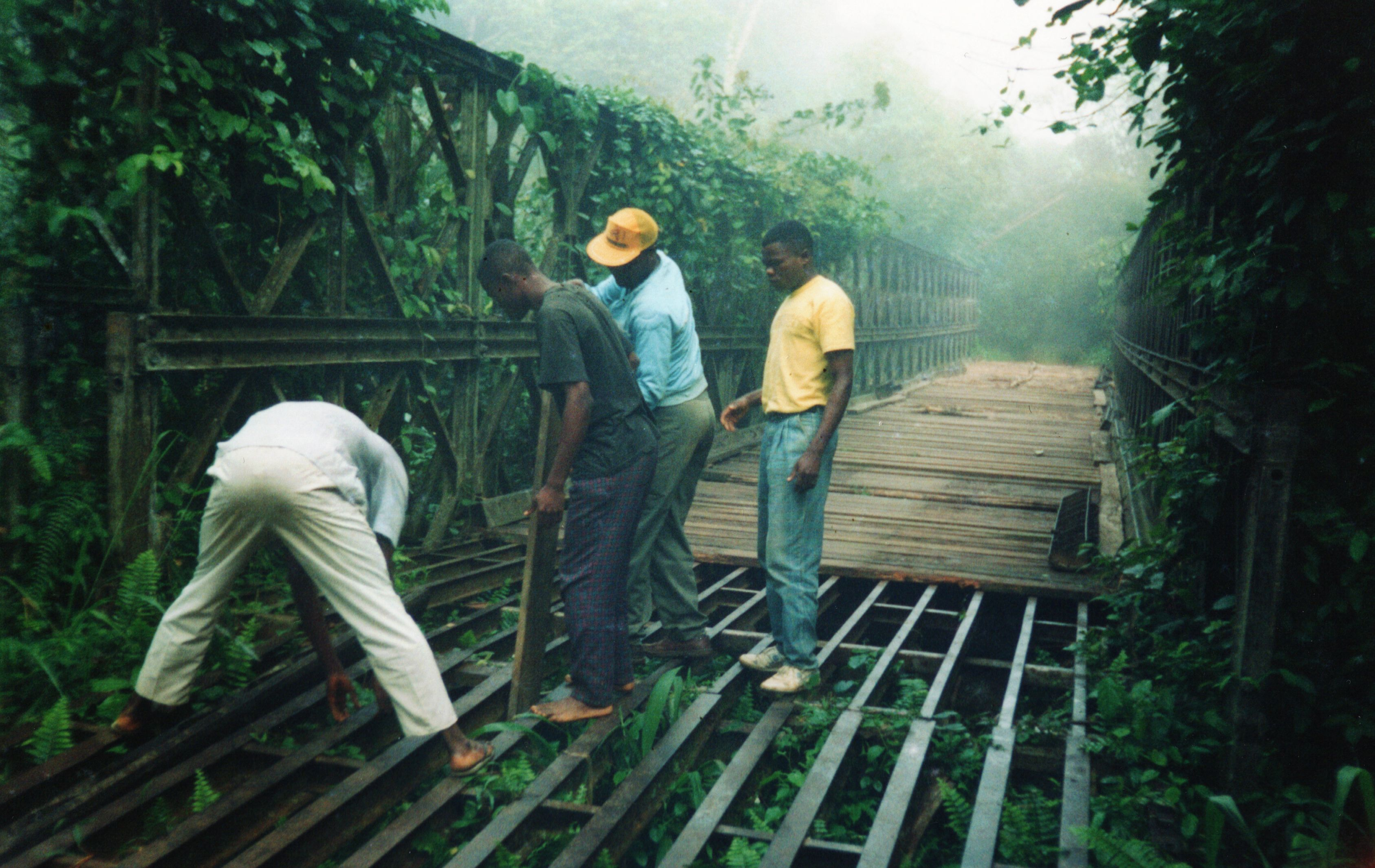
Bolifa Bailey Bridge in the Equatorial rainforest near Basankusu, Democratic Republic of Congo
