= Kyaka Bridge =

Kyaka Bridge Daraja la Kyaka (Swahili)
- Coordinates: 1°15′0.55″S 31°25′10.44″E
- Carries: B8 road (2 lanes)
- Crosses: Kagera River
- Other name(s): Kagera River Bridge
- Owner: Government of Tanzania
- Preceded by: Rusomo Bridge

Characteristics
- Material: Steel

History
- Fabrication by: Painter Brothers
- Opened: 1992

Kyaka Bridge, sometimes referred to as the Kagera Bridge, is a bridge in Tanzania that crosses the Kagera River. The bridge was blown up by Ugandan experts from Kilembe Mines in 1978 during the Uganda–Tanzania War.

The present (truss) bridge is a Callender-Hamilton bridge supplied by the British structural steelwork fabricators Painter Brothers.
