= Painter Brothers =

Steel fabricator

- Type: Private limited company
- Industry: structural steelwork
- Founded: 1920
- Headquarters: Hereford, England

Painter Brothers is a major British fabricator of structural steelwork and one of the leading producers of bolted lattice steelwork in the world.

== History ==
Painter Brothers was founded in Hereford, England in 1920 and incorporated on 21 March 1929.

In conjunction with Callender's Cable and Construction Co Ltd, Painter Brothers provided the steelwork for the first Callender-Hamilton unit-construction hangars ordered by the British Air Ministry in the pre-World War II rearmament programme.

The company manufactured the Skylon, the iconic ‘Vertical Feature’ that was the emblematic symbol of the 1951 Festival of Britain.

In 1955, Painter Brothers became a member of the BICC plc group of companies and now operates within the Balfour Beatty Power Networks Division. This has enabled the company to offer a fully integrated service that includes all aspects of overhead electrical transmission with worldwide distribution.

In 1968, the company was awarded the Queen's Award to Industry for Export Achievement.

== Operations ==
All manufacturing is carried out at the Hereford site. Accurate fabrication of all structures is achieved by the full use of computer controlled production techniques.

The company specialises in the manufacture of:

- Callender-Hamilton lattice girder bridge systems.
- Communications masts and towers for radio and television broadcasting and for microwave and satellite communications.
- Galvanised steel towers for the electrical transmission and distribution industries.
- Lattice distribution poles, sub-station support steelwork, flare stack support structures, rail electrification gantry structures and crossarm steelwork.

== Major projects ==
- Kyaka Bridge in Tanzania with a reduced centre span to allow maximum clearance for shipping.
- Chumphon Rail Bridge in Thailand located on the main southern line between Bangkok and the Malaysian border.
- Crystal Palace Tower in London.
- Gorai River Bridge in Bangladesh.
- Tal-y-Cafn Bridge in North Wales. The bridge is a Callender-Hamilton Type B10.
- Tekezé River Bridge in Ethiopia.
