= GCW =

GCW may refer to:

- Game Changer Wrestling, an American professional wrestling promotion
- Garden City Western Railway
- GCW Zero, a video game console
- Georgia Championship Wrestling, a former American professional wrestling promotion
- Glan Conwy railway station, in Wales
- Grand Canyon West Airport, serving Peach Springs, Arizona
- Great Canadian Wrestling, a Canadian professional wrestling promotion
- Gross combined weight rating
- Galactic Civil War, a conflict in the Star Wars Original Trilogy
