= George Cohen, Sons and Company =

British scrap metal merchant

George Cohen, Sons and Company was a scrap metal merchant with offices in Commercial Road, London. The company was founded by George Henry Cohen (d.1890) as Messrs. George Cohen & Co. in 1834 and changed its name to George Cohen, Sons and Co. in 1883 on the appointment of Michael Cohen, son of the founder. After the First World War the company won a number of large contracts to dispose of surplus munitions including "400,000 tons of high explosives and other shells". The company also engaged in demolition work, with projects including the towers of Crystal Palace, which had survived the great fire, the Dome of Discovery and Skylon at the Festival of Britain, and London's tram system. In 1940 the company moved its head offices to Hammersmith.

In 1956 a holding company, 'The George Cohen 600 Group Limited', was formed to control the original company and its many subsidiaries. The '600 Group' name, derived from the company first address, 600 Commercial Road, had been in informal use since 1945 or earlier.

In 1970 the '600 Group' set up a joint venture, 'Six Hundred Metal Holdings', with Thorn Electrical Industries to operate the two companies' metal-handling businesses. In 1975 the company name was changed to 'The 600 Group Limited', and in 1981 to 'The 600 Group PLC'.

In 1987 George Cohen, Sons and Company was renamed to GCS (Steels) Limited, part of the 600 Group. The scrap metal business was acquired by Monks Ferry (Ship Breaking) Ltd. of St. Helens near Warrington in Merseyside..

The head office of GCS Steels was based at Stanningley Works, off Town Street in Stanningley, Leeds. This site operated up until its closure in 1999. The site covered approximately 14 acres (6 ha) of land and had also been the base of several other companies that operated under the banner of the 600 Group. In the heyday of the metals trades the site had its own siding to transport large quantities of steel products.

In 2013 GCS Steels (Gosport) closed, and GCS Steels became a subsidiary of Pyramid Trading Limited.

== Subsidiary companies ==
The following companies were members of the '600 Group' at some time. This information was obtained from the company's annual reports published in The Times newspaper.

=== Raw Materials Division ===
- George Cohen and Armstrong Disposal Corporation, formed June 1923 jointly with Sir W. G. Armstrong, Whitworth, and Co. to dispose of government surplus stock. The liquidation process ended in 1927.
- Pollock Brown & Co. Ltd., scrap merchants, reported 1957
- Westbourne Park Coal & Iron Co. Ltd., reported 1957
- Southall & Hayes Coal & Iron Co. Ltd., reported 1957
- George Cohen Australia Scrap Co., registered 1960
- Proler Cohen, scrap processing, Willesden, set up 1966. Run by 600 Ferrous Fragmentisers Ltd. The Proler process, licensed from the Proler Steel Corporation of Houston, Texas, was not immediately successful but was working by the end of 1969.

=== Steel Foundry Division ===
- K & L Steelfounders And Engineers Limited., Letchworth, founded 1915 as Kryn & Lahy, acquired May 1928, manufacturers of Jones Mobile and Railway Cranes. A new factory at Halstead, Essex opened 1958. Company renamed as Jones Cranes Limited in 1968.
  - K. & L. subsidiary in Toronto, opened 1953
- T. C. Jones & Co. Limited, Wood Lane, structural engineers (noted in 1947). Factory at Treorchy, Glamorganshire built 1947. Reinforcement works, Neasden, opened Dec 1955.
- Dunlop & Ranken, Leeds, steel merchants, acquired Jan 1956, sold to British Steel Corporation 1980
- New London Electron Works Ltd., powder metallurgy, noted 1953
- Western Metallurgical Industries Ltd., Neath, noted 1953
- F. J. Edwards Ltd., London, acquired 1966
- Barnes & Bell, Glasgow, steel stockholders, acquired 1967
- Jones Reinforcement, spun off from T. C. Jones in 1969

=== Machinery Division ===
- Campbell Gas Engine Co. Ltd., acquired 1928
- Messrs. Estler Brothers, Ltd., London, metal workers, acquired 1936
- Works, Hebburn-on-Tyne, noted 1947
- Colchester Lathe Co., acquired 1954
- Colchester Machinery Corporation Ltd., Toronto, mentioned 1957, shut down 1961
- Colchester Werkzeugmaschinen GmbH, set up 1958
- Gamet Products Ltd., Colchester, precision bearings, reported 1956
- Midgley and Sutcliffe Ltd., drilling machines, acquired 1954
- Selson Machine Tool Co., Ltd., London NW10, mentioned 1953-1957
- Henry Osman & Co. Ltd., drainage engineers, reported 1956-7
- Browett, Lindley & Co, compressors (acquired 1929, noted 1947)
- Coborn, engines, noted 1947
- Metalclad, Limited, Neath and Stanningley, woodworking machinery, reported 1947; iron foundry at Morriston noted 1953
- Machinery Works, Kingsbury, noted 1947
- F. Burnerd & Co., Ltd., (est. c. 1913), precision chucks, noted 1953
- Machine Tool Works, Stockport, acquired 1958
- G. Beaton & Son Ltd., vehicle component manufacturers, acquired 1958
- Richmond Machine Tool Co. Ltd., mentioned 1963
- W. E. Sykes, machine tools, acquired 1966
- George Cohen Machinery, mentioned in The Times in 1967 as 'the largest plant hire firm in the country'
- John A. Dick Holdings, owners of British Hoist & Crane Co., acquired 1967
- Six Hundred South Africa (Pty), Johannesburg, expanded 1967
- Jones Cranes Limited formed in 1938, from crane business of K. & L. Steelfounders. Closed in the 1990s. Successful revival in 2005 by a Sussex-based private engineering company.
- Dickson (Engineering), acquired 1970

=== After the Thorn merger, 1970 ===
- Six Hundred Metal Holdings, joint-owned by Thorn Electrical Industries, set up 1970
- T. S. Harrison & Sons, lathes, acquired 1971
- Startrite Engineering, acquired 1981
- F. Pratt Engineering, lathe chucks, acquired 1981
- 600 Fanuc Robotics, Colchester, partnership with Fujitsu, 1983
- Industrial Distribution Group of Clausing Corp., acquired 1985
- Electrox lasers, acquired 1986
- 600 Machine Tools, 600 Electrox Laser, and 600 Technologies divisions formed in 2006
- Colchester-Harrison, formed 2006
- Ealing Electro Optics plc, acquired 1988
- Metal Muncher, USA, 2000

== Chairmen ==
=== As George Cohen, Sons & Co. Ltd. ===
- a.1920-1928 George Levy (joined in 1908)
- 1928-1947 Lawrence Levy (1876–1950)
- 1947-Dec 1967 Cyril M. Cohen (grandson of founder)

=== As 600 Group ===
- Dec 1967-Apr 1987 Jack Alfred Wellings (b. 1917; knighted 1975 for services to export)
- Apr 1987-Dec 31, 1992 Jeffrey Benson
- Jan 1, 1993-2006 Michael Wright
- 2007-2011 Paul Temple
- 2011- Paul Dupee

== Bibliography ==
- C.E.G. Nye et al., One Hundred Years 1834-1934, George Cohen Sons and Company Limited, Robert Maclehose & Co Ltd, Glasgow, Nov. 1934
- Wellings, Jack, 600 Makes It!, The 600 Group Plc, 1983
