= Jubilee Gardens, Lambeth =

Park in London

Coordinates: 51.5038°N 0.1184°W

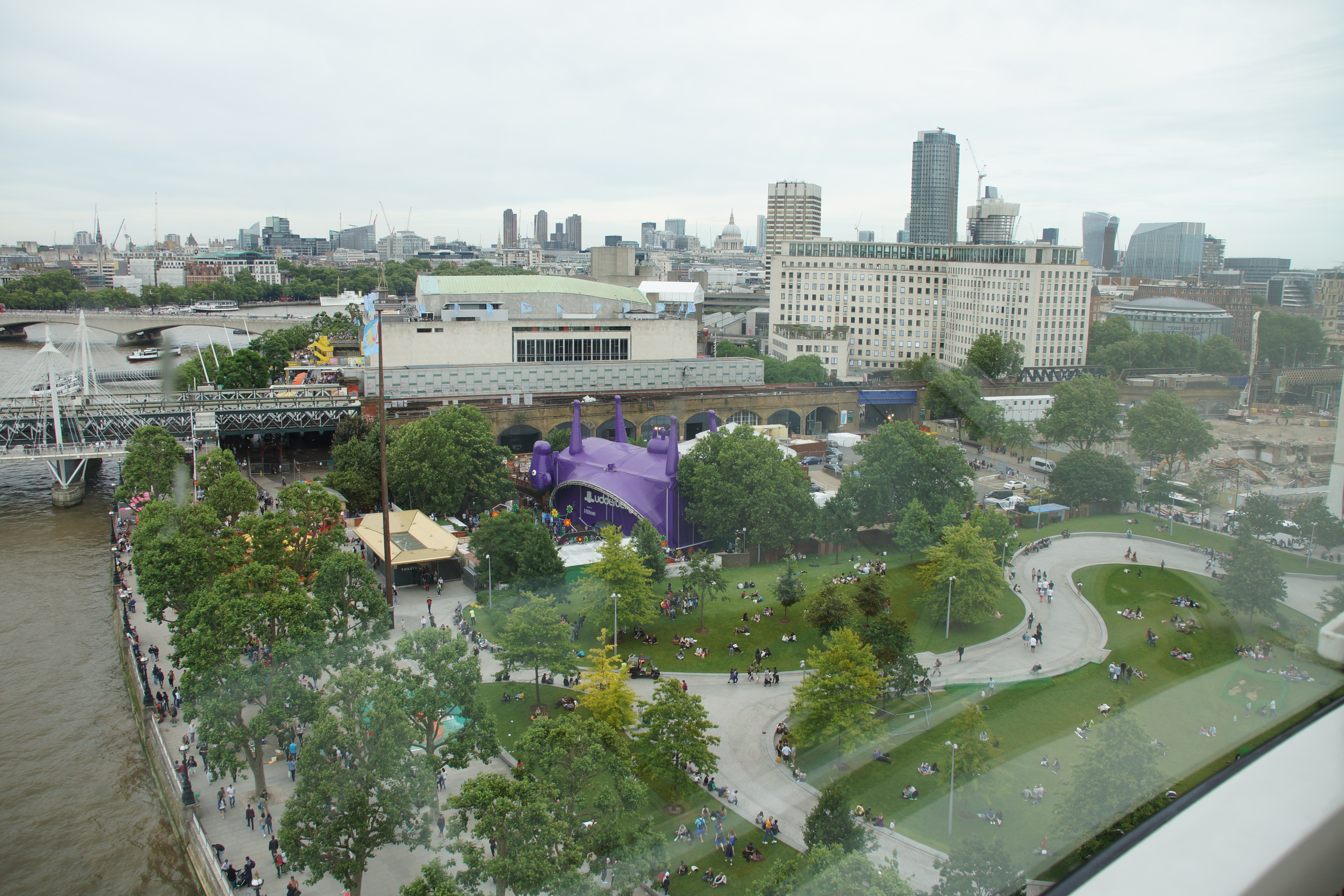
View of the gardens from the London Eye

Jubilee Gardens is a public park on the South Bank in the London Borough of Lambeth located between the London Eye and the River Thames. The Gardens include lawns, flower beds, around 80 trees, seating areas and a children’s playground. The site attracts approximately 5.5 million visitors annually and is one of the most heavily used green spaces in central London.

The Gardens are owned and managed by the Jubilee Gardens Trust, an independent local charity formed to oversee the care and maintenance of the site. The Trust’s objectives include the provision of public recreation facilities, environmental improvement and the education of the public about the history of the area.

== History ==
The site now occupied by Jubilee Gardens forms part of London’s South Bank and has undergone several major transformations over the last two centuries. Historically, the area consisted of marshland and riverside wharves associated with industrial and commercial activity along the River Thames.

In 1951, the site became one of the principal locations of the Festival of Britain, a national exhibition intended to promote post-war recovery, science, design and the arts in the United Kingdom. Jubilee Gardens was the location of the Dome of Discovery, at the time the world’s largest dome structure, and stood adjacent to the Skylon, a temporary vertical structure which became one of the most recognisable symbols of the Festival. Both structures were dismantled shortly after the event ended, leaving little surviving physical evidence of this phase of the site’s history.

Following the Festival, the site was used as the Waterloo Air Terminal and heliport, providing passenger connections to airports and continental destinations. In later decades the site was used as a car park for County Hall, the headquarters of the London County Council and later the Greater London Council (GLC).

The Gardens themselves were first formally opened as a public park in 1977 to mark the Silver Jubilee of Queen Elizabeth II, from which the site takes its current name. During the 1970s and 1980s, the open space, being adjacent to the GLC building, became associated with civic activity and public protest connected with wider debates about redevelopment and planning in central London.

A multimillion-pound redevelopment of the park was completed in May 2012 ahead of the London 2012 Olympic and Paralympic Games in order to transform it from a state of grassland to a mature looking park with trees and hills. The re-developed Gardens were designed by Dutch landscape architects West 8. The redesigned park was officially opened by Queen Elizabeth II in October 2012 as part of her Diamond Jubilee year.

== Memorials ==
The park is the site of a memorial to the casualties of the International Brigades of the Spanish Civil War, especially the British Battalion which suffered heavy casualties during the conflict. The memorial was unveiled in 1985 and serves as a focal point for annual commemorative events organised by the International Brigade Memorial Trust. The sculpture was created by Ian Walters, a British sculptor known for a number of public memorials and political works across the United Kingdom.

There is also a paving stone at the foot of the flagpole in memory of John Dimmer (VC) an officer of the King’s Royal Rifle Corps and recipient of the Victoria Cross during the First World War. Dimmer was awarded the VC in 1914 for his actions under fire at Klein Zillebeke in Belgium.

== Nearby ==
The park's neighbours are the London Eye, the Shell Centre, County Hall and the River Thames.

== Gallery ==
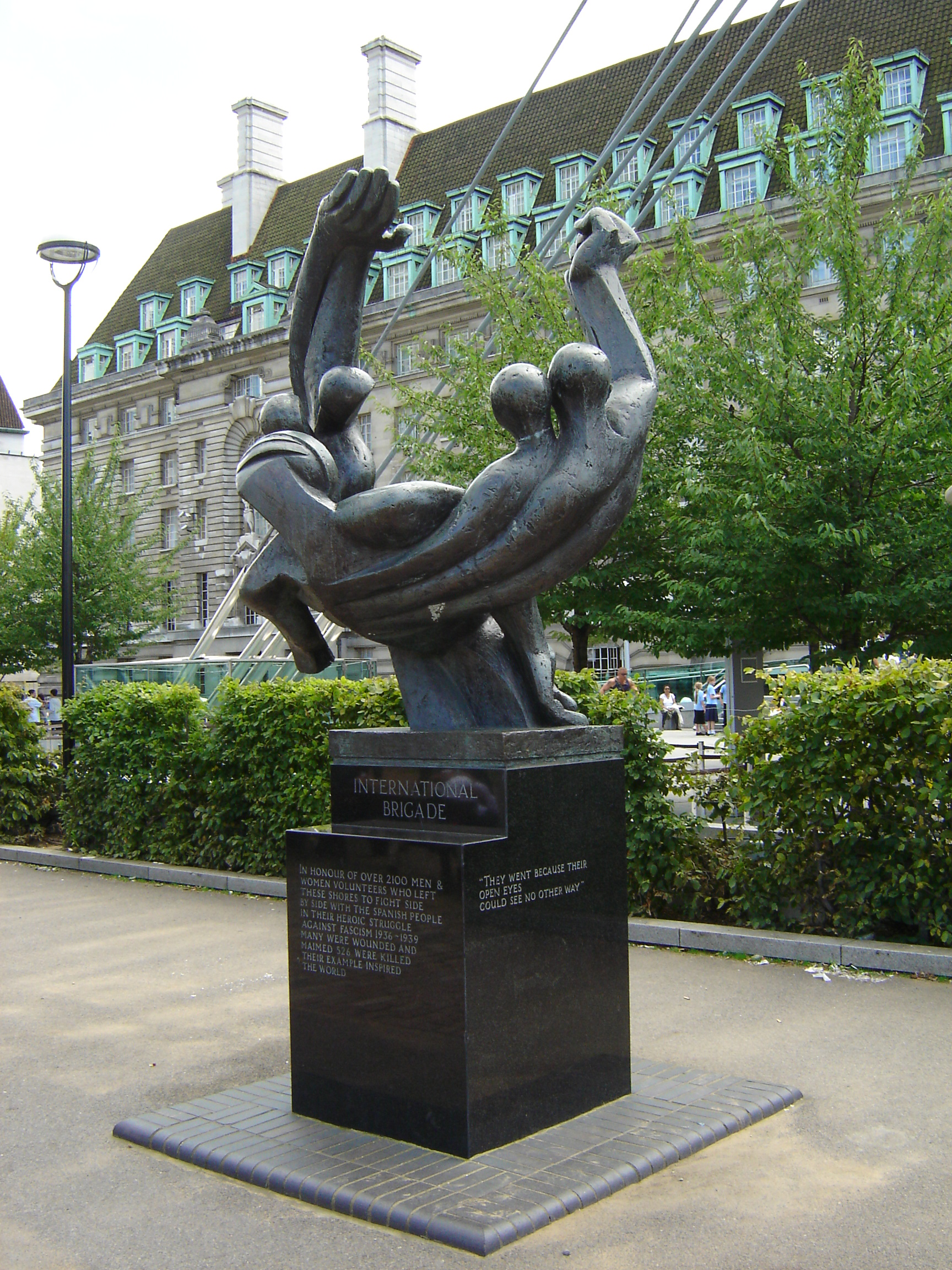
International Brigades Memorial with LCC building. Stays for the London Eye can also be seen.

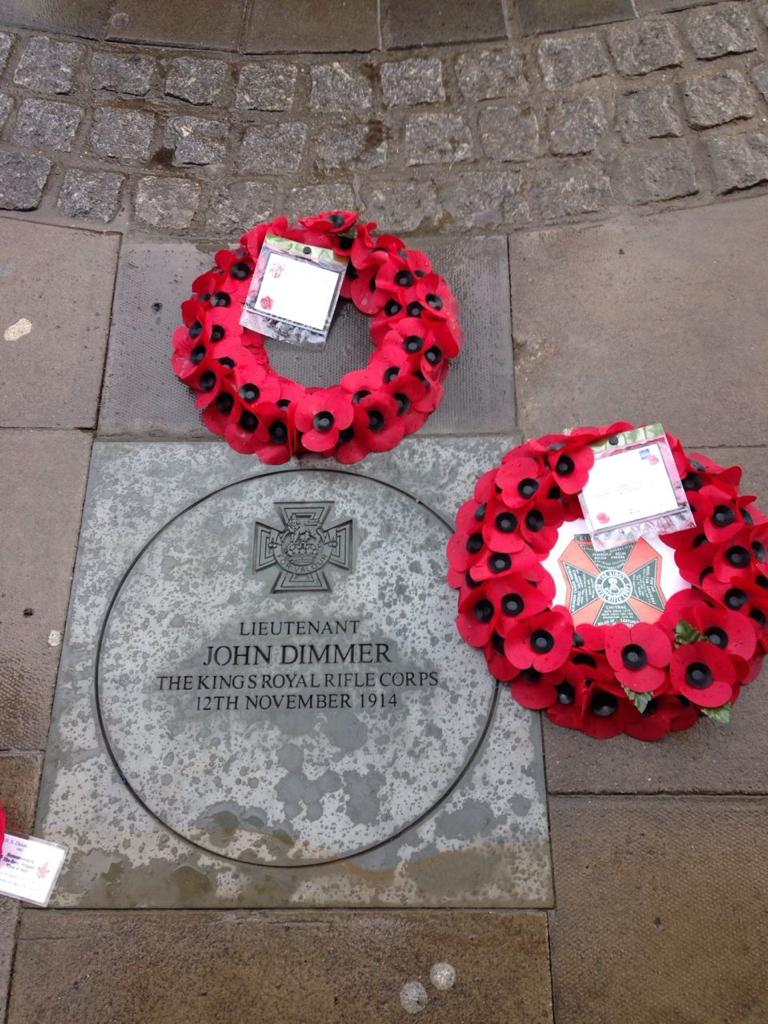
Commemorative plaque in memory of John Dimmer

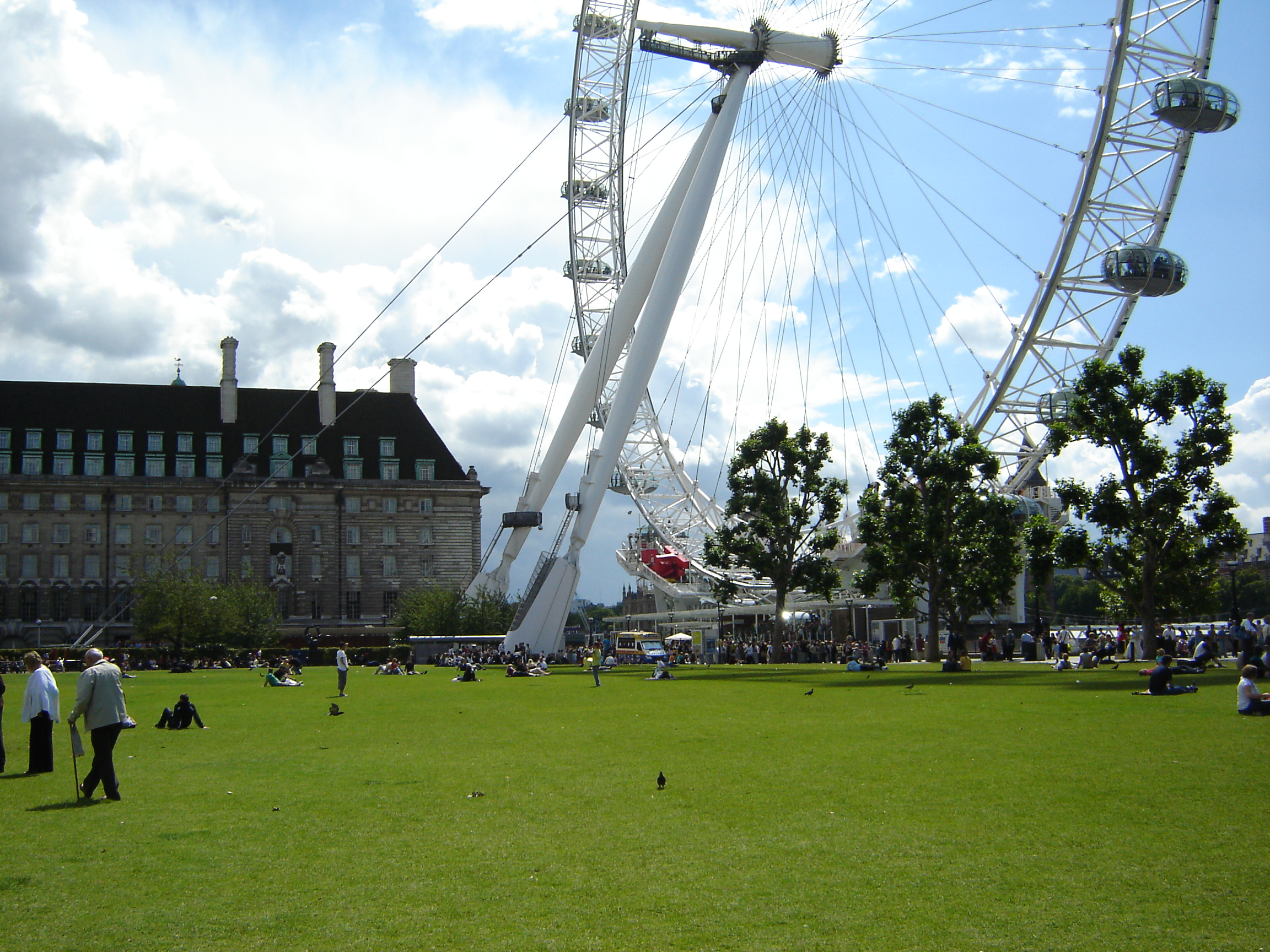
London Eye and LCC building from the middle of Jubilee Gardens, in its former state as grassland.

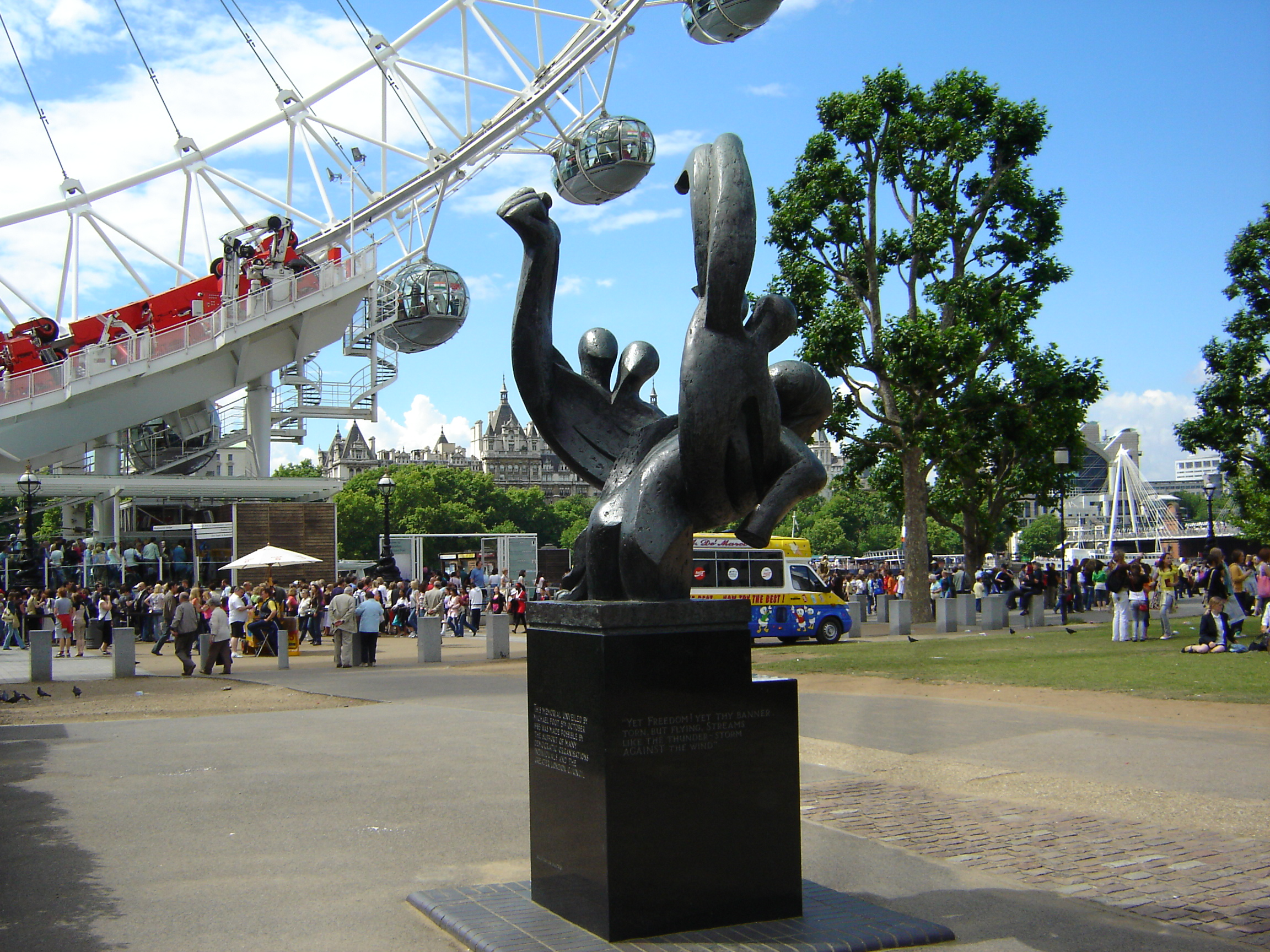
International Brigades Memorial with London Eye in the background.

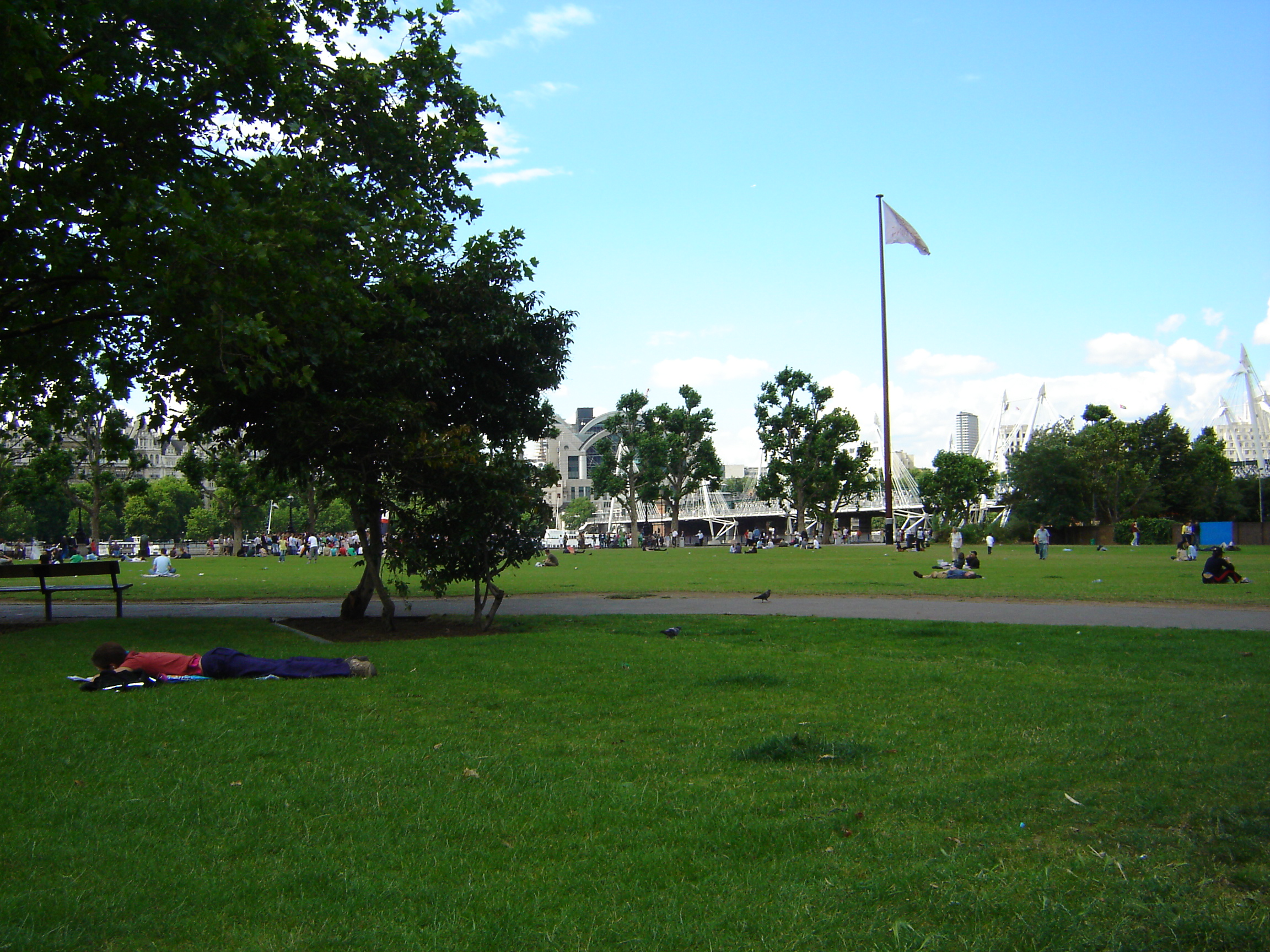
View of Jubilee Gardens before redevelopment, with Hungerford Bridge in background.

== See also ==
- Parks and open spaces in London
