= Skylon (Festival of Britain) =

Former public artwork in London

Coordinates: 51°30′17″N 0°7′7″W

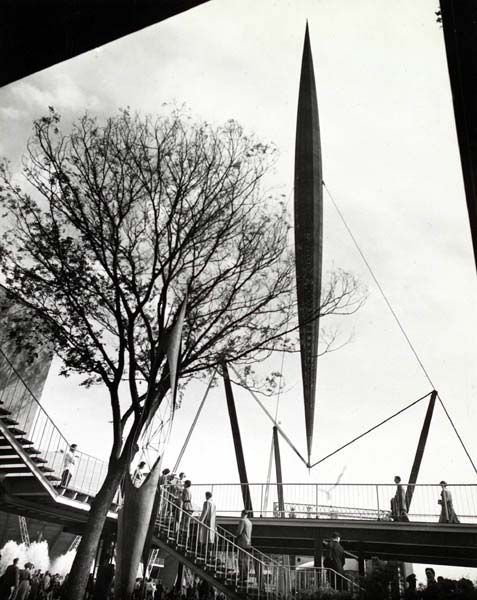
The Skylon at the Festival of Britain, 1951

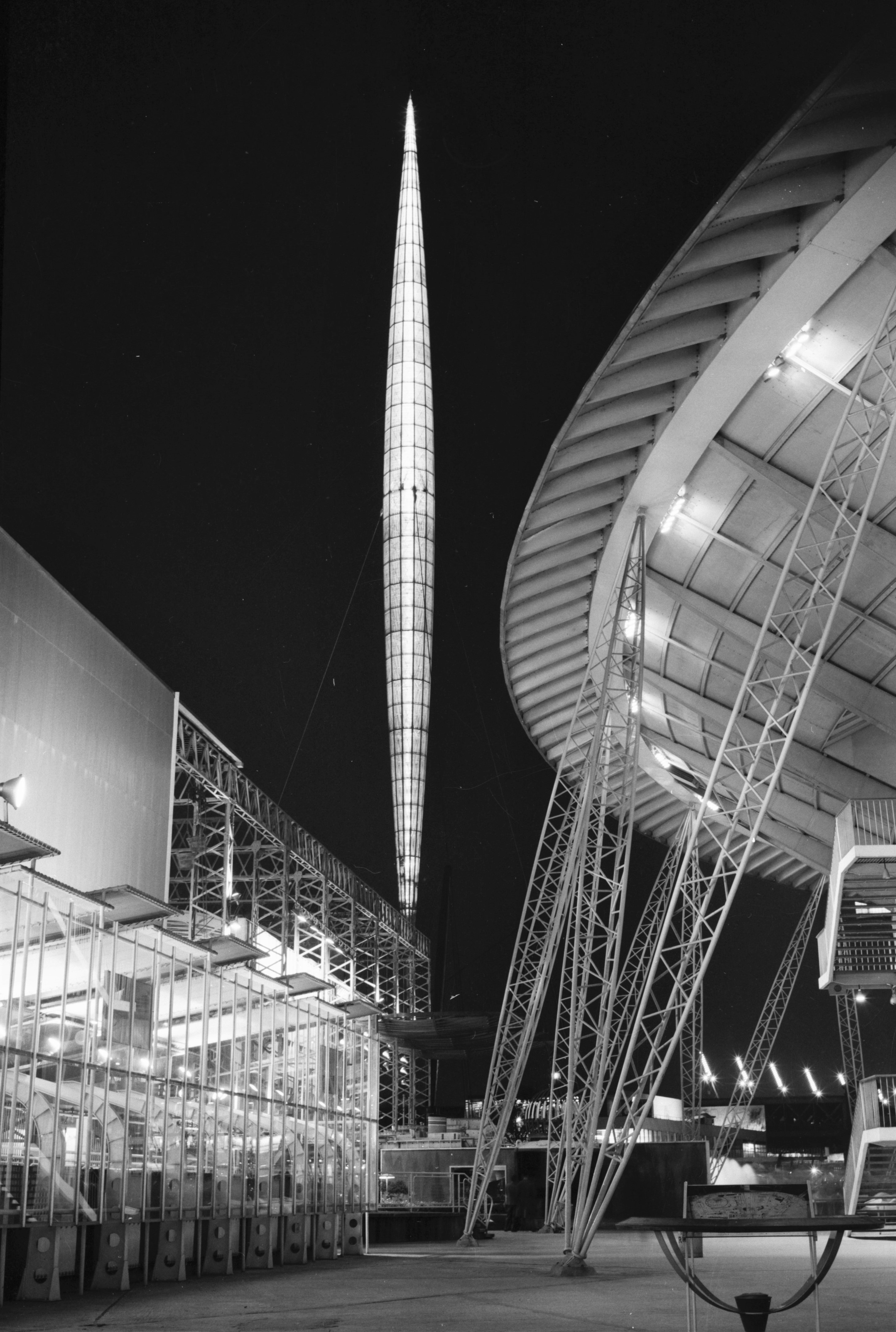
The Skylon illuminated at night

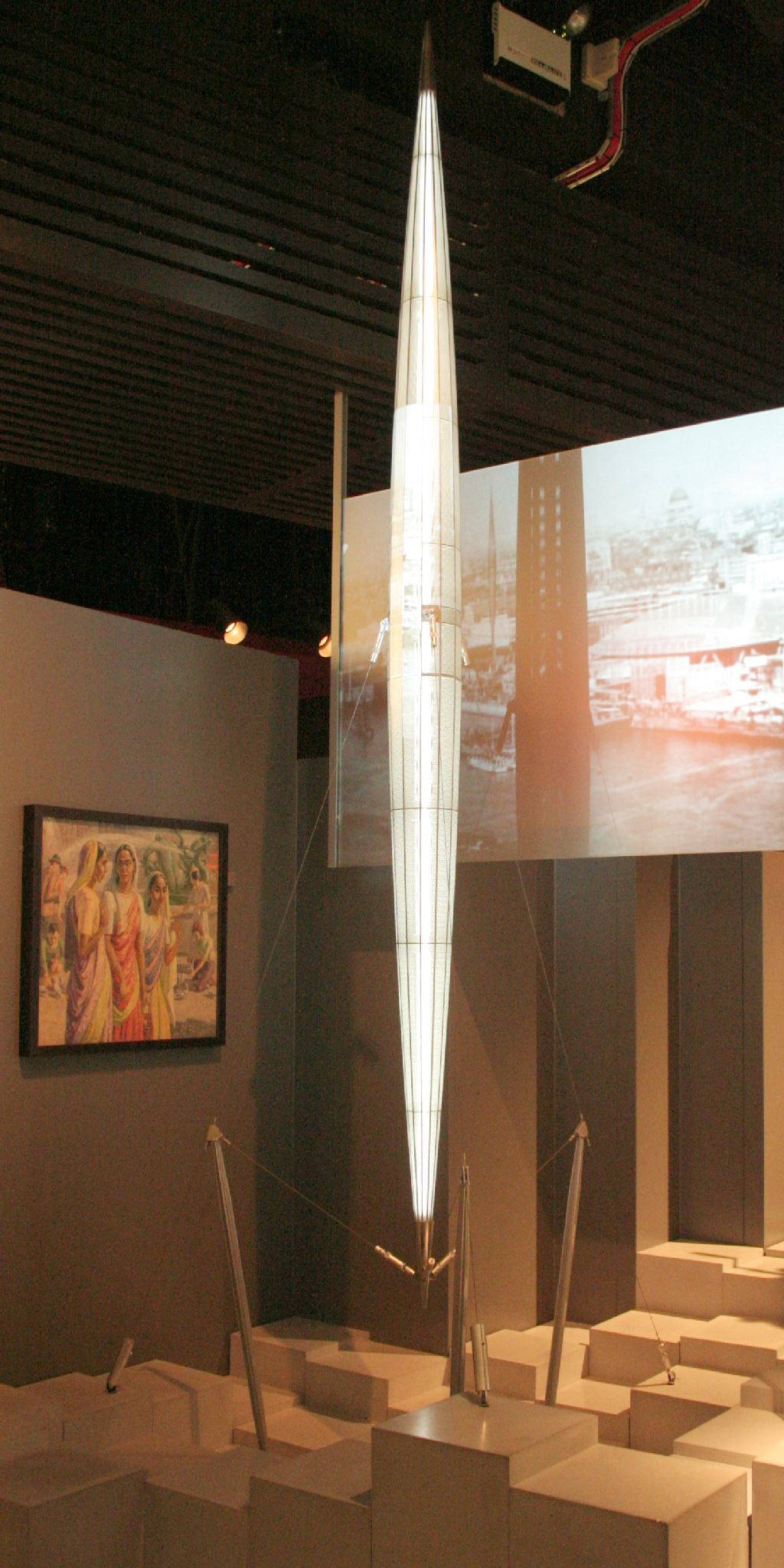
Skylon model at the Museum of London

The Skylon was a futuristic-looking, slender, vertical, cigar-shaped steel tensegrity structure located by the Thames in London, that gave the illusion of floating above the ground, built in 1951 for the Festival of Britain.

A popular joke of the period was that, like the British economy of 1951, "It had no visible means of support".

== Construction ==
The Skylon was the "Vertical Feature" that was an abiding symbol of the Festival of Britain. It was designed by Hidalgo Moya, Philip Powell and Felix Samuely, and fabricated by Painter Brothers of Hereford, England, on London's South Bank between Westminster Bridge and Hungerford Bridge. The Skylon consisted of a steel latticework frame, pointed at both ends and supported on cables slung between three steel beams. The partially constructed Skylon was rigged vertically, then grew taller in situ. The architects' design was made structurally feasible by the engineer Felix Samuely who, at the time, was a lecturer at the Architectural Association School of Architecture in Bedford Square, Bloomsbury. The base was nearly 15 metres (50 feet) from the ground, with the top nearly 90 metres (300 feet) high. The frame was clad in aluminium louvres lit from within at night. Questions were asked in Parliament regarding the danger to visitors from lightning-strikes to the Skylon, and the papers reported that it was duly roped off at one point, in anticipation of a forecast thunderstorm.

=== Name ===
Both the name and form of the Skylon most likely referenced the Trylon feature of the 1939 New York World's Fair. The name was suggested by Mrs A. G. S. Fidler, wife of the chief architect of the Crawley Development Corporation. Moya wrote, "We were unimpressed at first but soon came to accept that, by combining the suggestions of Pylon, Sky and Nylon (a fascinating new material in 1951), it was wonderfully descriptive name which has lasted forty years, considerably longer than the structure itself."

=== Incidents ===
A few days before the King and Queen visited the exhibition in May 1951, Skylon was climbed at midnight by Philip Gurdon, a student at Birkbeck College, who attached a University of London Air Squadron scarf near the top. Police constable Frederick Hicks was sent up to retrieve the scarf the following morning.

== Demolition ==
In spite of its popularity with the public, the £30,000 cost of dismantling and re-erecting the Skylon elsewhere (equivalent to £800,000 as of 2025) was deemed too much for a government struggling with post-war austerity. Skylon was removed in 1952 when the rest of the exhibition was dismantled, on the orders of Winston Churchill, who saw the Festival and its architectural structures as a symbol of the preceding Labour Government's vision of a new socialist Britain.

Speculation as to the Skylon's fate included theories from Jude Kelly, artistic director of the Southbank Centre, that it was thrown into the River Lea in east London, dumped into the Thames, buried under Jubilee Gardens, made into souvenirs or sold as scrap. The base is preserved in the Museum of London and the wind cups are held in a private collection. An investigation was carried out by the Front Row programme on BBC Radio 4 and the result was broadcast on 8 March 2011. It was revealed that the Skylon and the roof of the Dome of Discovery had been sold to George Cohen, Sons and Company scrap metal dealers of Wood Lane, Hammersmith, and dismantled at their works in Bidder Street, Canning Town, on the banks of the River Lea. Some of the metal fragments were then made into a series of commemorative paper-knives and other artefacts. The inscriptions on the paper-knives read "600" (Note: . George Cohen and Sons changed its name to 'The 600 Group' when it moved its head-office to 600 Commercial Road, Stepney, the Wood Lane site having been sold to the BBC.) and "Made from the aluminium alloy roof sheets which covered the Dome of Discovery at the Festival of Britain, South Bank. The Dome, Skylon and 10 other buildings on the site, were dismantled by George Cohen and Sons and Company Ltd during six months of 1952."

The former location of the Skylon is the riverside promenade between the London Eye and Hungerford Bridge, alongside the Jubilee Gardens (the former site of the Dome of Discovery).

== 2007 Skylon restaurant ==
In May 2007 D&D London (formerly Conran Restaurants) opened a new restaurant named Skylon on the third floor of the Royal Festival Hall. This restaurant had previously been named The Peoples Palace.

== See also ==
- Dome of Discovery
- Skylon (spacecraft)
- Blaw-Knox tower
