= Tal-y-Cafn =

Human settlement in Conwy, Wales

Coordinates: 53.228°N 3.817°W

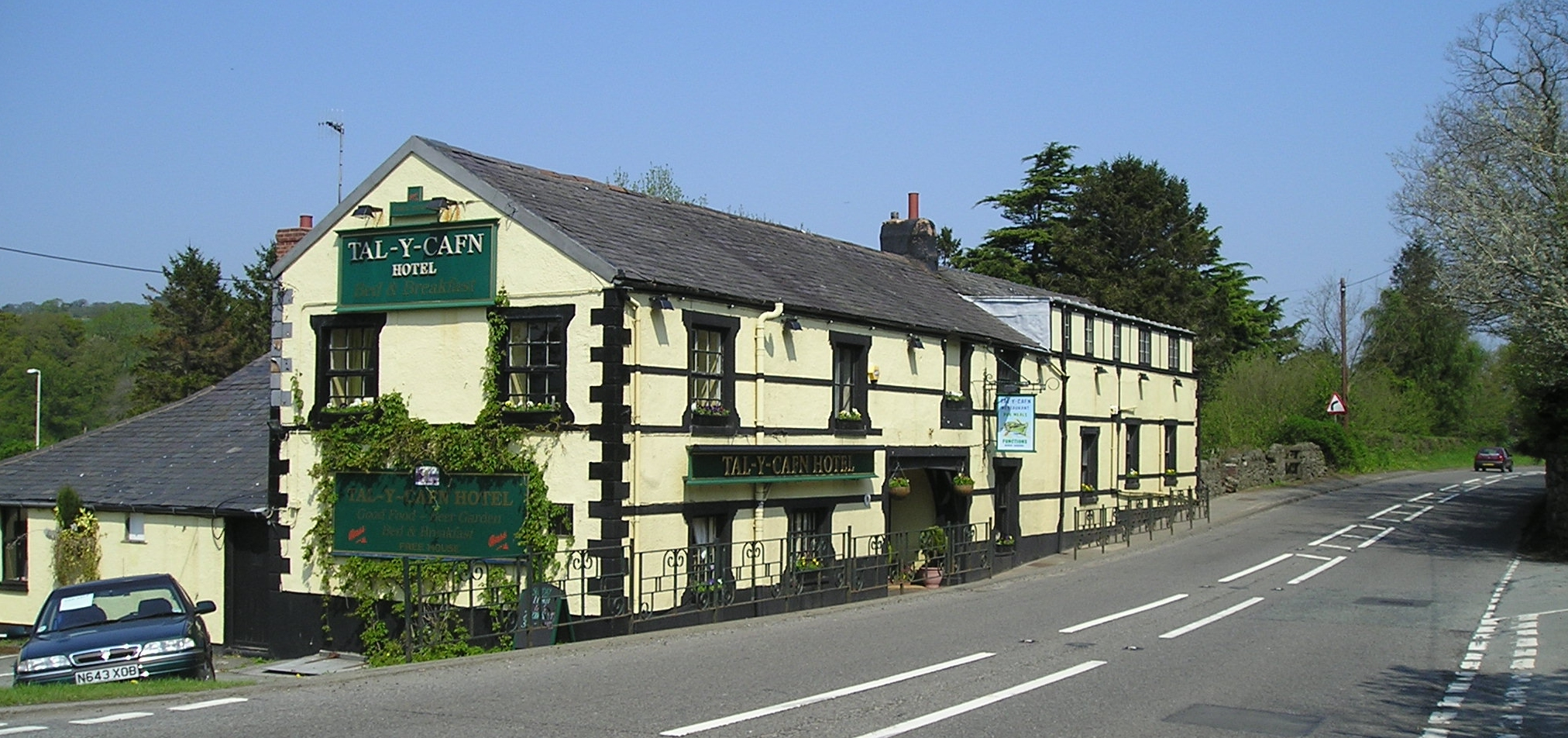
- Tal-y-Cafn Hotel

- Location within Conwy
- OS grid reference: SH787716
- Community: Eglwysbach
- Principal area: Conwy
- Country: Wales
- Sovereign state: United Kingdom
- Post town: COLWYN BAY
- Postcode district: LL28
- Dialling code: 01492 650 016
- Police: North Wales
- Fire: North Wales
- Ambulance: Welsh
- UK Parliament: Bangor Aberconwy
- Senedd Cymru – Welsh Parliament: Aberconwy

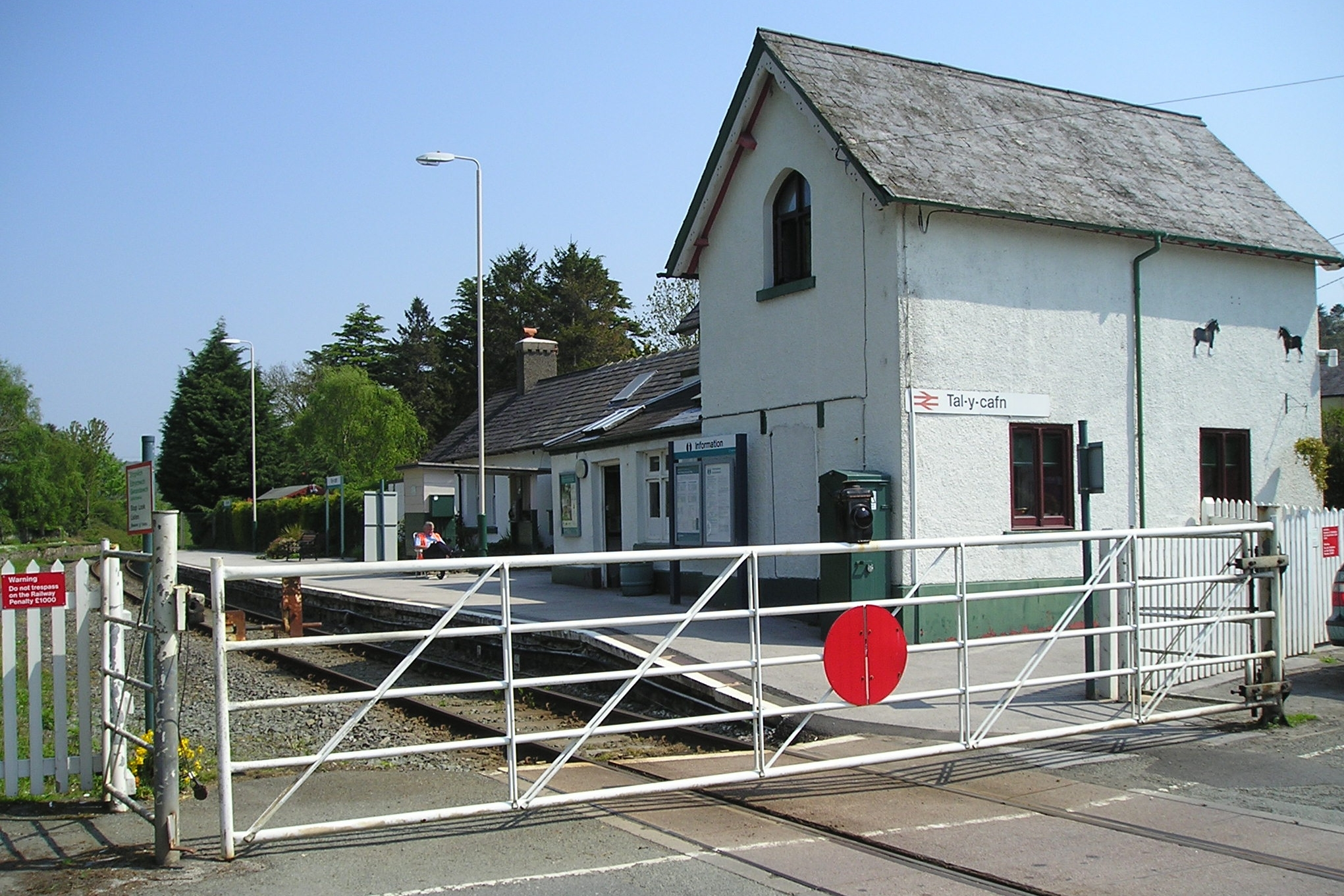
Tal-y-Cafn station

Tal-y-Cafn (Welsh for 'place opposite the ferry-boat') is a small settlement in Conwy county borough, north Wales, in the community of Eglwysbach.

It lies in the Conwy valley close to the Roman settlement of Canovium at Caerhun, and was the site of a Roman river-crossing point of the River Conwy. A medieval ferry, which operated from as early as 1301, was replaced by a steel bridge of rivetted plates and angles on piers of concrete and masonry in 1897. Originally a toll bridge, it is now toll free, and is the only road bridge over the river between Conwy and Llanrwst.

The present bridge dates from 1977 to 1978 following severe rusting of the original structure. The chosen design by A. M. Hamilton is of interest, being a Callender-Hamilton type B10 bridge of unit construction and intended for rapid deployment in civilian and military applications. The pre-fabricated steel sections are hot-dip galvanised for protection against corrosion, and no part is too heavy for two men to carry. The piers of the old bridge were in perfect condition, and it was a stipulation that the footway be available for use at all times during reconstruction. It was therefore decided to adopt an unusual installation method, whereby the new bridge was assembled through and around the old bridge. Once completed, the new bridge was lowered onto the piers by cutting away piece-by-piece the old bridge.

The bridge also carries water in a pipe from Llyn Dulyn and Llyn Melynllyn in the Carneddau mountains to the coastal town of Llandudno.

Tal-y-Cafn is primarily known as the site of the Tal-y-Cafn Hotel, a former coaching inn located on the A470 road, and the adjacent Tal-y-Cafn railway station. A livestock market was situated to the south of the railway level-crossing where there was previously a goods siding and loading dock. Following the livestock movement restrictions brought about by the Foot-and-mouth Disease outbreak of 2001, the market did not re-open. The site is now occupied by a housing development. The shop and post office are also now closed, and demolished. The hotel, which closed in 2010, has been significantly rebuilt and re-opened under the name Tal y Cafn in the summer of 2016.

Nearby lies Bodnant Garden, a National Trust property set in 80 acres (320,000 m^{2}).

A modern housing estate development on the western bank of the river was the location of The Ferry, a former public house. This pub, popular at a time when alcohol could be served on a Sunday (which was not legal across the river), suffered when the Sunday Closing (Wales) Act 1881 was repealed.
