= Shell Centre =

Global headquarters building of Shell plc

Coordinates: 51°30′13.8″N 00°7′0.8″W

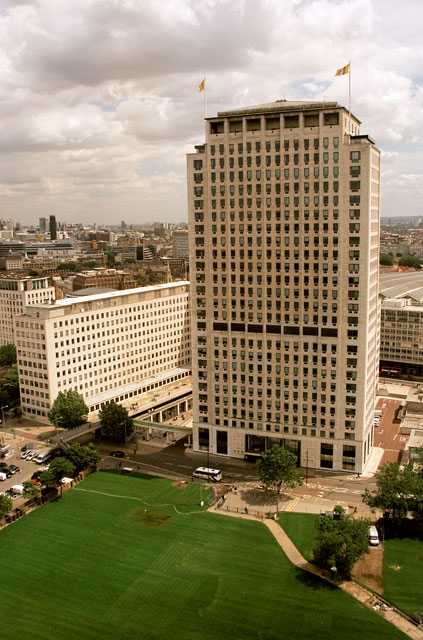
- Shell Centre as seen from the London Eye in 2004

General information
- Location: London, United Kingdom
- Construction started: 1957
- Completed: 1962
- Opened: 1962; 64 years ago
- Owner: Shell plc

Design and construction
- Architects: Sir Howard Robertson; Ralph Maynard Smith
- Architecture firm: Easton & Robertson; Cusdin Preston & Smith
- Main contractor: Sir Robert McAlpine

The Shell Centre in London is the global headquarters of oil major Shell plc. It is located on Belvedere Road in the London Borough of Lambeth. It is a prominent feature on the South Bank of the River Thames near County Hall, and now forms the backdrop to the London Eye.

The original Shell Centre comprised the tower building and three now-demolished adjoining nine-storey wings (collectively formerly known as the "Upstream Building"). The original development also included the "Downstream Building", which had the same nine-storey slab block form but was separated from the Upstream Building by the railway viaduct between Charing Cross and Waterloo East.

Since 2004–05 to 2019–20 (2017–18 has 15 seconds, while 2018–19 has 59 seconds) a 60-second countdown has been projected onto the Shell Centre at 11:59pm every New Year's Eve as part of the Mayor of London's fireworks celebrations centred on the stretch of the Thames in front of the London Eye. After 2019–20, the countdowns are no longer projected on the Shell Centre.

The Downstream Building was disposed of by Shell in the 1990s. It has been heightened by one storey and is now a block of residential apartments known as the Whitehouse Apartments.

== Site history and layout ==
The Shell Centre occupies part of the site cleared for the 1951 Festival of Britain. The areas closer to the River Thames now include Jubilee Gardens and the South Bank Centre. Jubilee Gardens remained undeveloped prior to its laying out as an open space, largely because of a restrictive covenant in favour of Shell that restricts any building on the part of the site directly between the Shell Tower and the River Thames.

The naming of the Shell Centre buildings perpetuated the split of the Festival site into distinct Upstream and Downstream areas, separated by the railway viaduct approach to Hungerford Bridge.

During construction, parts of abandoned works for the Waterloo and Whitehall Railway were discovered. This was a prototype for a proposed pneumatic railway that would have run under the River Thames linking Waterloo and Charing Cross. Digging was started in 1865, but was stopped in 1868, due to financial problems.

Visible in the Thames at low tide just in line with the tower as water turbulence at one point a few feet into the river bed is the outflow point of the Shell Centre's air conditioning system, which sucks in river water from just outside County Hall and sends it via a pipe within a bolt iron tunnel (built exactly like a tube railway tunnel), to a point convergent with the outfall, beyond which both the intake pipe and the outflow pipes continue under the embankment and Jubilee Gardens to the basement of the tower.

From here the water is sent through filters and heat exchangers to provide cooled air in the building. The pipes had to be specially supported on adjustable jacks, during excavation work for the extension of the Jubilee line in 1995, because of settlement during the driving of an access tunnel out from Jubilee Gardens, to the main running lines in York Road via Chicheley Street.

== Architecture and design ==
A plaque in the lobby of Shell Centre

The choice of Portland Stone cladding, and bronze framed individual upright windows were denounced by Modern Movement critics, and the centre's buildings have generally been regarded as dull. However, the extremely traditional cladding has meant that the buildings have weathered better than most of their contemporaries with concrete or aggregate faced façades or curtain wall glazing.

The original interiors were luxuriously appointed, and as well as contributions from a British design team (many of whom had worked on the Festival of Britain), they included work by Ernesto Nathan Rogers who had worked on the Torre Velasca in Milan. Facilities for staff were lavish by the standards of the time, and the basement of the building was designed with a full size swimming pool and a spacious gymnasium.

The basement also originally housed a rifle range, snooker room, a small supermarket for staff and a host of other facilities. Until 1998, there was also a fully equipped theatre (designed by Cecil Beaton) which – unusually for a space dedicated to amateur productions – had full fly tower facilities.

The courtyard of the Upstream Building included two notable sculptures:

- "Torsion Fountain" (also known as The Shell Fountain) by Franta Belsky is a tall bronze column of shell like forms, which once poured water into one another; and
- "Motorcyclist" by Siegfried Charoux – a larger than life figure of a rider astride his machine.

The public realm of the Upstream Building was steadily degraded over the years, with the generous space between the columns of the entrance from York Road enclosed to enlarge the foyers. Textured paving in contrasting colours was installed to assist partially sighted pedestrians navigate the complex steps and ramps of the site, but also served to deter rough sleepers and skateboarders.

== Construction ==
The Shell Centre was constructed by Sir Robert McAlpine between 1957 and 1962, to a design by Sir Howard Robertson, and the tower stands at 107 metres (351 ft) with 27 storeys (26 numbered and a mezzanine level) and extends three storeys below ground. The tower was the first London office tower to exceed the height of the Victoria Tower of the Palace of Westminster.

It replaced the Midland Grand Hotel as the tallest storied building in London, and the Royal Liver Building as the tallest in the United Kingdom. On completion the building also held the record for the largest office building, by floor space, in Europe.

== Functions and occupation of the buildings ==
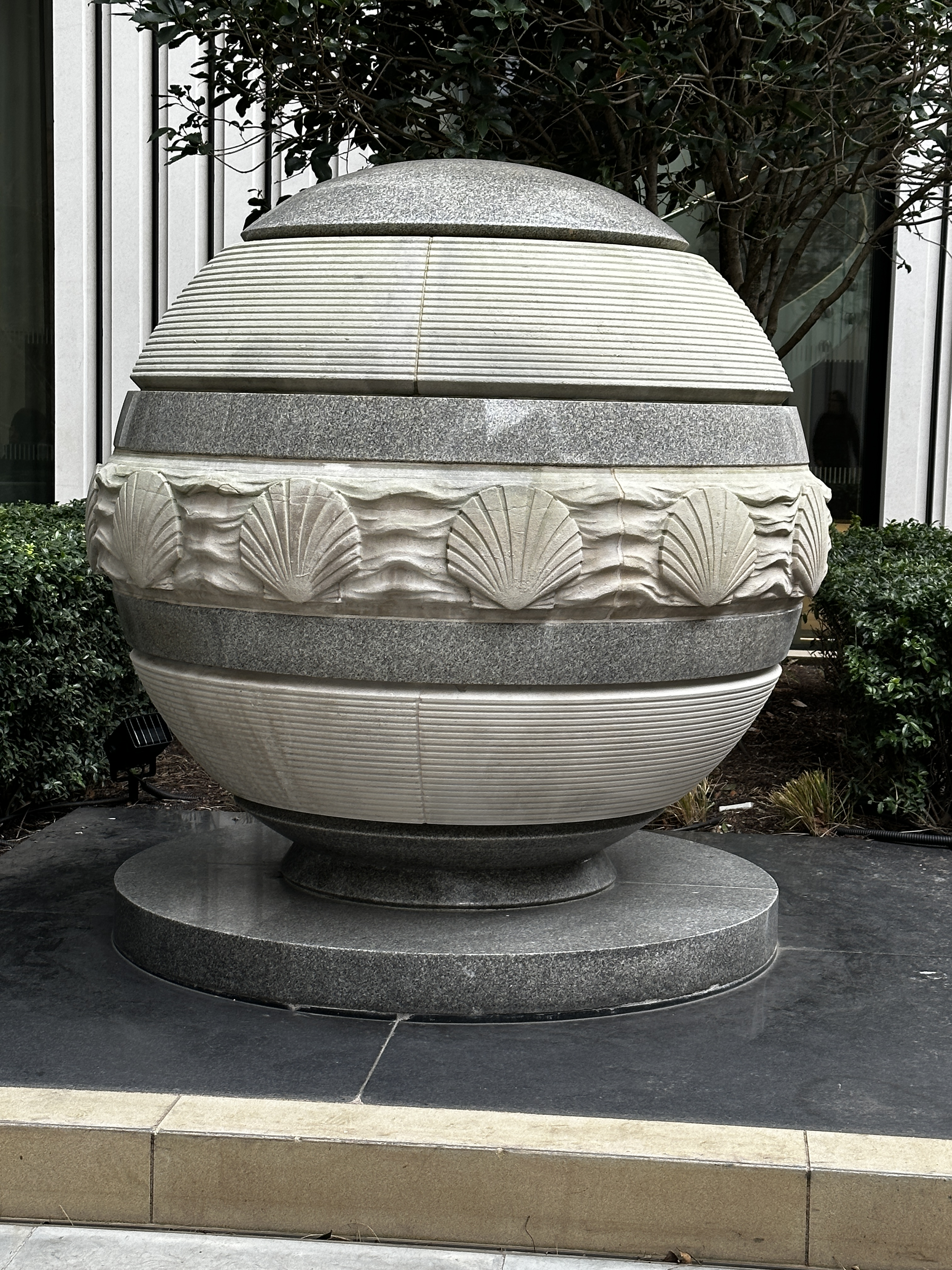
Shells at Southbank Place

In addition to being the headquarters for the group, it also acts as the main offices of the following Shell businesses; refining and marketing, along with a number of functional support activities such as finance and human resources. The Shell Centre is also the head office of Shell's United Kingdom business (Shell UK Ltd.), which was formerly located in Shell Mex House.

== Redevelopment of the Upstream Building ==
In 2004, a planning application was approved to convert the lower floors of the Upstream Building courtyard and the former staff cafeteria into a shopping centre, and to construct a contrasting new glazed office building on the Podium Site to the south, which was then a paved open space above underground car parking.

In July 2011, Shell announced that a joint venture of Canary Wharf Group and Qatari Diar had bought a virtual freehold (a 999-year lease) on the Shell Centre for £300m, and would redevelop the site. The tower was to be left in place, but the rest of the site was replaced by a new scheme of offices, shops and restaurants. The new development is called Southbank Place.

The 9-storey ranges of the Upstream Building have now been replaced by a cluster of new predominantly glazed towers around the original Shell tower. They are considerably taller than the earlier buildings, but are all lower than the Shell Tower.

The staff amenities of the swimming pool and theatre in the basements have not been re-provided in the new development.

The Charoux 'Motorcyclist' sculpture was reinstated on the Chicheley Street side of the development in May 2019 but (as at April 2024) Franta Belsky's 'Shell Fountain' has not yet been re-erected.

== See also ==
- Tall buildings in London

Records
Preceded by Royal Liver Building	Tallest Building in the United Kingdom; 1961–1962; 107 m	Succeeded by CIS Tower
