= Doris Adeney Robertson =

Australian architect

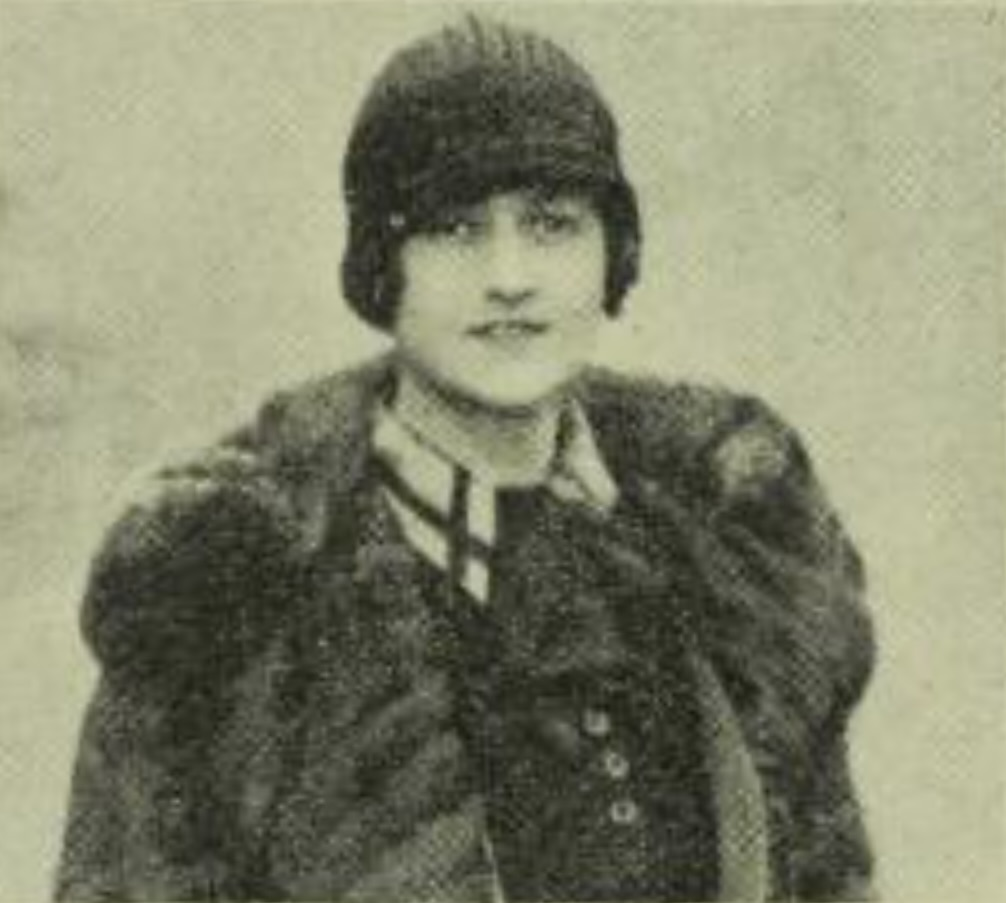
- Lewis in 1926
- Born: Doris Adeney Lewis
- Occupation: Architect
- Spouse: Sir Howard Robertson
- Practice: Easton and Robertson

Doris Adeney Robertson (née Lewis), Lady Robertson (8 March 1899 – 20 May 1981) was an Australian architect, interior designer and writer, and one of the first generation of professionally trained female architects who studied at the Architectural Association (AA) in London.

== Early life and education ==
Lewis was born in Kew, Victoria, Australia, and went to Presbyterian Ladies’ College, Melbourne, for her education until the age of 18. She was apprenticed to the architectural firm of Klingender and Alsop in Melbourne in 1917. She later moved to London and studied at the Architectural Association from 1921 to 1925, when she became an associate of the Royal Institute of British Architects (RIBA). Lewis was a contemporary of other early notable women architects at the AA, including Elisabeth Scott. In 1926 Lewis was awarded the RIBA Alfred Bossom Gold Medal, a travelling scholarship.

== Career in journalism and design ==
In July 1927, Lewis married the Principal of the Architectural Association School, the architect Howard Robertson. Her obituary in The Times in 1981 reported that from this point she decided ‘unilaterally that one architect in the family was enough’. Instead of practising as an architect, from the late 1920s she became a notable writer on architecture and worked as an interior designer, including on commissions undertaken by her husband's practice, Easton and Robertson.

She wrote on design and modern architecture, often under the name 'Doris Howard Robertson', and was responsible for designing a range of modernist interiors, including in London for the Savoy Hotel, the Berkeley Hotel and the ladies’ restaurant at the Bucks Club, Mayfair. She also designed a sitting room and living room in the house of the Marquesa de Casa Maury (Freda Dudley Ward). In 1945 her article on the 'House that Grows' for Ideal Home magazine outlined her vision of the post-war house as a multi-purpose two-storey house with a sun-terrace, air conditioning, and bathrooms on both floors: it could therefore be occupied as a single dwelling or as two flats.

== Later life and death ==
Doris's husband was knighted in 1954 and she became styled as Lady Robertson. They shared a home in Montagu Square, Westminster, London. She continued to live in that house until her death in 1981.
