= Tal-y-Cafn railway station =

Railway station in Conwy, Wales

Tal-y-Cafn Welsh: Tal-y-cafn
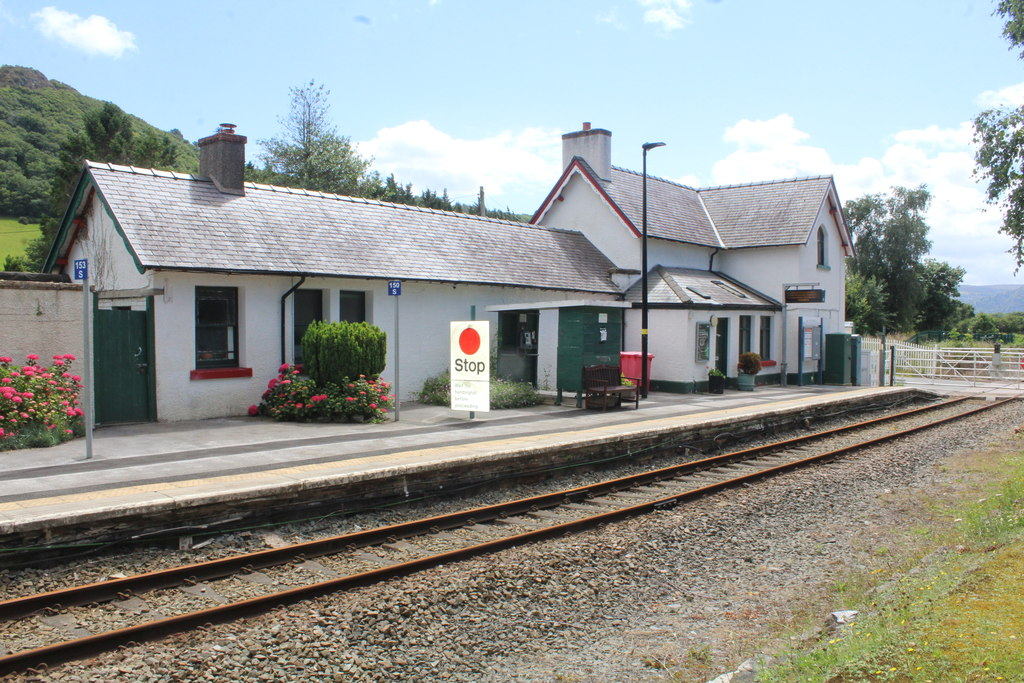
- Tal-y-Cafn station (July 2020)

General information
- Location: Tal-y-Cafn, Conwy; Wales
- Coordinates: 53.228°N 3.818°W
- Grid reference: SH787717
- Manager: Transport for Wales Rail
- Platforms: 1

Other information
- Station code: TLC
- Classification: DfT category F2

Passengers
- 2021/22: ▲1,112
- 2022/23: ▲1,388
- 2023/24: ▲2,608
- 2024/25: ▲2,972
- 2025/26: ▲3,290
Location
Notes
- Passenger statistics from the Office of Rail and Road

Tal-y-Cafn railway station is located at Tal-y-Cafn, Wales, on the Conwy Valley Line from Llandudno Junction to Blaenau Ffestiniog.

== History ==
Until the early 1960s the station had a passing loop and two platforms, was known as Tal-y-Cafn and Eglwysbach and publicised as the station for Bodnant Garden, which is in the parish of Eglwysbach and a lengthy up-hill walk.

The station was renamed from Tal-y-Cafn & Eglwysbach to Tal-y-Cafn on 6 May 1974, although a name board on the disused platform still refers to Eglwysbach.

== Facilities ==
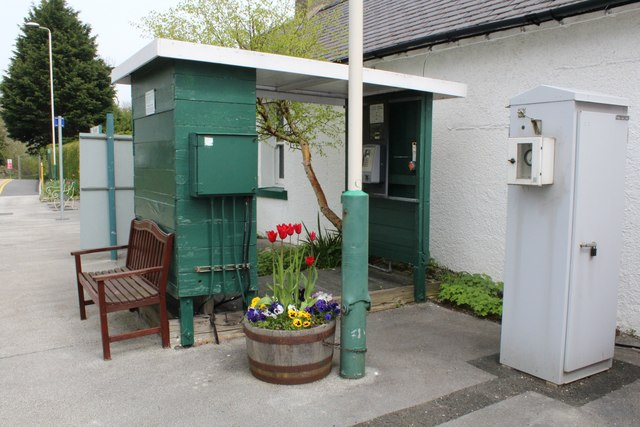
Former signal control area (May 2016)

The station buildings, mostly in private occupation, are well maintained. The Station Master's House is an all year round holiday let, available for booking through railwaystationcottages.co.uk

The station is officially an unstaffed halt (tickets must be purchased on the train or prior to travel), but the level crossing at the south end is still staffed (due to its location next to the river bridge) and retains its manually operated metal gates; the crossing keeper works out of an office in the main building. Up until 1993, the crossing also had protecting signals worked from a ground frame on the platform; these were replaced by stop and fixed distant boards after the gates were run through by a train.

Digital CIS displays, a pay phone and timetable poster boards are provided to offer train running information. The station has step-free access to the platform from the station entrance, but is not wheelchair accessible.

== Services ==
Six trains call in each direction Mon-Sat, with four departures each way on Sundays.

This station is a request stop only for trains running northbound towards Llandudno. Trains running southbound towards Blaenau Ffestiniog are required to stop here so that the crossing keeper can open the manual level crossing gates south of the station.

Following serious flood damage to the line in multiple locations caused by Storm Gareth in March 2019, services were suspended and replaced by buses until repair work was carried out. The line reopened in July 2019 after completion of the remedial works. Further storm damage to the line in the area (this time from Storm Ciara) in February 2020 with services again being suspended until the line was reopened on 28 September 2020.

Preceding station	National Rail	Following station
Glan Conwy	Transport for Wales Rail; Conwy Valley Line	Dolgarrog
