= Dome of Discovery =

Exhibition building in London

Coordinates: 51.5037°N 0.1183°W

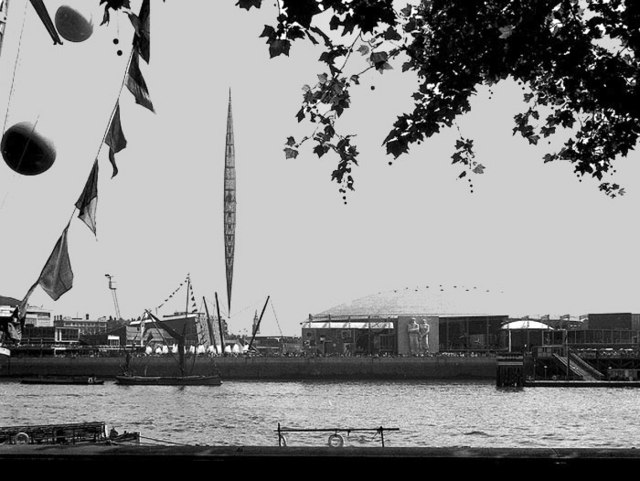
Skylon and the Dome of Discovery

The Dome of Discovery was a temporary exhibition building designed by architect Ralph Tubbs for the Festival of Britain celebrations which took place on London's South Bank in 1951, alongside the River Thames. The consulting engineers were Freeman Fox & Partners, in particular Oleg Kerensky and Gilbert Roberts.

Like the adjacent Skylon, the dome became an iconic structure for the public and helped popularise modern design and architectural style in a Britain still suffering through post-war austerity. As twin icons, the forms of the Skylon and Dome of Discovery were related to those of the Trylon and Perisphere of the 1939 New York World's Fair. Controversially, after the Festival closed, the dome was demolished and its materials sold as scrap. The site was cleared for reuse, and is now the location of the Jubilee Gardens, near the London Eye.

== The building ==
The dome had a diameter of 365 feet (111 m) and stood 93 feet (28 m) tall, making it at the time the largest dome in the world. It had a long escalator as its dramatic entrance, with the dome itself made out of aluminium. Construction was contracted to Horseley Ironworks of Tipton, with fabrication partly sub-contracted to Structural and Mechanical Development Engineers Ltd of Slough. It was erected by Horseley on a site designed and prepared by Costain Group from concrete and aluminium in a modernist style and housed many of the festival attractions. Internally the dome included a number of galleries on various levels housing exhibitions on the theme of discovery.

== The exhibition ==
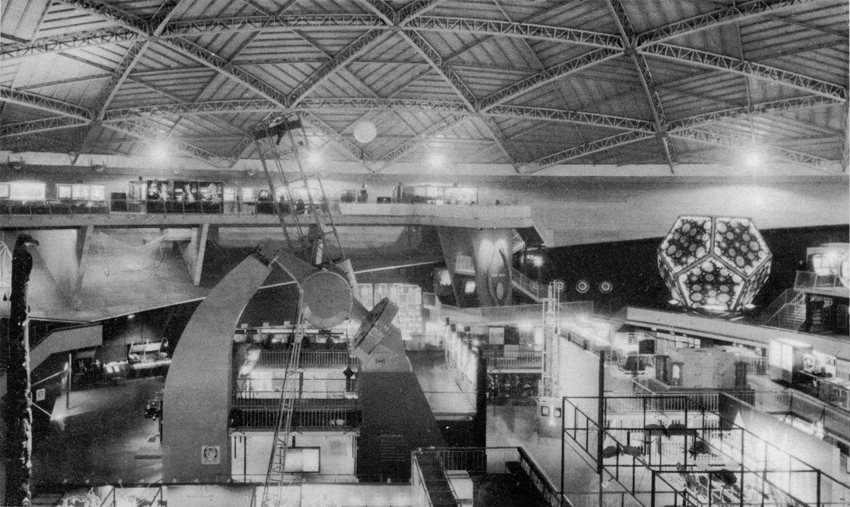
Interior of the dome

The theme of the exhibition in the Dome of Discovery was "British initiative in exploration and discovery is as strong as it ever was."

The exhibition was divided into the following sections:

- The Land
- The Earth
- Polar
- Sea
- Sky
- Outer Space
- The Physical World
- The Living World

Keith Vaughan was commissioned to paint a 50-foot mural on the theme of discovery. No photographic record of this mural exists, although a sketch was included in Sotheby's 21–22 November 2017 sale.

== Demolition ==
In response to a public statement by Jude Kelly about the destiny of the Skylon, an investigation was launched by the Front Row programme on BBC Radio 4. The result was broadcast on 8 March 2011, revealing that the Skylon and the roof of the Dome of Discovery were sold for scrap to George Cohen and Sons, scrap metal dealers of Wood Lane, White City, and dismantled at their works in Bidder Street, Canning Town, on the banks of the River Lea. Some of the metal fragments were then turned into a series of commemorative paper-knives and artefacts. The inscriptions on the paper-knife read "600" (Note: George Cohen and Sons changed its name to "The 600 Group" when it moved its head-office to 600 Commercial road, Tower Hamlets, having sold the Wood Lane site to the BBC.) and "Made from the aluminium alloy roof sheets which covered the Dome of Discovery at the Festival of Britain, South Bank. The Dome, Skylon and 10 other buildings on the site, were dismantled by George Cohen and Sons and Company LTD during 6 months of 1952."

== See also ==
- Skylon (Festival of Britain)
- Millennium Dome
