= Browett, Lindley & Co =

British engineering company

Browett, Lindley & Co was a British engineering company established in 1886, which manufactured stationary steam engines used to power cotton mills and early power stations.

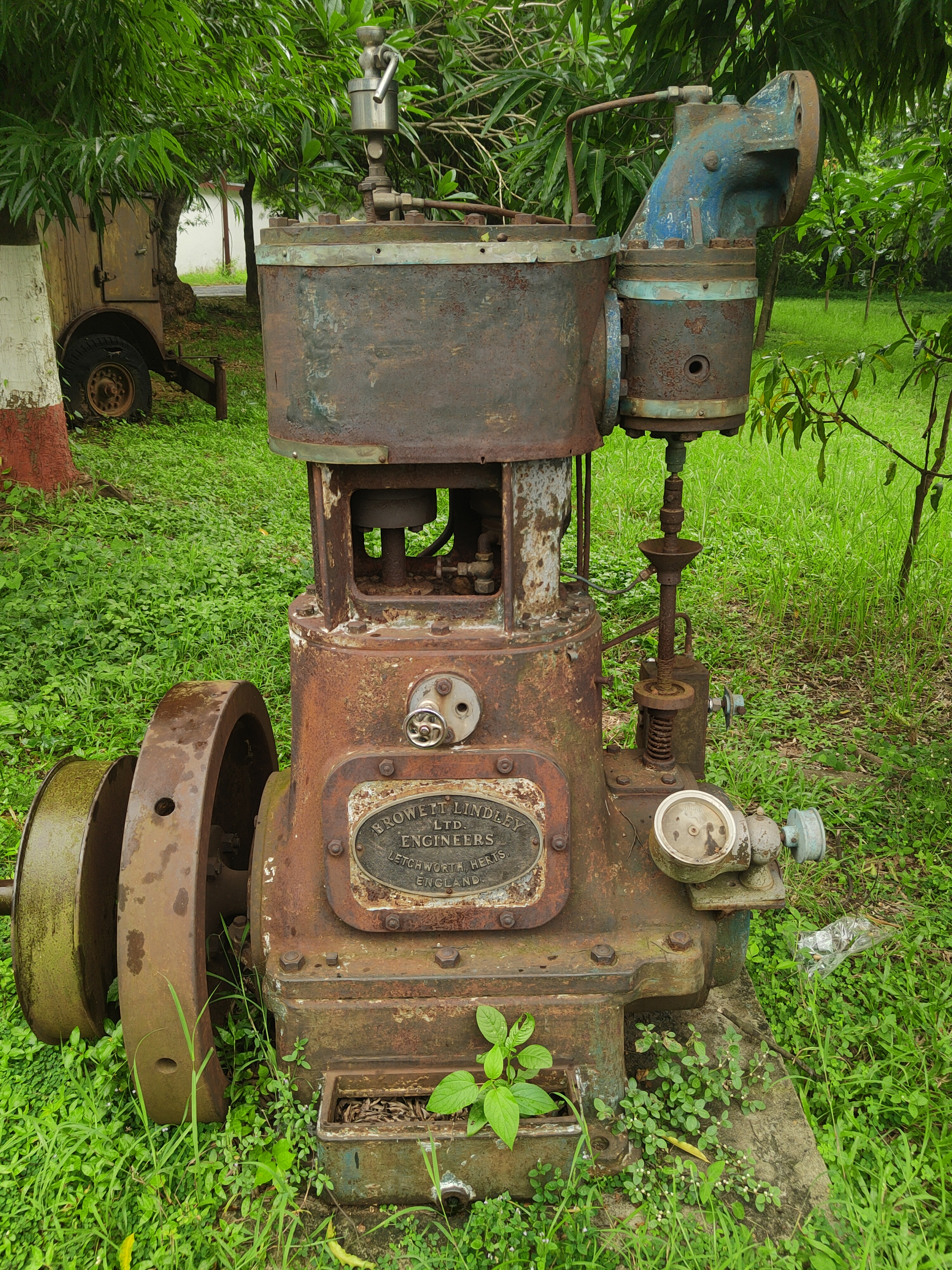
Steam engine manufactured by the British engineering company Browett, Lindley & Co

The company built the Sandon Engine Works, Clifford Street, Patricroft in 1890. The works was later extended in 1901 by the addition of a new erecting shop and boilerhouse.

In 1902, the company supplied eight large triple expansion steam engines, driving 775 kW Mather & Platt dynamos, to Salford Corporation for its Frederick Road generating station.

The company built engines for several Lancashire cotton mills including Alder Mill, Leigh, and Fernhurst Mill, Chadderton.

The Sandon Engine Works closed in 1921.

In 1931, the company was bought by George Cohen, Sons and Company.
