= A. M. Hamilton =

New Zealand civil engineer

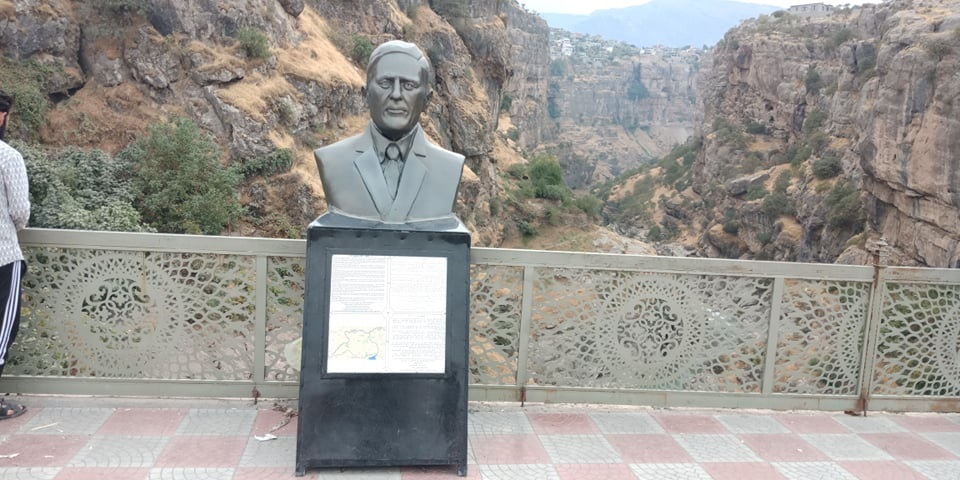
A Hamilton statue in Rawandiz

Archibald Milne Hamilton (1898–1972) was a New Zealand civil engineer, notable for building the Hamilton Road through Kurdistan and designing the Callender-Hamilton bridge system, and the Callendar-Hamilton aeroplane shed of the late 1930s.

== Early life, marriage and children ==
Hamilton was born in Waimate, New Zealand, the son of W.M. and J.S. Hamilton, on 18 November 1898. He was educated at Waitaki Boys' High School. In 1924 he graduated from Canterbury College with a Bachelor of Engineering (Civil) degree.

Hamilton married Bettina Matraves Collier, a medical doctor, in 1934, and they had seven children. The second eldest of these was the evolutionary biologist W. D. Hamilton. Two of their daughters became doctors: Janet was a general practitioner and Mary R. Bliss achieved some notability for designing mattresses to prevent bedsores in geriatric patients. Another daughter Margaret became a pasture scientist and son Robert an engineer.

== Early career ==
Hamilton worked for the Lyttelton Harbour Board in New Zealand where he designed a wave model for planning port improvements. Next, he worked at the Admiralty, London, designing the Singapore Naval Base.

== Hamilton Road ==
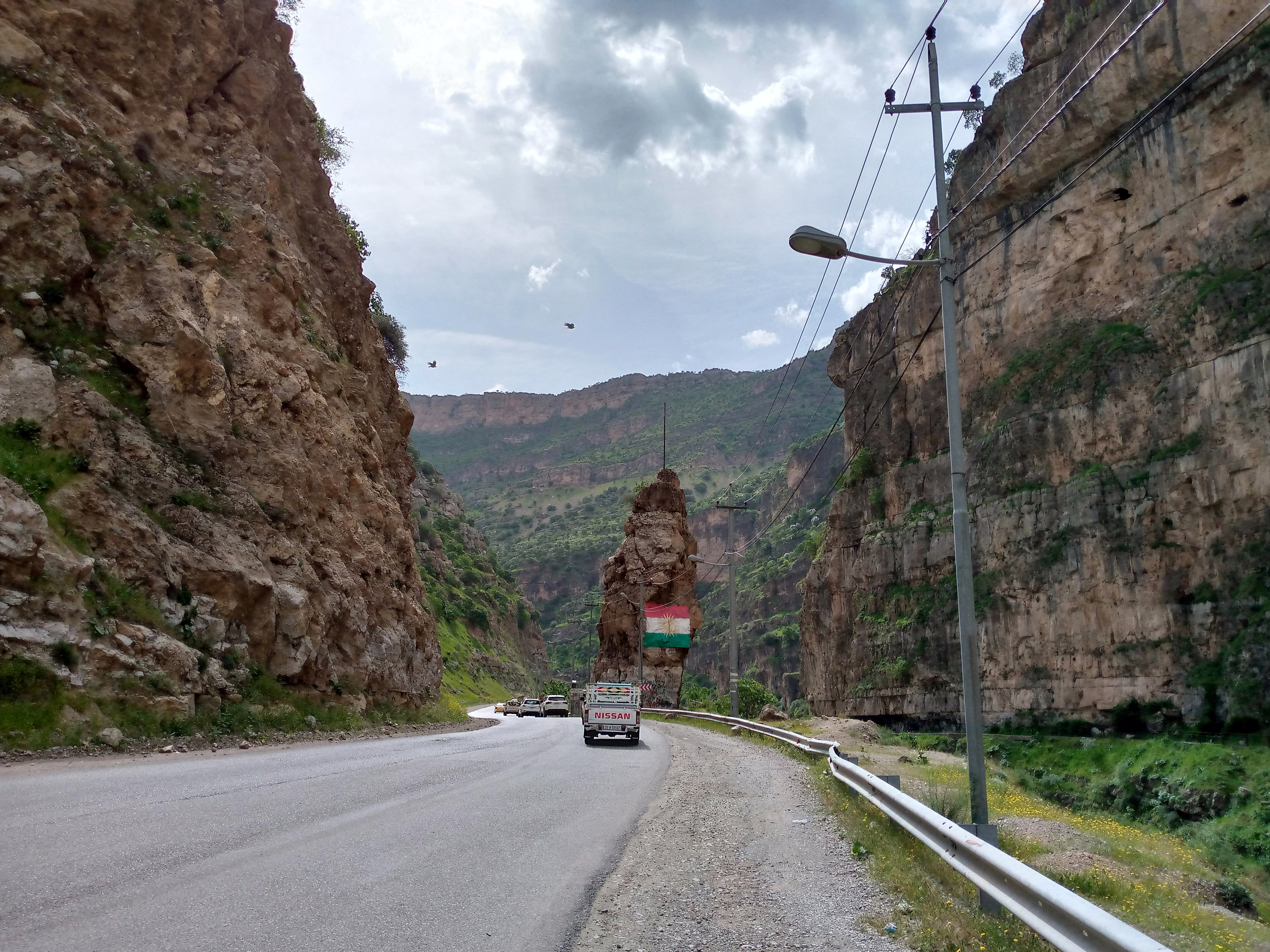
Hamilton Road near Geli Ali Beg Waterfall in Erbil

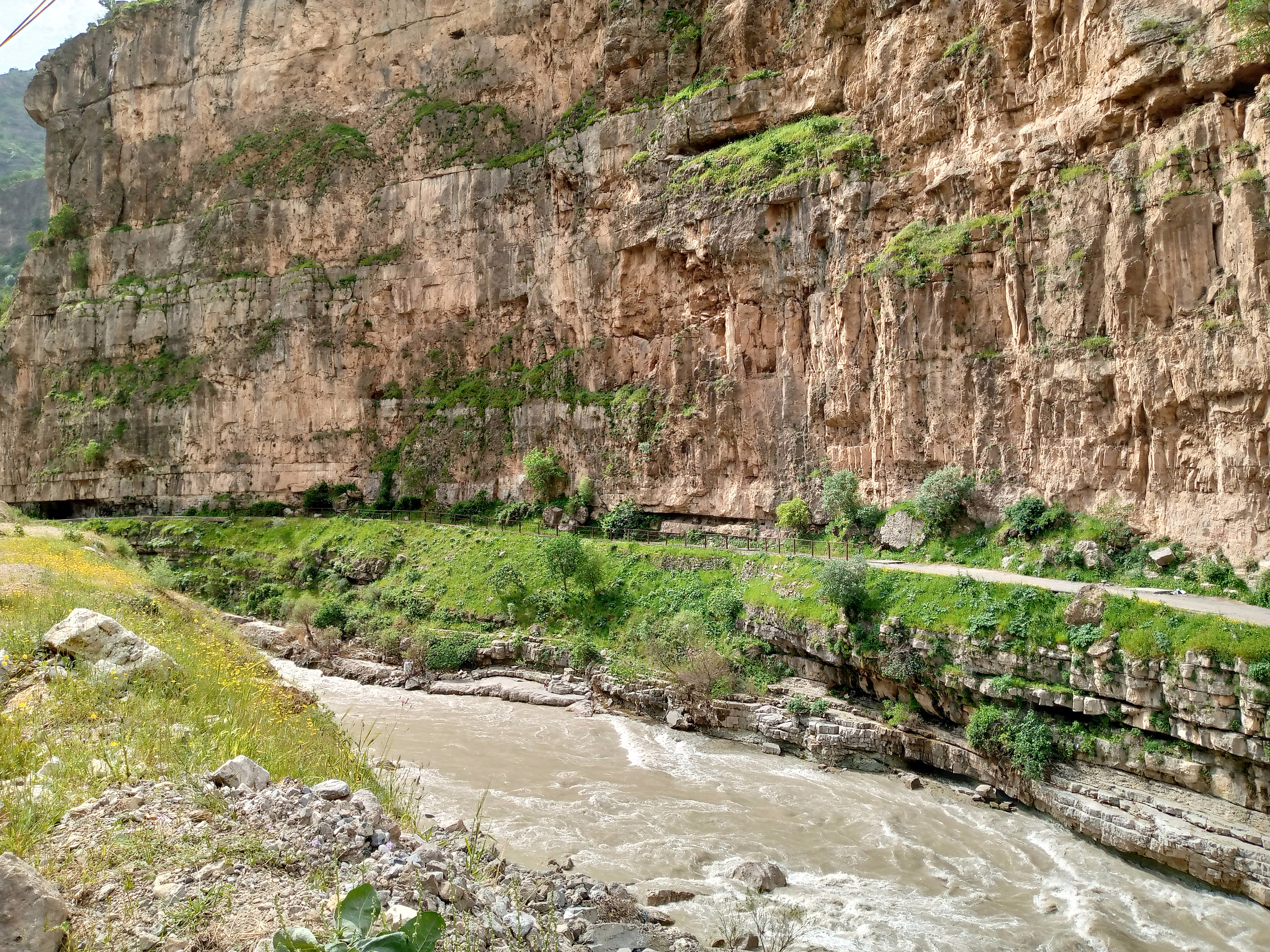

Between 1928 and 1932 Hamilton was the principal engineer of a British-built strategic road across Southern Kurdistan, which ran from Erbil, through Rawandiz, to the Iranian border near modern-day Piranshahr. The road became known as the Hamilton Road. Although Hamilton hoped the road would unite the peoples of the region, it has been fought over many times. He described the building of the road in a 1937 book entitled Road through Kurdistan.

== Callender-Hamilton Bridge ==
During the construction of the road, Hamilton became aware of the need for strong, adaptable bridges with components that could easily be transported and erected in remote and/or difficult terrain. With British Insulated Callenders Cables, now Balfour Beatty Power Networks Ltd, he designed the Callender-Hamilton bridge system, the income from which helped support his family. The parts of the bridge were bolted together like a Meccano set, and it was popular with the British Army away from the battle front. The failure of the First World War Inglis bridge led to the development of the Bailey bridge. Hamilton successfully claimed to the Royal Commission on Awards to Inventors that the Bailey bridge had breached his patent. Because the Bailey bridge used a pin joining system similar to that used in the Martel Bridge designed by Lieutenant-General Sir Giffard Le Quesne Martel, Hamilton told the commission the Bailey bridge should be called a 'Martel Mk2'.

In 1936 the British War Office paid Hamilton £4,000 for the free non-civil use of his Unit Construction Bridge. In 1954 the Commission awarded him £10,000 in respect of the bridges used in South East Asia Command during WW2 in India. In 1955 Hamilton told the Commission that Martel deserved more than the £12,000 that Bailey had received. Martel was awarded £500..

== Callendar-Hamilton Aeroplane Shed ==
BICC also designed an interesting type of transportable aeroplane hangar in the late 1930s for military use. Although not ordered in quantity by the Air Ministry, a number of these Callendar-Hamilton hangars were built in Britain in the late 1930s and early years of World War II. These are easily recognisable from the more numerous contemporary Bellman and T-type hangars by their intricate internal framework and external overhead door rails. Preserved examples – now listed – of these hangars can be seen today at the Museum of Flight at East Fortune near Edinburgh.

== Bibliography ==
- Francis, Paul (1996). British Military Airfield Architecture – From Airships to the Jet Age Patrick Stephens Ltd, Sparkford, Somerset, ISBN 1-85260-462-X.
- Hamilton, A.M. (1937). Road through Kurdistan: The Narrative of an Engineer in Iraq. Faber, London
  - New Edition (1958). Faber, London.
  - (2004) reprint ISBN 1-85043-637-1
- Joiner, J. H. (1990). One More River to Cross: The Story of British Military Bridging. Pen & Sword Books Limited. ISBN 9781473816916.
