= Callender-Hamilton bridge =

Modular prefabricated bridge system

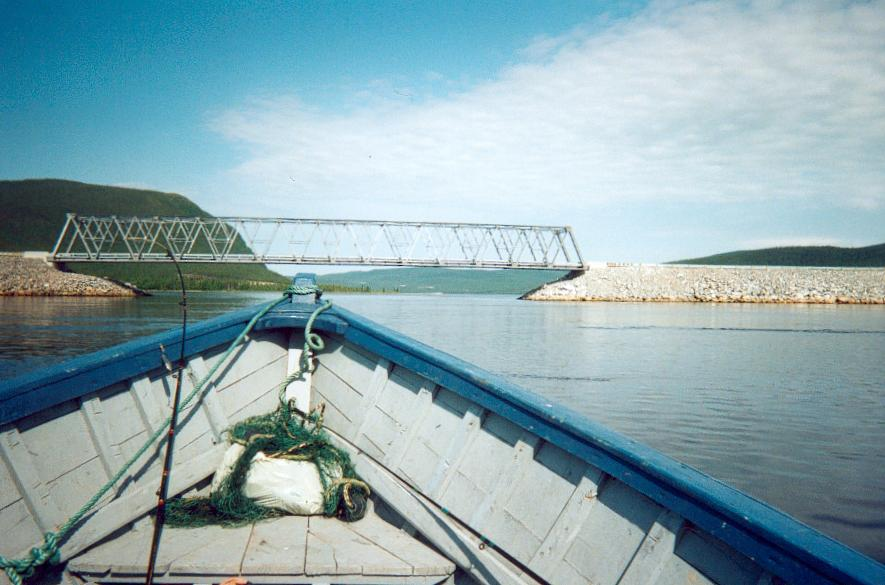
The Alexis River Bridge, Labrador is a Callender-Hamilton type bridge

The Callender-Hamilton bridge is a modular portable pre-fabricated truss bridge, with British patent numbers 423926 and 423996, and US Patent No. 2,024,001. It is primarily designed for use as permanent civil bridging as well as for emergency bridge replacement and for construction by military engineering units. Assembling a Callender-Hamilton bridge takes much longer than the more familiar Bailey bridge as it is made up of individual lengths of galvanised steel bolted together with galvanised high-strength steel bolts, all of which require torque settings. It is stronger and simpler in design concept than the Bailey bridge.

== History ==
The Callender-Hamilton bridge system was designed by New Zealand civil engineer A. M. Hamilton, and patented by him in 1935. The system is currently fabricated by Painter Brothers, Hereford, operating within the Balfour Beatty Power Networks Division formerly British Insulated Callender's Cables.

Hamilton's bridge concept was inspired by his work between 1928 and 1932 as principal engineer on the 'Hamilton Road' through Iraqi Kurdistan. He described the building of this road in his book Road Through Kurdistan: Travels in Northern Iraq, 1937. Hamilton became aware of the need for strong, adaptable bridges made from simple components that could easily be transported and erected in remote locations or on difficult terrain. An original photograph of the exemplar during construction lies here.

Hamilton was awarded £4,000 in 1936 by the War Office for the use of his early bridges and the Royal Commission on Awards to Inventors awarded him £10,000 in 1954 for the partial breach of his patent by the design of the Bailey bridge.

== Design ==
The Callender-Hamilton bridge system is a prefabricated Panel/Floor Beam/Deck system designed to span bridging lengths ranging from 30 to 150 metres with road widths of one to three or more lanes. The design uses Warren trusses and is centred on a series of gusset plates that allow the direct attachment of the longitudinal, diagonal, vertical, and cross framing members. Centralised connection points increase the speed of construction and allow identical panels to be fabricated from identical members and then installed on site. An important feature is that all connections are bolted, so removing the need for onsite welding.

The bridge is usually built on falsework. A reinforced concrete deck is then superimposed on, and acts compositely with, the fabricated steel truss deck, thereby eliminating the use of scaffolding. A steel orthotropic deck, steel open grate deck or a timber deck are alternatives to a concrete deck. As with the Bailey bridge, an enhanced feature of the Callender-Hamilton bridge is that it can be assembled entirely on one side of a gap and with a removable launching nose added then be projected on rollers to the other side.

All bridge elements are small enough to be transported by road and site operations can be carried out without skilled labour, special plant or heavy equipment. Because of the modular design, repairs are as structurally efficient as the original construction and at the end of service dismantled bridges can be reduced to initial components for reuse. Salvability is high due to the hot-dip galvanisation of each individual component.

== Examples of Callender-Hamilton bridges in use ==
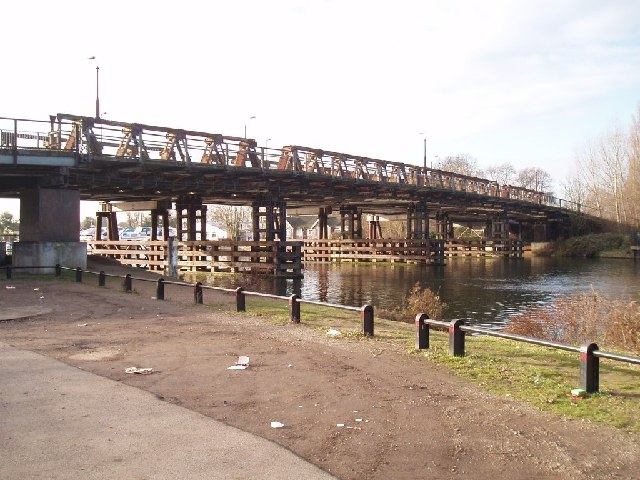
The fourth Walton bridge, an example of a Callender-Hamilton bridge

- Bridge No 194 in KZJ-BPQ Section, South Central Railway, India
- Caparmesnil near St-Pierre-sur-Dives, Normandy
- Cleenish Island Road County Fermanagh, Northern Ireland
- Grand Falls – Province of Newfoundland and Labrador
- Heusdensch Canal Netherlands
- Ehzerbrug, Twente canal, Almen Netherlands
- Langwathby Bridge, Cumbria
- St. Lewis and Alexis Rivers, Province of Newfoundland and Labrador
- Tal-y-Cafn type B10 bridge over the River Conwy
- Two Fords Bridge Lydlinch, Dorset
- Two Lane Bridge at St. Paul's Bay – Province of Newfoundland and Labrador
- Vernon, Eure, Normandy, between 1945 and 1955.
- The fourth Walton Bridge
- Pont du Mandrare, Anosy, Madagascar between 1958 and 2012.
- Kearsley pipe bridge, River Irwell, Kearsley, Bolton (washed away in floods February 2020)
- Axminster, Somerset – A temporary Callender-Hamilton bridge has been constructed over the River Axe adjacent to the M5 to facilitate construction works for the Hinkley C Nuclear Power Station power grid connection
- Hauraki Rail Trail Cycleway - Karangahake Gorge, New Zealand. Two 30m span bridges with timber structures for pedestrian and cycleway use.

== See also ==
- Bailey bridge - developed in 1940–1941 by the British for military use during the Second World War.
- Mabey Logistic Support Bridge – the modern day Bailey Bridge used by NATO countries.
- Medium Girder Bridge – a modern functional equivalent of the Bailey bridge.
- Military engineer
- Pontoon bridge – for another bridge type with mobile military application.
