= Tal-y-bont, Conwy =

Village in Conwy County Borough, Wales

Coordinates: 53.202°N 3.847°W

Tal-y-Bont
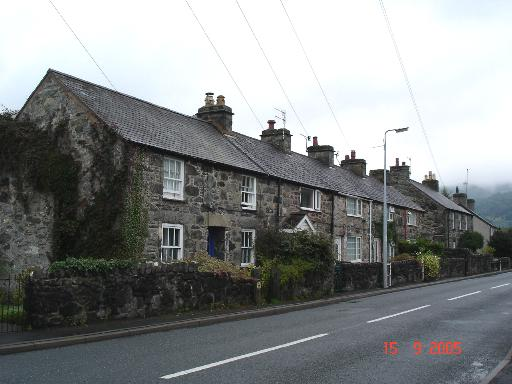
- Tal-y-Bont

- Location within Conwy
- OS grid reference: SH766688
- Community: Caerhun
- Principal area: Conwy
- Country: Wales
- Sovereign state: United Kingdom
- Post town: CONWY
- Postcode district: LL32
- Dialling code: 01492
- Police: North Wales
- Fire: North Wales
- Ambulance: Welsh
- UK Parliament: Bangor Aberconwy
- Senedd Cymru – Welsh Parliament: Aberconwy

Tal-y-Bont is a small village in Conwy County Borough, Wales and lies in the Conwy Valley, west of the River Conwy, on the B5106 road, 6 mi (9.7 km) from the town of Conwy to the north, and six miles from Llanrwst to the south, and in the community of Caerhun. It lies adjacent to the village of Dolgarrog to the south, and below the small settlement of Llanbedr-y-Cennin to the west. The population is around 400.

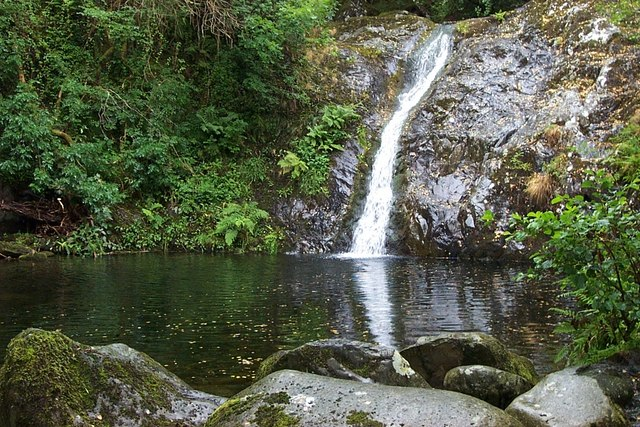
A waterfall on the Dulyn near Tal-y-Bont

The 'Bont' (the mutated form of pont, Welsh for "bridge") in the name probably refers to the bridge over the Afon Dulyn, a tributary of the nearby River Conwy, which runs through the village.

The village is served by buses and the nearby Dolgarrog railway station.

Castell, the oldest section of Tal-y-Bont, has a bar/restaurant and a 5-acre garden centre. The village also has a shop and post office and a café, formerly Y Bedol Pub.

== Access to Snowdonia and the Carneddau ==
Tal-y-Bont is the starting point for the road to Llyn Eigiau and the southern Carneddau mountains. Access to the northern end of the Carneddau Range and the Roman road over to Aberystwyth can also be achieved by following the road up from Tal-y-Bont through Llanbedr-y-Cennin - which is on the eastern edge of the Snowdonia National Park - and taking a left fork at the pub, Ye Olde Bull Inn, in Llanbedr.

Walkers can access peaks in the northern end of the Carneddau Range, such as Drum and Foel-fras, and then continue south east to reach Carnedd Llewelyn.

== Historical interest ==
=== Bronze Age fort ===
To the west is a hill named Pen-y-Gaer, on top of which can be found remains of a Bronze Age hillfort. The hill occupies a commanding position above the village, with views north down the valley to the town of Conwy and Llandudno, and south to Llanrwst. Pen-y-Gaer can be reached by following the road that runs up through Llanbedr-y-Cennin, taking the left fork at the Olde Bull Inn and then taking a left several miles later when the hill appears directly above to the left.

=== Roman fort ===
Half a mile to the north of Tal-y-Bont is the hamlet of Caerhun, where the Roman fort of Canovium (c. 75 AD) is located.

=== Artists' colony ===
The latter 19th century saw a number of artists living in Tal-y-Bont and neighbouring Llanbedr-y-Cennin. The art movement, which had started in Betws-y-Coed in the 1850s, saw a movement down the valley after the arrival of the railway in Betws-y-Coed. Initial settlement was in Trefriw, and the 1871 census listed the first artist settler in Tal-y-Bont/Llanbedr as J.Cole. There were 7 artists living here by the 1881 census, and 15 by 1891.

Charles Potter, an artist from Oldham, was instrumental in setting up the Tal-y-Bont Artists Club, and in raising funds to construct in 1886 the Artists Club building at Tal-y-Bont (actually Llandbedr-y-Cennin), and he became its first president. The group had originally starting meeting informally at the Olde Bull Inn in 1883, then in 1884 used the upper floor of a stable building (above a carpenter's workshop, and now demolished) as their first studio.

Named “Walden”, the building offered a studio, a gallery, a classroom, a billiard room, and entertainment space. It originally had 40 members, male artists who lived or worked locally, although there were 150 honorary members. It had a committee of 17 members. The building was also used to hold art courses for clubs from far-and-wide, and every autumn there was an exhibition, despite the fact that this was not an altogether accessible place to the average picture-buying tourist. Membership (including non-resident members) grew to a number approaching 150.

The artist colony was a strong influence on the formation of the Royal Cambrian Academy of Art, which moved into Plas Mawr, Conwy in 1886.

The colony came to an end at the onset of World War I, and in the 1920s the building became a private home.
