= St Mary's Church, Caerhun =

Church in Conwy County Borough, Wales

Coordinates: 53.2165°N 3.8333°W

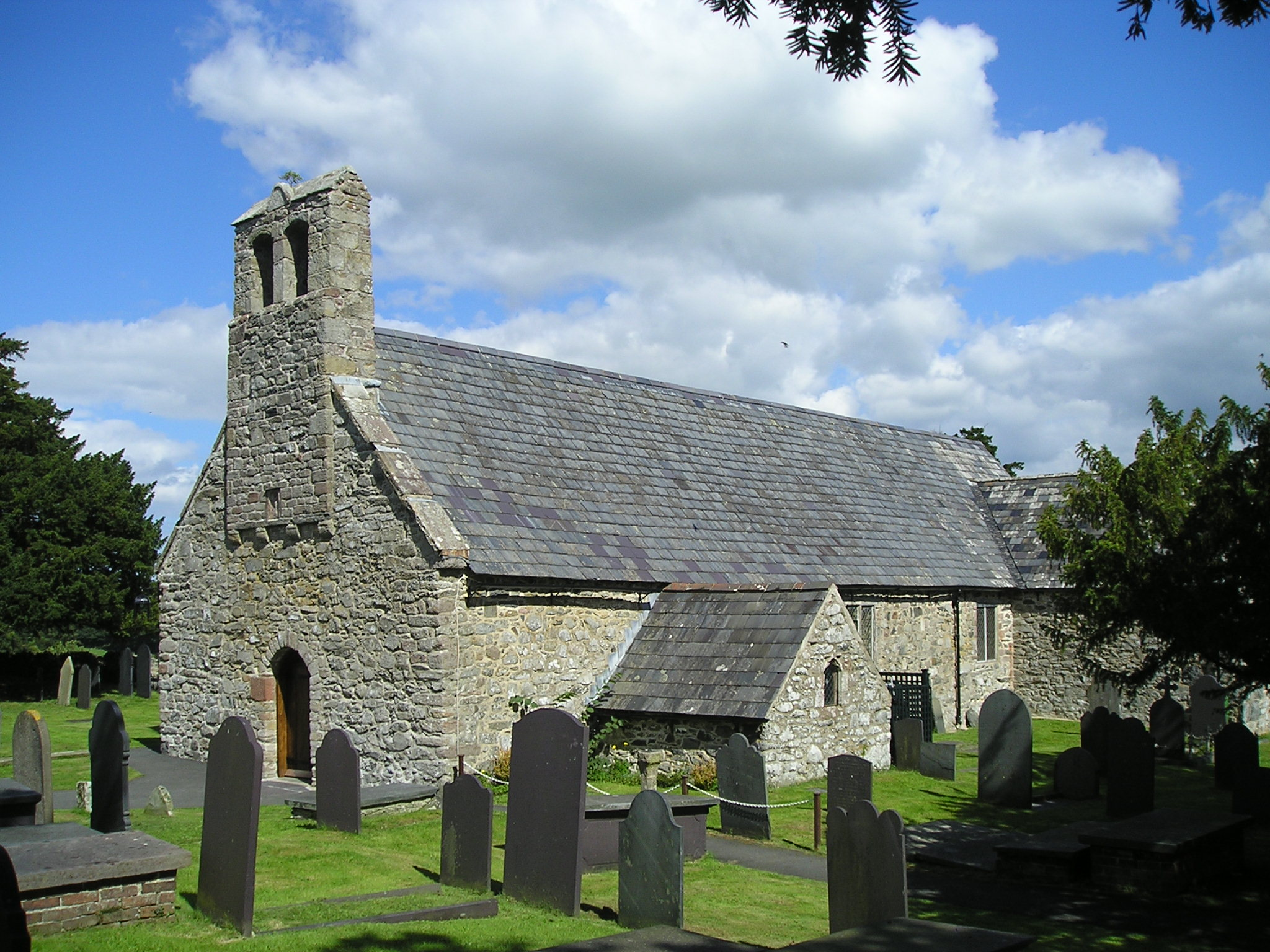

- Location in Conwy County Borough
- OS grid reference: SH 776 703
- Location: Caerhun, Conwy County Borough
- Country: Wales
- Denomination: Church in Wales

History
- Status: Active
- Dedication: Saint Mary

Architecture
- Heritage designation: Grade I
- Designated: 13 October 1966
- Architectural type: Church
- Groundbreaking: 13th century

Administration
- Diocese: Bangor
- Archdeaconry: Bangor
- Deanery: Synod Bangor
- Parish: Bro Celynnin

St Mary's Church is an active parish church in Caerhun, Conwy County Borough, Wales. A scattered settlement, Caerhun lies 6.5 km to the south of Conwy. The church stands in the north-east corner of the remains of the Roman fort of Canovium. Its wider setting is the 19th century parkland of Caer Rhun Hall. Cadw records that the church dates from the 13th century. It is a Grade I listed building, and the Caer Rhun parkland within which is sited is listed on the Cadw/ICOMOS Register of Parks and Gardens of Special Historic Interest in Wales.

== History ==
Caerhun lies 6.5 km to the south of Conwy on the east bank of the River Conwy. Richard Haslam, Julian Orbach and Adam Voelcker, in their 2009 edition Gywnedd, in the Buildings of Wales series, call it, "hardly a village". From AD77 until the 4th century, the site was occupied by the Roman fort of Canovium, begun by Gnaeus Julius Agricola during his invasion of Wales, and the largest Roman fortification in the area.

The Church of St Mary dates from the 13th century. Later medieval additions were made in the 14th and 15th centuries. The church was restored in 1851. In the late 19th century, the Caer Rhun estate was extensively redeveloped by Major-General G. H. Gough, and the church is entirely enclosed by Caer Rhun parkland.

The church remains an active parish church in the Diocese of Bangor and regular services are held.

== Architecture and description ==
St Mary's is a small and simple church comprising a combined nave and chancel, a south chapel and a bellcote. The construction material is local rubble, under a slate roof. St Mary's is a Grade I listed building. The lychgate is listed Grade II. The surrounding parkland is listed, also at Grade II, on the Cadw/ICOMOS Register of Parks and Gardens of Special Historic Interest in Wales.

== Sources ==
- Haslam, Richard; Orbach, Julian; Voelcker, Adam (2009). Gwynedd. The Buildings of Wales. New Haven, US and London: Yale University Press. ISBN 978-0-300-14169-6. OCLC 1023292902.
