= Llanbedr-y-Cennin =

Village in Conwy County Borough, Wales

Coordinates: 53.206°N 3.852°W

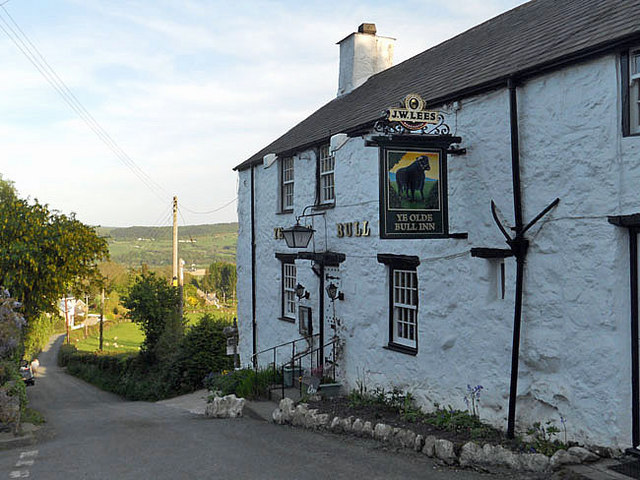
- Ye Olde Bull Inn public house, Llanbedr-y-Cennin

- Location within Conwy
- OS grid reference: SH763692
- Community: Caerhun
- Principal area: Conwy
- Country: Wales
- Sovereign state: United Kingdom
- Post town: CONWY
- Postcode district: LL32
- Dialling code: 01492
- Police: North Wales
- Fire: North Wales
- Ambulance: Welsh
- UK Parliament: Bangor Aberconwy
- Senedd Cymru – Welsh Parliament: Aberconwy

Llanbedr-y-Cennin is a small village in Conwy county borough, Wales, in the community of Caerhun.

It lies in the foothills on the western side of the Conwy valley, in Wales. The river Conwy runs through the valley, running into the sea to the north, at the town of Conwy, which is about five miles north of the village. The village lies on the eastern edge of the Snowdonia National Park. Near the village lies the Iron Age fort of Pen y Gaer.

The village itself has no bus service, but buses can be accessed at nearby Tal-y-Bont.

In recent years the village has become popular with ornithologists as one of the best places in Wales to observe rare hawfinches. They feed adjacent to the churchyard, attracting many bird watchers in early spring.

The village was an ancient parish, and then (from 1974) a community. It was abolished in 1983 and absorbed into Caerhun.

== Name of the village ==
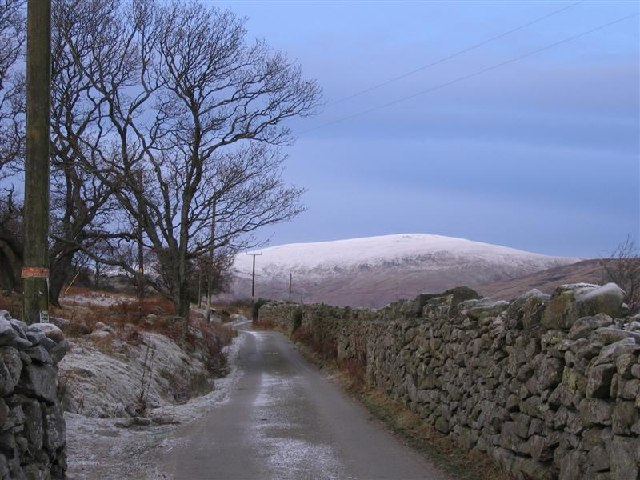
The road to Llyn Eigiau from Llanbedr-y-Cennin

"Llanbedr" means St Peter's church in Welsh, while Cennin can refer to leeks or to daffodils, the latter being "Cennin Pedr" (St Peter's leeks) in Welsh.

== Historical background ==
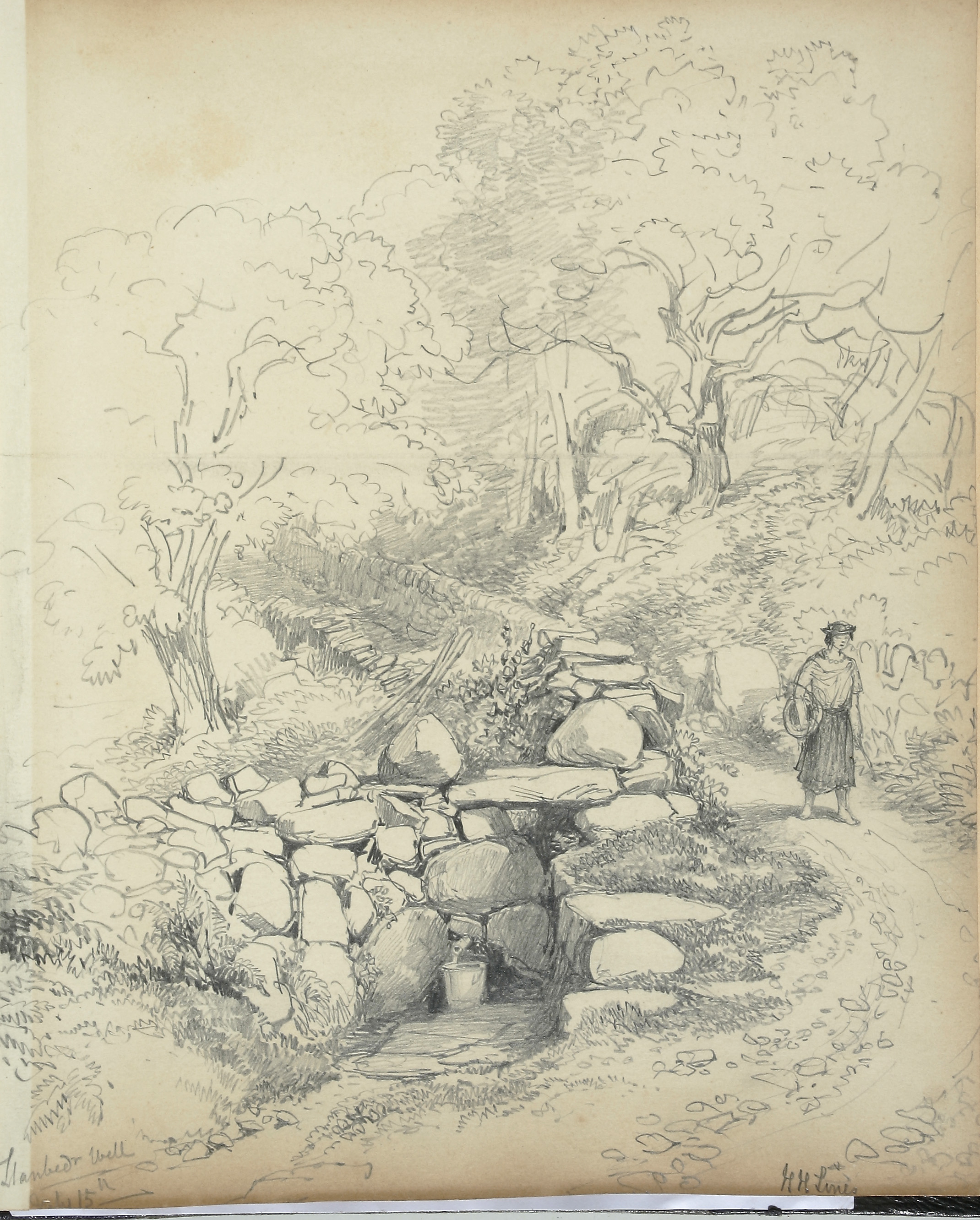
Peter's Well drawn by Henry Harris Lines in 1872 or 1873

The village grew out of a mainly pastoral industry (mostly sheep farming and dairy produce). It has a parish church (Anglican), a Nonconformist chapel (Independent), and a local pub (Ye Olde Bull Inn) which served J.W. Lees real ale (from a Manchester brewery). In the 1960s, the village's only shop used to be a bakery and post office also, but the post office has been discontinued. The public house closed its doors to the public as a J.W. Lees owned pub for the last time in May 2018. On 27 September 2019 the pub re-opened as a Free house.

An ancient well at Llanbedr-y-Cennin, ‘Ffyonnen Bedr’ (‘Peter’s Well’) was believed to have healing powers.

=== Artists' Colony ===
The latter 19th century saw a number of artists living in Llanbedr-y-cennin and neighbouring Tal-y-bont. The art movement, which had started in Betws-y-coed in the 1850s, saw a movement down the valley after the arrival of the railway in Betws-y-coed. Initial settlement was in Trefriw, and the 1871 census listed the first artist settler in Llanbedr/Tal-y-bont as J.Cole. There were 7 artists living here by the 1881 census, and 15 by 1891.

Charles Potter, an artist from Oldham (many of the artists were originally from the Manchester area), was instrumental in setting up the Tal-y-bont Artists Club, and in raising funds to construct in 1886 the ‘Artists Club’ building at Tal-y-bont (actually Llandbedr-y-cennin), and he became its first President. The group had originally starting meeting informally at the Olde Bull Inn in 1883, then in 1884 used the upper floor of a stable building (above a carpenter's workshop, and now demolished) as their first studio.

Named "Walden", the building offered a studio, a gallery, a classroom, a billiard room, and entertainment space. It originally had 40 members, male artists who lived or worked locally, although there were 150 honorary members. It had a committee of 17 members. The building was also used to hold art courses for clubs from far-and-wide, and every autumn there was an exhibition, despite the fact that this was not an altogether accessible place to the average picture-buying tourist. Nevertheless, membership (including non-resident members) grew to a number approaching 150.

The artist colony was a strong influence on the formation of the Royal Cambrian Academy of Art, which moved into Plas Mawr, Conwy in 1886.

The colony came to an end at the onset of World War I, and in the 1920s the building became a private home.

A number of artists are buried in the churchyard at Llanbedr.

== Points of note ==
- Snowdonia National Park: In the hills to the west above and beyond the village are roads and hillwalking tracks giving access to the hills and lakes of the Snowdonia National Park. This is the main route of access to Llyn Eigiau.

== Parish rectors ==
Notable rectors of the parish include:

- 1719–1735: John Ellis – also vicar for Caerhun and buried in the parish
- 1802–1826: John Williams – also vicar for Caerhun and buried in the parish
