= Deceangli =

Celtic tribe in Britain

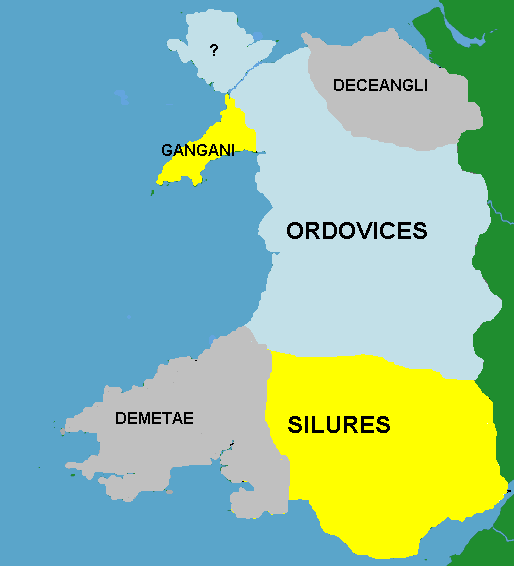
Tribes within the map of present-day Wales at the time of the Roman invasion. Exact boundaries are conjectural.

The Deceangli or Deceangi (Welsh: Tegeingl) were one of the Celtic tribes living in Britain, prior to the Roman invasion of the island. The tribe lived in the region near the modern city of Chester but it is uncertain whether their territory covered only the modern counties of Flintshire, Denbighshire and the adjacent part of Cheshire or whether it extended further west. They lived in hill forts running in a chain through the Clwydian Range and their tribal capital was Canovium.

Assaults on the British tribes were made under the legate Publius Ostorius Scapula who attacked the Deceangli in 48 AD. No Roman town is known to have existed in the territory of this tribe, though the auxiliary fort of Canovium (Caerhun) was probably in their lands and may have had a civilian settlement around it.

Roman mine workings of lead and silver are evident in the regions occupied by the Deceangli. Several sows of lead have been found in Chester, one weighing 192 lbs bears the markings: IMP VESP AVGV T IMP III DECEANGI. Another, found near Tarvin Bridge, weighing 179 lbs is inscribed: IMP VESP V T IMP III COS DECEANGI and is dated to AD 74. Both are displayed in the Grosvenor Museum.

== See also ==
- List of Celtic tribes
- Prehistoric Wales
