= List of crossings of the River Conwy =

List of crossings of the River Conwy.

Key to heritage status
Status	Criteria
I	Grade I listed. Bridge of exceptional interest, sometimes considered to be internationally important
II*	Grade II* listed. Particularly important bridge of more than special interest
II	Grade II listed. Bridge of national importance and special interest

Crossing	Date	Coordinates	Heritage status	Locality	Notes	Image
Outflow of Llyn Conwy		52.9951°N 3.8162°W	-	Llyn Conwy	Source of River	Llyn_Conwy
Footbridge		52.9902°N 3.8184°W	-	Llyn Conwy	Flow is reduced due to abstraction	Bridge over Afon Conwy (geograph 6555993)
Pont-ar-Gonwy		52.9849°N 3.8207°W	-		B4407	Pont-ar-Gonwy_-_geograph.org.uk_-_1173444
Farm Bridge		53.0068°N 3.7529°W	-	Permant		
Pont Ysbyty Ifan	17th-18th Cent	53.0241°N 3.7276°W	II*	Ysbyty Ifan		The_road_bridge_in_the_village_at_Ysbyty_Ifan_-_geograph.org.uk_-_4354385
Pont Hendre-isaf	1820	53.0458°N 3.7077°W	II	Pentrefoelas	A5	
Pont Rhyd-y-Dyfrgi	1788	53.0472°N 3.7192°W	II	Pentrefoelas		
Pont Rhyd-y-Dyfrgi	1862	53.0478°N 3.7232°W	-	Pentrefoelas		Road_to_Voelas_Lodge_-_geograph.org.uk_-_3163980
A5 Bridge		53.048°N 3.7326°W	-	Padog		
Pont Rhyd-Llanfair	1780	53.0562°N 3.7503°W	II			
Footbridge		53.0593°N 3.7596°W	-			
Bont Newydd	1826	53.0647°N 3.7764°W	II		B4406	Bont Newydd, Afon Conwy, nr. Betws-y-Coed - geograph.org.uk - 34404
Pont yr Afanc	1800	53.0757°N 3.7954°W	II	Betws-y-Coed	A470	Afon Conwy - geograph.org.uk - 1032513
Waterloo Bridge	1816	53.0852°N 3.7953°W	I	Betws-y-Coed	A5	Betws_Y_Coed_iron_bridge_-_geograph.org.uk_-_289742
Sappers Bridge	1930	53.0923°N 3.799°W	-	Betws-y-Coed	Closed since 2021	Suspension_Bridge_at_Betws-Y-Coed_-_geograph.org.uk_-_771805
Rail Bridge	1868	53.1191°N 3.792°W	-	Conwy Valley Line		Railway_bridge_across_the_Afon_Conwy_-_geograph.org.uk_-_2304296
Pont Fawr	1636	53.1371°N 3.7974°W	I	Llanrwst		Pont_fawr,_Llanrwst_-_geograph.org.uk_-_5568334
Gower's Bridge		53.1431°N 3.8068°W	-	Llanrwst		Pont_Gower_-_Gower_Bridge_-_geograph.org.uk_-_4200574
Dolgarrog Pipe Bridge		53.1845°N 3.8264°W	-	Dolgarrog	Footbridge and Fresh Water Pipes	Dolgarrog_bridge_viewed_south_westwards_-_geograph.org.uk_-_3744648
Tal-y-Cafn Bridge		53.2292°N 3.82°W	-	Tal-y-Cafn	B5279	Tal-y-cafn_bridge_-_geograph.org.uk_-_2430440
Conwy Railway Bridge	1849	53.2803°N 3.8236°W	I	Chester and Holyhead Railway		Conway_Tubular_Bridge
Conwy Suspension Bridge	1826	53.2805°N 3.8238°W	I	Conwy	Now Pedestrian Only	Conwy_Suspension_Bridge_(8010)
Conwy Bridge		53.2807°N 3.824°W	-	Conwy	A547	Conwy_Bridge_-_geograph.org.uk_-_5636802
Conwy Tunnel	1991	53.2887°N 3.8302°W	-	Conwy	A55	Entrance_to_the_Conwy_Tunnel_-_geograph.org.uk_-_1483330

== Sources ==
- "Conwy crossings". Institution of Civil Engineers (ICE).
