= Llyn Dulyn =

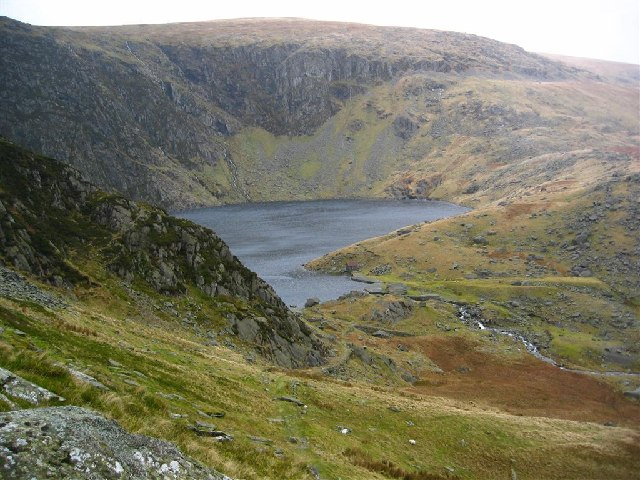

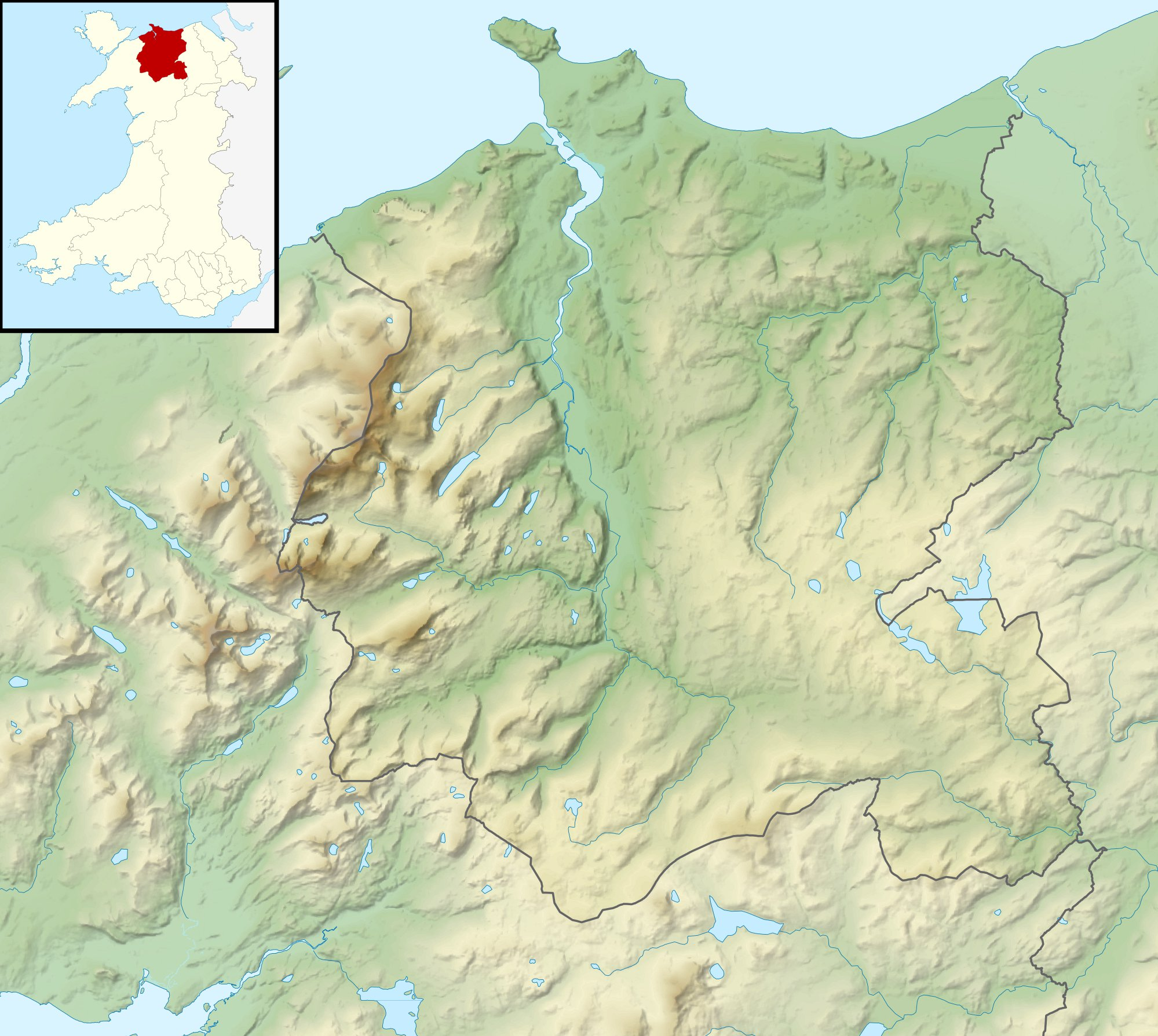
- Location within Conwy
- Location: Snowdonia, North Wales
- Coordinates: 53°10′49″N 3°56′45″W
- Type: natural lake, reservoir
- Primary outflows: Afon Dulyn
- Basin countries: United Kingdom
- Surface area: 33 acres (13 ha)
- Max. depth: 189 ft (58 m)

Llyn Dulyn (Welsh for 'black lake') is a lake on the edge of the Carneddau range of mountains in Snowdonia, North Wales. The lake is 33 acres (130,000 m^{2}) in extent and 189 feet (58 metres) deep. Less than a kilometre to its south lies the smaller Llyn Melynllyn. Cliffs rise steeply from the lake edge up to the summits of Garnedd Uchaf and Foel Grach, giving it a dark brooding appearance; hence its name.

The lake was dammed in 1881, to increase its capacity, and was significantly altered in 1931 by Llandudno Waterworks. As a reservoir Dulyn (along with Melynllyn) provided water for the town of Llandudno. The reservoir was repurposed in 1997 for use as hydroelectric generation.

The outflow from the lake, the Afon Dulyn, also feeds water into neighbouring Llyn Eigiau. Afon Dulyn flows north-east, passing Tal-y-bont before joining the River Conwy.

The cwm has been the site of a number of aeroplane crashes including that of an American Dakota aircraft which crashed into the cliffs above the lake in 1944 killing all four crew.

== Folklore ==
Marc Morris, in his biography of King Edward I of England, claims that in June 1284 Llyn Cwm Dulyn was the setting for the court of the king for victory celebrations, following his defeat of Llywelyn ap Gruffudd, with an Arthurian theme, including the King's 45th birthday. "Back in Wales, the search for symbols of conquest and the celebration of victory continued in a similarly Arthurian vein, For most of June, including his forty-fifth birthday, the king chose to keep his court at Llyn Cwm Dulyn, a deep, dark lake in the mountains to the south of Caernarfon, reputed to have mystical properties." That lake was clearly stated as being 'to the south of Caernarfon' and, thus, not the Llyn Dulyn of this article. Though Marc Morris does not mention nor reference it in his book, documentary evidence of Edward I's presence at Llyn Cwm Dulyn (i.e. near Llanllyfni) exists in the form of a June 1284 letter from Edward to John I, Duke of Brabant, in a clearly abortive effort to mediate between John and the Duke of Guelders over the Duchy of Limberg; the dispute eventually led to the Battle of Worringen, four years later (see: UK National Archives, ref: SC 1/12/57). Marc Morris has accepted his error (2 July 2026) in giving Llyn Cwm Dulyn when primary sources in fact show 'Baladeulyn' or very close variants. The National Archives index for the letter of June 1284 also incorrectly identifies the letter as written at 'Llyn-cwm-Dulyn' [sic] when the original, which is heavily stained in the relevant part, appears to read 'Baladeulyn' (i.e., modern-day Nantlle). There is thus no evidence to support the Llyn Cwm Dulyn claim, whomever makes it.

A stone causeway (now underwater) once led into the lake. At the end of the causeway was a stone known as the Red Altar. Tradition states that if a person poured water on the altar then it would rain within a day. It is also said that if a person stands at the edge of the lake on one of the three "spirit nights" (including Halloween), then he or she will see images in the water of those who will die within the year. It is further said that people who have led evil lives are sometimes dragged by demons down into the black waters of the lake. A local witch who mysteriously disappeared is said to have suffered this fate.
