= John Williams (schoolmaster, born 1760) =

Welsh cleric and schoolmaster (1760–1826)

John Williams (1760–1826) was a Welsh cleric and schoolmaster.

== Life ==
Williams's father, also called John, was agent to the Gwydir Estate in Llanrwst. Williams was educated at Jesus College, Oxford, matriculating on 15 May 1777, then obtaining degrees of Bachelor of Arts (1781) and Master of Arts. He was appointed to a Fellowship of the college in 1783. He was ordained on 19 September 1784, in the Diocese of Bangor, and was licensed to the chapelry in Betws-y-Coed. In 1791, he became master of the Free school in Llanrwst (holding this post until 1812), and also became perpetual curate of Dolwyddelan and Capel Curig. He became rector of Llanbedr-y-Cennin and Caerhun in 1802. He died in 1826 and was buried at Llanbedr-y-Cennin.

Williams had a particular interest in Welsh literature. He preserved a large collection of papers from the Wynns of Gwydir, and also letters from Goronwy Owen and Edward Owen. Various manuscripts held by the National Library of Wales came from his collection as well.
