= John Ellis (antiquarian) =

Welsh priest and antiquarian

- Born: 1674
- Died: July 1735 (aged 60 or 61); Llanbedr-y-Cennin, Wales, United Kingdom
- Education: Jesus College, Oxford
- Spouse: Cathrine Ellis (m. 1720)

John Ellis (1674 – July 1735) was a Welsh priest and antiquarian.

== Early life and education ==
Ellis was the second son of Jane (née Marsh, formerly widow of Herbert Griffith, Brynodol) and Thomas Ellis, from Llandegwning, Llŷn. He was educated at Jesus College, Oxford, matriculating there on 31 March 1690 aged only 16. He obtained his Bachelor of Arts degree in 1693 and his Master of Arts degree in 1696.

== Career ==
He was also appointed as a Fellow of Jesus College in 1696, holding this position until 1713. In 1703, he obtained the degree of Bachelor of Divinity. He was ordained deacon on 7 September 1707, with his ordination to the priesthood taking place on 4 July 1708. He was then appointed rector of Llandwrog on 30 September 1710; in the same year, he was made a Canon of Bangor Cathedral. In 1713, he was made prebend of Llanfair Dyffryn Clwyd and surrendered his position at Bangor Cathedral. On 24 July 1719, he became rector of Llanbedr-y-cennin and vicar of Caerhun.

Ellis had a particular interest in antiquarian matters and assisted with Browne Willis's work A Survey of the Cathedral Church of Bangor in 1721, as Willis acknowledged.

== Personal life ==
Wllis married Catherine Humphreys, daughter of Richard Humphreys of Hendregwenllian, Penrhyndeudraeth, Gwynedd on 13 May 1720. She was the step-sister of Humphrey Humphreys, Bishop of Bangor from 1689 to 1701. Only one of their three children survived infancy, a son who was also called John, later becoming vicar of Bangor.

Ellis himself died at Llanbedr-y-cennin in July 1735 and his burial was recorded in the parish registers on 12 July 1735.
