= Afon Gyffin =

River in Conwy County Borough, Wales

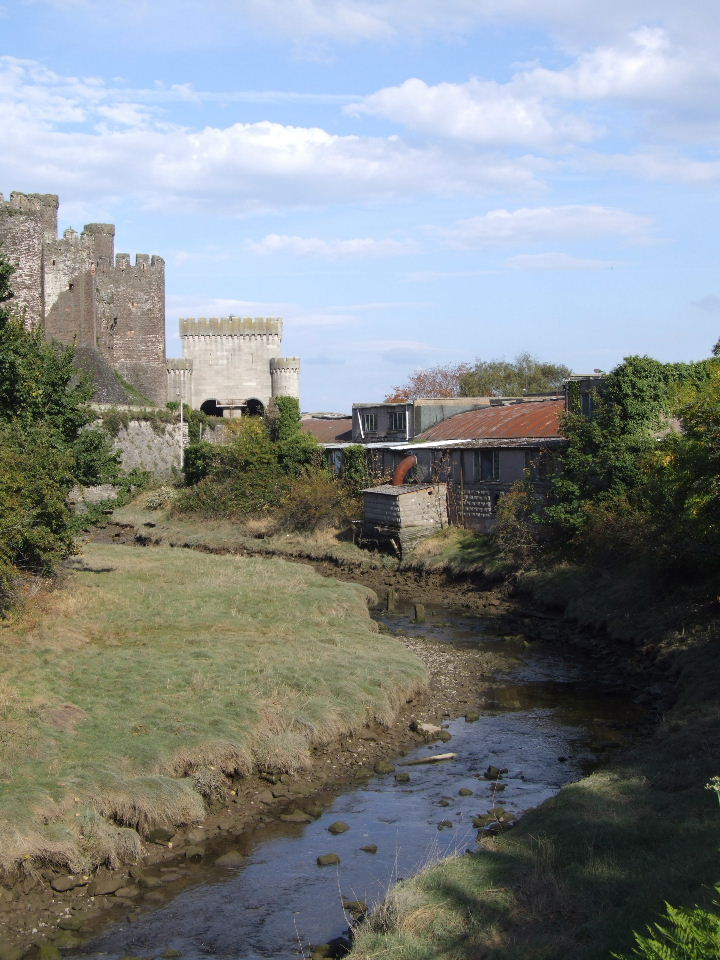

Location
- Sovereign state: United Kingdom
- Country: Wales
- Principal area: Conwy County Borough

Physical characteristics
- Mouth: River Conwy
  - coordinates: 53°16′45″N 3°49′28″W

Afon Gyffin (Welsh for 'River Gyffin') is a river in Conwy County Borough.

== Geography ==
The river runs into the River Conwy close to Conwy Castle.

An area of ancient semi-natural woodland exists close to the Afon Gyffin, called Coed Merchlyn.

The geology of the surrounding ground is SE-dipping Lower Silurian mudstone-dominated succession draped by boulder clay.

== History ==
The first stage of the construction of Conwy town walls included digging ditches and erecting a palisade before the town was built, securing the area. This allowed a half-timbered mill on the Gyffin River to be built. The town walls were also connected to the walls of the castle, which were located on a rocky ground at the mouth of the Gyffin River to the Conwy riverbed. Conwy town access was also protected from the south by the river Gyffin which flowed into Conwy near the castle.

In 1896 there was concern that the river was polluted, caused by the Tre-castell Mining Company which was alleged to have caused the death of animals in close proximity. Testing of the stream produced lead in solution and suspension.
