= Pen y Gaer =

Prehistoric site in Snowdonia, Wales

Coordinates: 53.2061°N 3.8730°W

Highest point
- Elevation: 385 m (1,263 ft)
- Prominence: 36 m (118 ft)
- Parent peak: Carnedd Llewelyn
- Listing: TuMP

Geography
- Location: Snowdonia
- OS grid: SH749693

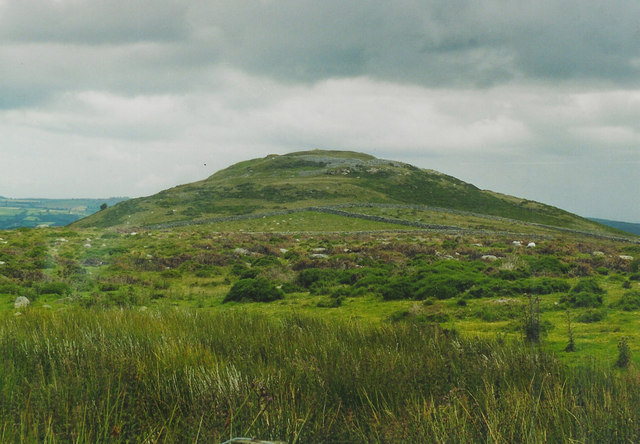
Pen y Gaer from the west

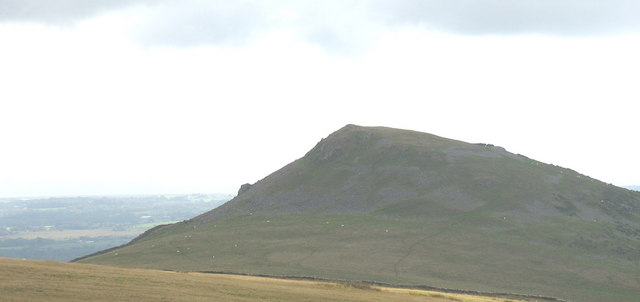
Pen y Gaer from the north

Pen y Gaer (or Pen-y-gaer) is the location of a Bronze Age and Iron Age hillfort near the village of Llanbedr-y-Cennin in the Conwy valley, Wales.

A natural defensive site, it had a long history of occupation, indicated by the complexity of the defences, which were amended over time. There are two Bronze Age cairns on the north-west slope, and extensive prehistoric and later field systems are nearby. The remains as seen today are mostly of Iron Age origin, but further earthworks, probably of medieval origin, lie on the south-eastern slopes.

The remains of the two walls of stone can be seen, as can those of a chevaux-de-frise. The entrance is to the west, and access can be gained from a car park, reached by the road from the village.

== See also ==
- List of hillforts in Wales
