= P. K. Baillie Reynolds =

British classical scholar and archaeologist

Paul Kenneth Baillie Reynolds, CBE (1896–1973) was a British classical scholar and archaeologist who studied specialised Roman troops such as the frumentarii and the vigiles.

He was the son of Louis Baillie Reynolds, a stockbroker, and novelist Gertrude Minnie Robins. He studied at Hertford College, Oxford between 1915 and 1919, his studies being interrupted by World War I. He served in the Royal Artillery.

By 1921, he had become a Pelham student at the British School in Rome. While Rome he wrote books and articles for which he is well remembered (e.g., The Troops Quartered in the Castra Peregrina JRS 13 1923, pages 168–87; The Vigiles of Imperial Rome, Oxford 1926). Baillie Reynolds extensively researched the remains of ancient Rome's aqueducts. He stayed at Rome until 1923.

In 1924, Baillie Reynolds became a lecturer on Ancient history at Aberystwyth University. While at Aberystwyth, he also directed the excavations of Kanovium, the Roman fort at Caerhun, North Wales, over a period of four summers from 1926. He published a series of reports on these excavations in Archaeologia Cambrensis, which were published as a collection in 1938; they are considered a classic study of their type. At this time he also published numerous books and reports on archaeological sites in Britain and beyond. He is best known for his book, "The Vigiles of Imperial Rome" (1926). In 1934 he became an Inspector of Ancient Monuments, England, and Chief Inspector from 1954 to 1961. As an Inspector, he wrote guide books for some of the many sites under Government care, some of which remained in print for over twenty years (e.g., "Chysauster" Cornwall, HMSO Guides, London 1960).

His last significant task was to oversee repairs to the Aqua Claudia aqueduct in Rome, which ran through the grounds of the British Embassy. A report of this work was published in the journal Archaeologia Volume 100, 1966. It was his last publication, and he died in 1973.

Baillie Reynolds had a distinguished career, recognised by his honours, firstly becoming an Officer of the Order of the British Empire and subsequently made a Commander of the Order.

During World War II, Baillie-Reynolds was one of the founding members of the Monuments Men (M.F.A.A.), who sought to protect European art treasures during and after the war.

== Known publications ==
Publications below are listed in order of first known date of publication. Known subsequent publication dates are mentioned at the end of each listing.

- Baillie Reynolds, P.K. (1926), "'Two fragments of Samian pottery, in the museum of the University College of Wales, Aberystwyth'", Aberystwyth Studies, 8: 11–5
- Baillie Reynolds, P.K. (1996) [1926]. The Vigiles of Imperial Rome. Chicago, Illinois: Ares. ISBN 0-89005-552-1. Originally published in 1926 by Oxford University Press, London. 133 pages.
- Baillie Reynolds, P.K.; James Frederick Mountford (1928). One Hundred Post-Classical Latin. Aberystwyth: S.V. Galloway.
- Baillie Reynolds, P.K.; Frederic James Edward Raby (1936). Castle Acre Priory. London: Ministry of Works. Ancient Monuments and Historic Buildings. Official Guides. ISBN 1-85074-105-0 OCLC 21886380 (for 1986 publication). Other publication dates found: 1937, 1946, 1951, 1952, 1975.
- Baillie Reynolds, P.K.; F.J.E. Raby (1938). Framlingham Castle, Suffolk. London: Ministry of Works. Ancient Monuments and Historic Buildings. Official Guides.. Other publication dates found: 1946, 1959, 1977. Full text of 1959 edition at Internet Archive.
- Baillie Reynolds, P.K. (February 1938). Excavations on the site of the Roman fort of Kanovium at Caerhun, Caernarvonshire: collected reports on the excavations of the years 1926–1929 and on the pottery and other objects found. Kanovium Excavation Committee. Cardiff: William Lewis, Printers. 282 pages. Baillie Reynolds' reports were originally published in Archaeologia Cambrensis. They included:
  - ‘The coarse pottery’, originally published as the 6th interim report, Archaeologia Cambrensis, 89 [1934] 37–82
  - Other reports from Archaeologia Cambrensis, 82–91 (1927–36);
- Baillie Reynolds, P.K. (1946). Croxden Abbey, Staffordshire. London: Ministry of Works, Ancient Monuments and Historic Buildings, leaflet guides.
- Baillie Reynolds, P.K. (1948). Kenilworth Castle, Warwickshire. London: Her Majesty's Stationery Office (H.M.S.O.). Part of the Ancient monuments and historic buildings series, published by Ministry of Public Building and Works, via H.M.S.O.
- Baillie Reynolds, P.K.; Sir Alfred William Clapham (1956). Thornton Abbey, Lincolnshire. London: Ministry of Works. Ancient Monuments and Historic Buildings. Official Guides.. Also published as Thornton Abbey, Humberside. ISBN 0-11-670019-X
- Rose, Graham; P.K. Baillie Reynolds (1958). Egglestone Abbey, Yorkshire. London: Ministry of Works. Ancient Monuments and Historic Buildings. Official Guides., 24 pages. Also published 1976, ISBN 0-11-670134-X
- Baillie Reynolds, P.K. (1960). Chysauster, Cornwall. London: Her Majesty's Stationery Office (H.M.S.O.). Part of the Ancient monuments and historic buildings series, published by Ministry of Public Building and Works, via H.M.S.O. Other publication dates found: 1965, 1968, 1978. ISBN 0-11-671460-3 (for 1978)
- Baillie Reynolds, P.K.; & T.A. Bailey (1966), "The aqueduct in the grounds of the British embassy in Rome", Archaeologia, vol. 100, Oxford: Printed by Vivian Ridler for the Society of Antiquaries of London, pp. 81–104, doi:10.1017/s0261340900013710, ISBN 0-85431-066-5. Also ISBN 978-0-85431-066-1(Note: not all isbn search engines yield results using just the ISBN. Internet Book Database, Shelfari do yield the correct title. A search using P.K. Baillie Reynolds on Worldcat yields his known publications, including this title).
