= Afon Melynllyn =

Tributary in the Carneddau, north Wales

Coordinates: 53.18336°N 3.92847°W

Afon Melynllyn is the outflow from Llyn Melynllyn, a lake in the Carneddau mountains in north-west Wales. It is a tributary of Afon Dulyn, itself a tributary of the river Conwy.
