= Llyn Conwy =

Lake in central Snowdonia, Wales

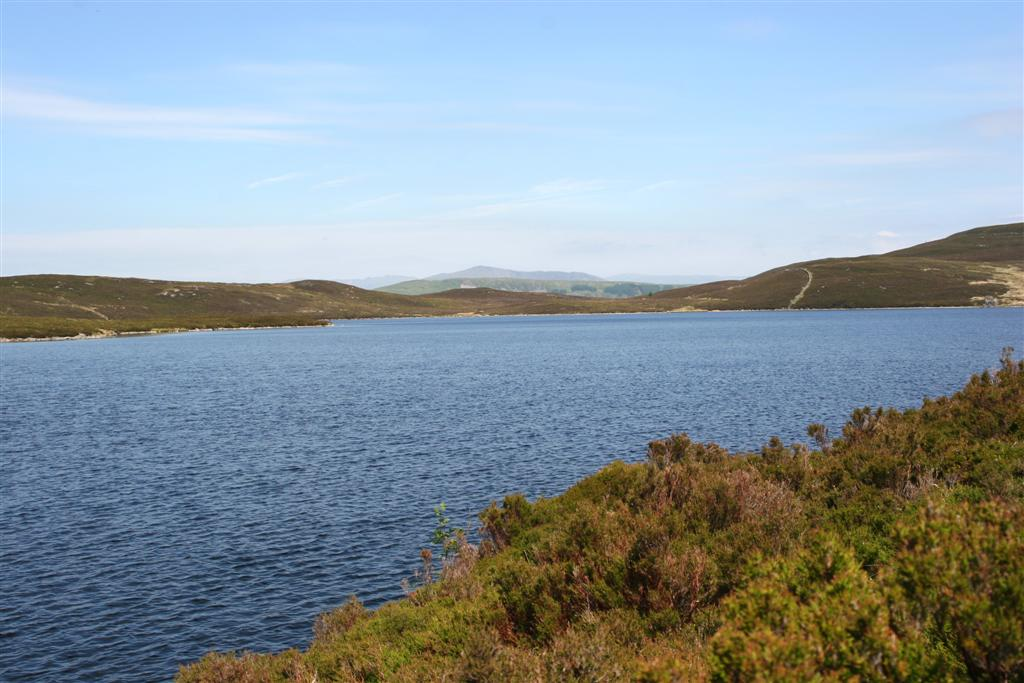

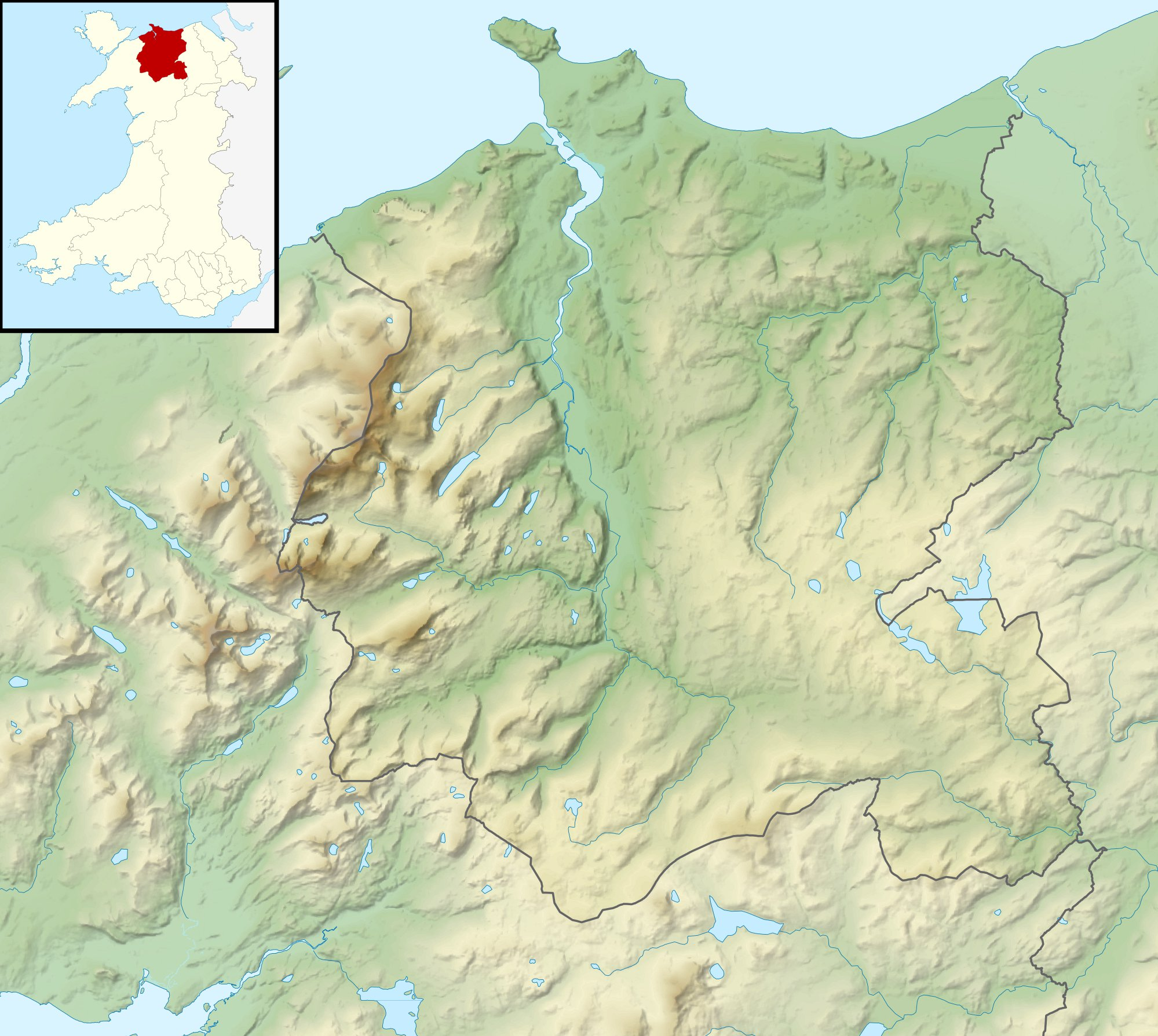
- Location within Conwy
- Location: Conwy, north Wales
- Coordinates: 52.999°N 3.819°W
- Lake type: natural lake, reservoir
- Primary inflows: unnamed streams
- Primary outflows: River Conwy
- Basin countries: United Kingdom
- Max. depth: 16 ft (4.9 m)
- Surface elevation: 1,488 ft (454 m)
- Frozen: sometimes in winter
- Islands: 2

Llyn Conwy (SH780462) is a lake in the county borough of Conwy in central north Wales. It is the source of the River Conwy which, on flowing south out of the lake, swings round to then generally flow in a northerly direction for a distance of some 27 miles (43 km) to its discharge in Conwy Bay. Llyn Conwy lies at a height of about 1,488 ft, with a maximum depth of 16 feet, and is by far the biggest lake of the Migneint moors, an extensive area of blanket mire with high rainfall - about 260 cm p.a. There is a view of Arenig Fawr.

== Geology ==
This is an area of Ordovician rocks, lending its name to the "Llyn Conwy Formation", which is identified by its yellowish rhyolitic tuffs. This Formation also reappears in Afon Tryweryn to the south-east, where the hard rock was utilized in the construction of Llyn Celyn dam.

== Water quality and soil ==
Llyn Conwy is owned by the National Trust and, whilst a natural lake, is managed as a reservoir by Welsh Water.

It supplies some of the water needs of the upper Conwy Valley, including Betws-y-coed and Llanrwst. Contingency plans for drought also name Llyn Conwy as the secondary source in the zone which, along with its own supply area, can feed part of the ‘normal’ Llyn Cowlyd (near Trefriw) supply area. A compensation discharge of 0.91 Ml/d would be required from Llyn Conwy.

The pH level of the lake is reported as pH 7.5257 on average, with calcium carbonate rates at 53.7 mg/L, hardness 3 °GH, free chlorine at 0.2853 mg/L and total chlorine at 0.354 mg/L.

In 2008 the National Trust reported that it was working with its tenant farmers to improve water storage in the Welsh uplands. In this area staff are starting to restore the Migneint blanket bog. Drainage ditches are being blocked to help retain water, to reduce erosion, and to cut the amount of peat entering water courses. Work on the wider Ysbyty Estate aims to improve the quality of drinking water from the lake without the need for expensive treatment works, and to retain the Migneint as one of the largest carbon stores in Wales. Peatland restoration can help enhance wildlife habitats and restore species diversity.

This area is very affected by acid rain and the thin peaty soil is best suited for sheep grazing.

Blanket mire is particularly sensitive to climate change and this location has consequently been used on a number of occasions for scientific research.

== Source of the river Conwy ==
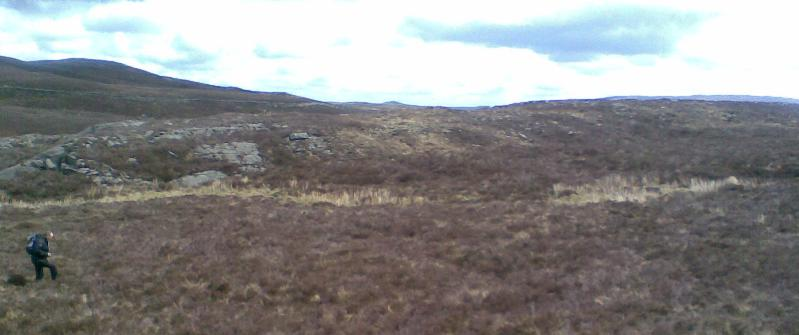
The head of Llyn Conwy's NW feeder-stream. The lighter-coloured grass, indicating the wetter ground, stands out from the heather.

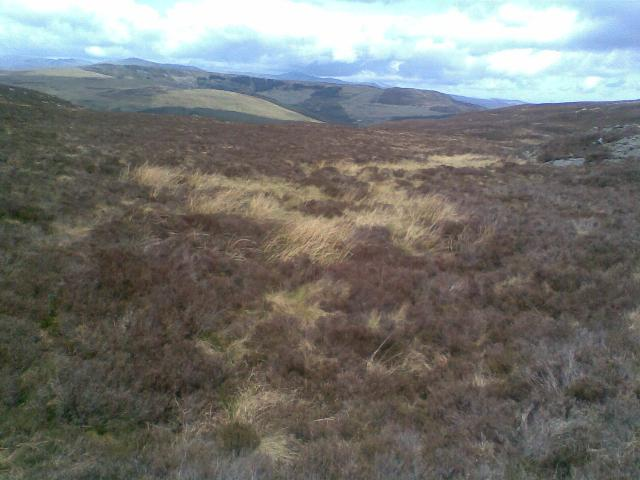
A closer view of the head of the stream on Bryn y Bedol. Upstream of the lake, this is one of the two uppermost sources of the river Conwy.

Whilst the lake is often regarded in a general sense as the source of the river Conwy, much of this area of the Migneint blanket bog contributes water to its uppermost reaches.

The lake itself lies in a small basin and is actually fed by a small number of other unnamed streams within the catchment area, which measures 175ha and ranges in altitude from 435m to 530m. The largest two of these, which enter the lake on its north-western and eastern shores, can be followed for over ¼ mile to the upper edges of the basin, even during drier periods. The heads of these two streams, where the damp ground produces an identifiable flow - at SH774465 on the slopes of Bryn y Bedol, and at SH783467 on the slopes of Pen y Bedw - should perhaps more correctly be regarded as the uppermost sources of the river Conwy.

== Features ==
A small parapet with a sluice-gate, hardly worthy of the word "dam", controls the outflow from the southern end of the lake, the level of which has not changed since the early 19th century Ordnance Survey.

There are three old huts on the sides of the lake. On the north shore, there is an old boathouse that was struck by lightning and destroyed on 5 July 1881, but was subsequently repaired. On the southern shore there is a more intact boathouse that is still in use today as there is a boat housed inside that was formerly used as a lifeboat. Also to the south of that is an old ruined hut that was formerly used by overnight fishermen as a dwelling place.

The lake has two islands, one just off the eastern shore and more to the south, which is covered up by high water levels during most of the year. The other sits to the north east corner of the lake and has a cairn on it, as well as a reasonably big grassy/rocky area.

== Fishing ==
Llyn Conwy was at one time owned and looked after by Lord Penrhyn, who kept the lake well stocked. Over 2 days in 1880 a party caught 111 trout, and a month later some 119 were caught in the infant river Conwy between the lake and Ysbyty Ifan.

In recent decades, Llyn Conwy has endured a decline in the number of people fishing there; the acidity of the water means that fish find it harder to live there, however a process of neutralization is underway there as limestone from the banks of the lake is slowly seeping into the water and levelling the pH levels so that gradually, over a process of ten years, the water will return to its former condition.

== Access ==
The easiest access to the lake is from the B4407, which runs from the A5 near Pentrefoelas to Ffestiniog, near Blaenau Ffestiniog. A right turn from Ffestiniog leads to an old house called 'Llyn Cottage' (often used for night fishing by Lord Penrhyn and his friends), where there is parking and an access path to the lake. It can also be approached from Penmachno, taking the left hand turn sign posted Ysbyty Ifan. The path from this point, whilst following a Right of Way, is far less well defined.

The catchment area around the lake, whilst owned by the National Trust, has a tenant farmer and is Open Access.

== In literature ==
Llyn Conwy is mentioned both by Thomas Pennant, the 18th century Welsh naturalist and antiquary, in his Tours of Wales, and by George Borrow, the traveller and author of Wild Wales, who passed by in 1854.

In his equally descriptive, though more recent, novel The River Conwy (1952), Wilson MacArthur and his wife Joan follow the course of the river Conwy downstream to the sea, starting from Llyn Conwy.
