= Migneint =

Upland area in North West Wales

Coordinates: 52.968886°N 3.818683°W

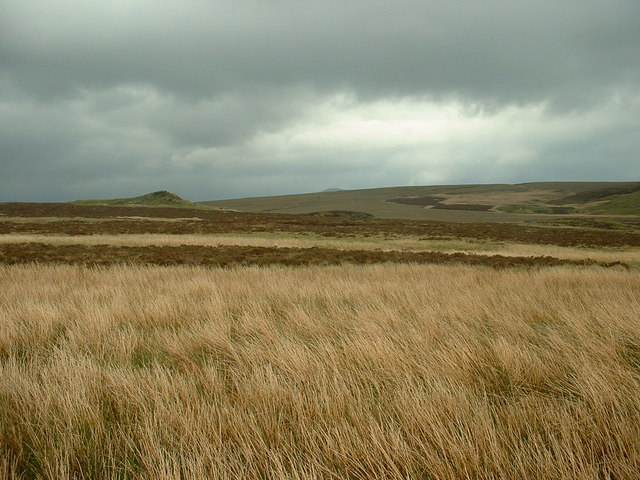
Part of the Migneint's great expanse of moorland.

The Migneint (Welsh pronunciation: [ˈmɪɡnaint]) is a large expanse of moorland in central Snowdonia, north-west Wales. It is part of the Migneint-Arenig-Dduallt Special Area of Conservation, along with the mountains Arenig Fawr, Arenig Fach and Dduallt, covering a range of nearly 200 square kilometres (77 sq mi). It is either the largest area of blanket bog in Wales, or the second largest, after the Berwyn range, further to the east.

The area includes a few small lakes, including Llyn Conwy, the source of the River Conwy, and is bisected by the B4407 road from Ffestiniog to Ysbyty Ifan. Plans have been suggested to hold water on the Migneint for longer, to help prevent flooding in the Conwy valley; but local farmers have voiced concern that this could be harmful to livestock.
