= Gertrude Minnie Robins =

English writer

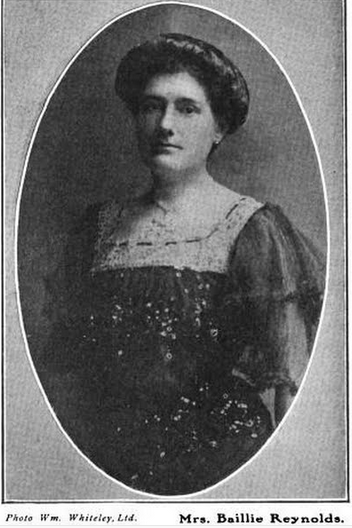
Gertrude Minnie Robins (Mrs. Baillie Reynolds) from a 1907 publication.

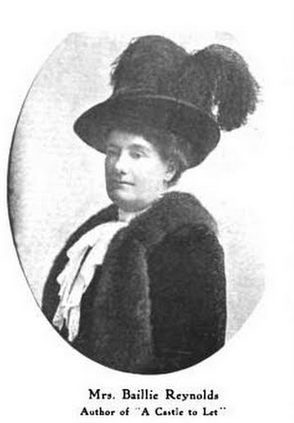
Gertrude Minnie Robins (Mrs. Baillie Reynolds), from a 1917 publication.

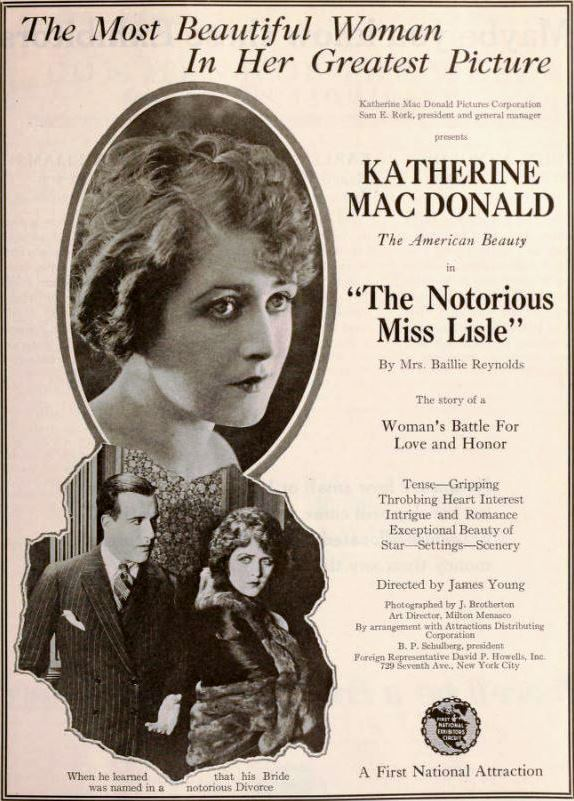
Advertisement for film version of Notorious Miss Lisle (1920), crediting Mrs. Baillie Reynolds as writer

Gertrude Minnie Robins (11 July 1861 — 22 November 1939) was an English writer, author of over fifty novels, many of them under her married name, Mrs. Baillie Reynolds.

== Early life ==
Gertrude Minnie Robins was born in Teddington, the daughter of Julian Robins. Her father was a barrister. She attended South Hampstead High School.

== Career ==
Robins published her first novel, Keep My Secret, in 1886. She would go on to write over fifty novels and story collections, mostly in the crime, mystery, or gothic genres, including A False Position (1887), The Tree of Knowledge (1889), The Ides of March (1892), In the Balance (1893), To Set Her Free (1895), Her Point of View (1896), The Silence is Broken (1897), Nigel Ferrard (1899), The Professional and Other Psychic Stories (1900), The Relations and What They Related (1902), Phoebe in Fetters (1904), The Man Who Won (1905), A Dull Girl's Destiny (1907), Broken Off (1908), Thalassa! (1908), The Supreme Test (1908), The Girl from Nowhere (1910), Out of the Night (1910), Nigel Ferrard (1911), The Notorious Miss Lisle (1911), A Makeshift Marriage (1912), A Doubtful Character (1914), The Daughter Pays (1916), A Castle to Let (1917), Open Sesame! (1918), The King's Widow (1919), Also Ran (1920), The Judgment of Charis (1922), The Lost Discovery (1923), The Spell of Sarnia (1925), The Innocent Accomplice (1928), Whereabouts Unknown (1931), The Missing Two (1932), The Terrible Baron and Other Stories (1933), Very Private Secretary (1933), The Intrusive Tourist (1935), Trouble at Glaye (1936), and It Is Not Safe to Know (1939). "Mrs. Baillie Reynolds has a knack for creating diverting situations and for finding odd and unusual places in which to develop them," noted a reviewer in 1918.

Robins was active in the woman's suffrage movement, and was president of the Society of Women Journalists in 1913. Four of her books were adapted for silent films: The Man Who Won (1918), Notorious Miss Lisle (1920), The Daughter Pays (1920), and Confessions (1925).

== Personal life ==
Gertrude Minnie Robins married a stockbroker, Louis Baillie Reynolds, in 1890. They had three sons, Eustace (1893-1948), Paul Kenneth (1896-1973), and Donald Hugh (1900-1991). She died in 1939, in St. Albans.
