= Llyn Melynllyn =

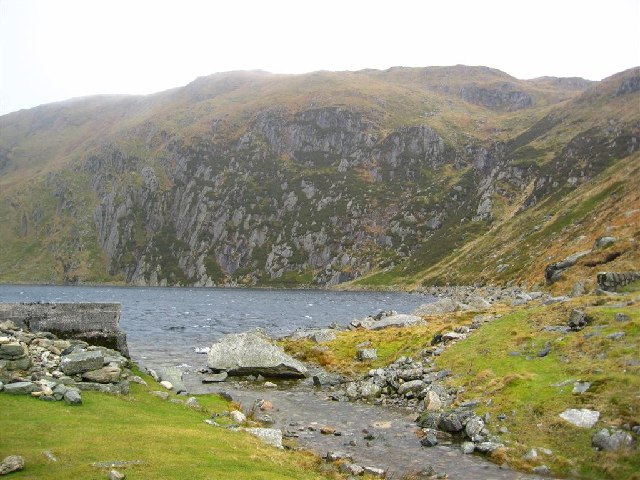

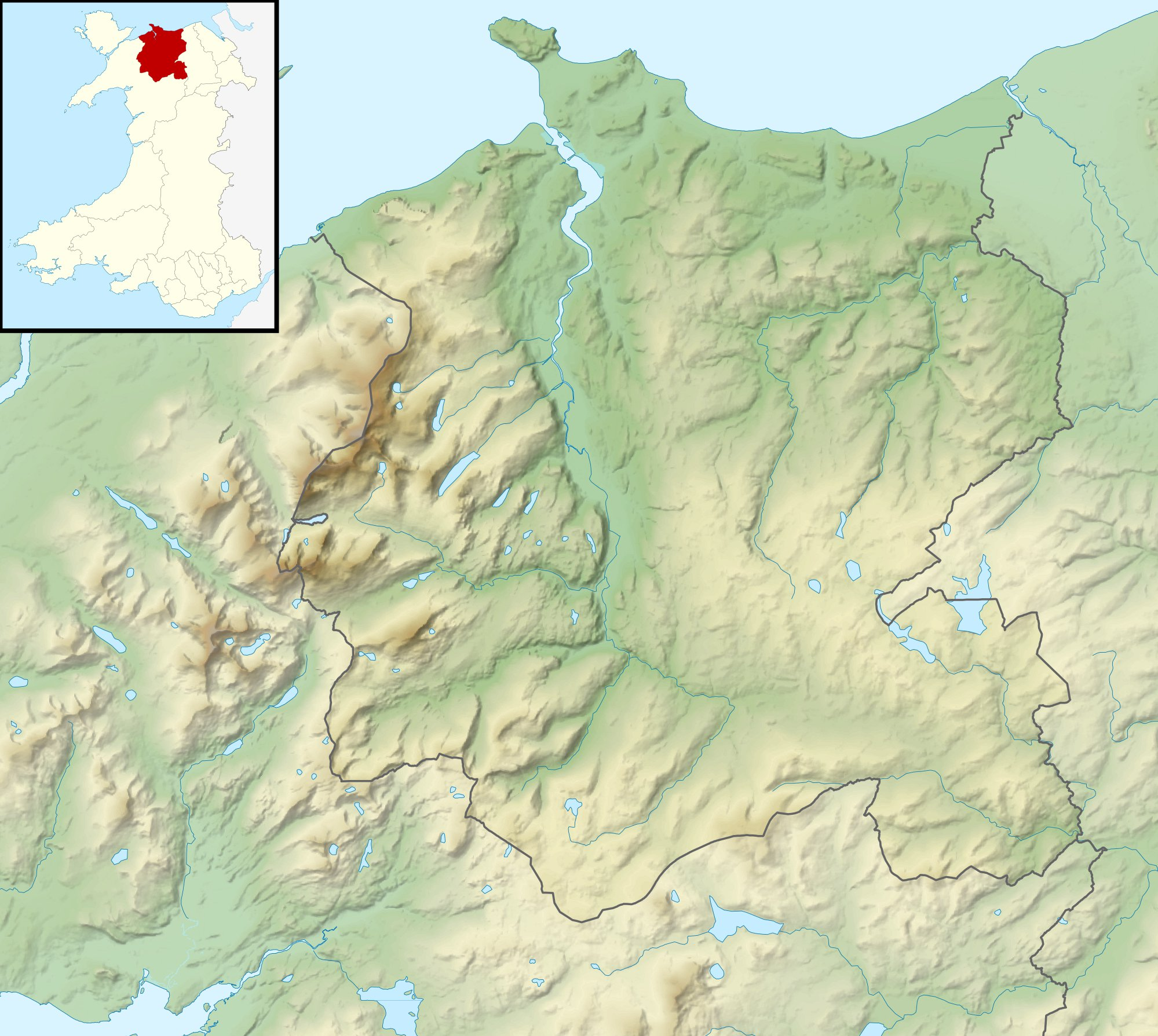
- Location within Conwy
- Location: Snowdonia, North Wales
- Coordinates: 53°10′20″N 3°56′39″W
- Type: natural, reservoir
- Primary outflows: Afon Melynllyn
- Basin countries: United Kingdom
- Surface area: 18.5 acres (7.5 ha)
- Surface elevation: 2,000 ft (600 m)

Llyn Melynllyn (Welsh for 'yellow lake') is a lake within the Carneddau range of mountains in Snowdonia, North Wales.

It lies at a height of just over 2,000 feet (610 m), and has an area of some 18.5 acres (75,000 m^{2}).

Cliffs rise steeply from its western edge, up to the summit of Foel Grach, and down from which most of its feeder streams flow.

A small dam was built at its northern end in 1887, but this was deliberately breached in 1970. The lake acts as a reservoir for the Llandudno area.

Less than a kilometre to its north lies the larger Llyn Dulyn.

The outflow from the lake is called Afon Melynllyn, this stream flowing north-east to join Afon Dulyn, itself a tributary of the river Conwy.
