= Canovium =

Roman fort in Conwy, North Wales

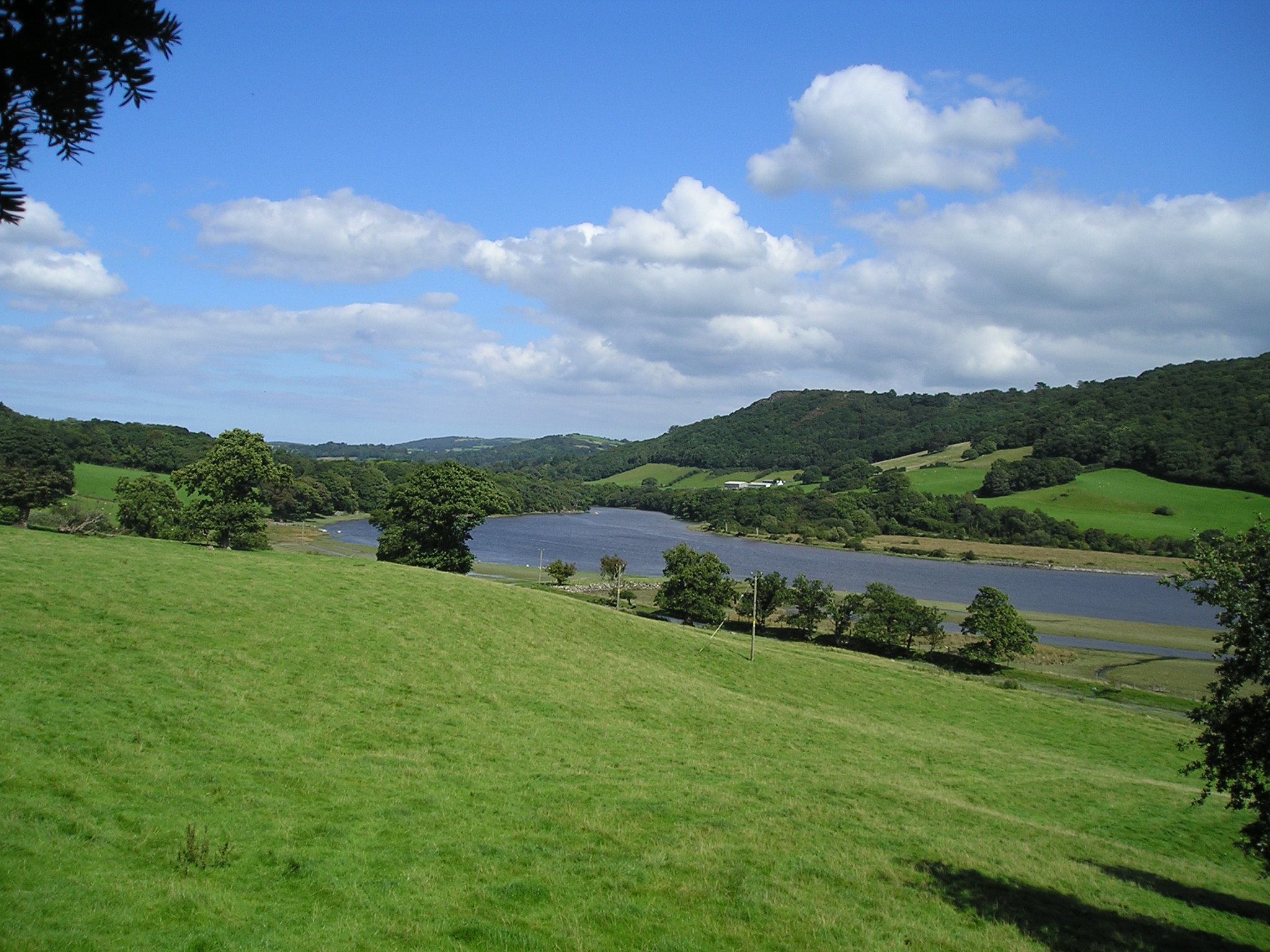
- View from the fort down to the River Conwy

- Location within Conwy
- 53.2161°N 3.8341°W
- Location: Conwy, Wales

History
- Founded: c. 75 AD
- Abandoned: 4th century AD

Canovium was a fort in the Roman province of Britannia. Its site is located at Caerhun in the Conwy valley, in the county borough of Conwy, in North Wales.

== Etymology ==
The fort appears in the Antonine Itinerary as Conovio and in the Ravenna Cosmography as Canubio. The first element possibly represents a borrowing into Latin of a pre-existing Brythonic name for the wetland area (from a word meaning reeds, cawn in Modern Welsh).

Although the second element may derive from Novius (meaning new), it has also been proposed that the –ovium termination may simply mean water or river. Both of these etymologies would seem to reflect the purpose of building a new fort at this location, to control the lowest fording point across the river Conwy.

== Early history ==
Canovium was a square fort built in timber at an important river crossing (at Tal-y-Cafn) by the Roman army around AD 75, possibly to house a 500-strong regiment of foot-soldiers. Rebuilding in stone began in the early 2nd century. It contained the usual headquarters building, commanding officer's house, granaries and barrack blocks, but the two former buildings were unusually large for the size of the fort. There was a bath-house to the east and an extensive vicus to the north. A large second century milestone dedicated to the Emperor Hadrian, now preserved in the British Museum, was found 7 miles from Canovium in the late nineteenth century.

The fort was the largest Roman military installation in the area and it is likely that the administrative functions of the Deceangli tribe were conducted from here. Although the tribe remained largely "un-Romanised" and no Civitas Deceangorum ever existed, the vicus at Canovium the fort may possibly have functioned as such.

== Later history ==
There may have been a brief abandonment of the site in the very late 2nd century, but occupation quickly resumed, with the erection of a new cookhouse, and continued until at least the late 4th century. The north-east quarter of the site is now occupied by the 14th-century parish church of St Mary and its churchyard.

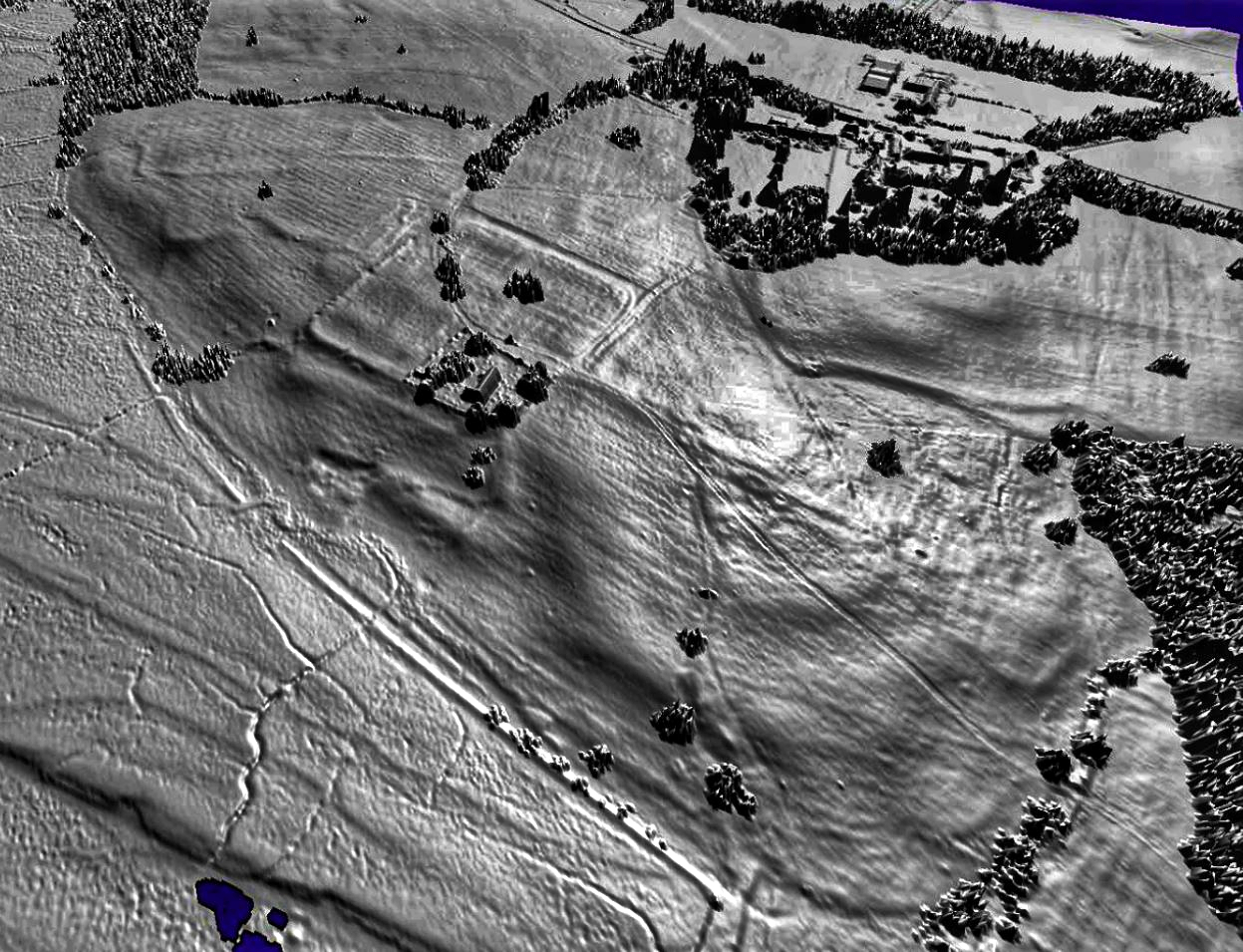
A lidar view of Canovium.

== Academic studies ==
There have been several publications on the Canovium fort, described at the Kanovium Project link below. The classic study of the fort was the 1938 collected reports of P.K. Baillie Reynolds, of Aberystwyth University, the culmination of four summers of excavation by him.

== See also ==
- Sarn Helen
