= Conwy Bay =

Bay in Wales, inlet of Irish Sea

- Bae Conwy (Welsh)
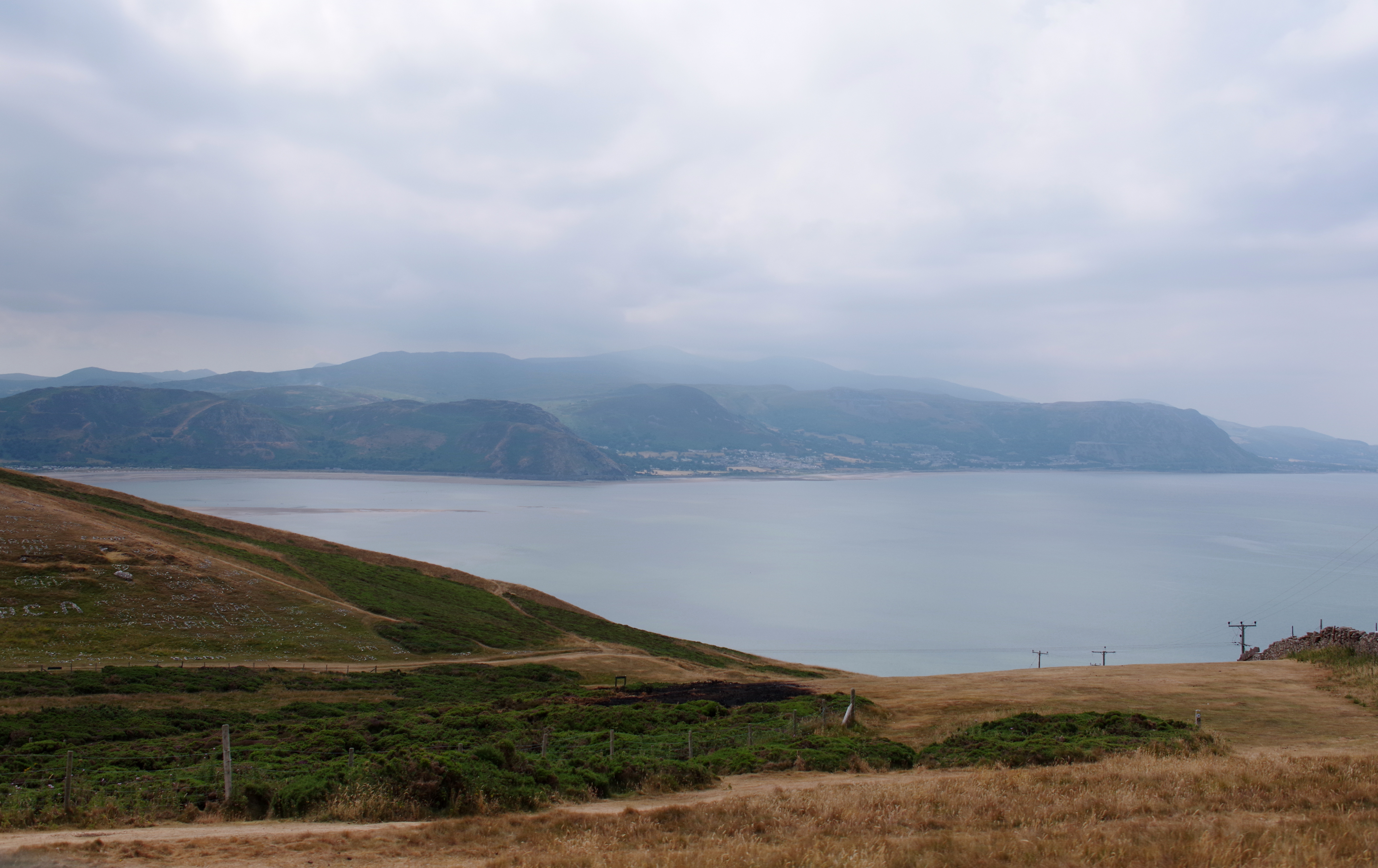
- Conwy Bay from the Great Orme towards Dwygyfylchi and Penmaenmawr.
- Interactive map of Conwy Bay
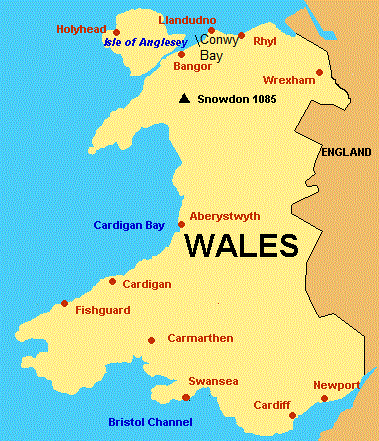
- Map, Conwy Bay shown in north
- Location: North West Wales
- Coordinates: 53°20′N 3°58′W
- Type: Bay and inlet
- Etymology: River Conwy
- Part of: Irish Sea
- Basin countries: United Kingdom

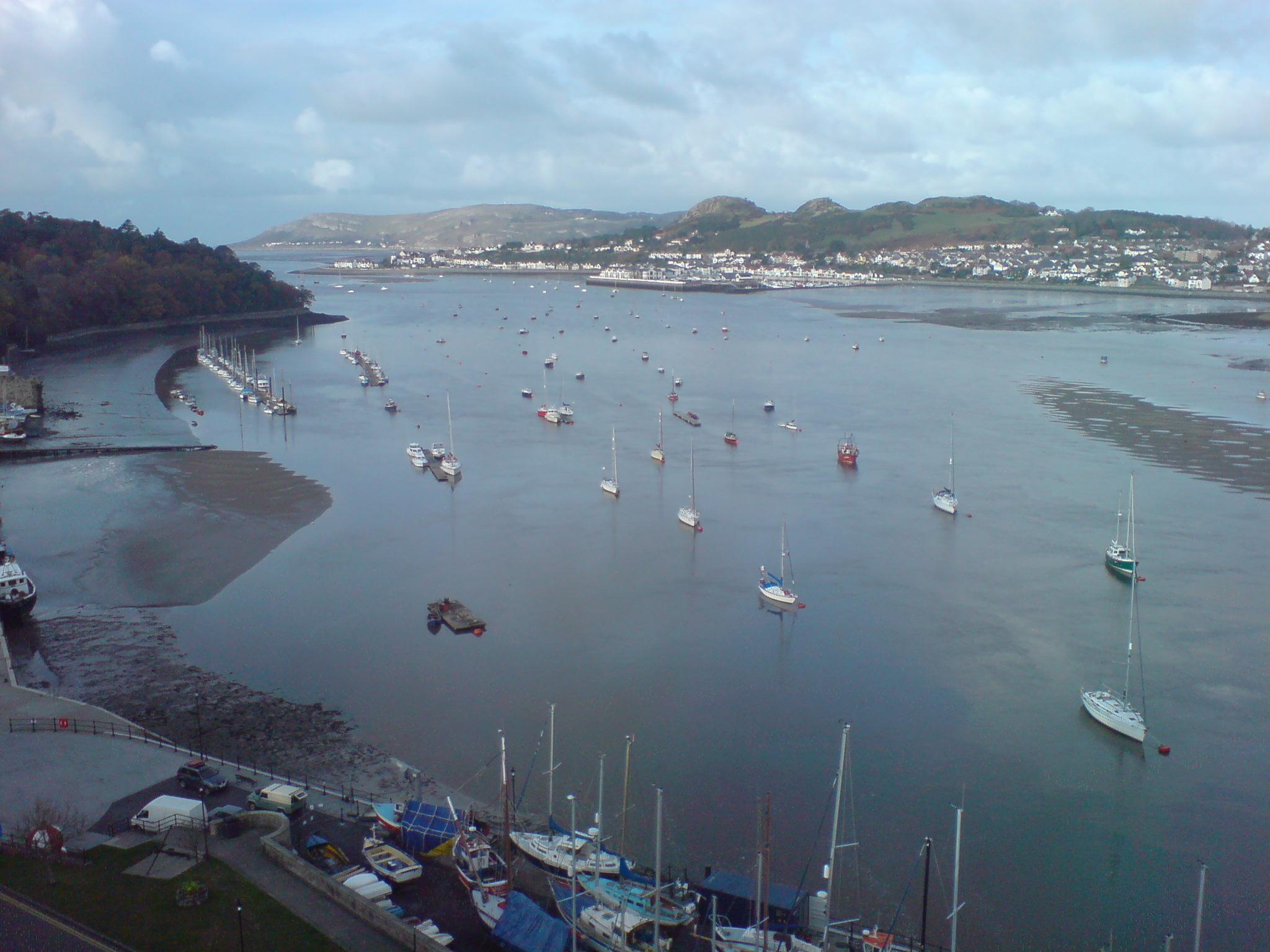
The harbour at Conwy

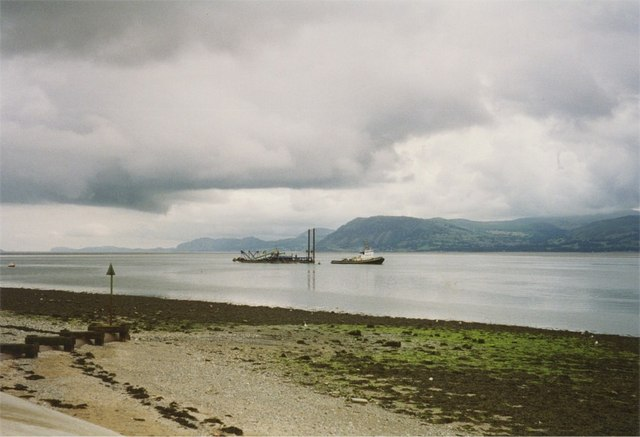
Conwy Bay

Conwy Bay (Welsh: Bae Conwy, also spelled as Conway Bay) is an inlet of the Irish Sea. It is situated at the southeastern point of the coast of Anglesey at Bangor on the northern central coast of Wales, stretching from Puffin Island to Great Orme in the northeast. Bangor, Penmaenmawr, Beaumaris and Llandudno are notable towns on the bay. With its onshore winds and ebbing tide, the bay is popular with yachtsmen; Conwy Yacht Club hosts an annual regatta in June.

== Description ==
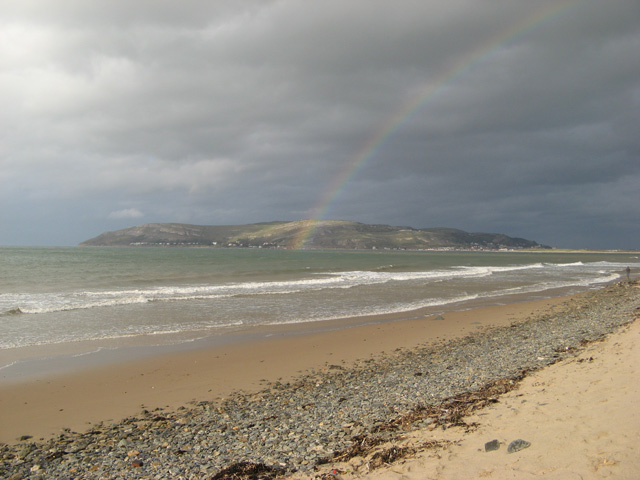
A rainbow over Conwy Bay

Conwy Bay lies at the southeastern point of the coast of Anglesey at Bangor on the northern central coast of Wales. Puffin Island and the Great Orme mark the limits of the bay. The bay is entered between Trwyn-du and Great Ormes Head in the northeast and extends for approximately 8 miles (13 km) to the southwest at Bangor, marking the northeast entrance to the Menai Strait.

Bangor, Penmaenmawr and Beaumaris lie on the bay, with Llandudno to the eastern extreme. The River Conwy flows into Conwy Bay in the southeast, while the Menai Strait in the west connects it to Caernarfon Bay.

The coastline at both sides of the bay is low. A considerable area of the bay is characterised by drying sands, Lavan Sands and the Dutchman Bank (Welsh: Banc Yr Hen Wyddeles) being the most prominents banks. To the west of the entrance at Great Ormes Head is the Four Fathom Bank, a shallow area with depths of under 6 metres (20 ft), though the dry Conwy Sands dominate much of the estuary area in the eastern part of the bay between Great Ormes Head and Penmaen-bach Point, 3 miles (4.8 km) to the south. 1.7 miles (2.7 km) to the east of Penmaen-bach Point is the entrance to the Conwy River. The outer estuary of the Conwy in the southeastern corner of Conwy Bay is marked by "extensive sandbanks, mudflats and mussel beds", and is an important habitat for birds such as dunlin, oystercatcher, curlew and redshank.

== Water sports ==
With its strong onshore winds and ebbing tide, the bay is popular with yachtsmen. The bay is home to several yacht and boating clubs. Conwy Yacht Club hosts an annual regatta in June, in preparation for the Conwy River Festival in July.
