= Afon Dulyn =

Tributary of River Conwy, Wales

Coordinates: 53.20326°N 3.83552°W

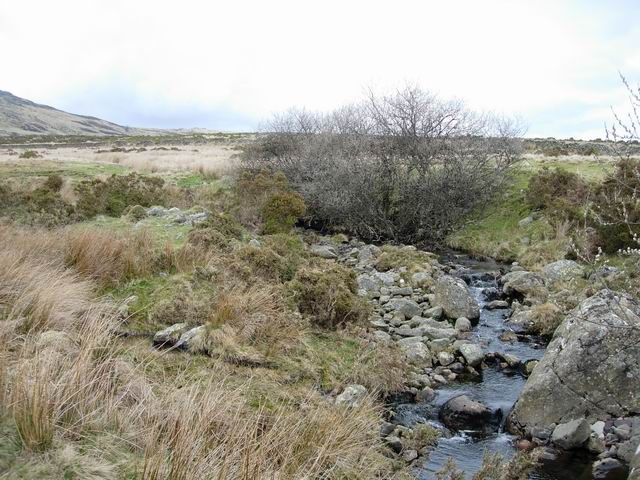
Afon Dulyn

Afon Dulyn (Welsh for 'River Dulyn') is the outflow from Llyn Dulyn, a lake in the Carneddau mountains in north-west Wales. It is a tributary of the river Conwy.

Just below Afon Dulyn the river is joined by Afon Melynllyn, a small river flowing from neighbouring Llyn Melynllyn.

The river does not carry a great deal of water because water is transferred from Llyn Dulyn to the reservoirs of Llyn Eigiau and Llyn Cowlyd.

== Ceunant Dulyn ==
Ceunant Dulyn, or the Dulyn Gorge, has been designated a Site of Special Scientific Interest (SSSI) since 1 January 1961 as a conservation measure to protect the site on account of its wildlife. Its area is 35.66 hectares. Natural Resources Wales is the body responsible for the site.
