= River Conwy =

River in north Wales

Coordinates: 53°18′N 3°50′W

Conwy Afon Conwy (Welsh)
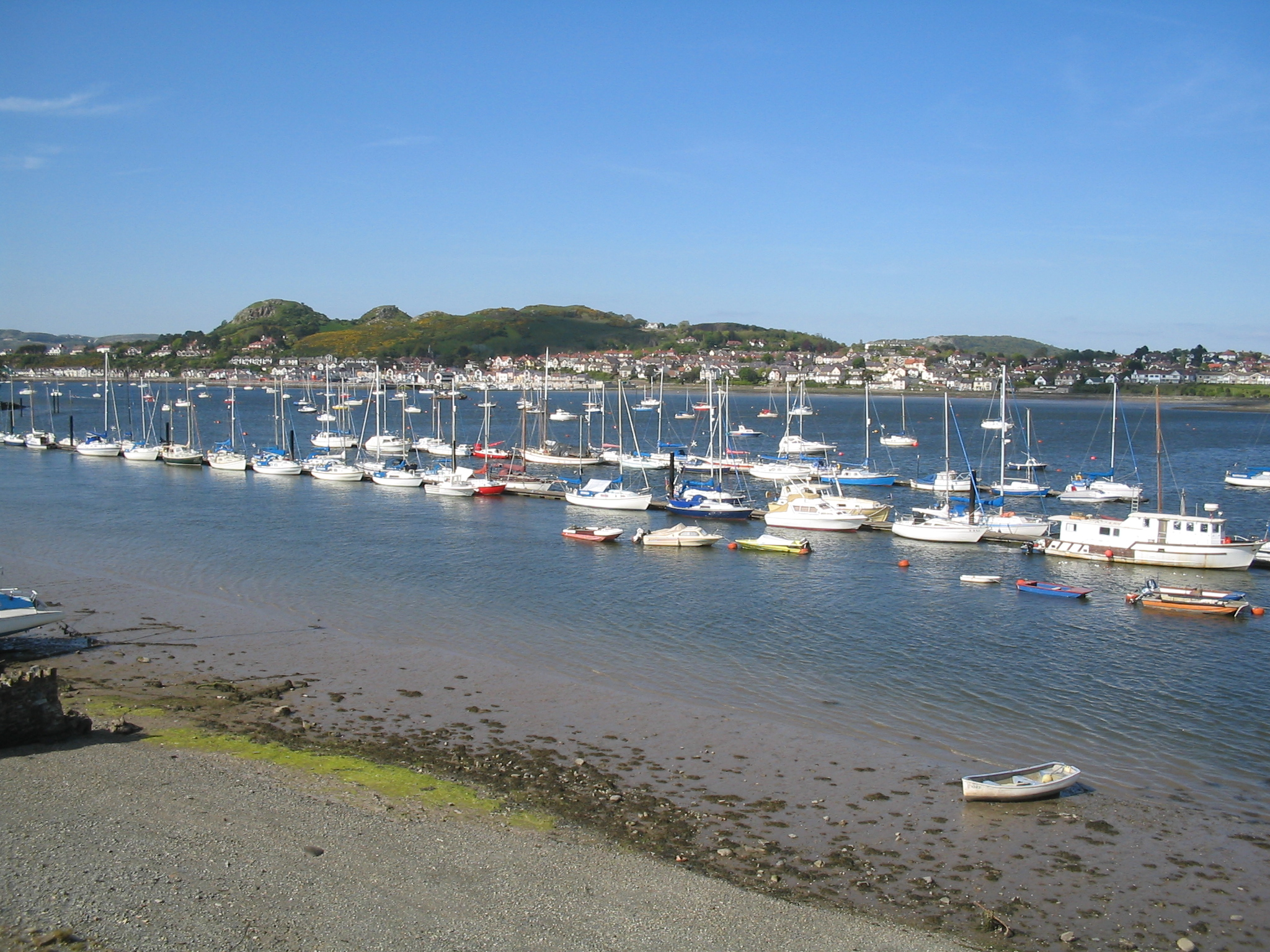
- Boats in the river estuary at Conwy

Location
- Country: Wales
- Principal area: Conwy County Borough
- Town: Conwy

Physical characteristics
- Source
  - location: Migneint moor where a number of small streams flow into Llyn Conwy, Gwynedd
- Mouth: Conwy estuary
  - location: Irish Sea, Wales
- Length: 34 mi (55 km)
- Discharge
  - location: Cwm Llanerch
  - average: 18.59 m^{3}/s (656 cu ft/s)

Basin features
- Tributaries
  - left: Machno, Lledr, Llugwy, Crafnant

The River Conwy (Welsh pronunciation: [ˈkɔnʊɨ]; Welsh: Afon Conwy) is a river in north Wales. From its source to its discharge in Conwy Bay it is 34 miles (55 km) long and drains an area of 262 square miles (678 km^{2}). "Conwy" was formerly anglicised as "Conway."

The name 'Conwy' derives from the old Welsh words cyn (chief) and gwy (water), the river being originally called the 'Cynwy'.

It rises on the Migneint moor where a number of small streams flow into Llyn Conwy, then flows in a generally northern direction, being joined by the tributaries of the rivers Machno and Afon Lledr before reaching Betws-y-coed, where it is also joined by Llugwy. From Betws-y-coed the river continues to flow north through Llanrwst, Trefriw (where it is joined by the Afon Crafnant) and Dolgarrog (where it is joined by Afon Porth-llwyd and Afon Ddu) before reaching Conwy Bay at Conwy. A local quay, Cei Cae Gwyn, is located on its bank. During spring tides the river is tidal as far as Tan-lan, near Llanrwst.

== Tributaries of the River Conwy ==
This is a list of named tributaries of the Conwy (and their tributaries) listed from source to sea;

- River Machno at Conwy Falls
- Afon Lledr near Betws-y-coed
- River Llugwy at Betws-y-coed
- Afon Gallt y Gwg
- Nant y Goron at Llanrwst
- Afon Crafnant & Fairy Falls at Trefriw
  - River Geirionydd
- Afon Ddu (1) at Dolgarrog
- Afon Porth-llwyd at Dolgarrog
- Afon Dulyn at Tal-y-bont
  - Afon Ddu (2)
  - Afon Garreg-wen
  - Ffrwd Cerriguniawn
  - Afon Melynllyn
- Afon Hiraethlyn near Tal-y-cafn
- Afon Roe near Llanbedr-y-Cennin
  - Afon Tafolog
- Afon Gyffin at Conwy

== Geology and geomorphology ==
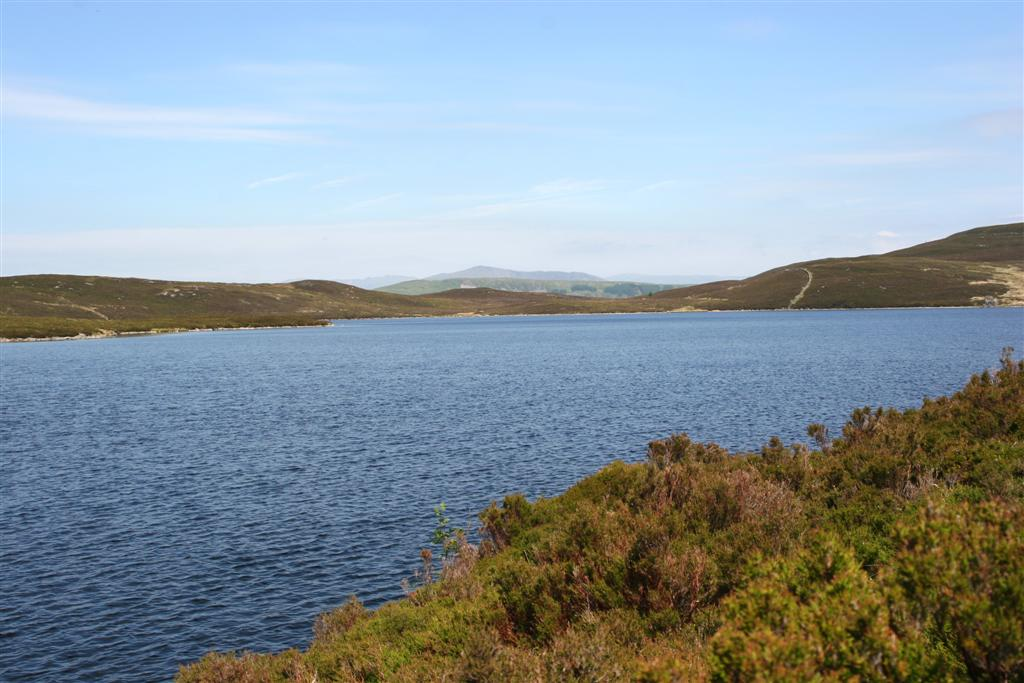
Llyn Conwy, the source of the River Conwy

The Conwy is bounded to the east by the rolling ancient mudstone hills of the Silurian period, the Migneint Moors. These acid rocks are generally covered in thin, often acid soils and for large parts of the upland areas the cover is of moor grass – Mollinia spp and Erica communities. As a result, the water entering the river tends to be acidic and often coloured brown with humic acids.

To the west, the catchment is underlain by older Cambrian rocks which are harder and the landscape is, as a consequence, more dramatic with high craggy hills and mountains, through which the river falls in cascades and waterfalls. Examples of torrential river geomorphology can be seen at Conwy Falls and in the Lledr Gorge. The land to the east is highly forested with planted non-native conifers.

On the western side of the valley are a number of lakes and reservoirs. The rocks are also rich in minerals and there are many abandoned mine sites where copper, lead and silver have been mined since Roman times.

The river valley downstream of Betws-y-coed is relatively wide and fertile, and supports dairying and sheep rearing. In the winter, these pastures are used to nurture the sheep brought down from the mountains to avoid the worst of the winter weather.

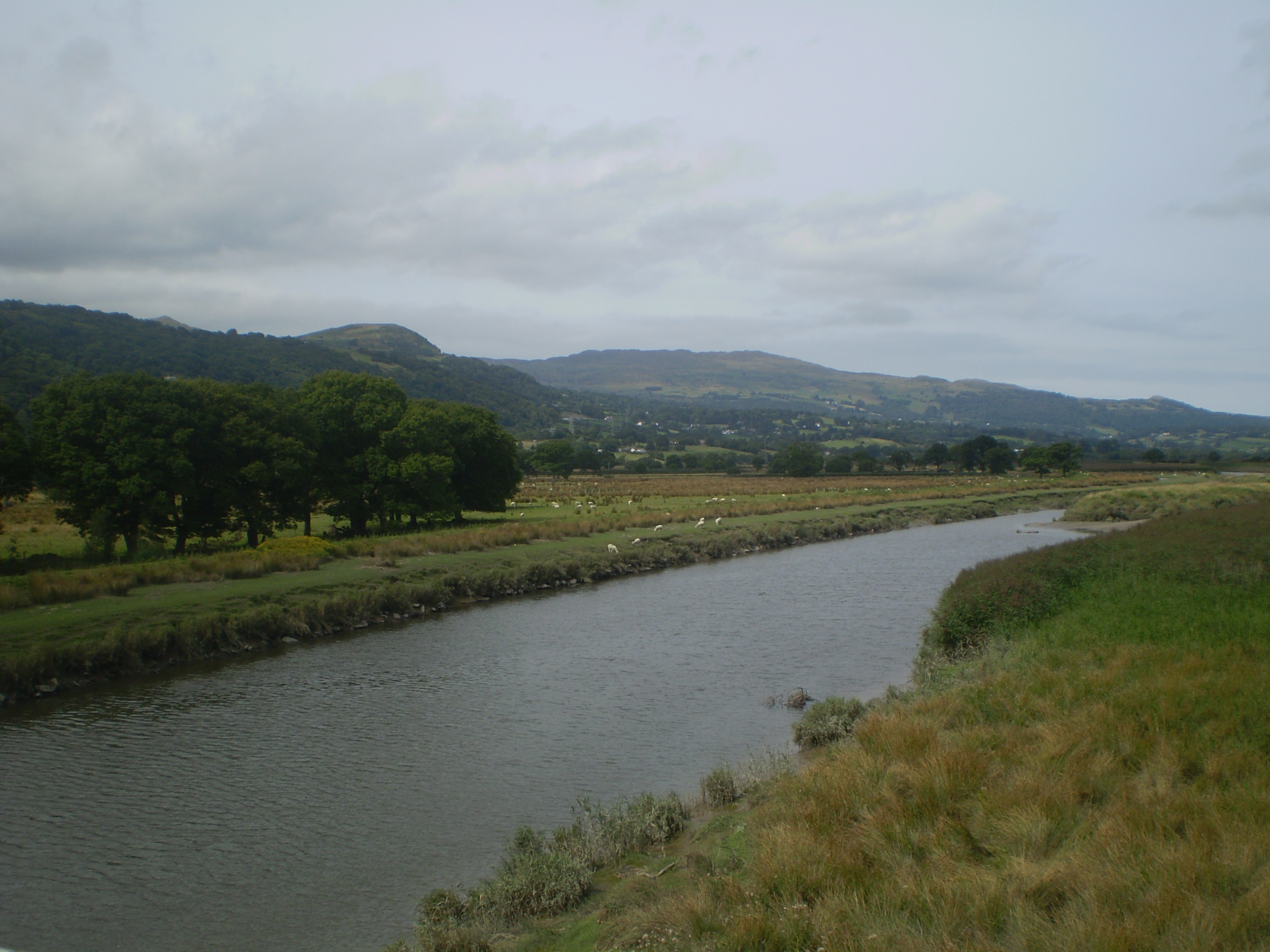
River Conwy near Dolgarrog

== SSSI ==
Aber Afon Conwy is a site of special interest. It has acquired such a status due to its marine and terrestrial biology. The tidal reach of the site is around 10 miles (16 km). Its upstream boundary is south of Tal y Cafn, and the whole site encompasses Conwy Bay. The shoreline is supported by natural rock, in addition to boulder clay cliff, sand dune, salt marsh and woodland.

== Culture and history ==
The scattered communities along the Conwy valley have ancient traditions with archaeological evidence of habitation back to the Stone Age. The Romans occupied this area up to 400 AD and there has been continuous habitation since that time. The valley is home to two of the oldest churches in Wales, those at Llanrhychwyn and Llangelynnin, which respectively date back to the 11th and 12th centuries.

Much of the Conwy valley was laid waste in the Wars of the Roses by the Earl of Pembroke, under the orders of Edward IV, the Yorkist king, following a Lancastrian attack on the town of Denbigh in 1466.

At the mouth of the Conwy as it discharges into Conwy Bay is the town of Conwy with its World Heritage Site castle – Conwy Castle and two famous bridges. One of the earliest suspension bridges by Thomas Telford now carries a footpath whilst Robert Stephenson's tubular iron bridge still carries the main Holyhead to London railway line. A third bridge now takes road traffic, and more recently still the A55 now runs in a tunnel under the estuary.

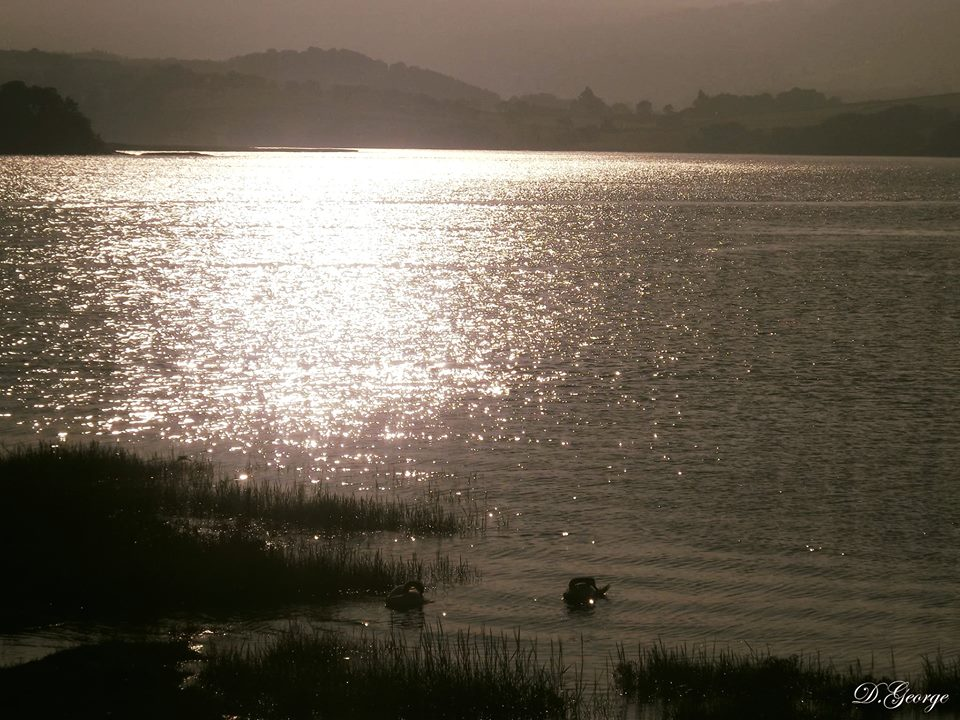
The River Conwy by Glan Conwy Railway Station

== Water quality ==
Neither the River Conwy or its tributaries are monitored for quality by Natural Resources Wales. The river is routinely polluted by Dŵr Cymru sewage treatment plants and agricultural runoff. Algae blooms are common during the summer months. The river quality tends to be acidic in the headwaters with very low concentrations of the common anions and cations.

Natural Resources Wales monitors water levels in the valley, with a view to giving flood warnings. There are measuring stations at Betws-y-coed (Cwmlanerch), Llanrwst and Trefriw.

The Conwy is noted for its salmon and sea trout, although increasing acidification in the second half of the 20th century, especially in the poorly buffered upland waters has significantly impacted upon their spawning success. The construction of an artificial fish pass in the 1990s to allow migratory salmonids access to the river above Conwy falls was intended to help mitigate the effects of acidification.

The Conwy Crossing, an immersed tube tunnel, was built under the estuary during the late 1980s and early 1990s. It was opened by the Queen in October 1991. This resulted in the loss of some saltmarsh but also led to the creation of Conwy RSPB Reserve.

Since 2002 the valley has been overlooked by the turbines of the Moel Maelogan wind farm.

== Situation ==
The panorama shows the mouth of the Conwy Estuary from Deganwy Castle, the original defensive position of the area. However, problems with resupply in the event of siege and its destruction by Llywelyn ap Gruffudd, Prince of Wales in 1263 to prevent it falling into King Edward's hands, led to a new castle being built across the water in Conwy town.

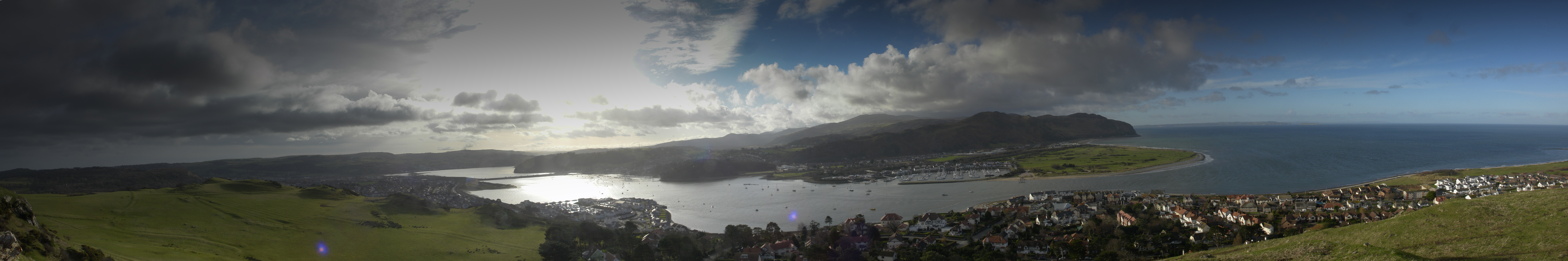
Panorama of six pictures stitched together showing the mouth of the Conwy Estuary (right) and the location of Conwy Castle (left of centre)

== See also ==
- Conwy Valley Line (railway line)
- List of crossings of the River Conwy
- Rivers of Great Britain
- List of rivers of Europe
