= Carnedd y Ddelw =

Hill in Gwynedd, Wales

Coordinates: 53.20682°N 3.93595°W

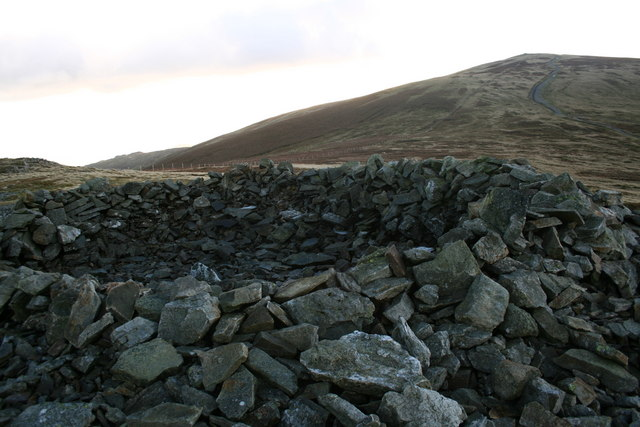
- Carnedd y Ddelw summit carin with Drum (Wales) behind. Pen y Castell can be seen in middle of image.

Highest point
- Elevation: 686 m (2,251 ft)
- Prominence: 14 m (46 ft)
- Listing: Former Nuttall

Naming
- Language of name: Welsh

Geography
- Location: Conwy / Gwynedd, Wales
- Parent range: Snowdonia
- OS grid: SH708695

Carnedd y Ddelw is a summit in the Carneddau mountains in north Wales, north-east of Foel-fras. It a former Nuttall top of Drum (Wales), having been resurveyed. Its eastern slopes are drained by the Afon Tafolog, a tributary of Afon Roe that flows through the village of Rowen before joining the River Conwy. It is also the final top on Carnedd Llewelyn's long northern spur. To the north-east is Tal y Fan, the most northerly 2000 foot tall mountain in the Carneddau and Wales. The summit has two large shelter cairns, hollowed out from a large Bronze Age burial cairn.
