= Caer Bach =

Hillfort near Rowen, Conwy, Wales

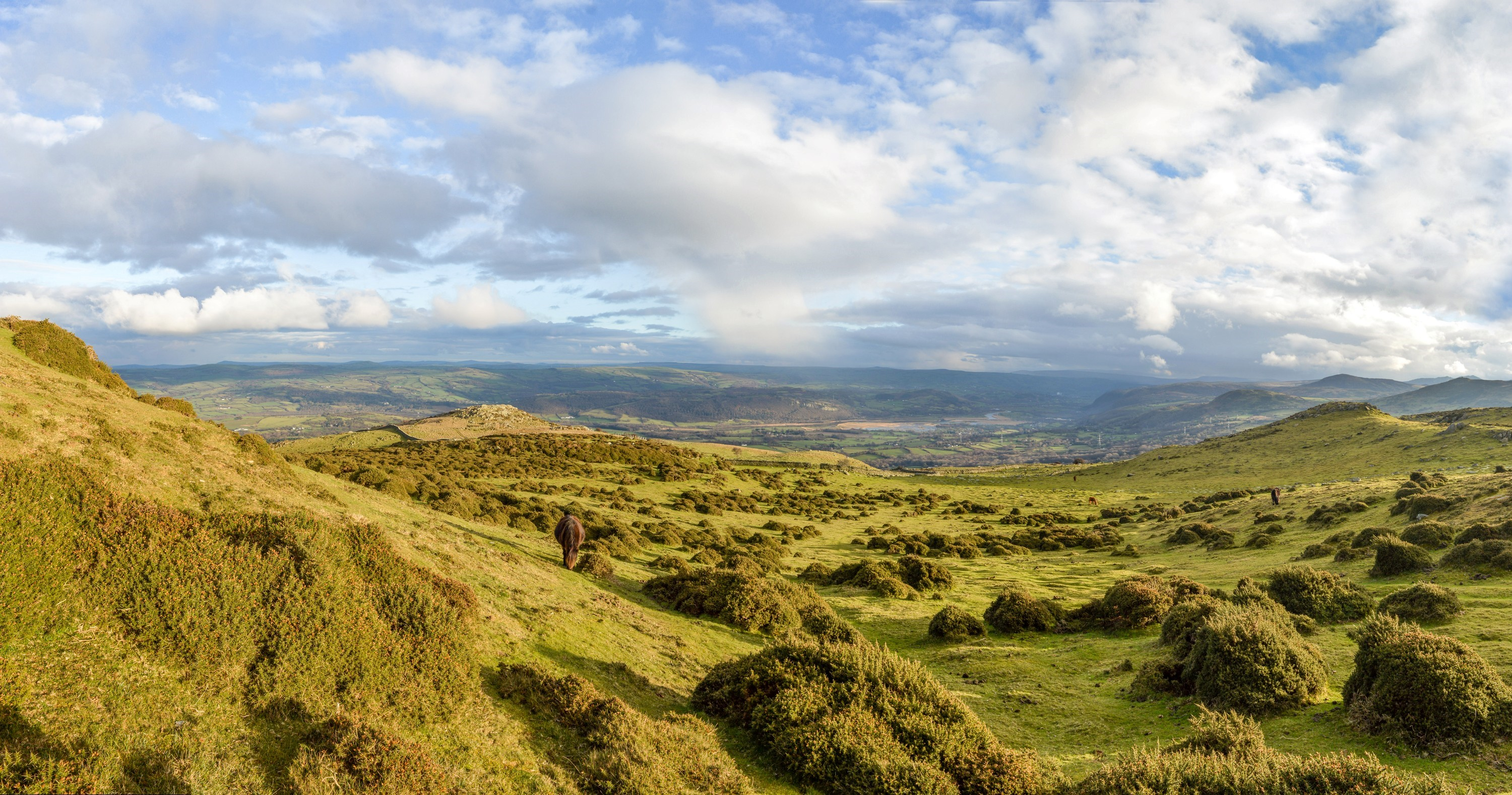
- Caer Bach in its situation above the Conwy Valley

- Caer Bach shown within Conwy
- 53.23881469°N 3.88313994°W
- Type: Hillfort
- Periods: Prehistoric

Site notes
- Material: Stone, earth
- Elevation: 413 m (1,355 ft)
- Diameter: 38 m (125 ft)
- Condition: Rampart, good; Wall, robbed.
- Management: Cadw
- Public access: Yes

Caer Bach is a Welsh hillfort of indeterminate age, on a rounded hillock situated near the village of Rowen in Conwy County Borough, North Wales. Its name in English translates as 'Small Fort'; or alternatively 'Little Fortress'. It is situated on the Eastern slopes of Tal-y-Fan, an outlying peak of the Carneddau mountain range in northeast Snowdonia; at an altitude of approximately 413 metres (1,355 feet). Little information is known about the history of the fort, as to date, the site has undergone minimal investigation. The fort is classed as a scheduled ancient monument and is of national importance for its potential to enhance our knowledge of prehistoric settlement. It is said to retain significant archaeological potential, with a strong probability of the presence of associated archaeological features and deposits.

== Description ==
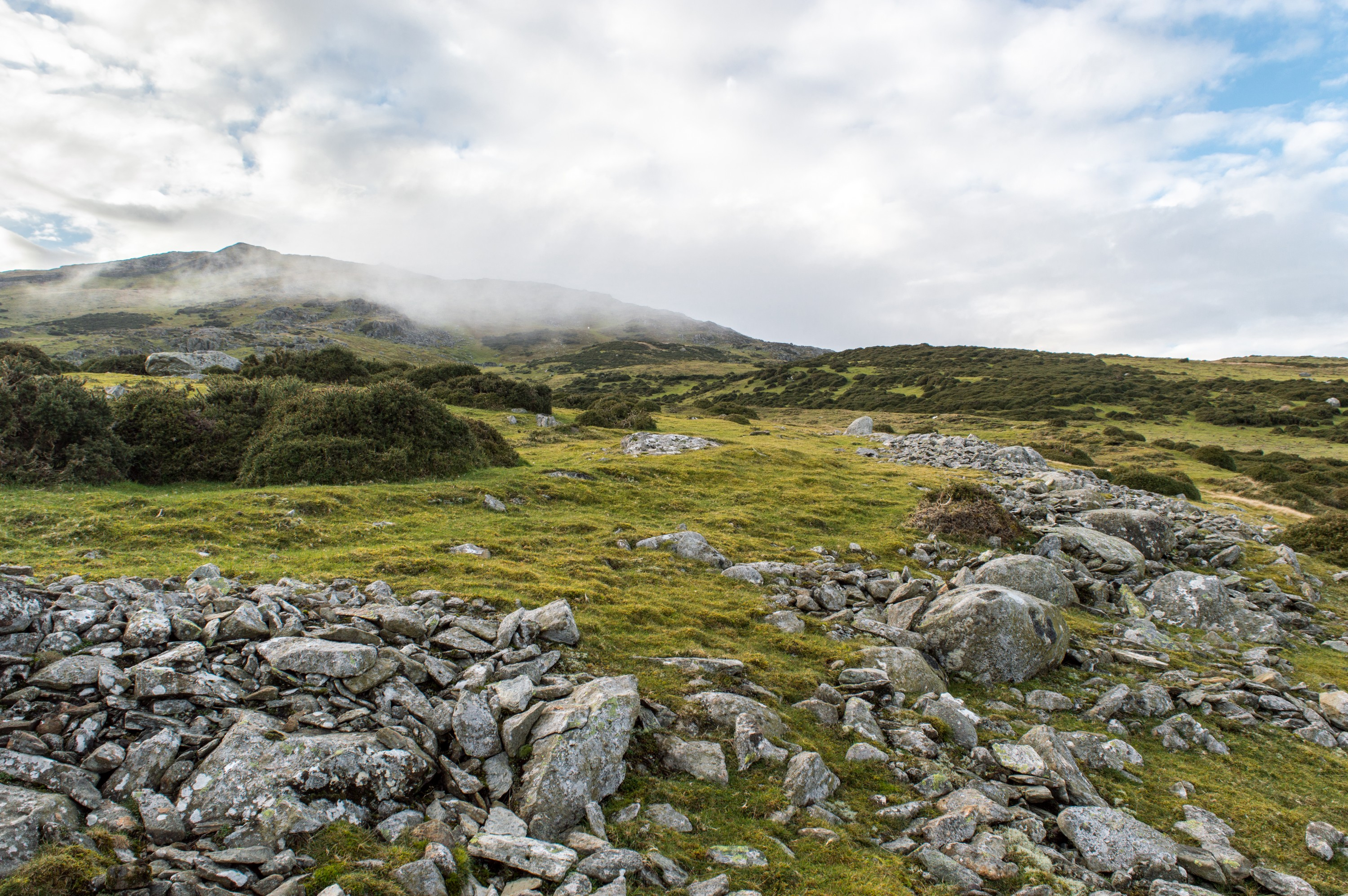
Remains of a stone wall at Caer Bach, looking NW towards the Eastern slopes of Tal-y-Fan.

The Royal Commission on the Ancient and Historical Monuments of Wales describes the site as follows:

"Caer Bach, a small hill-fort at about 1,300ft above O.D. The end of a spur projecting E. from Tal y Fan rises slightly to form a rounded hillock, which is encircled by two roughly circular lines of defence. The outer is a bank of earth with an external ditch, which survives to a total height of about 10ft. A stone revetment of laid masonry can be traced on the N.W. outer face, and a slight counterscarp bank on the S. The E. side merges into the natural slope. Separated from this rampart by about 50ft. are the footings of a stone wall, much robbed, about 12–15 feet thick, built in short straight lengths. The facing, where it survives, is generally of large blocks set on their longer edges. There entrances through both ramparts were on the S.E., but are much ruined. A hut circle and be traced against the inner face of the N.W. side of the inner enclosure."

The site has been identified as a partial contour fort, unusual for its poorly defensible position within the wider landscape, and also for its small size. The fort has broad views over the Conwy valley and it has been speculated that its position is related to a prehistoric trackway, which ran from the mouth of the River Conwy, through to the mountain pass at Bwlch-y-Ddeufaen. Minimal investigations into the site mean that no dating evidence has been made available.

== The wider landscape ==
Thirty yards southwest of the fort are the remains of a round hut, about 24 feet in diameter and cut into the slope on the northeast and dating from the Iron Age / Roman period (Grid ref: SH74377292).

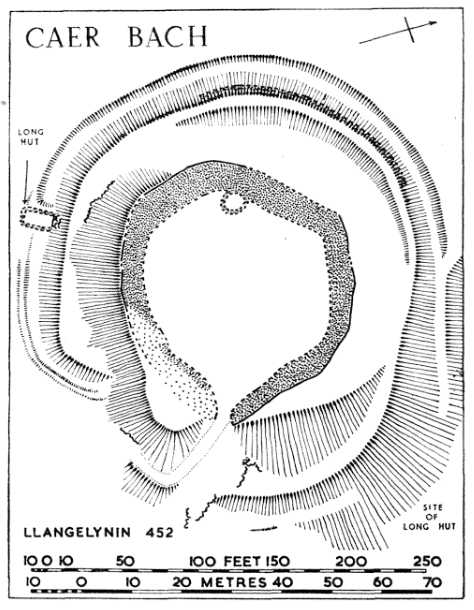
Plan of Caer Bach.

The Royal Commission on the Ancient and Historical Monuments of Wales also notes the remnants of three Bronze Age cairns to the south-west of the fort. The cairns are described as surviving in 'very poor' condition, being 'circular mounds of earth and stones', the tallest of which rises 1 foot, 6 inches above the ground, with a diameter of 18 feet. (Grid ref: SH74297259)

== Access ==
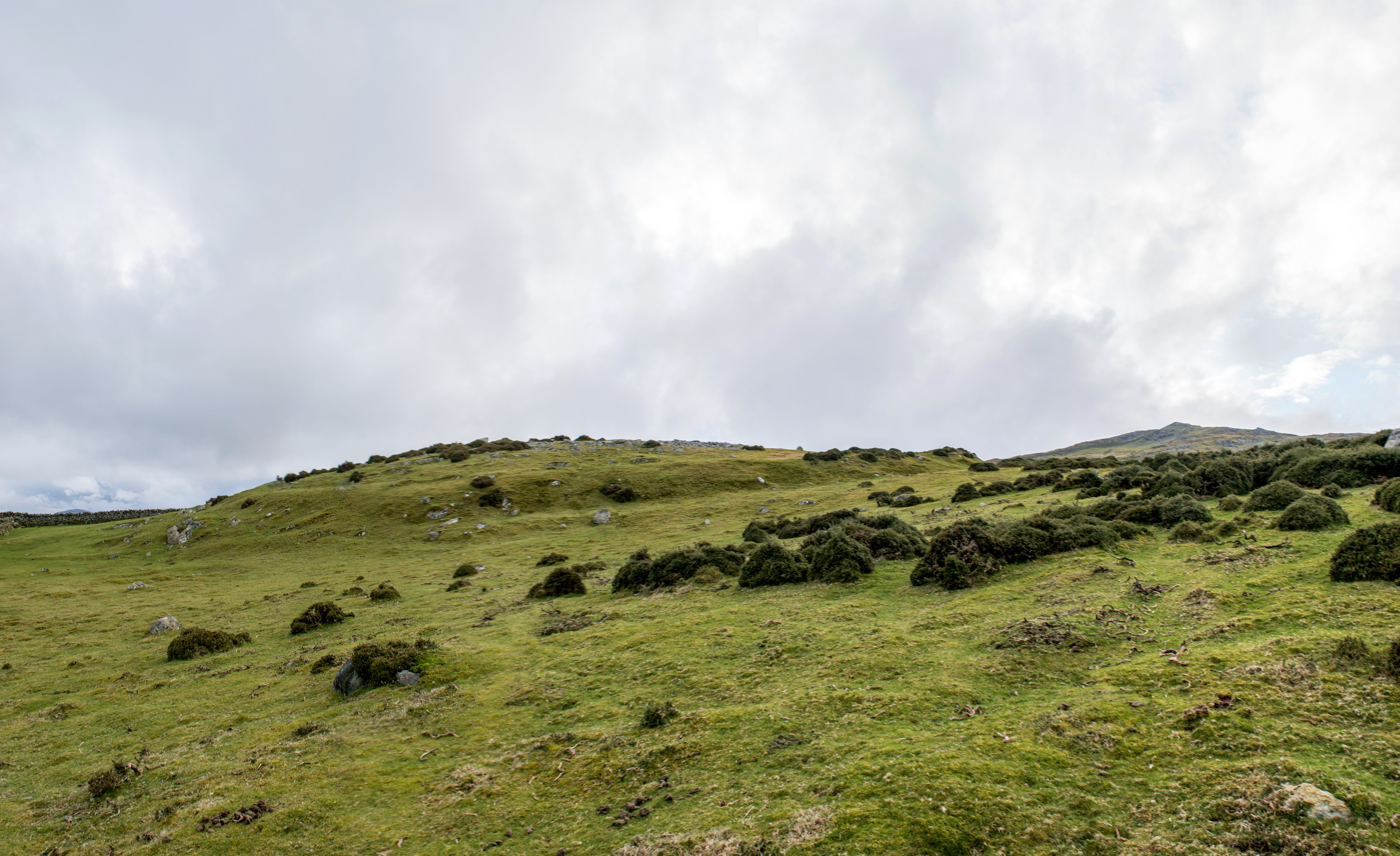
Defensive ditch running along the NE boundary of Caer Bach.

The fort is in quite a remote, hilly area; and access necessarily involves at least a little walking over some uneven, upland terrain. The quickest route is to drive up to Llangelynin church via a narrow road that leads through Henryd, utilise the small car park and make your way on foot to the fort, using the public footpath which forms a small part of the North Wales Pilgrim's Way as it runs West past the church, before bearing South towards the fort. The church is not named on the Ordnance Survey map, but lies at reference SH751737.

An alternate route by car, is to park in the public car park at Bwlch-y-Ddeufaen and follow the line of the old Roman road past Cae Coch farm, before leaving the track to take the public footpath which runs in a north-easterly direction, and leads directly to the fort. This route will take you very near to the Bronze Age burial chamber, 'Maen-y-Bardd' (see link below for further details).

Public footpaths converge on the site from all directions. The fort itself sits near the South-Eastern border of a large area of Open Access land, designated "Open Common".

== Nearby prehistoric sites ==
Whilst the area is full of prehistoric remains, some nearby, but by no means exhaustive sites of note are:

- (SH75427395) Cerrig-y-Ddinas, Iron Age hillfort.
- (SH74067178) Maen-y-Bardd, a Neolithic burial chamber, believed to have been constructed around 3500 BC.
- (SH74127188) Burial Chamber, near Maen-y-Bardd.
- (SH73907357) Maen Penddu, standing stone, near Tal-y-Fan quarry.
- (SH71517177) Bronze Age standing stones & cairn at Bwlch-y-Ddeufaen.
- (SH72457132) Cerrig Pryfaid, stone circle.
