= Afon Aber =

River in Gwynedd, Wales

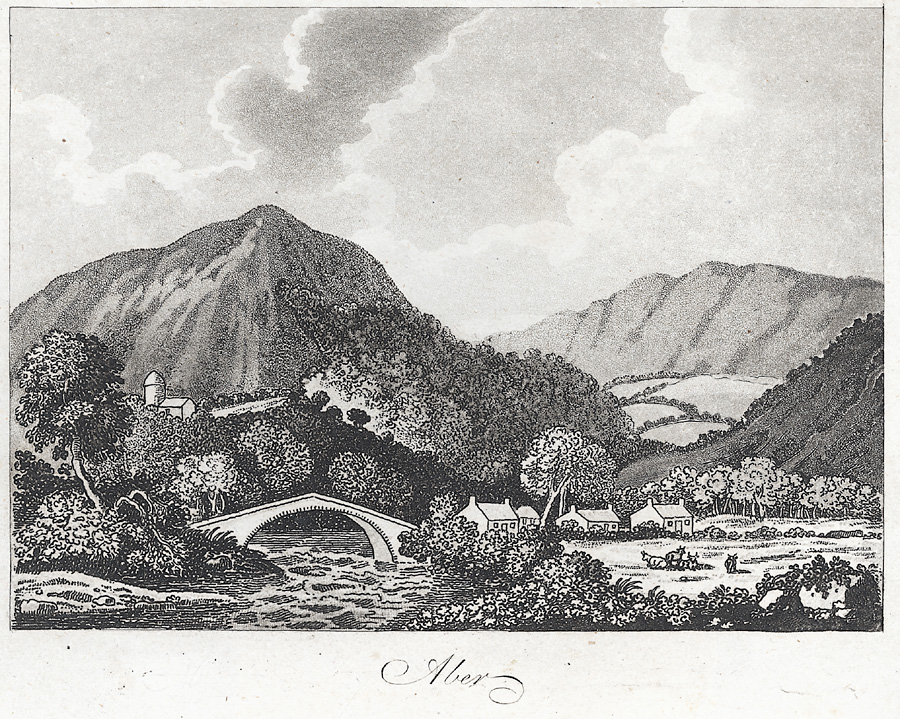
Sketch showing a bridge over the Afon Aber, mountains and cottages

The Afon Aber is a small river in Gwynedd that enters Liverpool Bay on the coast of North Wales at Abergwyngregyn, 53.242°N 4.027°W. It rises in the Carneddau mountains on the northern watersheds of Drum, Foel Fras and Garnedd Uchaf and the eastern watersheds of Drosgl and Moel Wnion. It is principally noted for the spectacular waterfall of one of its principal tributaries, the Aber Falls, where it leaves the hills and descends in a single drop to the valley floor. The river, joined by the other main tributary, the Afon Anafon, then flows through a densely wooded valley which is now a nature reserve before entering the sea just north of Abergwyngregyn.
