= Huw T. Edwards =

Welsh trade union leader and politician

Huw Thomas Edwards

Chair of the Council for Wales and Monmouthshire
- In office 1949–1958

Personal details
- Born: 19 November 1892 Rowen
- Died: 8 November 1970 (aged 77) Abergele
- Spouse: Margaret Owen

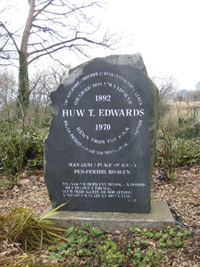
Monument to Huw T Edwards at Ro-wen

Huw Thomas Edwards MBE (19 November 1892 – 8 November 1970) was a Welsh trade union leader and politician.

== Early life ==
Edwards was born in Rowen near the top of Tal-y-fan Mountain, North Wales. He was the youngest of seven children, all of whom could speak only Welsh. Edwards' father was a quarryman who grew up with no education, being taught how to read and write by Edward's mother. She died when Edwards was eight, after a period of poor health. After her death, the family moved and Edwards' father remarried within a year. From the age of ten, Edwards went to the quarry at Penmaenmawr with his father, at least during his holidays from school. He soon began to start working on a farm in Talybont near Bangor, where one of his brothers also worked.

Even before he was eighteen, Edwards left for Tonypandy in the South Wales coalfields. He travelled by rail, via Chester, and became aware of the urban, English, middle-class world outside of North Wales. When he arrived in Trealaw, he found lodgings and a job as a dustman on the night shift at Clydach Vale No. 2 Pit in the Rhondda mines. Working at the mines, Edwards became familiar with various English-speaking migrants, and quickly picked up the language. Before Edwards arrived in the area, his cousin had been one of ten people killed in an explosion at Clydach Vale. Another cousin, with whom Edwards had become close friends, was killed in the Senghenydd colliery disaster: Edwards was a member of one of the rescue parties that recovered bodies, following the explosion. Edwards joined the South Wales Miners' Federation (known as the Fed), but did not always involve himself with strike action.

== Military service and early career ==
Edwards went away to fight in August 1914, at the age of twenty-one. He returned from the Western Front in March 1918, severely wounded and made to spend months in hospital. In September 1918, he was discharged and spent the last weeks of the war teaching gas drill to new recruits. After returning to civilian life on 10 December 1918, he stayed in Aberfan for a week, before returning to Penmaenmawr quarry. He joined the Workers' Union and the Independent Labour Party. After representing the quarry workers in a case of pay, Edwards joined the Dockers' Union in around 1920, leaving the Amalgamated Union of Quarryworkers and Steelworkers, which represented most quarry workers. Edwards was dismissed from his job at the quarry, due to refusing to rejoin the quarryworkers' union after strike action.

In 1923, Edwards became secretary of the Penmaenmawr branch of the Transport and General Workers' Union, which allowed him to meet with other union leaders. In 1927, he was elected to Penmaenmawr council.

== Later career ==
He was appointed the first chair of the Council for Wales and Monmouthshire in 1949. He was in favour of a Welsh Parliament but initially did not support the Parliament for Wales Campaign in the early 1950s although later he did join the campaign. He opposed the decision to flood the Tryweryn valley to create a reservoir to service Liverpool. In 1956 he bought the Welsh-language periodical, Y Faner, in order to save it from liquidation. In 1958 he resigned from the Council for Wales and in 1959 he left the Labour Party to join Plaid Cymru although he returned to the Labour fold in 1965. He was the first President of the Welsh Language Society.

He published two autobiographical volumes in his native Welsh, Tros y Tresi (1956) and Troi'r Drol (1963). He was also a poet.

== Personal life ==
In March 1920, Edwards married Margaret Owen, a Welsh-speaking woman from Rachub, Bethesda, Gwynedd. They had known each other since Edwards was a boy, as she was his sister's best friend.
