= Anafon River =

River in Gwynedd, Wales

Coordinates: 53°13′36″N 4°00′14″W

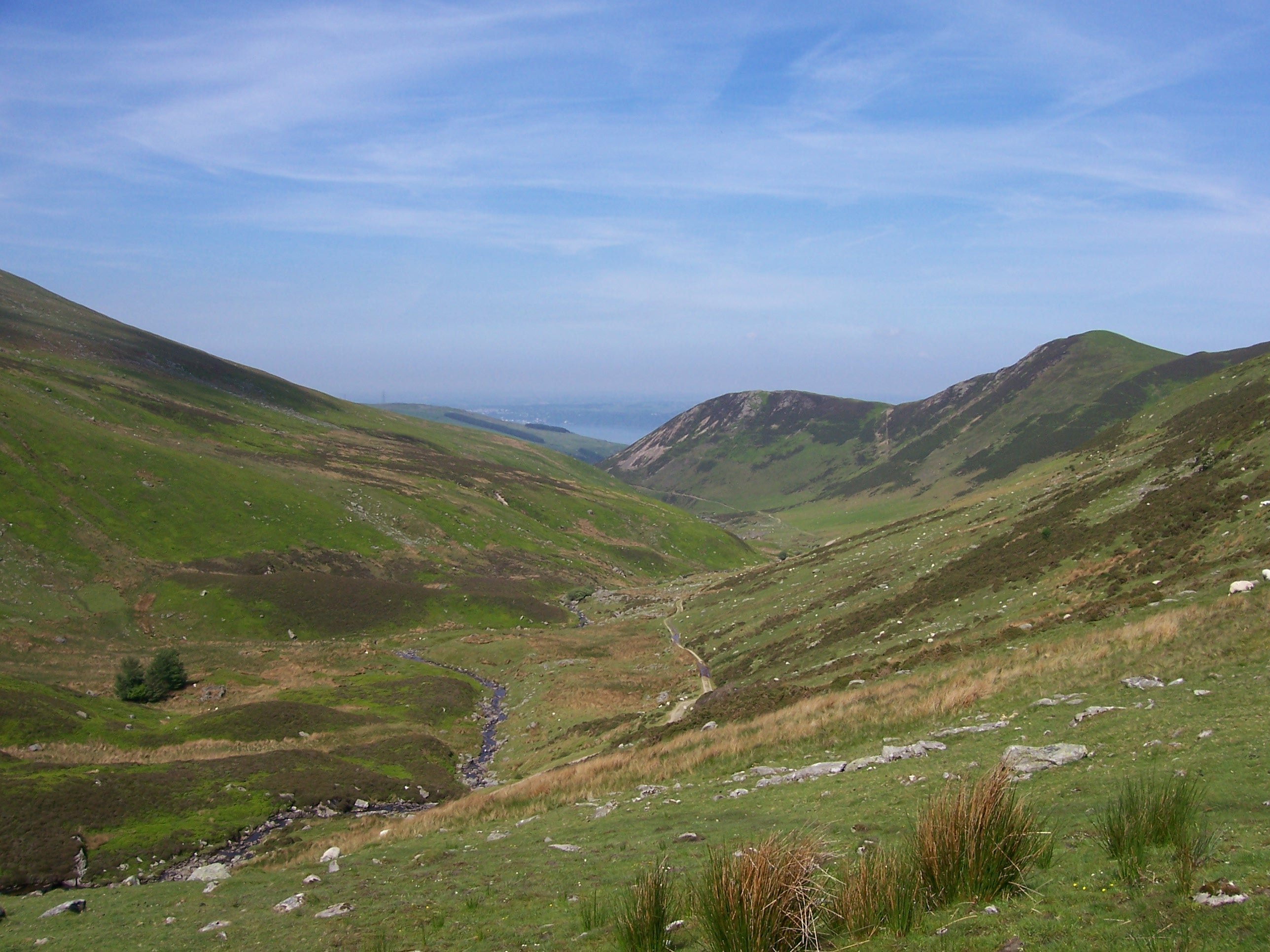
River Anafon

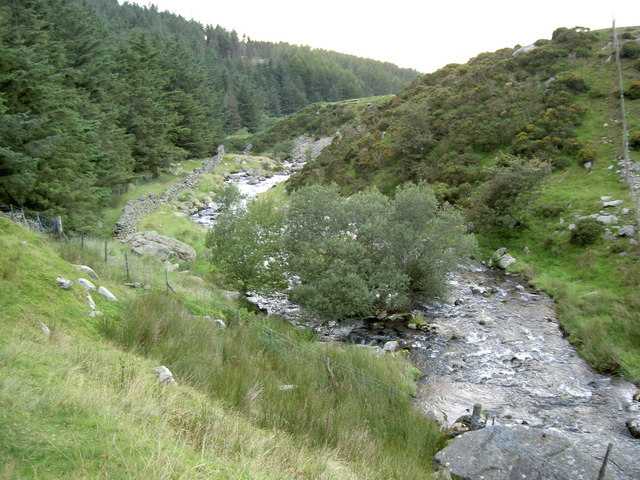
Lowest part of River Anafon

The River Anafon, or Afon Anafon, is a river in Gwynedd, Wales, that flows into the Afon Aber.

It originates on the slopes of Foel-fras and Drum in the Carneddau. It flows into Glyn Anafon, then north-west along the Anafon Valley, flowing past monuments of the Iron Age and the Bronze Age. It joins with the Aber Estuary just above the New Bridge, the bridge over the river on the way to the back of Abergwyngregyn.
