= Afon Roe =

Small river in Snowdonia, Wales

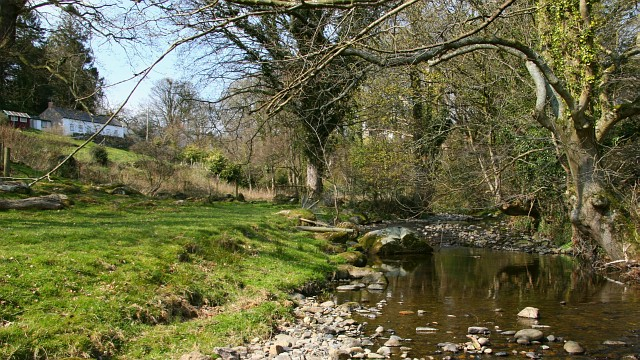

- Location of the mouth in Wales

Location
- Country: Wales
- Principal area: Conwy County Borough

Physical characteristics
- Mouth: Confluence with River Conwy
  - coordinates: 53.2120°N 3.8303°W

Afon Roe is a small river in Snowdonia, north-west Wales.

Its tributary is Afon Tafolog, which drains the eastern slopes of Drum, a mountain in the Carneddau range.

The river flows through the village of Rowen before joining the River Conwy.

== Course ==
The river originates from several small streams on the southern slopes of Tal y Fan, to the east of Bwlch-y-Ddeufaen. The highest of these streams originates approximately 480 meters up just south of the western summit of Tal y Fan. Other streams come from a little to the east and flow close to the old Poet's Stone (Maen y Bard). After following a southern course they join to form the river Ro. The Tafolog river, which gathers a number of mountain streams in the marshland near Bwlch y Deufaen, joins the river which then flows on a course in a north-eastern direction.

It flows through the village of Rowen and then makes a turn to flow in a southern direction. It goes under a bridge and past the village of Caerhun. It turns east again passing the site of the Roman fort of Canovium to flow into the River Conwy at the end.
