= Pen y Bryn =

Welsh manor house in Gwynedd; former royal estate

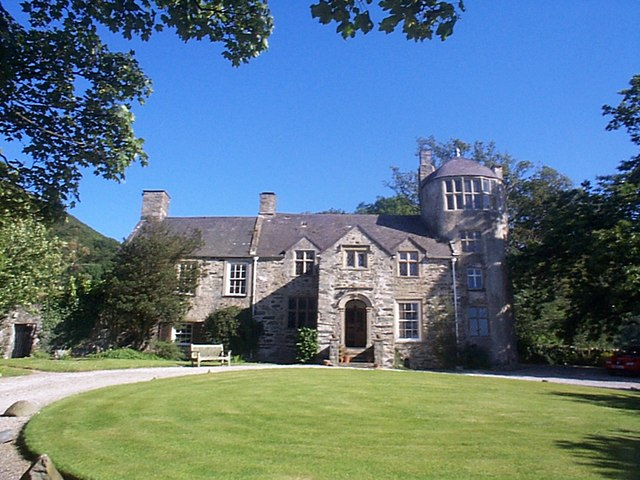

General information
- Type: Manor House
- Location: Abergwyngregyn, Aber, in Gwynedd, north Wales
- Coordinates: 53.234676°N 4.011712°W
- Construction started: before the early 1600s

Pen y Bryn is a two-storey manor house, in Abergwyngregyn, Gwynedd, in north-west Wales, adjacent to the A55, five miles east of Bangor and eight miles west of Conwy. It is constructed mainly of broken stone, with roughly dressed quoins and a slate roof. The house is situated within Garth Celyn, a double bank and ditch, overlooking the Menai Strait to Anglesey. A smaller house was immediately adjacent in 1811 when Sir Richard Colt-Hoare recorded it; this was demolished by 1815. The present structure incorporates a four-storey stone tower. The present roof timbers were dated by dendrochronology to 1624, when the house was refurbished. There is evidence of long use with multiple rebuildings before 1624, but there is disagreement on the duration and nature of its mediaeval use.

== Construction history ==
In 1303–06 building works at "Aber" were carried out on a large scale, including the importation of broken stone and of lime for mortar. The remains of the other candidate for such work, the high-status early mediaeval site, on and near the mound known as the Mŵd, do not now have masonry of broken stone and may not have been large enough to justify the quantities of material recorded. In 1553 Rhys Thomas and his wife Jane acquired the house from the Crown. The present roof timbers were felled between 1619 and 1624. The tower may be a slightly later addition, and there were further additions in the early eighteenth and nineteenth centuries.

== Garth Celyn ==
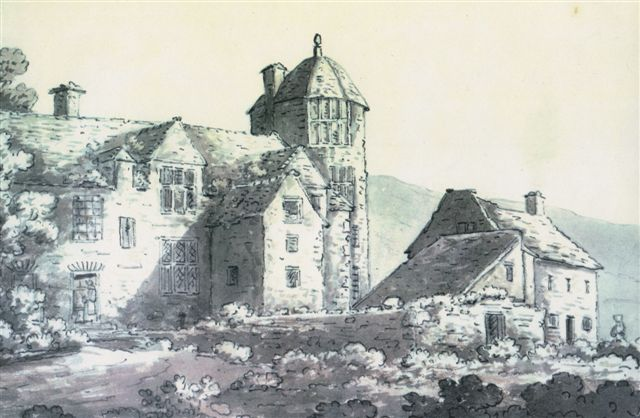
Pen y Bryn in 1811, sepia drawing by Sir Richard Colt-Hoare

The modern Garth Celyn is defined by the Royal Commission on the Ancient and Historical Monuments of Wales (RCAHMW) as a series of features, including the house Pen y Bryn itself, a large 'barn', and earthen terraces and scarps, collectively interpreted as an enclosure 90–100 metres across. The name "Garth Celyn" may be translated as "Holly Enclosure" or "Holly Hill" in Welsh. The use of the term "Aber Garthcelyn" has changed through time; as late as 1725, it could refer to the entire parish.

Modern Garth Celyn has designated a scheduled monument by Cadw due to being 'a site of national importance'. An excavation was undertaken in 1993 by the Gwynedd Archaeological Trust. The complex included other structures, including a barn or gatehouse (possibly rebuilt about 1700 on earlier stonework) and the present tower.

== Claims that the early mediaeval royal palace was located on this site ==
The Garth Celyn Trust exists to "protect and preserve Garth Celyn for the benefit of present and future generation (sic), to create a lasting memorial to the Princes and their achievements". The Trust identifies modern Garth Celyn as the site of the royal llys (palace) in the 13th century and the centre of government before the Conquest, and suggests that many notable events in Welsh history occurred here. There are local traditions pointing to Pen y Bryn / modern Garth Celyn / Bryn Llywelyn as the site of the royal llys. These claims are part of a local disagreement. (Note: "It's my duty to Welsh history to prove that Llywelyn the Great lived in my house" Ian Skidmore, Daily Post, Monday, 19 November 2001 (formal archive, paysite)) (Note: Wales online Keep an open mind on princes’ palace site. Western Mail letters: Wednesday, 28 November 2012. "We believe that the Garth Celyn Trust’s fierce promotion of Pen y Bryn as the site of the “palace” of the Princes of Gwynedd is highly partisan and obstructs historical debate... In the absence of convincing evidence to support the contention that Pen y Bryn is the actual site of the Llywelyns’ “palace”, we and many others believe that the available evidence favours the site in the centre of the village, excavated in the 1990s and 2010–11. We would therefore urge those interested in the history of the Princes of Gwynedd and Abergwyngregyn to keep an open mind." HYWEL THOMAS and GAVIN GATEHOUSE Abergwyngregyn Regeneration Company and Tirwedd Dyffryn Aber, DEWI HOLLAND ROBERTS Abergwyngregyn Community Council) (Note: Western Mail Letters. A project to share, by John Davies: "I find it sad that three individuals who have refused to visit Garth Celyn and examine the site and the evidence for themselves, continue to hurl invidious remarks in that direction". 30 November 2012.) (Note: Kathryn Pritchard Gibson 20 May 2015 P-04-607 Call for the Welsh Government to Purchase Garth Celyn – Correspondence from the Owner of Garth Celyn to the Committee)

A royal llys of the Welsh princes was located at Abergwyngregyn; in November 1282 Prince Llywelyn ap Gruffudd dated letters to the archbishop of Canterbury at "Garth Kelyn". In 1537 John Leland reported "The Moode, in the paroche of Aber otherwise Llan Boduan, wher Tussog Lluelin uab Gerwerde Trundon (sic) had a castel or palace on a hille by the Chirch, wherof yet parte stondith."

A high-status structure, associated with 13th and 14th century material and thought to be the royal llys with its domestic and administrative buildings, has been found in the valley bottom, on the other side of the river and some 185 metres from Pen y Bryn. It is by the mound known as y Mŵd, near which in 1811 visible remains were locally supposed to be the palace of the Welsh Princes. (Note: A topographical dictionary of the dominions of Wales, exhibiting the names of the several cities, towns, parishes, townships, and hamlets, with the county and division of the county, to which they respectively belong ... Compiled from actual inquiry, and arr. in alphabetical order. Being a continuation of the topography of the United Kingdom of Great Britain and Ireland)
