= Council for Wales and Monmouthshire =

Body created to advise the UK government on Welsh affairs (1949–64)

- Cyngor Cymru a Mynwy
- Formation: May 1949
- Dissolved: May 1966
- Purpose: To advise the UK government on matters of Welsh interest
- Region served: Wales

The Council for Wales and Monmouthshire (Welsh: Cyngor Cymru a Mynwy), was an appointed advisory body announced in 1948 and established in 1949 by the UK government under Labour prime minister Clement Attlee, to advise the government on matters of Welsh interest. It was dissolved with the establishment of the post of Secretary of State for Wales and the formation of the Welsh Office in 1964/65.

== History ==
=== Formation ===
The formation of the council was partially in response to Plaid Cymru's growing influence following the Second World War. Devolution of powers to Wales was opposed by Labour politicians such as Aneurin Bevan, Morgan Phillips and Clement Attlee, who opposed the establishment of a post of Secretary of State for Wales as it would encourage Welsh nationalism. Bevan, the most influential and outspoken Welsh MP of his day, believed any form of devolution would distract Wales from the political mainstream of UK politics and be detrimental to the country's interests. However, Welsh backbenchers such as D. R. Grenfell, W. H. Mainwaring and James Griffiths supported the establishment of a Secretary of State post. As a compromise, the Government agreed to the establishment of a Council for Wales and Monmouthshire. However, it was given no more than a responsibility to advise the UK government on matters of Welsh interest.

The proposal to set up a Council for Wales and Monmouthshire was announced in the House of Commons on 24 November 1948. Its inaugural meeting was in May 1949, and its first business meeting the following month.

=== Dissolution ===
With the failure of unanimous Welsh political opposition to prevent the flooding of Capel Celyn, and subsequent growth in Plaid Cymru influence in the 1950s, the Council for Wales recommended the creation of a Welsh Office and Secretary of State for Wales early in 1957, at time when the governance of Wales on a UK national level was so demonstrably lacking in many people's eyes. However, council chairman and one time Plaid Cymru critic Huw T. Edwards did not believe the Council went far enough. Edwards and four other members of the Council for Wales resigned in 1958 over what Edwards described as "Whitehallism." Later that year Edwards joined Plaid Cymru. The Council became moribund, but retained a formal status until 1966.

Responding to the calls of Welsh devolution, by 1964 the Labour Government gave effect to Council for Wales proposals by establishing the post of Secretary of State for Wales and the Welsh Office (Welsh: Swyddfa Gymreig). A Welsh Economic Council was established the following year, chaired by a Welsh Office minister.

== Terms of reference ==
The council's terms of reference were:

- to meet from time to time and at least quarterly for the interchange of views and information on development and trends in the economic and cultural fields in Wales and Monmouthshire; and
- to ensure the government is adequately informed of the impact of government activities on the general life of the people of Wales and Monmouthshire.

== Structure ==
The council had 27 appointed members. Of these, 12 were nominated by Welsh local authorities; there were also nominees from the Joint Education Committee, the University of Wales, the National Eisteddfod Council, the Welsh Tourist and Holidays Board, and from both management and union sides of Welsh industry and agriculture. The council was required to meet in private, a further source of controversy.

It set up various panels and committees to investigate issues affecting Wales, including a Welsh Language Panel to study and report upon the present situation of the language; a Government Administration Panel; an Industrial Panel; a Rural Development Panel; a Transport Panel; and a Tourist Industry Panel.

=== Chairman ===
The first chairman was Huw T. Edwards, a trade union leader. The Minister for Welsh Affairs within the UK central government could assume the role of chairman if the position was vacant.

No.	Name	Term start	Term end
1	Huw T. Edwards	1949	1958
2	Henry Brooke	1958	1959
3	Richard Aaron	1960	1963

== See also ==
- Partnership Council for Wales, a similar advisory body established in 2006
- Welsh Assembly (Wales Act 1978), a legislature proposed for Wales in 1978
- National Assembly for Wales, a legislature for Wales established in 1999 (known as Senedd Cymru / Welsh Parliament since 2020)
