= Afon Tafolog =

River in Snowdonia

The Afon Tafolog is a small river in Snowdonia in north-west Wales. It is fed by a number of streams which drain the eastern slopes of Drum, a mountain in the Carneddau range.

It is a tributary of Afon Roe which then flows through the village of Rowen before joining the River Conwy.
