= Rowen, Conwy =

Village in Conwy County Borough, Wales

Coordinates: 53.230°N 3.864°W

Rowen
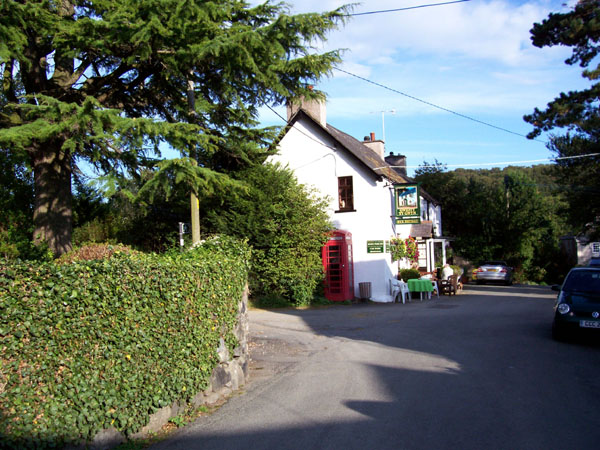
- The Tŷ Gwyn public house in Rowen

- Location within Conwy
- OS grid reference: SH755719
- Community: Caerhun
- Principal area: Conwy
- Country: Wales
- Sovereign state: United Kingdom
- Post town: CONWY
- Postcode district: LL32
- Dialling code: 01492
- Police: North Wales
- Fire: North Wales
- Ambulance: Welsh
- UK Parliament: Bangor Aberconwy
- Senedd Cymru – Welsh Parliament: Aberconwy

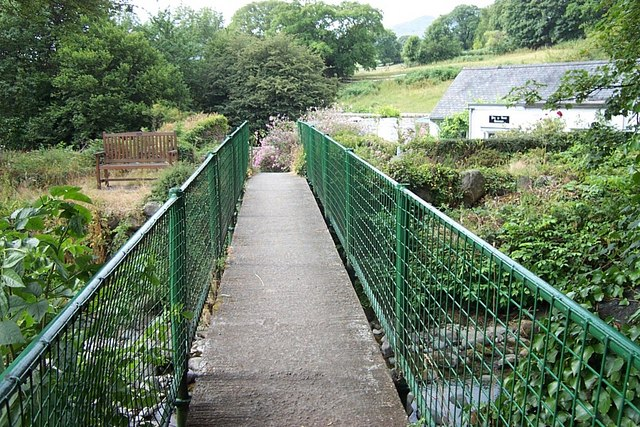
Footbridge over the Afon Roe

Rowen is a village on the western slopes of the Conwy valley in the parish of Caerhun, within now Conwy County Borough, Wales, and historically in Caernarfonshire. It lies off the B5106 road, between Tal y Bont and the Groes Inn. Buildings of Gwynedd 2009 refers to the River Roe probably following the Roman route from Caerhun to Abergwyngregyn. Rowen has won tidiest village awards several times.

In recent times the name of the village has been variously spelled as "Y Wy-Wen" (white river), "Rowen", "Ro-wen" "Roe Wen" and "Roewen". Although the Religious Census of 1851 records the name "Ro-wen", most early 20th-century maps simply use the name "Y Ro", Welsh for "gravel" or "pebbles". Wen means "white", or could mean "holy".

The Afon Roe, a tributary of the River Conwy, flows through the village. A tributary of Afon Roe is Afon Tafolog, which drains the eastern slopes of Drum, a mountain in the Carneddau mountains.

In the book Crwydro Arfon (1959, by Alun Llywelyn-Williams), Rowen is described as "...one of the loveliest villages in Wales" (p. 77).

The following poem, called "Llais Afon, Ro" ("Voice of Afon Ro"), was written by G. Gerallt Davies in 1945:

Hi ddaw'n deg o Dyddyn Du — yn unswydd
I ddawnsio a chanu,
Ac ugain craig yn gwgu,
Ar wen hon ag oerni hy.

And, in 1941 he published "Y Ffynnon":

O'r graig ar ffin y gulffordd
Rhwng Maen y Bardd a'r Ro,
Fe glywir mwynder miwsig
Ffynnon fach sionca'r fro.

The village has a hotel, Tir y Coed; a pub, Y Tŷ Gwyn; and a memorial hall, but the small primary school closed in 2011. The former hostel, YHA Rowen, is now a holiday home, Rhiw Farmhouse Rowen, owned by the Cefn Cae Caravan & Camping Site in the village. Site Social housing came to the village in the 1960s - Llanerch Estate.

In the past, the village had a greater significance; it had three mills, and several ale houses and inns. It also had a pandy or fulling mill, so woollen cloth must have been made nearby. The village is identified in the Caerhun common enclosure award maps. The award map refers to the creation of the White Hart Road on the mountain above Fotty Gwyn and the Roman bridge, possibly related to the old royal mail coaching days. There are past associations with cattle droving and fairs. Bulkley Mill (completed 1684) is one of the notable old mills of the village. One historic source refers to a mountain cloudburst happening above the village, with properties being lost (probably in the mid-1800s).

Nearby is the Roman road route through Bwlch-y-Ddeufaen, with its cromlech Maen-y-Bardd.

The road (some tarmac, some unmade) from Rowen to Cae Coch NW of the village, passes through an area rich in archaeology -- a dolmen, a stone circle, standing stones etc are marked on the OS map; some are visible from the road.

Part of the A Family at War series (Granada TV) was filmed here.

== Interesting local buildings ==
- Ty Pandy - the original woollen or fulling mill c.1800 and modified in Victorian times; still has a mill race and mill pond fed by the river
- Pen-y-Bont 'By the Bridge' - c.16th century, river stone cottage; possibly the oldest building in the village
- Seion Methodist Chapel and Vestry - 1841
- Former Seion Chapel - 1819
- Llannerch y Felin - Elizabethan Snowdonia-type house
- Bodafon and Fronfa - houses adjacent to the former post office with old Georgian style porches since removed; stables/store below
- Llais Afon - large village terrace house (formerly two houses) with original sash windows and a former carpenter's workshop to the side;
- Coed Mawr Hall - probably mid-19th-century
- Rock House - large house above Coed Mawr Hall
- Tan yr Onnen cottage with dated gate stone
- Glyn Isa - 17th-century country house
- Gilfach - with lovely gardens
- Y Swan - old village inn, now a house
- The old cobbler's shop facing the road (near Ty Gwyn)
- Pandy - the manor (historically, Pandy was Lord of the Manorial )
- Bulkeley Mill - old mill property
- Llangelynin Old Church - ancient church, Grade 1 Listed, on the hillside 1.3 miles north of Rowen

=== Local connections ===
- G. Gerallt Davies - poet and writer; Pengwern
- Huw T. Edwards - politician, poet and writer; Tros fy Tresi; see village plaque
- Edward Nefydd Evans - gardener, nurseryman and plantsman; born in Rowen in the 1930s; left in spring 2015, after 85 years
- Harriet and Jack Evans - from Llannefydd/Llansannan in the 1930s
- Isoline Gee - Gilfach
- Arthur Tysilio Johnson - plantsman and garden writer; 1930s; A Woodland Garden in Wales
- Margaret Lacey - actress, ballet teacher and film star in the 1960s - 70s; I'm All Right Jack
- Kyffin Roberts - Wern; Tyddyn Robin, Llanbedr
- Wyn Roberts, Baron Roberts of Conwy
- H. G. Williams - writer
- Scriven Williams
- Edward Doylerush, aviation historian and author
