= Pen y Castell =

Hill in Conwy County Borough, Wales

Coordinates: 53.20682°N 3.93595°W

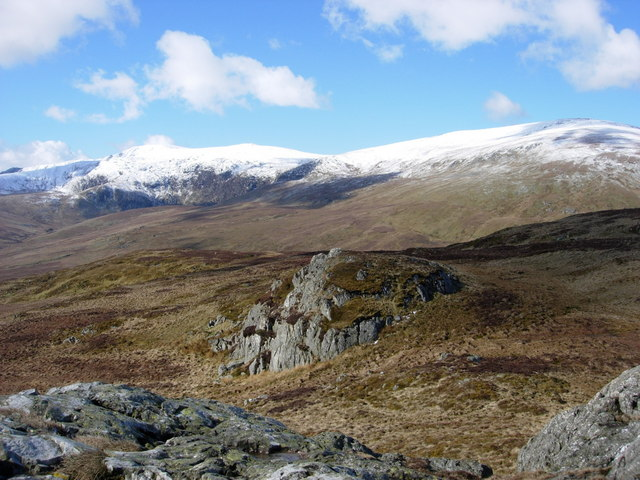
- Foel-fras(right) and Garnedd Uchaf (left) from the summit of Pen y Castell.

Highest point
- Elevation: 623 m (2,044 ft)
- Prominence: 29 m (95 ft)
- Listing: sub Hewitt, Nuttall

Naming
- Language of name: Welsh

Geography
- Location: Conwy, Wales
- Parent range: Snowdonia
- OS grid: SH708695

Pen y Castell is a summit in the Carneddau mountains in north Wales. It tops the east ridge of Drum (Wales). The summit consists of rocky outcrops amid a small boggy plateau. Views of the higher Carneddau ridge to the west, Craig Eigiau to the south, Tal y Fan to the north and the Conwy valley to the east can be seen.
