= Abergwyngregyn =

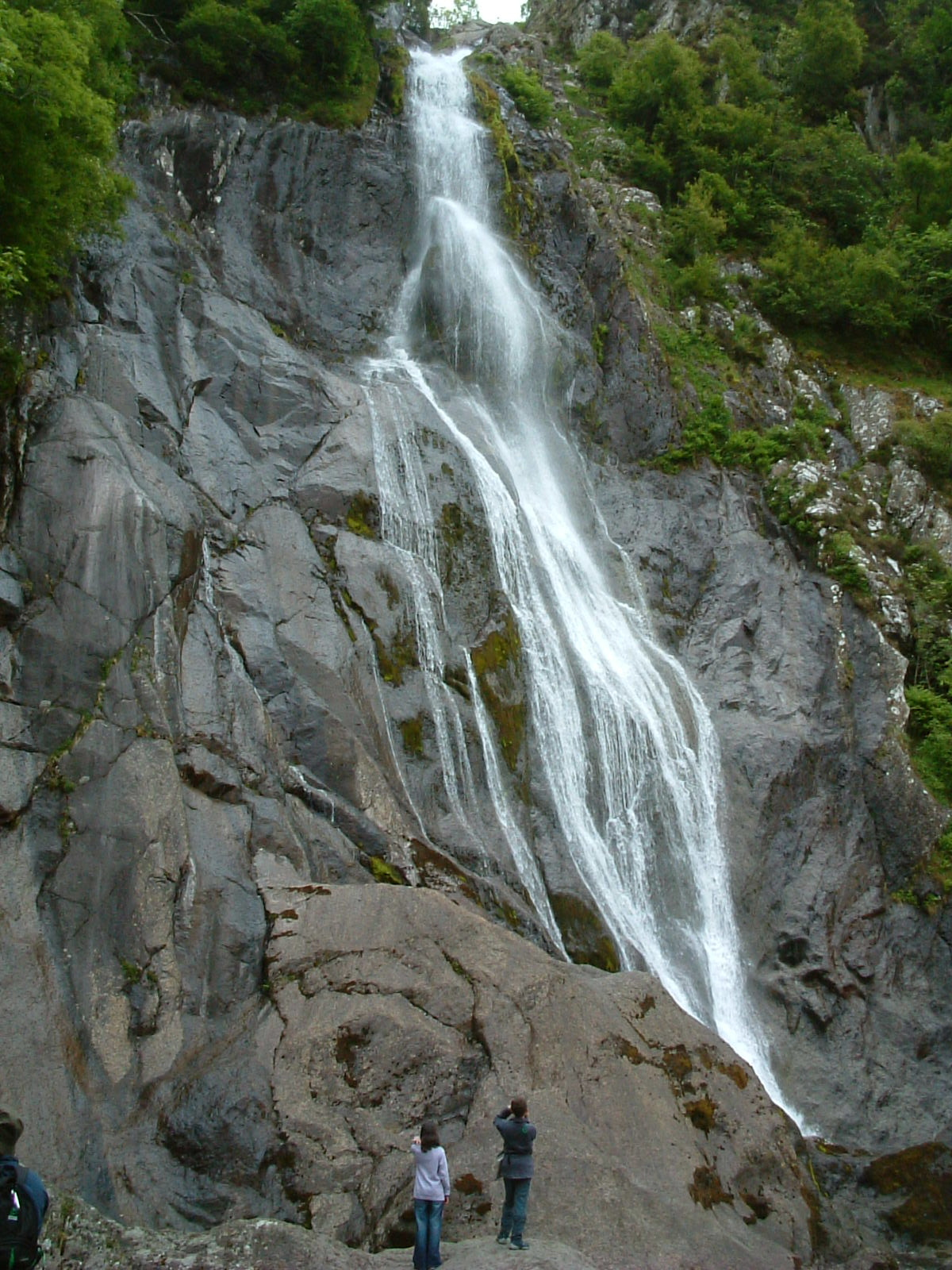
- Aber Falls (size shown by people below)

- Location within Gwynedd
- Area: 29.70 km^{2} (11.47 sq mi)
- Population: 240
  - Density: 8/km^{2} (21/sq mi)
- OS grid reference: SH653726
- Community: Aber
- Principal area: Gwynedd
- Preserved county: Gwynedd
- Country: Wales
- Sovereign state: United Kingdom
- Post town: LLANFAIRFECHAN
- Postcode district: LL33
- Dialling code: 01248
- Police: North Wales
- Fire: North Wales
- Ambulance: Welsh
- UK Parliament: Bangor Aberconwy
- Senedd Cymru – Welsh Parliament: Arfon
- Website: community council
- List of places UK Wales Gwynedd 53.234°N 4.019°W Map of the community

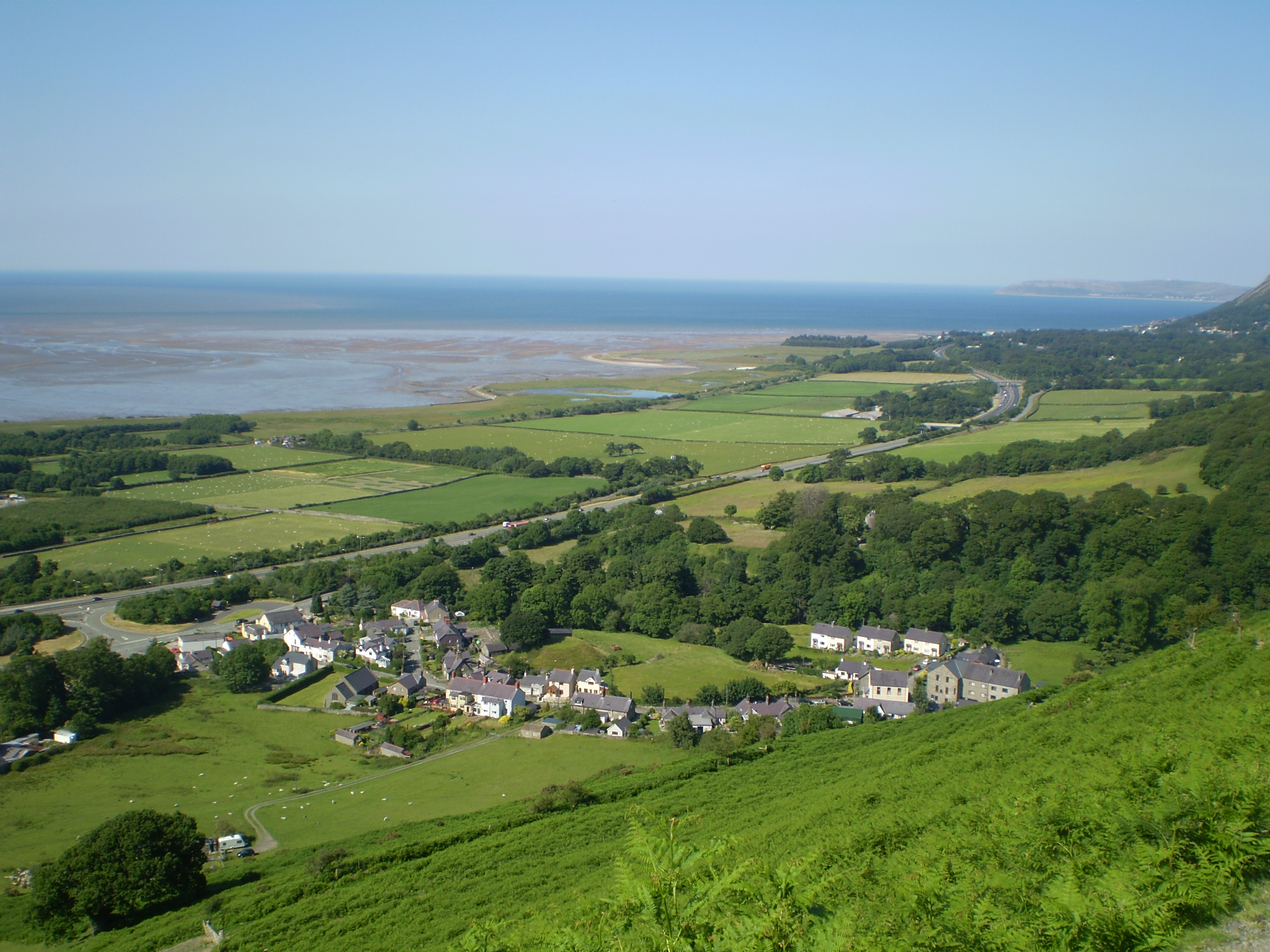
Aber village

Abergwyngregyn (Welsh: [abɛrɡwɨnˈɡrɛɡɨn]) is a village and community of historical note in Gwynedd, a county and principal area in Wales. Under its historic name of Aber Garth Celyn it was the seat of Llywelyn ap Gruffudd. It lies in the historic county of Caernarfonshire.

It is located at grid reference SH653726, adjacent to the A55, five miles (8 km) east of Bangor, eight miles (13 km) west of Conwy.

The Aber community, which covers an area of 2,970 hectares (11.5 mi^{2}), has a population of 240 (2011).

== History ==
Abergwyngregyn, generally shortened to Aber, is a settlement of great antiquity and pre-Edwardian Conquest importance on the north coast of Gwynedd. Its boundaries stretch from the Menai Strait up to the headwaters of the Afon Goch and Afon Anafon. Protected to the east by the headland of Penmaenmawr, and at its rear by Snowdonia, it controlled the ancient crossing point of the Lafan Sands to Anglesey. A pre-Roman defensive enclosure, Maes y Gaer, which rises above Pen y Bryn on the eastern side of the valley, has far reaching views over Irish Sea with the Isle of Man visible on a clear day. The Roman road from Chester (Deva), linking the forts of Canovium (later name Conovium) and Segontium, crossed the river at this point.

This was the seat of Llywelyn ap Gruffudd, the last native Prince of Wales, whose daughter Gwenllian of Wales was born here in June 1282. His wife, Eleanor de Montfort, died here as a result of the birth on 19 June 1282. In June 1283 Dafydd ap Gruffudd, Llywelyn's brother, who assumed the title of Prince of Wales after Llywelyn's murder in December 1282, was captured at Bera Mountain above the present village.

Abergwyngregyn was one of ten sites chosen for the Welsh Cultural Heritage Initiative in 2009.

=== Y Mŵd ===
Y Mŵd is an earthen mound on the valley floor in the middle of the village, at SH656726. The mound is circular, 22 feet (6.7 m) high with a level oval top 57 by 48 feet (17 by 15 m). It has been regarded as the base of a Norman castle, and on that basis was renamed 'Aber Castle Mound' by the Ancient Monuments Board. E. S. Armitage, in The Early Norman Castles of the British Isles, suggested that it might have been constructed by Hugh d'Avranches, Earl of Chester. The word mŵd in early Welsh means 'vault' or 'arched area', and though there are traces of a ditch on the south side, no further defensive features have been identified.

Other similar mounds have been found especially in northern and western Britain, such as the one on which the Pillar of Eliseg near Llangollen stands, and the one at Scone in Scotland.

==== Adjacent stone building, medieval royal llys ====
A large structure on the valley bottom between Y Mŵd, the smithy and the water mill was excavated in 1993 and again in 2010. It appears to be the remains of a high-status building from the 14th century, possibly built before 1283 under the last independent princes of Wales, or after 1283 under a king of England, in the early decades after the Conquest by Edward I. No defensive structures have been found. The floor plan has been interpreted as a medieval hall, 11.2m by 8.0m internally, with large wings at the ends. A separate enclosure may have been used for large ovens or for metalworking. The 1993 dig found a bronze brooch, some medieval pottery, and a coin from the years before the conquest. The Royal Commission on the Ancient and Historical Monuments of Wales suggests that this site could be associated with the medieval royal llys (princely court).

== Demographics ==
Aber community's population was 240, according to the 2011 census; an 8.2% increase since the 222 people noted in 2001.

The 2011 census showed 48.5% of the population could speak Welsh, a rise from 44.0% in 2001.

The parish church was recently closed.

== Pen y Bryn ==
Pen y Bryn is a manor house, recorded from the Jacobean period and with earlier lower stonework, on a promontory some two hundred yards to the east of the village centre. It overlooks the village and the Menai Straits towards Anglesey. With its adjacent buildings and ground works it forms a double bank and ditch enclosure now known as Garth Celyn. This is also claimed to be the site of the pre-Conquest royal llys. A Neolithic burial urn was discovered when a driveway was being made to the house in 1824.

== Aber Valley ==
=== Aber Falls ===
The valley provides access to one of Wales's great waterfalls, the Aber Falls, where the Afon Goch falls precipitously some 120 feet (37 m) over a sill of igneous rock into a marshy area where it is joined by two tributaries. The enlarged stream, Afon Rhaeadr Fawr, heads towards the Menai Strait and the sea. Part way down it becomes known as Afon Aber.

=== Bont Newydd ===
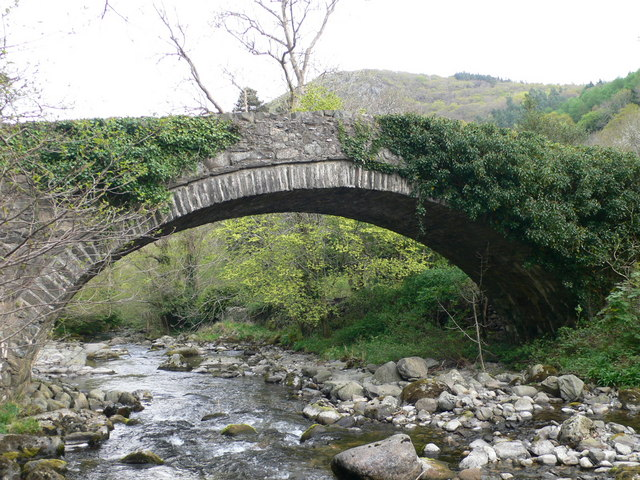
Bont Newydd

The single barrel-vault bridge at SH662720 spans Afon Aber, providing a roadway across the river, some 25 ft (7.6 m) in width. The date of construction is unknown, but its existence was marked on the Ordnance Survey map of 1822. The bridge provided a safe crossing for drovers leading animals on a drovers road up the valley. Large stones in the river under the bridge mark the site of an earlier ford.

Aber is the coastal crossing point for the ancient drovers and the later Roman road that led across the Lafan Sands to Anglesey. The Roman road from Chester crossed the river Conwy south of Tal-y-Cafn, connected with the fort at Conovium Caerhun by a short branch, then led up via Rowen and Bwlch-y-Ddeufaen, the Pass of the Two Stones, as an engineered overlay on top of the earlier British trackway, into Snowdonia.

The Roman road descends down Rhiwiau, the valley between Llanfairfechan and Aber, follows the coastal route west, crosses the river by means of a ford, passes by the church and leads towards the major Roman fort at Segontium, Caernarfon.

The drovers' road from Anglesey came into the settlement on the west bank of the valley bottom, where provision was made for the animals to be penned and shod, and the feet of the geese to be coated in pitch, and then followed the valley to join the Roman road.

Three Roman milestones have been discovered in the area. Two of these, found in 1883 in a field called Caegwag, on the farm Rhiwiau Uchaf SH679727, are now in the British Museum, London.

=== Maes y Gaer ===
This is a defensive enclosure, built on a hill that forms the western end of a spur overlooking the valley at SH663725. It is approx 730 ft (220 m). above O.D. The walls of the enclosure are pear shaped and protect an area 400 ft (120 m) long and 220 ft (67 m) wide of about 1.5 acres (6,100 m^{2}). Maes y Gaer has a steep drop on all sides except the east, where there is a more gentle slope leading to the pasture land. The entrance is on the south-east, now badly ruined but originally 11 ft (3.4 m) wide, with a passageway to the interior 20 ft (6 m) long.

=== Hafod Celyn, Hafod Garth Celyn ===
This is the summer pastureland of Garth Celyn, on open moorland rising to 800 ft (240 m) above Ordnance Datum at SH676713. The small building on this site, now in ruins, was rebuilt in the 18th century on the ruins of an earlier building that extended further to the west.

== Llyn Anafon ==
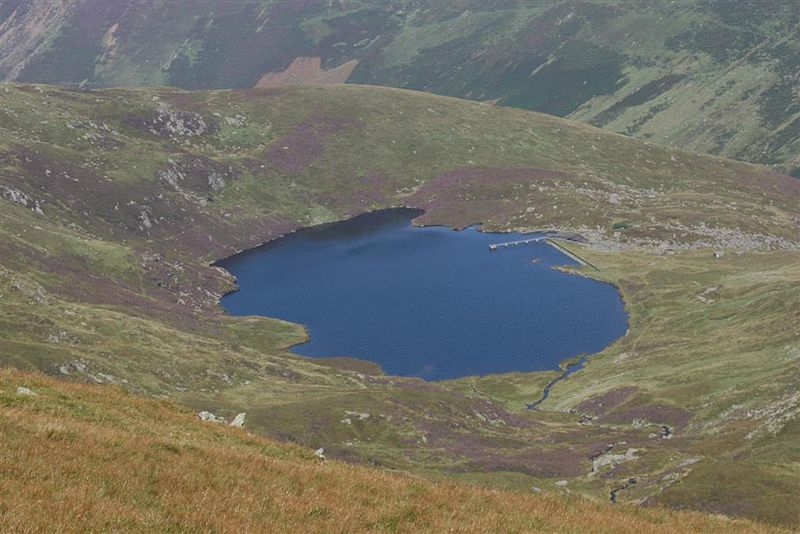
Llyn Anafon

Llyn Anafon is the most northerly of the Carneddau lakes, lying between Llwytmor, Foel Fras and Y Drum. It has a maximum depth of 10 feet (3.0 m). A dam was built across the lake in 1930 to enable water to be supplied to the nearby coastal villages. There are brown trout in the lake and by long held custom people who lived in the village had the right to fish both the lake and the river. Half a mile below the lake there are prehistoric hut circles and other signs of early human inhabitation. There is an arrow stone on the lower slopes of Foel Ganol, and another leading down to Cammarnaint Farm. A gold cross, five inches (130 mm) in height, was found on the summit of Carnedd y Ddelw above the lake in 1812.

The earliest name for the vale was Nant Mawan ('Record of Caernarfon', 1371, Bangor University Archives). Mawan, a personal name, contracted over time. Llyn Nant Mawan, became Llyn Nan (Mafon) and then Llyn (N)anafon.

Nearby is an area known as Buarth Merched Mafon ('enclosure of Mafon's daughters').

Nothing is known about Mawan, but his son Llemenig is mentioned in several early Welsh sources. His name is mentioned in two englynion at the end of a 'Cynddylan' fragment in the Middle Welsh poetry known as Canu Llywarch Hen (XI. 112b.113b).

When I hear the thundering roar, [it is] the host of Llemenig mab Mahawen [read Mawan]. Battle-hound of wrath, victorious in battle.

In Triad Ynys Prydain no. 43, his horse is described as one of the Three pack-Horses of Ynys Prydain. Ysgwyddfrith ('Dappled-shoulder') the horse of Llemenig ap Mawan.

== Wildlife ==
Coedydd Aber is situated in an area of scenic beauty. The steep sided wooded valley, Nant Aber Garth Celyn, leads to the foothill of Y Carneddau. The river has the steepest fall of any in Wales and England. There is a wide variety of habitats in the valley including a diversity of woodlands, open farmland and scrub. A range of birds can be found here, including raven, buzzard, peregrine falcon, sparrowhawk and chough on the sea cliffs, tree pipit and redstart along the woodland edge, and pied flycatcher and wood warbler in the Welsh oak woods. By the shore, a hide has been erected on the edge of the Menai Strait, providing clear views of the seabirds on the Lafan sands. As a young man, Sir Peter Scott used Twr Llywelyn, part of Pen y Bryn, as a place to position his telescope, to watch the birds flying in off the Irish Sea. According to a sign, red squirrels were last seen in 1978.

== Glaciation ==
Since the beginning of the Quaternary, 2.6 million years ago, the uplands of North Wales have been subject to several phases of glaciation. The Aber valley provides physical evidence of the two most recent phases of glaciation which occurred between about 28,000-16,000 and 12,970 - 11,770 years ago. The Carneddau have a notable range of glacial and periglacial features that have been studied by geologists, including Charles Darwin, for well over a century, and plays a key role not only into research into landforms, but also into climate change and vegetation history.

== Climate ==
Like most of the United Kingdom, Aber has an oceanic climate with warm summers, cool winters, few extremes of temperature and moderate rain all year round. Aber held the UK record for the warmest January day, 18.3 °C (64.9 °F) set on 27 January 1958 and 10 January 1971, a record that it also shared with Aboyne and Inchmarlo in Scotland. However, on 28 January 2024, a temperature of 19.9 °C (67.8 °F) was recorded at Achfary in the Scottish Highlands, surpassing that figure. Between 1959 and 2002, the highest recorded temperature in Aber was 33.4 °C (92.1 °F) on 2 August 1990 and the lowest was −8.2 °C (17.2 °F) on 1 February 1972.

Climate data for Aber 29m amsl (1991-2020) (extremes 1959-2002)
Month	Jan	Feb	Mar	Apr	May	Jun	Jul	Aug	Sep	Oct	Nov	Dec	Year
Record high °C (°F)	18.3 (64.9)	18.4 (65.1)	20.6 (69.1)	22.4 (72.3)	27.2 (81.0)	31.0 (87.8)	32.0 (89.6)	33.4 (92.1)	26.0 (78.8)	24.9 (76.8)	19.8 (67.6)	18.0 (64.4)	33.4 (92.1)
Mean daily maximum °C (°F)	9.2 (48.6)	9.2 (48.6)	10.6 (51.1)	12.6 (54.7)	15.4 (59.7)	17.9 (64.2)	19.6 (67.3)	19.5 (67.1)	17.7 (63.9)	14.8 (58.6)	11.8 (53.2)	9.7 (49.5)	14.0 (57.2)
Daily mean °C (°F)	6.5 (43.7)	6.3 (43.3)	7.6 (45.7)	9.3 (48.7)	12.0 (53.6)	14.5 (58.1)	16.2 (61.2)	16.3 (61.3)	14.5 (58.1)	11.9 (53.4)	9.1 (48.4)	6.9 (44.4)	11.0 (51.8)
Mean daily minimum °C (°F)	3.7 (38.7)	3.5 (38.3)	4.5 (40.1)	6.0 (42.8)	8.6 (47.5)	11.0 (51.8)	12.9 (55.2)	13.0 (55.4)	11.4 (52.5)	9.0 (48.2)	6.4 (43.5)	4.1 (39.4)	7.9 (46.2)
Record low °C (°F)	−7.1 (19.2)	−8.2 (17.2)	−5.0 (23.0)	−3.5 (25.7)	0.6 (33.1)	2.6 (36.7)	5.5 (41.9)	5.0 (41.0)	3.4 (38.1)	−0.3 (31.5)	−3.5 (25.7)	−6.1 (21.0)	−8.2 (17.2)
Average precipitation mm (inches)	115.7 (4.56)	89.5 (3.52)	81.0 (3.19)	59.4 (2.34)	62.8 (2.47)	71.3 (2.81)	60.7 (2.39)	84.7 (3.33)	93.7 (3.69)	118.3 (4.66)	137.4 (5.41)	140.1 (5.52)	1,114.7 (43.89)
Average precipitation days (≥ 1.0 mm)	15.3	12.9	12.4	11.5	10.9	10.0	11.5	12.3	12.7	14.7	17.7	16.7	158.5
Mean monthly sunshine hours	41.2	68.5	112.3	163.9	214.7	191.1	187.0	170.1	134.1	92.5	48.7	33.4	1,457.5
Source 1: Met Office
Source 2: Starlings Roost Weather

== Literature ==
- Saunders Lewis play Siwan
- Thomas Parry play Llywelyn Fawr
- Edith Pargeter novel The Green Branch
- Edith Pargeter novel The Brothers of Gwynedd
- Ellis Peters novel The Summer of the Danes
- Barbara Erskine novel Child of the Phoenix
- Sharon Penman novel Here be Dragons
- Sharon Penman novel Falls the Shadow
- Sharon Penman novel The Reckoning

== See also ==
- Aber and Inver as place-name elements
- Arllechwedd (electoral ward)

== Bibliography ==
- Caernarvonshire Historical Society Transactions 1962 Article Aber Gwyn Gregin Professor T. Jones Pierce
- Y Traethodydd 1998 Tystiolaeth Garth Celyn
- Gwynfor Evans (2001) Cymru O Hud Abergwyngregyn
- Gwynfor Evans (2002) Eternal Wales Abergwyngregyn
- John Edward Lloyd (1911) A history of Wales from the earliest times to the Edwardian conquest (Longmans, Green & Co.) see pp. 670–71 for Gwern y Grog
- O. H. Fynes-Clinton (Oxford 1912) The Welsh Vocabulary of the Bangor District
- Harold Hughes and Herbert North (Bangor, 192) The Old Churches of Snowdonia, pp. 152–155.
