= Bwlch-y-Ddeufaen =

Mountain pass in Conwy, Wales

Coordinates: 53.2280°N 3.9279°W

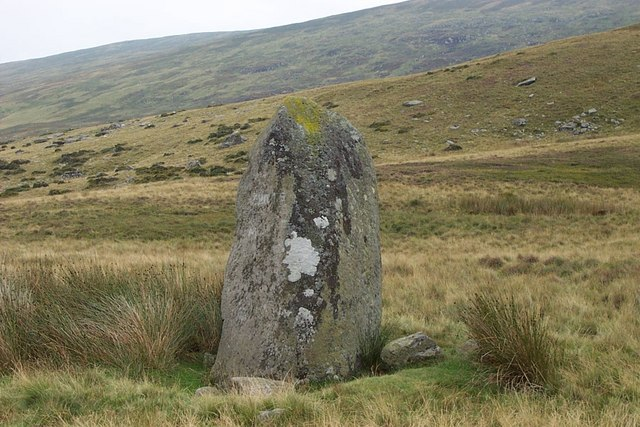
The taller (3m) south-east stone

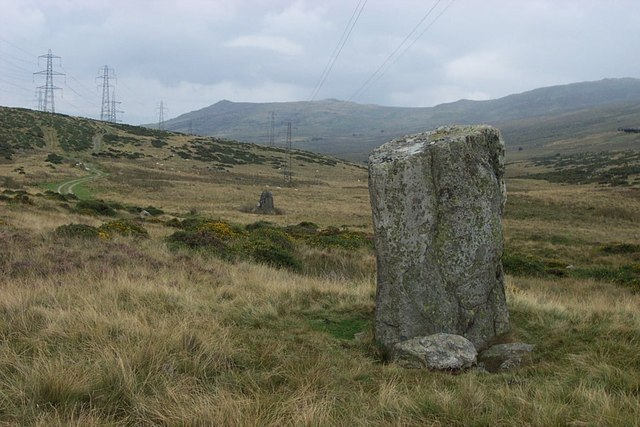
The north-west stone (2m)

Bwlch-y-Ddeufaen (Welsh for 'gap/pass of the two stones') is a mountain pass in Conwy county borough, north Wales, traversable only on foot or horseback, following the former Roman road from Caerhun (Canovium) to Caernarfon (Segontium). The route may be followed by road to Rowen or to Llanbedr-y-Cennin and from either, the way, through a mountain gate, is a clearly marked green path to Abergwyngregyn. The route lies between the peaks of Tal y Fan and Drum, in the Carneddau range in north Snowdonia. The distance from Rowen to Abergwyngregyn is about nine miles of mostly high mountain footpath. Near the Abergwyngregyn end, the route forms part of the North Wales Path.

== History ==
The Two Stones are large pre-historic monoliths of unknown date, which mark the summit at about 1,400 feet (430 m). The south-eastern stone measures 3m in height, the smaller north-western stone is 2m high. Also, near the mountain gate, on the south side of the track, is a stone circle and a cromlech called Maen-y-bardd (the bard's stone) nearer Rowen.

The path was a drovers' road leading via the Lavan Sands to Anglesey. On the mainland side, the route was part of the network of drovers' roads that reached all the major centres of population in Wales and England. Cattle, sheep and even geese were regularly driven that way on foot down the ages to 1850 or even later, quite often as far as London, which was the largest market in Britain.

Several Roman milestones have been discovered on this route or in the area, including one giving the distance to Kanovium (sic).

Near the Abergwyngregyn end of the green path is a green mound, the relic of a motte-and-bailey castle of Llywelyn the Great.

In the eighteenth century, when turnpike road construction was in vogue, the Caernarvonshire Turnpike Trust was authorised by an act of Parliament of 1777 to reconstruct this ancient Roman road from Tal-y-Cafn via Bwlch-y-Ddeufaen over the high pass to Abergwyngregyn but they failed to carry out the work.
