= Drum (Wales) =

Mountain in Gwynedd, Wales

Drum (Carnedd Penyborth-Goch)
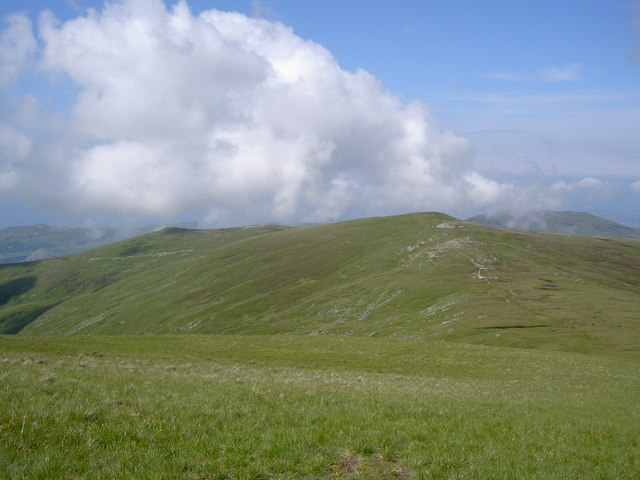
- Carnedd y Ddelw (Left) and Drum (Wales) (Right) from Foel-fras.

Highest point
- Elevation: 771 m (2,530 ft)
- Prominence: 48 m (157 ft)
- Parent peak: Carnedd Llewelyn
- Listing: Hewitt, Nuttall
- Coordinates: 53.20682°N 3.93595°W

Naming
- English translation: ridge
- Language of name: Welsh
- Pronunciation: Welsh: [ˈdrɨm]

Geography
- Location within Gwynedd
- Location: Conwy / Gwynedd, Wales
- Parent range: Snowdonia
- OS grid: SH708695

Listed summits of Drum (Wales)
Name	Grid ref	Height	Status
Carnedd y Ddelw		686 m (2,251 ft)	Nuttall
Pen y Castell		623 m (2,044 ft)	sub Hewitt, Nuttall

Drum (Welsh pronunciation: [ˈdrɨm]) (Welsh: Y Drum = the ridge) is a summit in the Carneddau mountains in northern Wales, 2 km north-east of Foel-fras. It is 771 m (2,526 ft) high. It is also known as Carnedd Penyborth-Goch.

Its eastern slopes are drained by the Afon Tafolog, a tributary of Afon Roe which flows through the village of Rowen before joining the River Conwy.

== See also ==
- Blue Joker, an experimental airborne early-warning radar, tested from a site high on the mountain in 1956
