= Tal y Fan =

Mountain in Conwy County Borough, Wales

Coordinates: 53.23517°N 3.90576°W

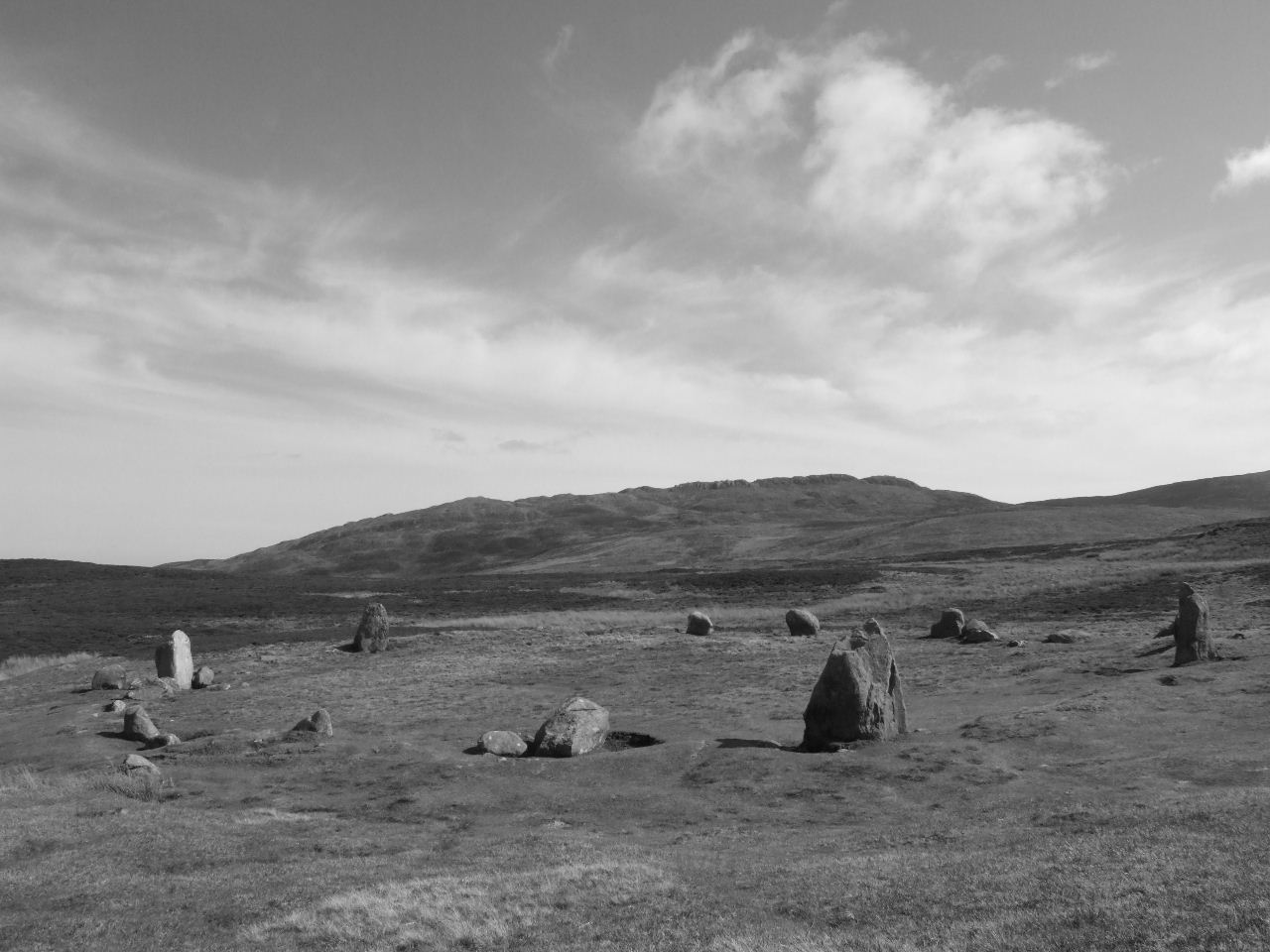
- A prehistoric stone circle with Tal y Fan in the background.

Highest point
- Elevation: 610 metres (2,001 ft)
- Prominence: 190 m (620 ft)
- Parent peak: Carnedd Llewelyn
- Listing: Marilyn, Hewitt, Nuttall

Geography
- Location: Conwy, Wales
- Parent range: Snowdonia
- OS grid: SH729726
- Topo map: OS Explorer OL17

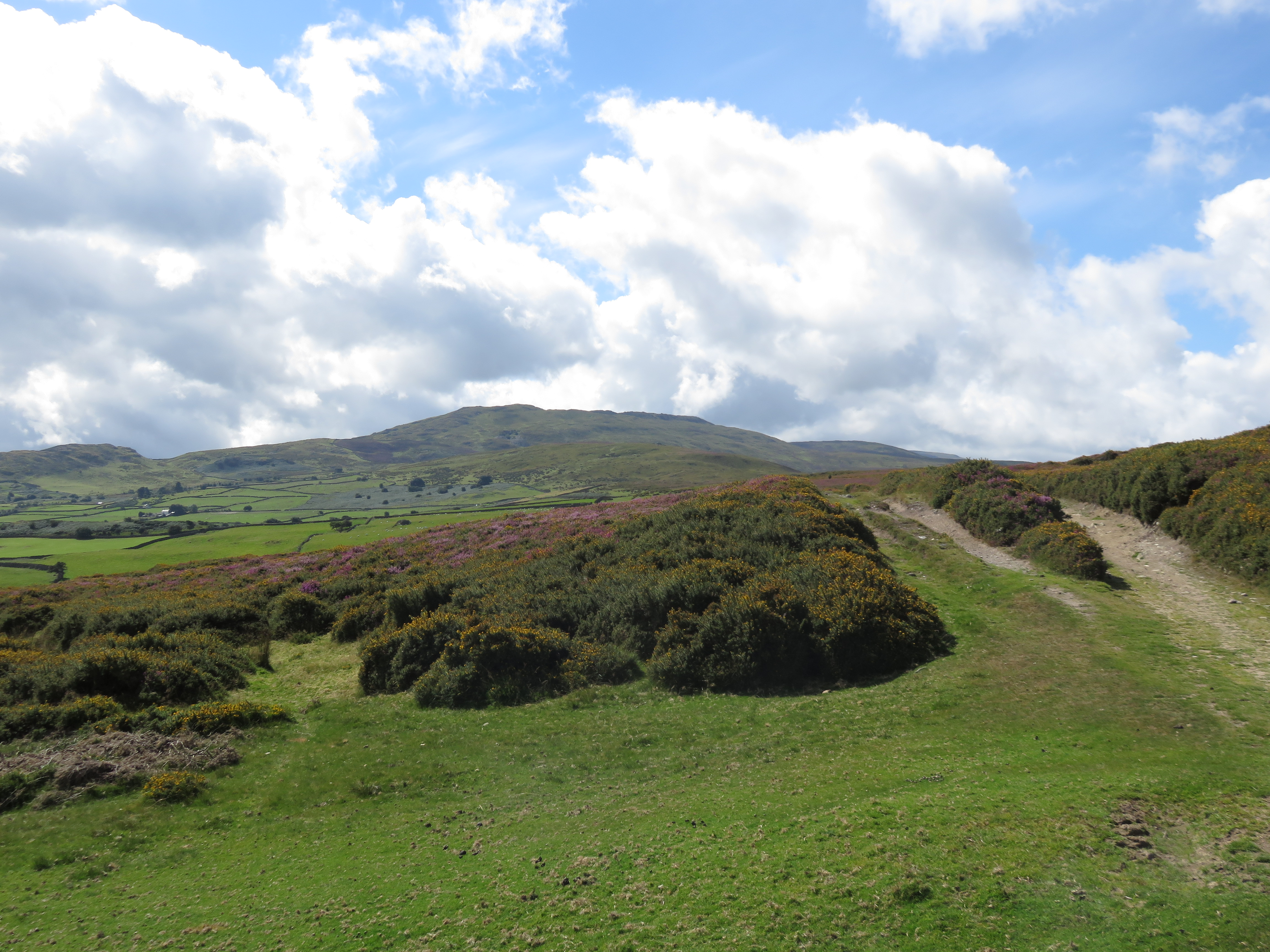
Tal y Fan in distance

Listed summits of Tal y Fan
Name	Grid ref	Height	Status
Foel Lwyd		600 metres (1,969 ft)	sub Hewitt

Tal y Fan is an outlying peak of the Carneddau mountains in North Wales. It is one of the four Marilyns that make up the Carneddau, the others being Carnedd Llywelyn, Pen Llithrig y Wrach and Creigiau Gleision.

It is 610 metres (2,001 ft) high, and lies midway between the Conwy valley to the east and Penmaenmawr on the coast to the north-west. It is the most northerly 2000 ft summit in Wales.

On 6 May 2013 BBC News reported that a precise GPS measurement of Tal y Fan's height had been verified by the Ordnance Survey as 609.98 metres or 2,001 feet, confirming its status as a mountain. Bwlch y Ddeufaen separates Tal y Fan from the main Carneddau ridge, the closest summit on which is Carnedd y Ddelw. Pen y Castell is directly opposite to the south.
