= Geography of Ireland =

- Continent: Europe
- Region: Northwestern Europe
- Area
  - Total: 84,421 km^{2} (32,595 sq mi)
  - Land: 98.2%
  - Water: 1.8%
- Coastline: 7,524 km (4,675 mi)
- Highest point: Carrauntoohil 1,039 metres (3,409 ft)
- Lowest point: North Slob −3 metres (−10 ft)
- Longest river: River Shannon 360.5 km (224.0 mi)
- Largest lake: Lough Neagh 392 km^{2} (151 mi^{2})
- Climate: temperate oceanic climate with some upland areas classified as oceanic subpolar
- Terrain: flat, low-lying area in the midlands, ringed by mountain ranges
- Natural resources: aquaculture, fertile soil, freshwater, timber, peat, bauxite, copper, zinc, lead, gold, silver, iron, gypsum, natural gas, hydropower, wind energy
- Natural hazards: Cyclones, flooding, thunderstorms
- Environmental issues: Water pollution, Leaching, Climate change, Waste disposal

Ireland is an island in Northwestern Europe, in the north Atlantic Ocean. It is the third-largest island in Europe, and the 20th-largest in the world. The island measures about 480 km (300 mi) north-south, and 275 km (171 mi) east-west, with a total area of 84,421 km^{2} (32,595 sq mi). It lies about 53°N 8°W, near the western edge of the European continental shelf, part of the Eurasian Plate. Ireland is separated from the island of Great Britain by the Irish Sea to the east, and from mainland Europe by the Celtic Sea to the south. It is bounded to the north by the North Channel and to the south by St George's Channel. Ireland is the second-largest landmass in the British Isles, after Great Britain and before Lewis and Harris.

Its main geographical features include low central plains surrounded by coastal mountains. The highest peak is Carrauntoohil (Irish: Corrán Tuathail), which is 1,039 metres (3,409 ft) above sea level. The western coastline is rugged, with many islands, peninsulas, headlands and bays, while the southern and northern coasts have a smaller number of substantial sea inlets, such as Lough Foyle and Cork Harbour; no part of the land is more than around 110 km (68 mi) from the sea. The island is almost bisected by the River Shannon, which at 360.5 km (224 mi) with a 102.1 km (63 mi) estuary is the longest river in Ireland and flows south from County Cavan in the province of Ulster to form the boundary between Connacht and Leinster, and later Munster, and meet the Atlantic just south and west of Limerick. Lough Neagh is the largest of several sizeable lakes along Ireland's rivers.

The island has a temperate oceanic climate, mild and humid, and is warmer than other landmasses at the same latitude thanks to the winds on the Atlantic Ocean, ocean currents, and circulations. The island is one of the least forested areas in Europe, though forestation is expanding, but has a strong agricultural sector. It has a limited range of mineral resources, and has only had two major gas finds, and none in the oil sector. Hydroelectric energy is used, and wind farms are growing; neither solar nor tidal energy is much exploited.

Politically, the island consists of the Republic of Ireland, with jurisdiction over about five-sixths of the island, and Northern Ireland, a constituent part of the United Kingdom, with jurisdiction over the remaining sixth. The island has traditionally been divided into four provinces, each of which is divided into counties. Of the 32 counties in total, 26 are in the Republic of Ireland, with the remaining 6 in Northern Ireland.

== Geological development ==
Slieve League in western Banagh

The geology of Ireland is diverse. Different regions contain rocks belonging to different geological periods, dating back almost 2 billion years. The oldest known Irish rock is about 1.7 billion years old and is found on Inishtrahull Island off the north coast of Inishowen and on the mainland at Annagh Head on the Mullet Peninsula. The newer formations are the drumlins and glacial valleys as a result of the last ice age, and the sinkholes and cave formations in the limestone regions of Clare.

Ireland's geological history includes a wide range of elements, from volcanism and tropical seas to the last glacial period. Ireland was formed in two distinct parts, which slowly joined, uniting about 440 million years ago. As a result of tectonics and the effect of ice, the sea level has risen and fallen. In every area of the country, the rocks which formed can be seen as a result. Finally, the impact of the glaciers shaped the landscape seen today. The variation between the two areas, along with the differences between volcanic areas and shallow seas, led to a range of soils. There are extensive bogs and free-draining brown earths. The mountains are granite, sandstone, limestone with karst areas, and basalt formations.

Most of Ireland was probably above sea level during the last 60 million years. As such its landscapes have been shaped by erosion and weathering on land. Protracted erosion also means most of the Paleogene and Neogene sediments have been eroded away or, as known in a few cases, buried by Quaternary deposits. Before the Quaternary glaciations affected Ireland the landscape had developed thick weathered regolith on the uplands and karst in the lowlands. There has been some controversy regarding the origin of the planation surfaces found in Ireland. While some have argued for an origin in marine planation, others regard these surfaces as peneplains formed by weathering and fluvial erosion. Not only is their origin disputed but also their actual extent and the relative role of sea-level change and tectonics in their shaping. Most river systems in Ireland formed in the Cenozoic before the Quaternary glaciations. Rivers follow for most of their course structural features of the geology of Ireland. Marine erosion since the Miocene may have made Ireland's western coast retreat more than 100 km. Pre-Quaternary relief was more dramatic than today's glacier-smoothened landscapes.

== Physical geography ==
=== Mountain ranges ===
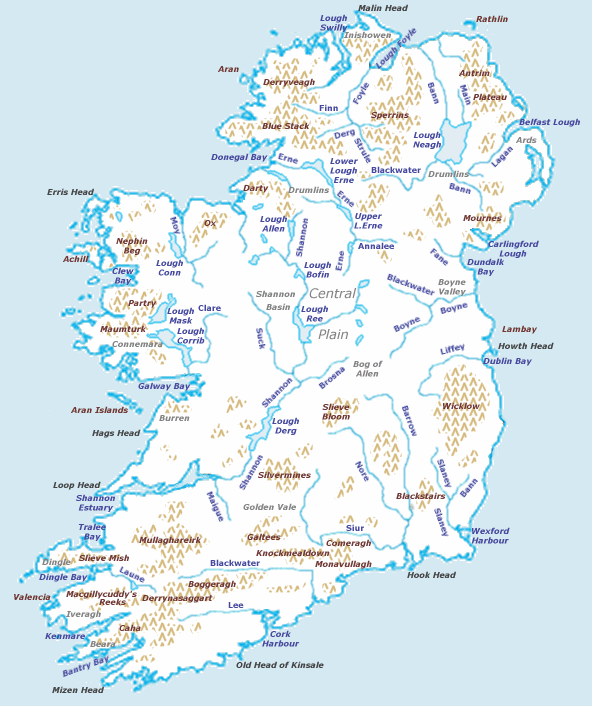
Mountains, lakes, rivers and other physical features of Ireland are shown on this map.

Ireland consists of a mostly flat low-lying area in what are known as the Midlands. It is ringed by mountain ranges such as—beginning in County Cork and working clockwise—the Boggeragh Mountains, Derrynasaggart Mountains, Caha Mountains, MacGillycuddy's Reeks, Slieve Mish Mountains, Mullaghareirk Mountains, the Twelve Bens/Maumturks group, Nephinbeg Mountains, Ox Mountains, Bluestack Mountains, Derryveagh Mountains, Sperrin Mountains, the Mournes, Wicklow Mountains, Blackstairs Mountains, Comeragh Mountains and Knockmealdown Mountains. Some mountain ranges are further inland in the south of Ireland, such as the Galtee Mountains (the highest inland range), Silvermine and Slieve Bloom Mountains. There is an area of raised land near the northeastern coast, the Antrim Plateau, which contains the Glens of Antrim; this area is sometimes called the Mountains of Antrim. The highest peak Carrauntoohil, at 1,038.6 m (3,407 ft) high, is in the MacGillycuddy's Reeks, a range of glacier-carved sandstone mountains. Only three peaks on the island are over 1,000 m (3,300 ft) and another 457 exceed 500 m (1,600 ft). There are a number of walking trails in the mountains, with the longest being that through the Wicklow Mountains. In the Mourne Mountains, with multiple walking trails, a wall was built between the 13 major peaks, the 36-kilometre-long (22 mi) Mourne Wall.

=== Rivers and lakes ===
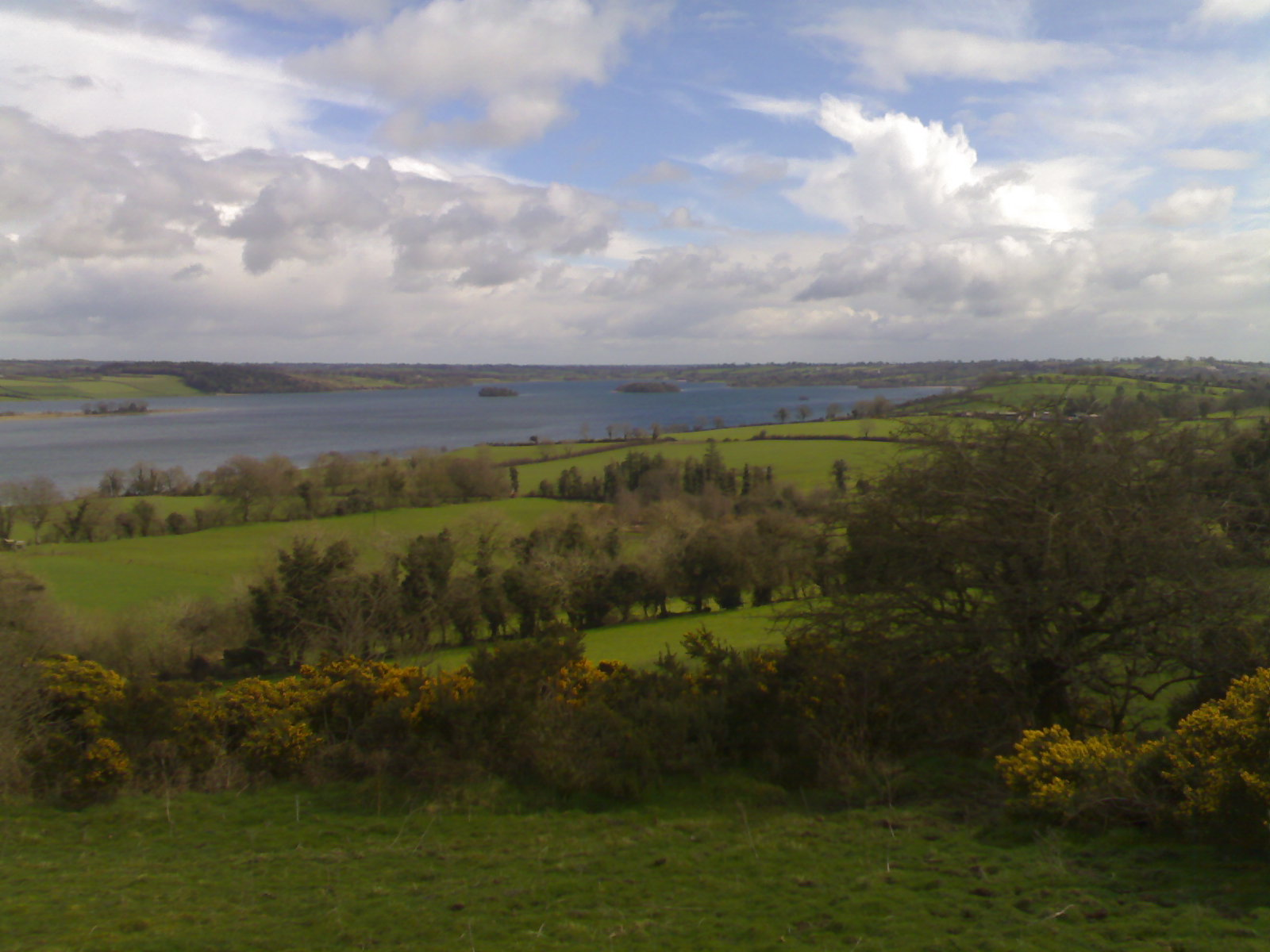
Lough Lene, County Westmeath

Waterbodies accounted for around 2% of the land area of Ireland. In the Republic of Ireland there are over 74,000 kilometres (46,000 mi) of rivers and streams, more than 125,000 hectares (310,000 acres) of lake and over 3,000 hectares (7,400 acres) of reservoirs; these are not evenly distributed—over 30% of the watercourse length is found in Counties Cork, Donegal and Mayo, while Counties Mayo and Galway hold over 40% of the total lake area. Almost all of the reservoir area lies in just two counties, Wicklow (2/3) and Cork (1/3). In Northern Ireland, Lough Neagh is by far the leading source of water.

The River Shannon, at 360.5 kilometres (224.0 mi) in length, is the longest river in Ireland and Britain. With a drainage area of 16,865 km^{2} (6,512 sq mi), the Shannon River Basin covers one-fifth of the island. The Shannon crosses 11 counties and divides the west of Ireland from the south and east. The river develops into three large lakes along its course, Lough Allen, Lough Ree, and Lough Derg. The River Shannon enters the Atlantic Ocean at Limerick city along the Shannon Estuary.

Other major rivers include the River Liffey and its leading tributary, the River Dodder, and the nearby Tolka River, River Slaney, the Three Sisters (the Rivers Nore, Suir and Barrow), River Lee, River Erne, Foyle River, River Bann, River Lagan, and River Boyne. There are also multiple River Blackwaters, the most significant being the Munster Blackwater. The river with the greatest output volume is the Shannon but the second-greatest volume is in the short but powerful River Corrib.

Lough Neagh, in Ulster, is the largest lake in Ireland and Britain with an area of 392 km^{2} (151 mi^{2}). The largest lake in the Republic of Ireland is Lough Corrib 176 km^{2} (68 mi^{2}). Other large lakes, besides the three major Shannon examples, include the two linked lakes known as Lough Erne, Lough Mask and Lough Corrib, and Lough Conn.

=== Inlets ===
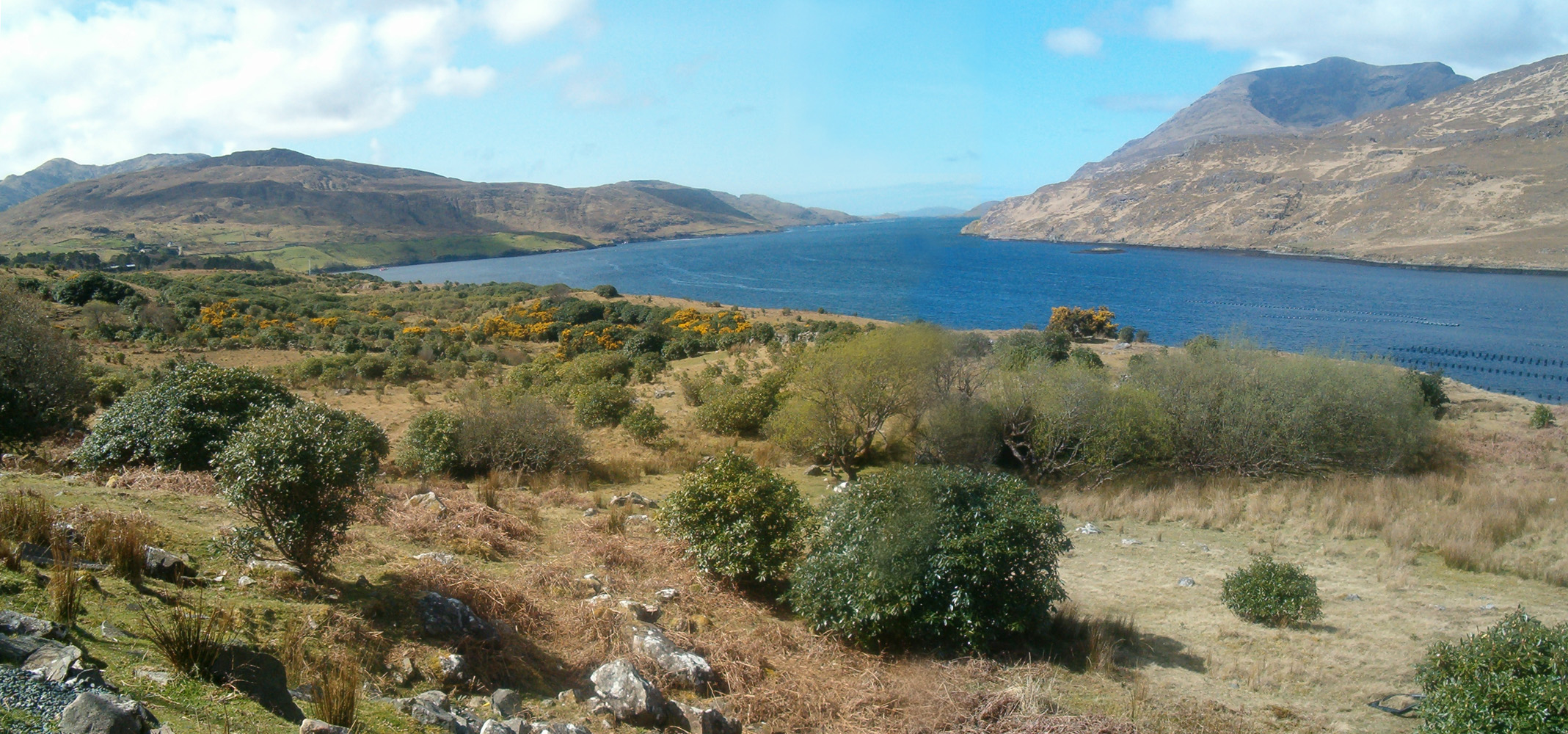
Killary Harbour forms a natural border between counties Galway and Mayo for 16 kilometres (9.9 mi)

In County Donegal, Lough Swilly separates the western side of the Inishowen peninsula from the wider county. Lough Foyle on the other side, is one of Ireland's larger inlets, situated between County Donegal and County Londonderry. Clockwise round the coast is Belfast Lough, between County Antrim and County Down. Also in County Down is Strangford Lough, actually an inlet partially separating the Ards peninsula from the mainland. Further south, Carlingford Lough is situated between Down and County Louth.

Dublin Bay is the next sizeable inlet. The east coast of Ireland has no major inlets until Wexford Harbour at the mouth of the River Slaney. On the south coast, Waterford Harbour is situated at the mouth of the River Suir, into which the other two of the Three Sisters (the Rivers Nore and Barrow) flow. The next major inlet is Cork Harbour, at the mouth of the River Lee, in which Great Island is situated.

Dunmanus Bay, Kenmare estuary and Dingle Bay are all inlets between the peninsulas of western County Cork and County Kerry. North of these is the Shannon Estuary. Between north County Clare and County Galway is Galway Bay. Clew Bay is located on the coast of County Mayo, south of Achill Island, while Broadhaven Bay, Blacksod Bay and Sruth Fada Conn bays are situated in northwest Connacht, in North Mayo. Killala Bay is on the northeast coast of Mayo. Donegal Bay is a major inlet between County Donegal and County Sligo.

A recent global remote sensing analysis suggested that there were 565 km^{2} (218 sq mi) of tidal flats in Ireland, making it the 43rd-ranked country in terms of tidal flat area.

=== Headlands ===
Malin Head is the most northerly point in Ireland, while Mizen Head is one of the most southern points, hence the term "from Malin to Mizen" (or the reverse) is used for anything applying to the island of Ireland as a whole. Carnsore Point is another extreme point of Ireland, being its southeasternmost point. Hook Head and the Old Head of Kinsale are two of many headlands along the south coast. Loop Head is the headland at which County Clare comes to a point on the west coast of Ireland, with the Atlantic on the north, and the Shannon estuary to the south. Hag's Head is another headland further up Clare's north/western coastline, with the Cliffs of Moher along the coastline north of the point.

=== Islands and peninsulas ===
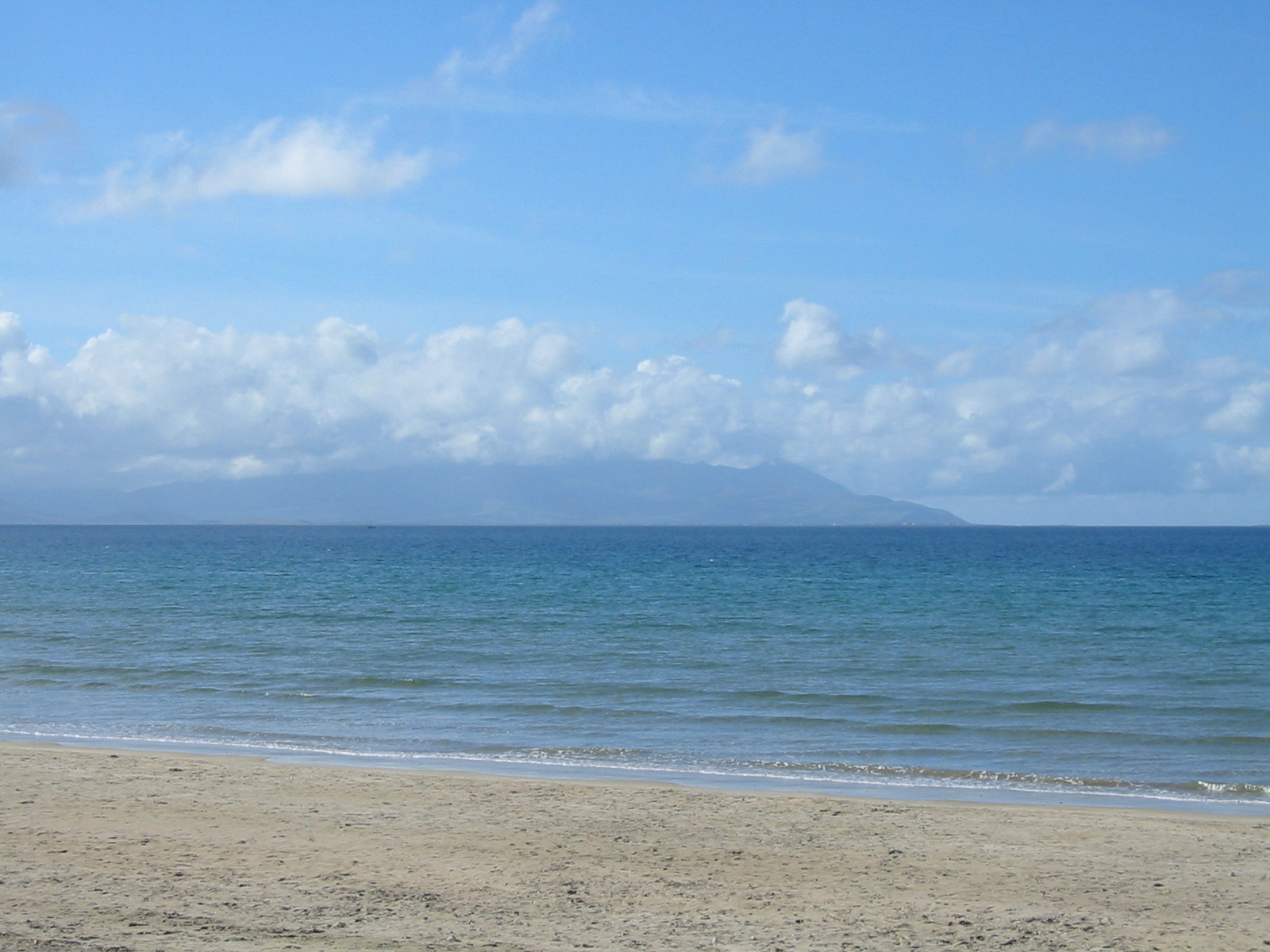
Dingle Peninsula as viewed from Banna Strand

Achill Island, off the west coast, is the largest of Ireland's offshore islands. Achill is inhabited, and is permanently connected to the mainland by a bridge. Some of the next largest islands are the Aran Islands, off the coast of southern Connacht, host to an Irish-speaking community, or Gaeltacht. Valentia Island off the Iveragh peninsula is also one of Ireland's larger islands, and is relatively settled, as well as being connected by a bridge at its southeastern end. Omey Island, off the coast of Connemara, is a tidal island.

Some of the best-known peninsulas in Ireland are in Counties Cork and Kerry: the Dingle peninsula, the Iveragh peninsula and the Beara peninsula. Other promontories outside the southwest include the Fanad (Fannet Head), Mullet Peninsula, the Old Head of Kinsale, Hook Head, Howth Head and the Cooley Peninsula. The Inishowen peninsula in County Donegal includes Ireland's most northerly point, Malin Head, and several towns, including Buncrana on Lough Swilly, Carndonagh and Moville on Lough Foyle.

Ireland's most northerly undisputed land feature is Inishtrahull island, off Malin Head. Rockall Island lies farther north but its status is disputed, being claimed by the United Kingdom, Republic of Ireland, Denmark (on behalf of the Faroe Islands) and Iceland. The most southerly point is the Fastnet Rock.

The Hebrides off Scotland and Anglesey off Wales were grouped with Ireland ("Hibernia") by the Greco-Roman geographer Ptolemy.

=== Forests ===
Like much of Atlantic Europe, Ireland was once covered in temperate rainforest. Deforestation began in the Neolithic Age with the arrival of early farmers and the introduction of agriculture, and accelerated following the Plantations of Ireland, resulting in forest cover of only 1% by the end of the nineteenth century. As of 2017, total tree cover in the Republic of Ireland stood at 11% of land area but the figure for native forest stood at just 2% in 2018, the third lowest in Europe, behind Iceland and Malta. Of the 172 countries assessed, Ireland has the sixth most degraded forest landscape in the world.

=== Marine geography ===
The coastline of Ireland is 7,524 kilometres (4,675 mi) long. As the continental shelf extends far to the west and southwest, the larger of the two jurisdictions on the island has extensive seabed claims, exceeding 880,000 square kilometres (340,000 sq mi), more than 10 times the land area.

== Climate ==
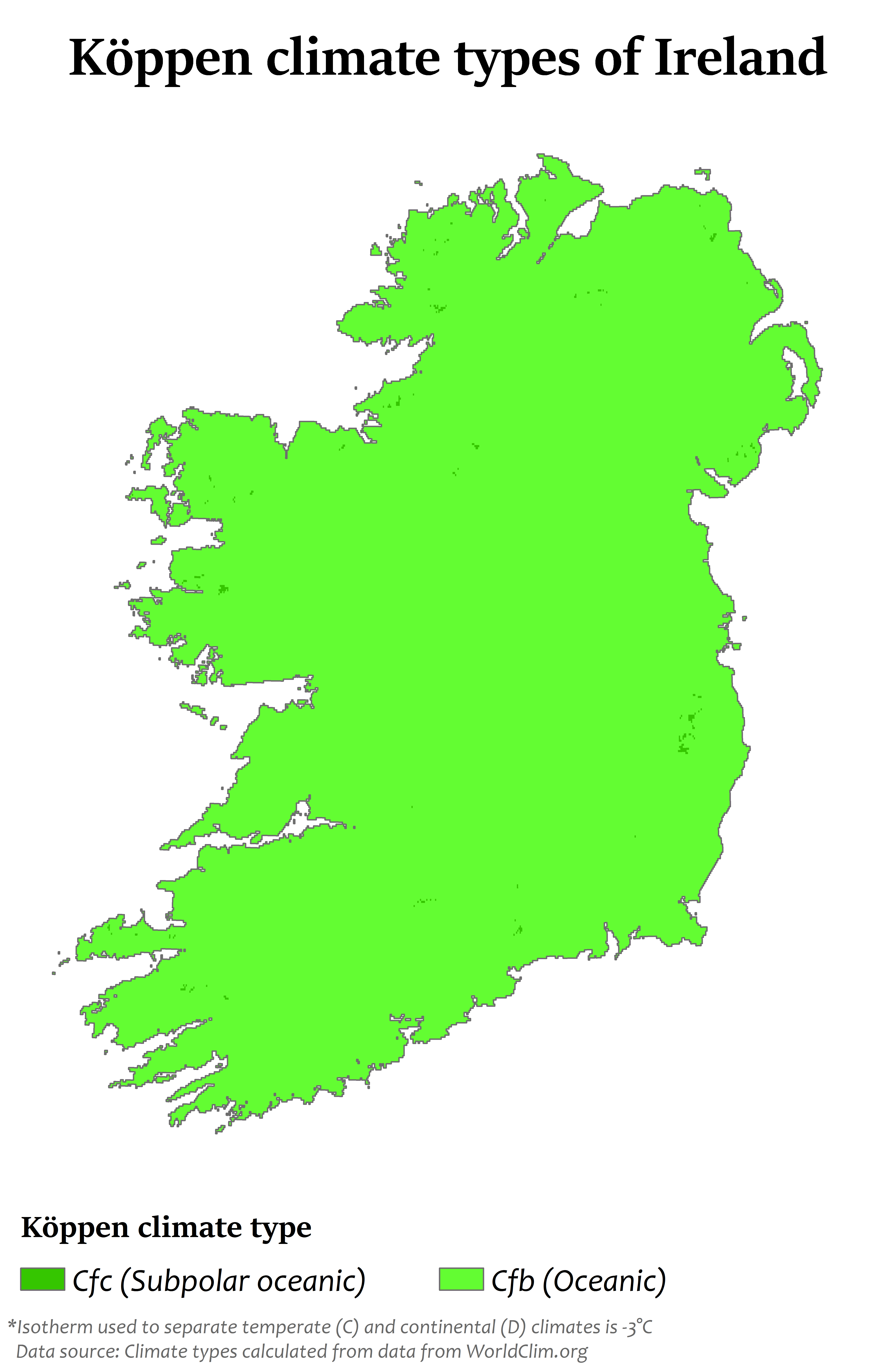
Köppen climate types in Ireland

The climate of Ireland is mild, humid and changeable with abundant rainfall and a lack of temperature extremes. Ireland's climate is defined as a temperate oceanic climate, or Cfb on the Köppen climate classification system, a classification it shares with most of northwest Europe. The country receives generally warm summers and mild winters. It is considerably warmer than other areas at the same latitude on the other side of the Atlantic, such as in Newfoundland, because it lies downwind of the Atlantic Ocean, and is also warmer than maritime climates near the same latitude, such as the Pacific Northwest, as a result of heat released by the Atlantic overturning circulation that includes the North Atlantic Current and Gulf Stream. For comparison, Dublin is 9 °C warmer than St. John's in Newfoundland in winter.

The influence of the North Atlantic Current also ensures the coastline of Ireland remains ice-free throughout the winter. The climate in Ireland does not experience extreme weather, with tornadoes and similar weather features being rare. However, Ireland is prone to eastward moving cyclones which come in from the North Atlantic.

The prevailing wind comes from the southwest, breaking on the high mountains of the west coast. Rainfall is therefore a particularly prominent part of western Irish life, with Valentia Island, off the west coast of County Kerry, getting over twice as much annual rainfall as Dublin on the east (1,557 mm or 61.3 in vs. 714 mm or 28.1 in).

The overall mean temperature (measured 1990–2020) is 9.8 °C (49.6 °F). January and February are the coldest months of the year, with mean daily air temperatures of 5.3 to 5.5 °C (41.5 to 41.9 °F) during these months. July and August are the warmest, with mean daily temperatures of 15 to 15.2 °C (59.0 to 59.4 °F), whilst mean daily maximums in July and August are 18.9 to 19.1 °C (66.0 to 66.4 °F), lower near the coast, higher inland. The sunniest months are May and June, with an average of five to seven hours sunshine per day.

Though extreme weather events in Ireland are comparatively rare when compared with other countries in the European Continent, they do occur. Atlantic depressions, occurring mainly in the months of December, January and February, can occasionally bring winds of up to 160 km/h or 99 mph to Western coastal counties; while the summer months, and particularly around late July/early August, thunderstorms can develop.

The tables below show mean 30-year climate averages for Ireland's two largest cities, taken from the weather stations at Dublin Airport and Belfast International Airport respectively. The state metrological service for the Republic of Ireland is Met Éireann, while the Met Office monitors climate data for Northern Ireland.

Climate data for Dublin Airport (DUB), (Note: Weather station is located 8.2 kilometres (5.1 mi) from the Dublin city centre.) 1991–2020 normals, extremes 1939-present
| Month | Jan | Feb | Mar | Apr | May | Jun | Jul | Aug | Sep | Oct | Nov | Dec | Year |
|---|---|---|---|---|---|---|---|---|---|---|---|---|---|
| Record high °C (°F) | 16.6 (61.9) | 16.2 (61.2) | 21.3 (70.3) | 21.7 (71.1) | 24.1 (75.4) | 27.6 (81.7) | 29.1 (84.4) | 28.7 (83.7) | 26.1 (79.0) | 21.2 (70.2) | 18.0 (64.4) | 17.1 (62.8) | 29.1 (84.4) |
| Mean daily maximum °C (°F) | 8.0 (46.4) | 8.5 (47.3) | 10.1 (50.2) | 12.3 (54.1) | 14.8 (58.6) | 17.7 (63.9) | 19.5 (67.1) | 19.1 (66.4) | 16.9 (62.4) | 13.6 (56.5) | 10.3 (50.5) | 8.3 (46.9) | 13.3 (55.9) |
| Daily mean °C (°F) | 5.2 (41.4) | 5.3 (41.5) | 6.6 (43.9) | 8.2 (46.8) | 10.7 (51.3) | 13.3 (55.9) | 15.4 (59.7) | 15.1 (59.2) | 13.2 (55.8) | 10.4 (50.7) | 7.3 (45.1) | 5.5 (41.9) | 9.7 (49.5) |
| Mean daily minimum °C (°F) | 2.3 (36.1) | 2.2 (36.0) | 3.0 (37.4) | 4.0 (39.2) | 6.6 (43.9) | 9.0 (48.2) | 11.3 (52.3) | 11.2 (52.2) | 9.5 (49.1) | 7.1 (44.8) | 4.3 (39.7) | 2.6 (36.7) | 6.1 (43.0) |
| Record low °C (°F) | −10.7 (12.7) | −10.9 (12.4) | −7.9 (17.8) | −5.6 (21.9) | −3.0 (26.6) | 1.4 (34.5) | 3.9 (39.0) | 2.4 (36.3) | −0.2 (31.6) | −4.3 (24.3) | −8.4 (16.9) | −12.2 (10.0) | −12.2 (10.0) |
| Average precipitation mm (inches) | 61.8 (2.43) | 52.4 (2.06) | 51.4 (2.02) | 55.0 (2.17) | 57.0 (2.24) | 64.0 (2.52) | 61.0 (2.40) | 73.4 (2.89) | 63.3 (2.49) | 78.4 (3.09) | 82.7 (3.26) | 72.1 (2.84) | 772.5 (30.41) |
| Average precipitation days (≥ 1.0 mm) | 12.5 | 11.0 | 10.7 | 11.1 | 10.5 | 9.8 | 11.6 | 11.8 | 10.7 | 11.6 | 12.5 | 13.3 | 137.1 |
| Average snowy days | 3.2 | 3.2 | 2.4 | 0.7 | 0.1 | 0.0 | 0.0 | 0.0 | 0.0 | 0.0 | 0.6 | 2.3 | 12.5 |
| Average relative humidity (%) | 85.6 | 84.0 | 81.8 | 80.0 | 78.7 | 78.5 | 80.0 | 81.2 | 83.0 | 84.3 | 86.8 | 87.1 | 82.6 |
| Average dew point °C (°F) | 3.2 (37.8) | 3.0 (37.4) | 3.6 (38.5) | 4.8 (40.6) | 7.1 (44.8) | 9.7 (49.5) | 11.6 (52.9) | 11.6 (52.9) | 10.2 (50.4) | 7.8 (46.0) | 5.5 (41.9) | 3.8 (38.8) | 6.8 (44.2) |
| Mean monthly sunshine hours | 59.1 | 81.4 | 115.1 | 161.4 | 199.2 | 179.2 | 156.5 | 155.8 | 130.5 | 105.3 | 73.1 | 53.9 | 1,470.5 |
Source 1: Met Éireann
Source 2: NOAA Servizio Meteorologico (extremes)

Climate data for Casement Aerodrome (Note: Weather station is located 13.2 kilometres (8.2 mi) from the Dublin city centre.) (1991-2020 normals, extremes 1958-present)
| Month | Jan | Feb | Mar | Apr | May | Jun | Jul | Aug | Sep | Oct | Nov | Dec | Year |
|---|---|---|---|---|---|---|---|---|---|---|---|---|---|
| Record high °C (°F) | 15.4 (59.7) | 17.2 (63.0) | 21.0 (69.8) | 24.1 (75.4) | 25.4 (77.7) | 29.4 (84.9) | 31.9 (89.4) | 31.2 (88.2) | 27.3 (81.1) | 23.4 (74.1) | 17.7 (63.9) | 15.4 (59.7) | 31.9 (89.4) |
| Mean daily maximum °C (°F) | 8.0 (46.4) | 8.5 (47.3) | 10.3 (50.5) | 12.4 (54.3) | 15.4 (59.7) | 18.0 (64.4) | 19.8 (67.6) | 19.4 (66.9) | 17.0 (62.6) | 13.7 (56.7) | 10.3 (50.5) | 8.3 (46.9) | 13.4 (56.1) |
| Daily mean °C (°F) | 5.2 (41.4) | 5.3 (41.5) | 6.7 (44.1) | 8.5 (47.3) | 11.2 (52.2) | 13.8 (56.8) | 15.7 (60.3) | 15.4 (59.7) | 13.3 (55.9) | 10.4 (50.7) | 7.4 (45.3) | 5.4 (41.7) | 9.9 (49.8) |
| Mean daily minimum °C (°F) | 2.4 (36.3) | 2.2 (36.0) | 3.1 (37.6) | 4.5 (40.1) | 6.9 (44.4) | 9.6 (49.3) | 11.6 (52.9) | 11.4 (52.5) | 9.6 (49.3) | 7.2 (45.0) | 4.4 (39.9) | 2.6 (36.7) | 6.3 (43.3) |
| Record low °C (°F) | −13.2 (8.2) | −10.3 (13.5) | −9.8 (14.4) | −5.9 (21.4) | −3.6 (25.5) | −0.7 (30.7) | 2.5 (36.5) | 1.5 (34.7) | −0.3 (31.5) | −4.1 (24.6) | −9.1 (15.6) | −15.7 (3.7) | −15.7 (3.7) |
| Average precipitation mm (inches) | 65.0 (2.56) | 55.2 (2.17) | 51.8 (2.04) | 55.3 (2.18) | 59.1 (2.33) | 65.7 (2.59) | 59.4 (2.34) | 71.2 (2.80) | 61.6 (2.43) | 81.6 (3.21) | 81.9 (3.22) | 75.7 (2.98) | 783.5 (30.85) |
| Average precipitation days (≥ 1.0 mm) | 12.3 | 11.4 | 10.2 | 10.9 | 10.5 | 10.1 | 11.9 | 11.5 | 10.0 | 12.0 | 12.4 | 13.2 | 136.4 |
| Average snowy days | 3.2 | 3.1 | 2.2 | 0.7 | 0.1 | 0.0 | 0.0 | 0.0 | 0.0 | 0.0 | 0.6 | 2.0 | 11.9 |
| Average relative humidity (%) | 86.1 | 84.5 | 82.0 | 79.4 | 78.2 | 78.6 | 80.5 | 81.7 | 83.3 | 84.9 | 87.2 | 87.3 | 82.8 |
| Average dew point °C (°F) | 3.3 (37.9) | 3.0 (37.4) | 3.7 (38.7) | 4.9 (40.8) | 7.2 (45.0) | 9.9 (49.8) | 11.9 (53.4) | 11.9 (53.4) | 10.3 (50.5) | 7.9 (46.2) | 5.5 (41.9) | 3.8 (38.8) | 6.9 (44.4) |
| Mean monthly sunshine hours | 53.5 | 74.5 | 106.8 | 156.9 | 190.2 | 167.4 | 152.9 | 153.4 | 125.3 | 101.8 | 66.9 | 47.6 | 1,397.2 |
Source 1: Met Éireann
Source 2: NOAA Servizio Meteorologico (extremes)

Climate data for Belfast International Airport WMO ID: 03917; coordinates 54°39′50″N 6°13′30″W; elevation: 63 m (207 ft); 1991–2020 normals, extremes 1930–present
| Month | Jan | Feb | Mar | Apr | May | Jun | Jul | Aug | Sep | Oct | Nov | Dec | Year |
|---|---|---|---|---|---|---|---|---|---|---|---|---|---|
| Record high °C (°F) | 14.5 (58.1) | 15.6 (60.1) | 20.2 (68.4) | 23.9 (75.0) | 26.1 (79.0) | 29.5 (85.1) | 30.8 (87.4) | 28.0 (82.4) | 27.1 (80.8) | 21.8 (71.2) | 17.1 (62.8) | 15.0 (59.0) | 30.8 (87.4) |
| Mean daily maximum °C (°F) | 7.3 (45.1) | 7.9 (46.2) | 9.7 (49.5) | 12.3 (54.1) | 15.2 (59.4) | 17.6 (63.7) | 19.1 (66.4) | 18.7 (65.7) | 16.6 (61.9) | 13.1 (55.6) | 9.8 (49.6) | 7.6 (45.7) | 12.9 (55.2) |
| Daily mean °C (°F) | 4.7 (40.5) | 4.9 (40.8) | 6.3 (43.3) | 8.5 (47.3) | 11.2 (52.2) | 13.8 (56.8) | 15.4 (59.7) | 15.2 (59.4) | 13.2 (55.8) | 10.2 (50.4) | 7.1 (44.8) | 5.0 (41.0) | 9.6 (49.3) |
| Mean daily minimum °C (°F) | 2.1 (35.8) | 2.0 (35.6) | 3.0 (37.4) | 4.7 (40.5) | 7.1 (44.8) | 9.9 (49.8) | 11.8 (53.2) | 11.7 (53.1) | 9.9 (49.8) | 7.2 (45.0) | 4.4 (39.9) | 2.4 (36.3) | 6.4 (43.5) |
| Record low °C (°F) | −12.8 (9.0) | −11.7 (10.9) | −12.2 (10.0) | −5.1 (22.8) | −3.3 (26.1) | −1.2 (29.8) | 2.2 (36.0) | 1.7 (35.1) | −2.2 (28.0) | −3.9 (25.0) | −8.6 (16.5) | −14.9 (5.2) | −14.9 (5.2) |
| Average precipitation mm (inches) | 77.0 (3.03) | 63.3 (2.49) | 60.6 (2.39) | 55.6 (2.19) | 55.9 (2.20) | 68.0 (2.68) | 78.8 (3.10) | 84.5 (3.33) | 69.2 (2.72) | 88.0 (3.46) | 87.7 (3.45) | 83.5 (3.29) | 872.0 (34.33) |
| Average precipitation days (≥ 1.0 mm) | 14.7 | 13.2 | 13.0 | 12.0 | 11.6 | 11.9 | 14.1 | 14.2 | 12.1 | 14.0 | 15.5 | 15.2 | 161.3 |
| Average snowy days | 5 | 5 | 4 | 1 | 0 | 0 | 0 | 0 | 0 | 0 | 1 | 3 | 19 |
| Average relative humidity (%) | 89 | 87 | 88 | 89 | 90 | 90 | 90 | 92 | 92 | 91 | 90 | 89 | 91 |
| Mean monthly sunshine hours | 48.7 | 72.1 | 108.4 | 157.8 | 197.9 | 167.6 | 152.0 | 146.4 | 121.5 | 91.2 | 61.3 | 47.1 | 1,372 |
Source 1: Met Office NOAA (relative humidity and snow days 1961–-1990)
Source 2: Servizio Meteorologico (extremes)

== Political and human geography ==
Ireland is divided into four provinces—Connacht, Leinster, Munster and Ulster—and 32 counties. Six of the nine Ulster counties form Northern Ireland and the other 26 form the state, Ireland. The map shows all 32 counties.

(Republic of) Ireland
1. Dublin
2. Wicklow
3. Wexford
4. Carlow
5. Kildare
6. Meath
7. Louth
8. Monaghan
9. Cavan
10. Longford
11. Westmeath
12. Offaly
13. Laois
14. Kilkenny
15. Waterford
16. Cork
17. Kerry
18. Limerick
19. Tipperary
20. Clare
21. Galway
22. Mayo
23. Roscommon
24. Sligo
25. Leitrim
26. Donegal

Northern Ireland

1. Fermanagh
2. Tyrone
3. Londonderry (Derry)
4. Antrim
5. Down
6. Armagh

Administratively, 23 of the counties in the Republic of Ireland are local government areas. Three contain more than one local government areas: the cities of Dublin, Cork and Galway have city councils that are administered separately from the counties bearing those names, and the remaining part of County Dublin is divided into Dún Laoghaire–Rathdown, Fingal, and South Dublin. There are therefore a total of 31 local authorities.

County Tipperary had two ridings, North Tipperary and South Tipperary, originally established in 1838, renamed in 2001 and amalgamated in 2014. The cities of Limerick and Waterford were merged with their respective county councils in 2014 to form new city and county councils.

In making its recommendations on changes to Dáil constituencies, the Electoral Commission is required to avoid breaching county boundaries as far as practicable.

In Northern Ireland, a major re-organisation of local government in 1973 replaced the six traditional counties and two county boroughs (Belfast and Derry) with 26 single-tier districts, which, apart from Fermanagh, cross the traditional county boundaries. The six counties and two county boroughs remain in use for purposes such as Lieutenancy. Under a further reform in 2015, this was revised into 11 areas: the city of Belfast and 10 districts.

According to separate censuses conducted in 2021 and 2022, the island's population is over 7 million people concentrated in the east and south, particularly in Dublin, Belfast, Cork and their surrounding areas. The 2021 United Kingdom census recorded a population in Northern Ireland of 1,903,175 and the 2022 Irish census recorded a population of the Republic of Ireland of 5,149,139.

== Natural resources ==
=== Fens and bogs ===
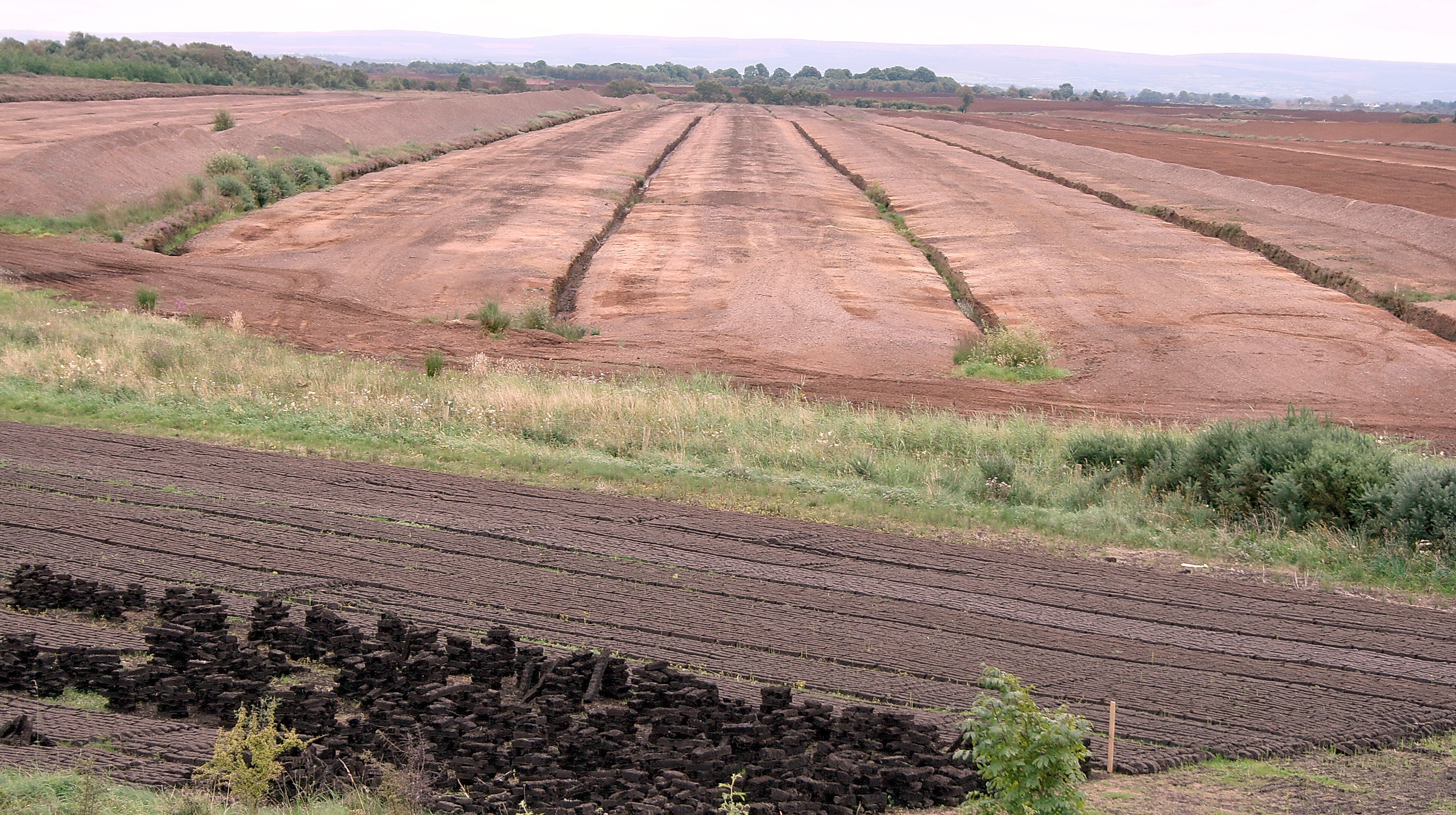
Bord na Móna peat-harvesting in the Bog of Allen

Ireland has 12,000 km^{2} (about 4,600 sq miles) of bog land, consisting of two distinct types: blanket bogs and raised bogs. There is also a modest amount of surviving fen, a related landform.

Raised bogs, most commonly found in the Shannon basin, are scarcer than blanket bogs. They formed when depressions left behind after the ice age filled with water to form lakes. Debris from reeds in these lakes formed a layer of at the bottom of the water. This eventually choked the lakes and raised above the surface, forming raised bogs.

Blanket bogs are essentially a product of human activity aided by the moist Irish climate, having formed on sites where Neolithic farmers cleared trees for farming. As the land so cleared fell into disuse, the soil began to leach and become more acidic, producing a suitable environment for the growth of heather and rushes. The debris from these plants accumulated and a layer of peat formed. One of the largest expanses of Atlantic blanket bog in Ireland is to be found in County Mayo.

==== Usage and concerns ====
Since the 17th century, peat has been cut for fuel for domestic heating and cooking, and it is called turf when so used. The process accelerated as commercial exploitation of bogs grew. In the 1940s, machines for cutting turf were introduced and larger-scale harvesting became possible. In the Republic, this became the responsibility of a semi-state company called Bord na Móna. In addition to domestic uses, commercially extracted turf is used in a number of industries, producing peat briquettes for domestic fuel and milled peat for electricity generation. More recently peat is being combined with biomass for dual-firing electricity generation.

In recent years, the destruction of bogs has raised environmental concerns. The issue is particularly acute for raised bogs which were more widely mined as they yield a higher-grade fuel than blanket bogs. Plans are now in place in both the Republic and Northern Ireland to conserve most of the remaining raised bogs on the island.

=== Oil, natural gas and minerals ===
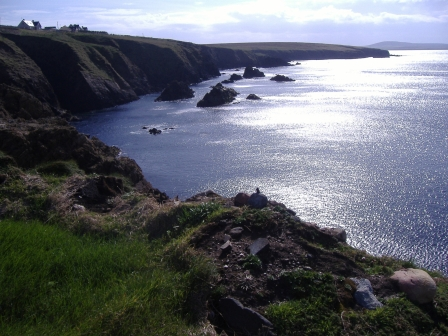
The Corrib gas project pipeline makes landfall at Glengad, County Mayo

Ireland is the largest European producer of zinc, with one zinc-lead mine currently in operation at Tara, which is Europe's largest and deepest active mine. Other mineral deposits with actual or potential commercial value include gold, silver, gypsum, talc, calcite, dolomite, roofing slate, limestone aggregate, building stone, sand, and gravel.

==== Hydrocarbons ====
Offshore exploration for natural gas began in 1970. The first major discovery was the Kinsale Head gas field in 1971. Next were the smaller Ballycotton gas field in 1989, and the Corrib gas field in 1996. Gas from these fields is pumped ashore and used for both domestic and industrial purposes. The Helvick oil field, estimated to contain over 28 million barrels (4,500,000 m^{3}) of oil, was discovered in 2000, and Barryroe, estimated to contain 1.6 billion barrels (250,000,000 m3) of oil, was discovered in 2012, although neither have been exploited. In May 2007 the Department of Communications, Marine and Natural Resources (now replaced by the Department of Communications, Energy and Natural Resources) reported that there may be volumes over 130 billion barrels (2.1×10^{10} m^{3}) of petroleum and 50 trillion cubic feet (1,400 km^{3}) of natural gas in Irish waters – worth trillions of euro, if true. The minimum confirmed amount of oil in the Irish Atlantic waters is 10 billion barrels (1.6×10^{9} m^{3}), worth over €450 billion. There are also areas of petroleum and natural gas on shore, for example the Lough Allen basin, with 9.4 trillion cubic feet (270 km^{3}) of gas and 1.5 billion barrels (240,000,000 m^{3}) of oil, valued at €74.4 billion. Already some fields are being exploited, such as the Spanish Point field, with 1.25 trillion cubic feet (35 km^{3}) of gas and 206 million barrels (32,800,000 m^{3}) of oil, valued at €19.6 billion. The Corrib Basin is also quite large, worth anything up to €87 billion, while the Dunquin gas field, initially estimated to have 25 trillion cubic feet (710 km^{3}) of natural gas and 4.13 billion barrels (657,000,000 m^{3}) of petroleum but 2012 revised estimates suggest only 14 trillion cubic feet (400 km^{3}) of natural gas and .5 billion barrels (79,000,000 m^{3}) of oil condensate.

In March 2012, the first commercial oil well was drilled 70 km (43 mi) off the Cork coast by Providence Resources, renamed Barryroe Offshore. At the time, Providence's executive Tony O'Reilly Jr. said, "It's a defining moment for the Irish offshore oil and gas industry." The Barryroe oil well was yielding 3,500 barrels per day in exploratory drilling; at oil prices of $120 a barrel, Barryroe oil well was worth in excess of €2.14bn annually in 2012. However, in 2023, the Department of the Environment, Climate and Communications declined approval of the "Lease Undertaking" that would be necessary to finish appraisal drilling, and Barryroe Offshore Energy will now wind down their business by a voluntary liquidation so the field may not be developed. Legal action may be taken by investors against the Irish government including the minor 20% investor Lansdowne Oil & Gas.

=== Renewable energy ===
Under the original 2009 Renewable Energy Directive the Republic of Ireland had set a target of producing 16% of all its energy needs from renewable energy sources by 2020 but in 2018 the second Renewable Energy Directive increased the target to 32% by 2030. Between 2005 and 2014 the percentage of energy from renewable energy sources grew from just 3.1% to 8.6% of total final consumption. By 2020 the overall renewable energy share was 13.5%, short of its Renewable Energy Drive target of 16%. Renewable electricity accounted for 69% of all renewable energy used in 2020, up from two thirds (66.8%) in 2019.

==== Wind ====
Locations of wind farms on and around the island of Ireland

While hydro generated power contributed most to Ireland's renewable energy during the 20th century, so far in the 21st century there has been a significant increase in the production of energy by wind spurred by climate change concerns.

Bellacorick wind farm, built by Bord na Móna in 1992, was the first Irish wind farm with an individual turbine capacity of 0.3 MW which compared with the current capacity of 4–5 MW means that when turbines age out, replacements will produce significantly more power per installation. As of 2022 the Republic of Ireland had more than 300 wind farms but the number will have to double by 2030 if the current 40% of renewable energy is to double. Most of the energy will have to come from inshore wind farms because the sole offshore wind farm, Arklow Bank Wind Park, only produces 0.6% of the nation's total wind energy. The 80% target is an ambitious aspect of the Climate Action Plan some impediments, such as planning permission and the age of existing wind farms, may hinder this aspiration.

A floating 400 MW wind farm off the coast of Northern Ireland was proposed for the North Channel in 2022 to be operating by 2029. Another northern project, opened in October 2023, was set up under a corporate power purchase agreement in which Amazon, who backed the project, will be the off-taker of all the power produced by the 16-MW Ballykeel 7-turbine wind farm in County Antrim.

In November 2023, EDF Renewables announced their Carrowkeel Wind Farm which will be a 30 MW project for County Roscommon for completion in 2028 which should power more than 20,000 homes.

==== Solar energy ====
As of the 2020 Sustainable Energy Authority of Ireland report "Energy in Ireland", solar energy was only contributing 1% of renewable energy. Opposition to the visual impact of solar farms, and other forms of renewable energy, was noted as hindering some projects. DIT School of Electrical & Electronic Engineering's Professor Barry McMullin suggests that: "So while it's the cheapest form of electricity you can get that's only true if your demand for it happens to match when it's available. But if what you actually want is electricity on tap, then solar PV doesn't give you that".

Solar energy for about 3,600 homes has been in production with 33,600 solar modules installed on 25 hectares near Ashford, County Wicklow since April 2022. It is the first such venture at scale in the Republic of Ireland, with a capacity of 8 MW. A forecast from ESB Networks suggests that by the end of 2023, the country will be producing 1 GW. This is up from the 700 MW being produced in mid-summer from 60,000 micro-generation customers, adding to the 371 MW of utility-scale installations. 2013 saw a new 50 million Euro solar panel scheme specially for schools in eleven counties of the Republic, that should save typical schools between €1,200 to €1,600 per year. Connected to the grid, the up-to 6-kilowatt installation will be most efficient when the schools are not in use.

The first ground-based solar farm on the island is situated in the townland of Crookedstone, County Antrim, and is connected to Belfast International Airport, providing 27% of the airport's annual energy needs. This wind farm was built by Lightsource and BP bought full control of the company in November 2023 having first invested in the company in 2017.

==== Hydroelectric power ====
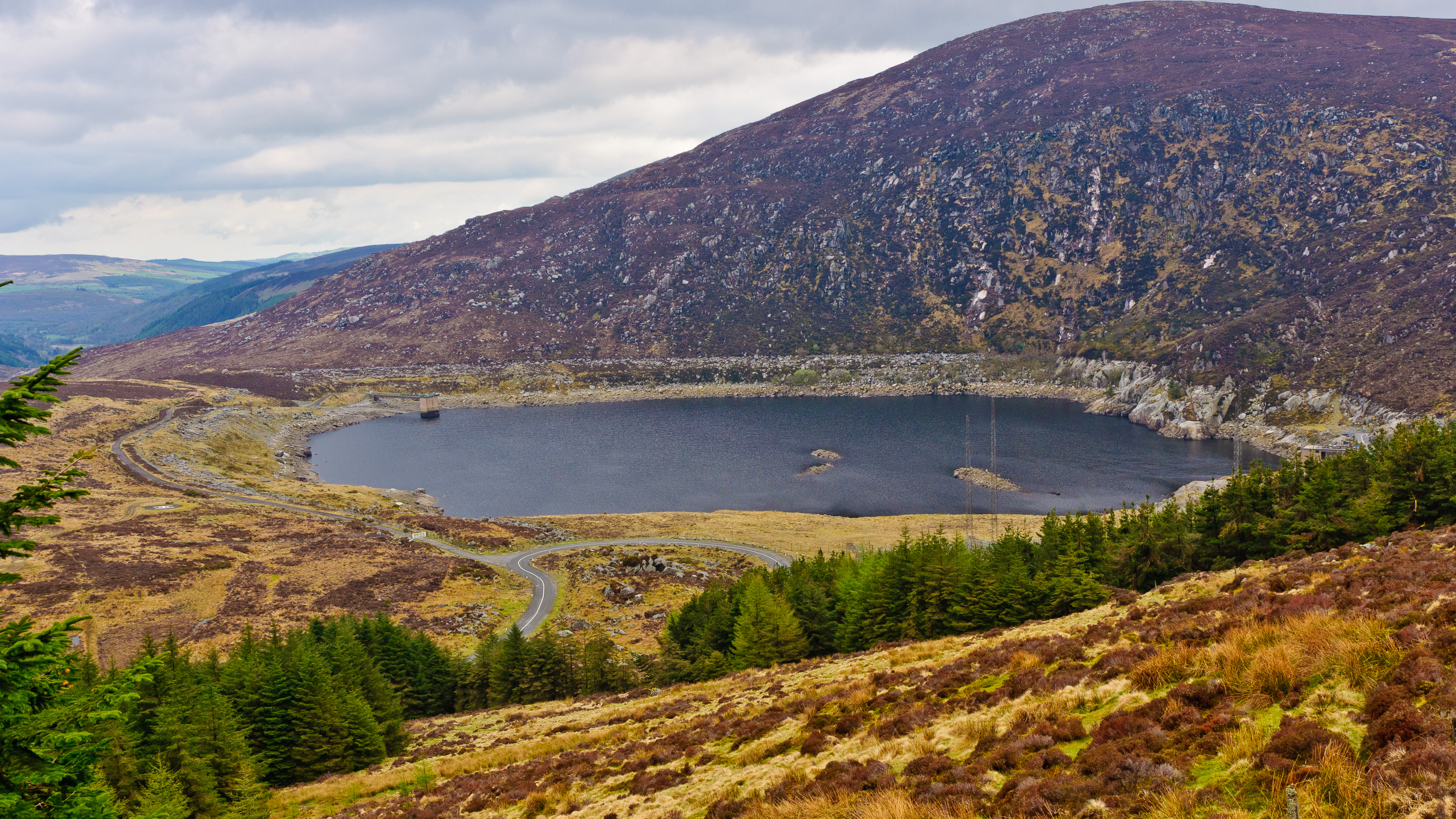
The lower reservoir of the Turlough Hill pumped-storage scheme

The first Shannon hydroelectric scheme was constructed in 1929 within seven years of independence. Built by Siemens-Schuckert with Irish engineers doing much of the design and using mostly Irish labour, it has an 86 MW capacity and has an annual generation capacity of 332 GWh. This was followed up by the much larger Turlough Hill Power Station, the only pumped-storage built into a mountain with a capacity of 292 MW. It was completed in 1974 after 6 years of construction. A few other smaller hydroelectric stations exist around the Republic of Ireland, such as Pollaphuca and Inniscarra Dam. Catherine Halpin, Ardnacrusha's plant manager, suggests the four main hydro plants are availing of about 70% of the country's water resources.

A tidal energy system is in operation since 2008 in Strangford Lough producing 1.2 MW using an underwater windmill, whose rotors at driven by the tidal currents. The power is bought for ESB Independent's Republic and Northern Ireland consumers. The system has a capacity to produce enough electricity for about 1,000 homes. Also in Northern Ireland, an Evopod tidal energy system has been tested and connected to the Marine Laboratory of Queen's University Belfast that should be connected to the electric grid.

== See also ==
- Coastal landforms of Ireland
- Conservation in Ireland
- Extreme points of Ireland
- List of national parks of Ireland
- Geographical centre of Ireland
- Gravity anomalies of Britain and Ireland

== Bibliography ==
=== Print ===
- Mitchell, Frank and Ryan, Michael. Reading the Irish landscape (1998). ISBN 978-1-86059-055-9
- Whittow, J. B. Geography and Scenery in Ireland (Penguin Books 1974)
- Holland, Charles, H and Sanders, Ian S. The Geology of Ireland 2nd ed. (2009). ISBN 978-1-903765-72-2
- Place-names, Diarmuid O Murchadha and Kevin Murray, in The Heritage of Ireland, ed. N. Buttimer et al., The Collins Press, Cork, 2000, pp. 146–155.
- A paper landscape:the Ordnance Survey in nineteenth-century Ireland, J.H. Andrews, London, 1975
- Monasticon Hibernicum, M. Archdall, 1786
- Etymological aetiology in Irish tradition, R. Baumgarten, Eiru 41, pp. 115–122, 1990
- The Origin and History of Irish names of Places, Patrick Weston Joyce, three volumes, Dublin, 1869, 1875, 1913.
- Irish Place Names, D. Flanagan and L. Flanagan, Dublin, 1994
- Census of Ireland:general alphabetical index to the townlands and towns, parishes and paronies of Ireland, Dublin, 1861
- The Placenames of Westmeath, Paul Walsh, 1957
- The Placenames of Decies, P. Power, Cork, 1952
- The place-names of county Wicklow, Liam Price, seven volumes, Dublin, 1945–67

=== Online ===
- Abbot, Patrick. Ireland's Peat Bogs. Retrieved on 23 January 2008.
- Ireland – The World Factbook. Central Intelligence Agency. Retrieved on 23 January 2008.
- OnlineWeather.com – climate details for Ireland. Retrieved 2011-01-12
