= Hag's Tooth =

Hag's Tooth may refer to:

- Hag's Tooth, Kerry, a 650 m peak in the Macgillycuddy's Reeks range in County Kerry, Ireland
- a rocky peak in Jelovica, a karst plateau in northwestern Slovenia
