= Regions of Ireland =

Regions of Ireland may refer to:

- Provinces of Ireland
- Counties of Ireland
- Local government in the Republic of Ireland
- NUTS statistical regions of Ireland
- Counties of Northern Ireland

== See also ==
- Geography of Ireland
