= EPRC =

EPRC may refer to:

- Economic Policy Research Center at Makerere University, Uganda
- Electrical Power Research Centre at DIT School of Electrical & Electronic Engineering, Ireland
- Emory University Prevention Research Center at Emory University, United States
- Endangered Primate Rescue Center, Vietnam
- Energy and Power Research Council, department of Ministry of Power, Energy and Mineral Resources, Bangladesh
- Escola Portuguesa Ruy Cinatti, international school in East Timor
- European Personnel Recovery Centre

== See also ==
- European Professional Club Rugby
