= DIT School of Electronic and Communications Engineering =

School of Electronic and Communications Engineering, DIT
- Irish: Scoil na hInnealtoireachta Leictreoinice agus Teilecumarsaide
- Established: 1911
- Affiliations: EUA
- Head of School: Dr. Gerald Farrell
- Faculty: 50
- Students: 2000
- Location: Dublin 8, Ireland
- Website: http://www.electronics.dit.ie

The School of Electronic and Communications Engineering (SECE) at the Dublin Institute of Technology (DIT) is one of the oldest schools of communications and electronic engineering in Ireland, with the first courses in wireless telegraphy inaugurated in 1911.

Other courses in Radio Communications were established prior to 1918 and were directed primarily at the requirements of Marine and Aircraft Radio Officers. In the late 1930s professional and more broadly based courses in Electronics and Radio Engineering were established. These professional courses prepared students for external examinations conducted by the British Institution of Radio Engineers (Brit IRE), which was renamed the Institution of Electronic and Radio Engineers (IERE) and finally merged in the 1980s with the Institution of Electrical Engineers (IEE). The Technician Courses were mainly directed towards qualifications of the City and Guilds of London Institute.

In the 1960s, the old building, which housed the School, was replaced with a new building. Also at that time, it was recognised that the City & Guilds examinations were inappropriate both in terms of level and subject matter for the purposes of technician graduates required by Irish and international industry. The absence of suitable external awards resulted in the decision of the College in 1967 to confer its own Diploma awards. The first diplomas were awarded in 1970. The successor to the original electronic engineering diploma courses was a three-year full-time ab initio diploma course entitled Diploma in Applied Electronics (Programme Reference DT287), validated in 1995. This is a technician engineering course with a significant level of analytical course content.

In 1982, a two-year course, entitled Technician Certificate in Electronics (Programme Ref. DT289), was established. This was in response to the demands from industry for technicians to work at a level which did not require the analytical approach of three-year ab-initio technician diploma courses offered by the Institute at that time. This was reviewed in 2000 and re-titled Certificate in Electronic and Computer Systems.

In 1996, the Diploma in Electronic Systems (Programme Ref. DT280) was added to the suite of programmes operated by the School. This programme was successfully revalidated in May 2002, with both full-time and part-time modes of study.

In 1999, a four-year Degree programme (Bachelor of Engineering) in Computer Engineering (Programme Ref. DT081) was inaugurated. The School is also jointly responsible with the DIT School of Control Systems and Electrical Engineering for the Degree Course (Bachelor of Engineering) in Electrical & Electronic Engineering (Programme Ref. DT021). In 2003 a new programme, DT008, commenced. DT008 is 3-year ordinary degree in Electronics and Communications Engineering. DIT SECE is an accredited regional Cisco Networking Academy (NetAcad).

== Programmes Offered ==
Full-time undergraduate programmes;

- DT081 B.E. (Hons) in Computer and Communications Engineering (4 years)
- DT021 B.E. (Hons) in Electrical / Electronic Engineering (4 years)
- DT008 B.Eng.Tech. in Electronics and Communications (3 years)
- DT080A Higher Certificate/Ordinary Degree in Network Technologies (2 years/3 years)
- DT089 Higher Certificate in Electronic and Computer Systems

Part-time undergraduate programmes;

- DT074 B.E. (Hons) in Computer and Communications Engineering
- DT079 B.Eng.Tech. in Electronic and Computer Systems
- DT082 Higher Certificate in Electronic and Computer Systems
- Upskill programme of bridging modules at higher certificate level

Postgraduate Masters;
Master's degree in Electronic and Communications Engineering:

- DT086 (full-time)
- DT085 (part-time)

== See also ==
- DIT School of Electrical & Electronic Engineering
