= Caher West Top =

Mountain in Kerry, Ireland

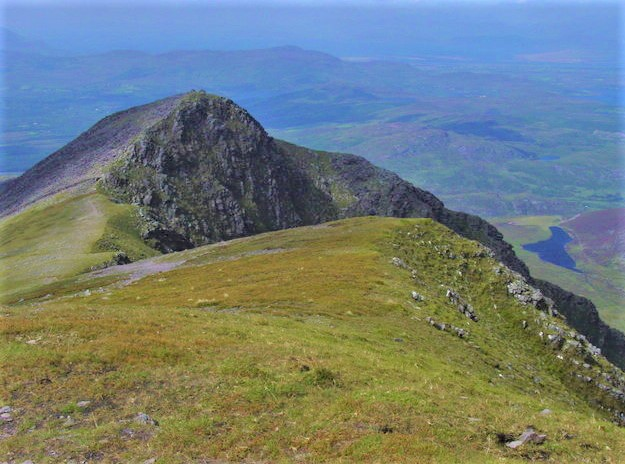
- Caher West Top from Caher

Highest point
- Elevation: 973.4 m (3,194 ft)
- Prominence: 24.05 m (78.9 ft)
- Listing: Vandeleur-Lynam, Furth
- Coordinates: 51°59′43″N 9°45′45″W

Geography
- Location within Ireland
- Location: County Kerry, Ireland
- Parent range: MacGillycuddy's Reeks
- OSI/OSNI grid: V790840
- Topo map: OSI Discovery 78

Geology
- Mountain type(s): Purple sandstone & siltstone, (Ballinskelligs Sandstone Formation)

Caher West Top (Irish: Cathair na Féinne, meaning 'stone fort of the Fianna') at 973.4 metres (3,193 ft 7 in), is the fifth-highest peak in Ireland on the Irish Vandeleur-Lynam classification, and part of the MacGillycuddy's Reeks range. Caher West Top is the only Furth to have a prominence below 30 metres (98 ft).

== Geography ==
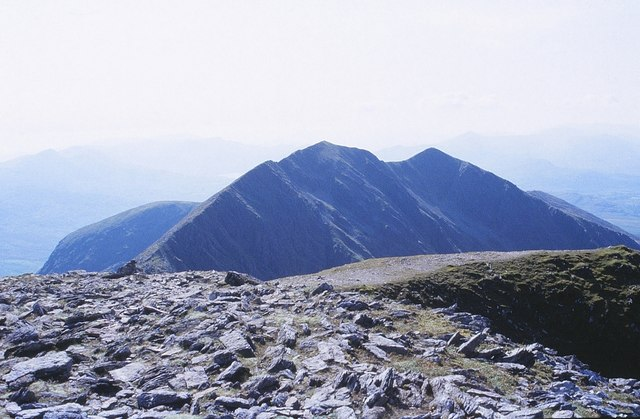
The full Caher Ridge, showing Caher (the tallest middle peak), and Caher West Top (rightmost peak), as seen from Carrauntoohil's summit

The mountain is located about 500 metres west of Caher East Top and is part of the MacGillycuddy's Reeks of County Kerry. Caher West Top is often climbed as part of the Coomloughra Horseshoe, which takes 6-8 hours and is described as "one of Ireland’s classic ridge walks". The horseshoe takes in other neighbouring peaks such as Carrauntoohil, Beenkeragh, The Bones (including the Beenkeragh Ridge), Skregmore, and Cnoc Iochtair.

Climbers refer to the narrow path that runs along the top of Caher West Top and neighboring Caher, as Caher Ridge.

Caher West Top is regarded by the Scottish Mountaineering Club ("SMC") as one of 34 Furths, which is a mountain above 3,000 ft (914.4 m) in elevation, and meets the other SMC criteria for a Munro (e.g. "sufficient separation"), but which is outside of (or furth) Scotland; which is why Caher West Top is sometimes referred to as one of the 13 Irish Munros; it is the only one of the 34 Furths on the official SMC list that has a topographic prominence below 30 metres (98 ft 5 in).

Because of Caher West Top's low prominence, it does not appear in the Irish Arderin classification, or the British Isles Simm and Hewitt classifications. Caher West Top does also not appear in the MountainViews Online Database, 100 Highest Irish Mountains, as the prominence threshold is 100 m (328 ft 1 in).

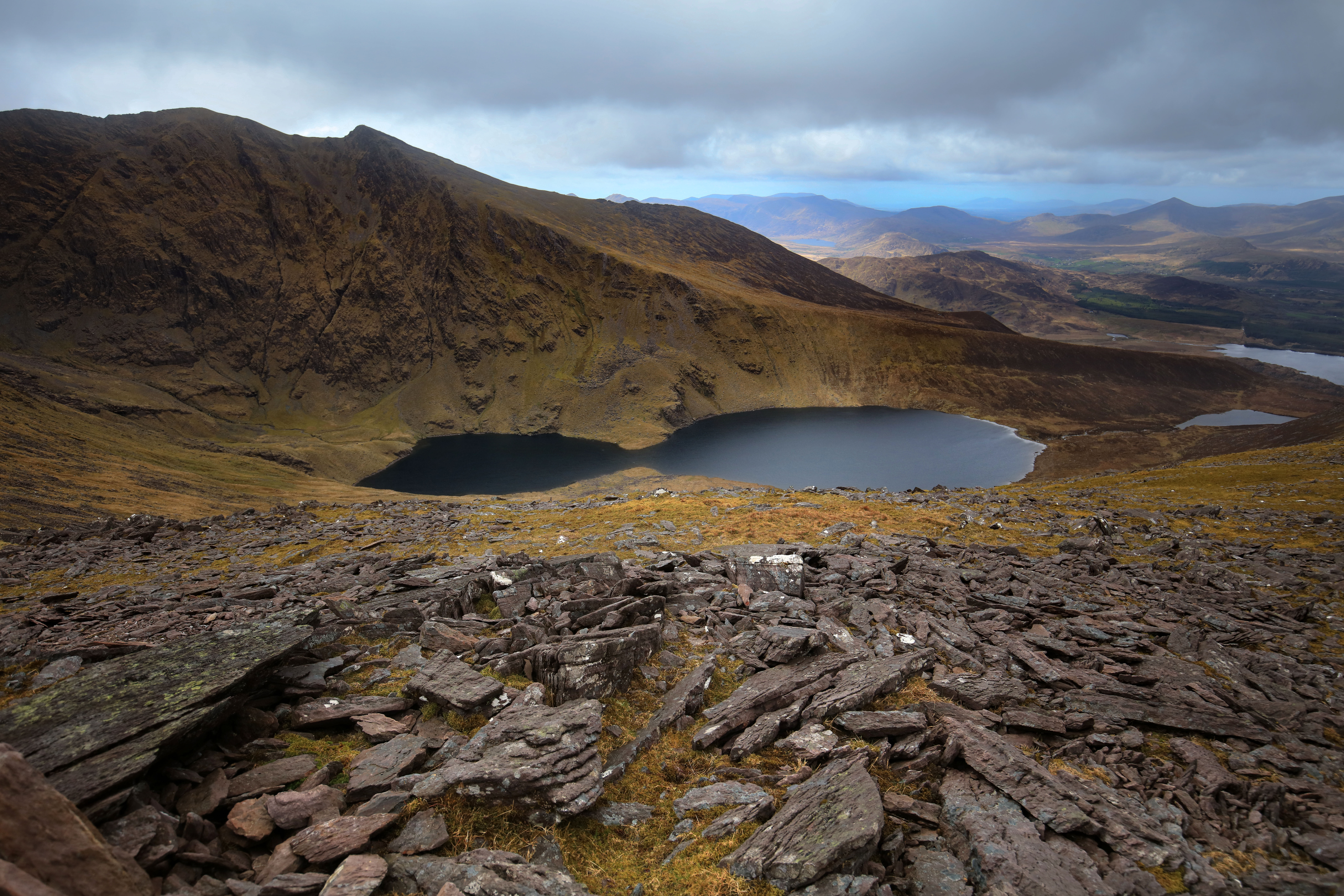
Caher East Top, and Caher West Top (the distinctive "spike"), as seen from across Lough Coomloughra from the summit of Stumpa Bharr na hAbhann.

== See also ==
- Lists of mountains in Ireland
- List of mountains of the British Isles by height
- List of Furth mountains in the British Isles
