= Beenkeragh =

Mountain in Kerry, Ireland

- Binn Chaorach
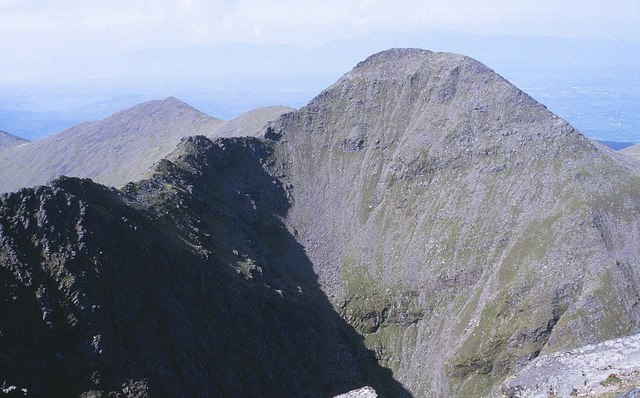
- Beenkeragh as viewed from the summit of Carrauntoohil; with the Beenkeragh Ridge (left)

Highest point
- Elevation: 1,008.2 m (3,308 ft)
- Prominence: 90.85 m (298.1 ft)
- Listing: Furth, Hewitt, Arderin, Simm, Vandeleur-Lynam
- Coordinates: 52°00′24″N 9°44′46″W

Geography
- Location within island of Ireland
- Location: County Kerry, Ireland
- Parent range: MacGillycuddy's Reeks
- OSI/OSNI grid: V801852
- Topo map: OSI Discovery 78

Geology
- Mountain type(s): Purple sandstone & siltstone, (Ballinskelligs Sandstone Formation)

Climbing
- Easiest route: via Hag's Tooth Ridge

Beenkeragh or Benkeeragh (Irish: Binn Chaorach, meaning 'sheep mountain') is the second-highest peak in Ireland, at 1,008.2 metres (3,308 ft). It is part of the MacGillycuddy's Reeks range in County Kerry. Beenkeragh also gives its name the infamous Beenkeragh Ridge, the narrow rocky arete between Beenkeragh and Carrauntoohil, Ireland's highest mountain.

== Geography ==
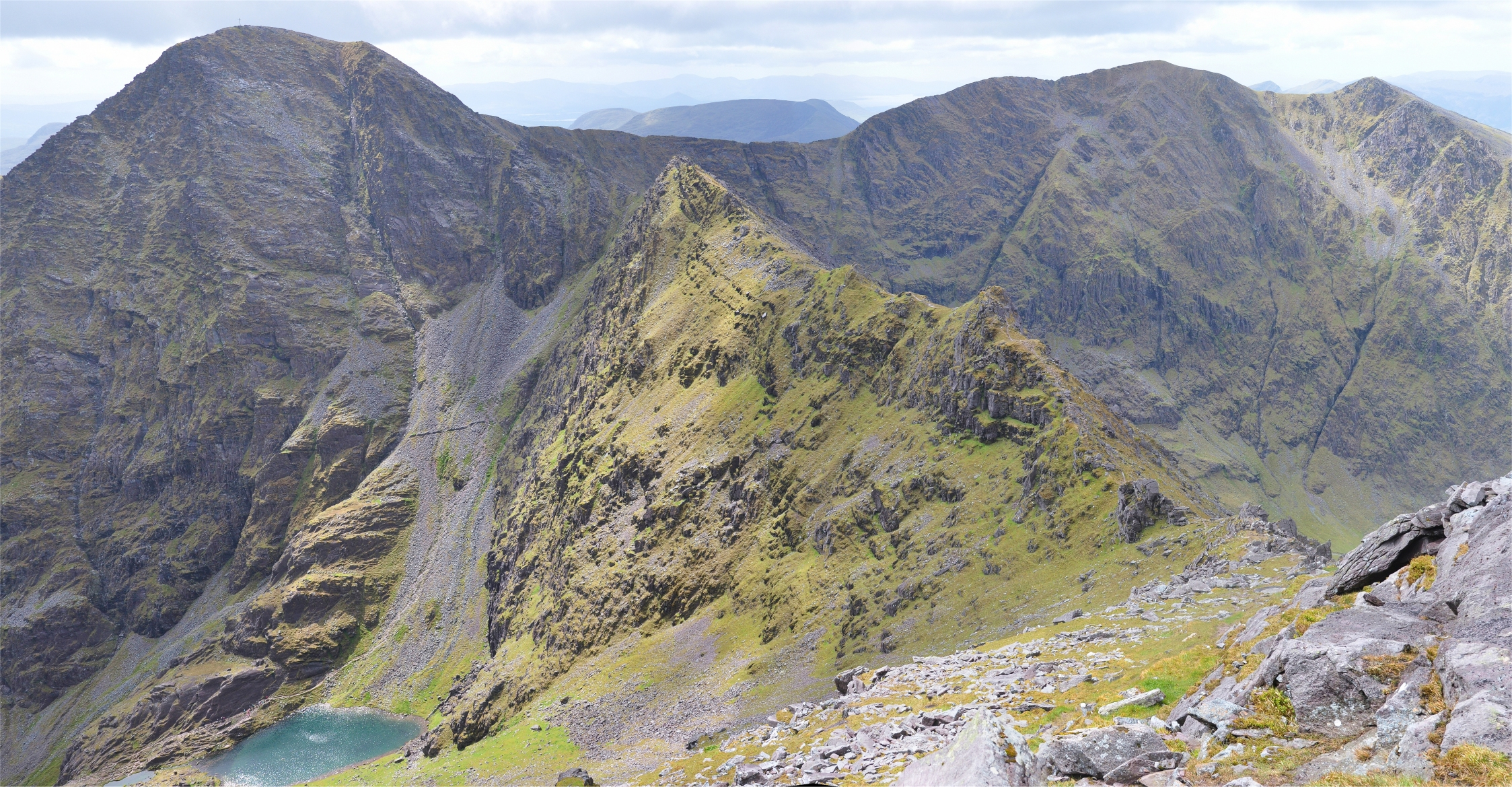
View from Beenkeragh of the Beenkeragh Ridge (with The Bones, in green, at its centre) to Carrauntoohil (left); back and right is Caher Ridge showing Caher East Top, and Caher West Top.

Beenkeragh lies to the north of Carrauntoohil 1,038.6 metres (3,407 ft)., and is part of the MacGillycuddy's Reeks range in County Kerry. Beenkeragh is joined to Carrauntoohil by a very narrow rocky ridge, or arete, known as the Beenkeragh Ridge. In the middle of the Beenkeragh Ridge is another other summit called, The Bones (Irish: Na Cnámha) 957 metres (3,140 ft).

Beenkeragh is the second-highest peak in Ireland, on both the Arderin and Vandeleur-Lynam lists. It is the 179th-highest mountain in Britain and Ireland on the Simm classification. Beenkeragh is regarded by the Scottish Mountaineering Club ("SMC") as one of 34 Furths, which is a mountain above 3,000 ft (914 m) in elevation, and meets the other SMC criteria for a Munro (e.g. "sufficient separation"), but which is outside of (or furth) Scotland; which is why Beenkeragh is sometimes referred to as one of the 13 Irish Munros.

Beenkeragh's prominence qualifies it to meet the Arderin classification, and the British Isles Simm and Hewitt classifications. Beenkeragh does not appear in the MountainViews Online Database, 100 Highest Irish Mountains, as the prominence threshold is over 100 m (328 ft).

== Climbing ==
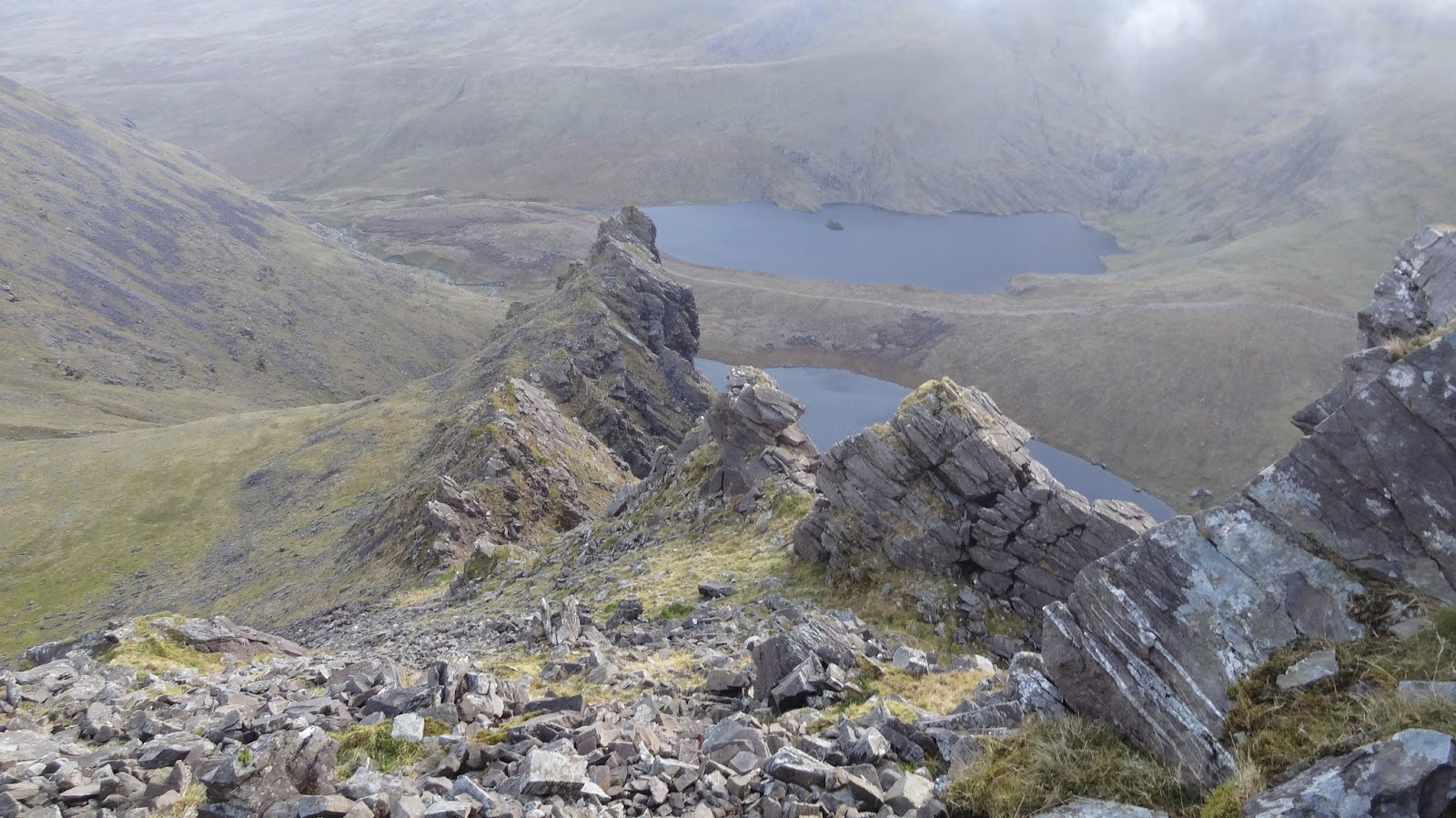
Looking back to the Hag's Tooth from the Hag's Tooth Ridge on the way to Beenkeragh

The Beenkeragh Ridge is considered as offering some of Ireland's "most intimidating" hill-walking, and is often climbed as part of the Coomloughra Horseshoe, described as "one of Ireland's finest ridge-walks". The horseshoe takes in Ireland's three highest mountains, Carrauntoohil, Beenkeragh, and Caher.

Beenkeragh is also accessed from the south-east via the Hag's Glen by ascending the Hag's Tooth 650 metres (2,130 ft), and continuing up the steep and rocky Hag's Tooth Ridge to the summit of Beenkeragh. The route gives views into the deep corrie at the base of Carrauntoohil's north-east face, known as the Eagle's Nest area. The Eagle's Nest corrie consists of three levels, with the top level (or third level), containing Lough Cummeenoughter, Ireland's highest lake. On summiting Beenkeragh, the route crosses the Beenkeragh Ridge to Carrauntoohil and descends via the Heavenly Gates path across the east-face of Carrauntoohil.

== See also ==
- Lists of mountains in Ireland
- List of mountains of the British Isles by height
- List of Furth mountains in the British Isles
