= Caher Mountain (Kerry) =

Mountain in Kerry, Ireland

Caher
- Cathair na Féinne
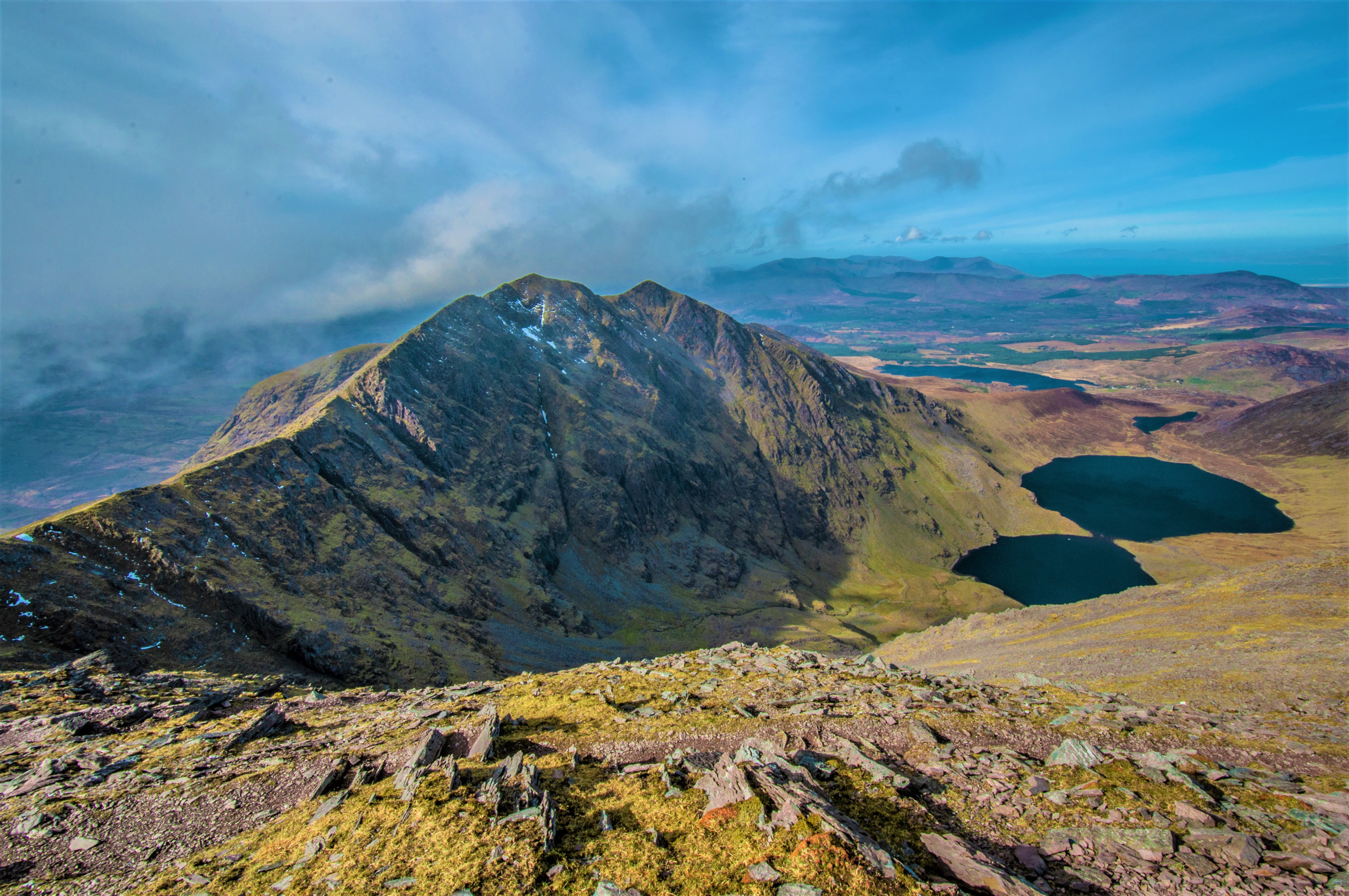
- Caher Ridge, with Caher East Top (l) and Caher West Top (r); as seen from Carrauntoohil

Highest point
- Elevation: 1,000 m (3,300 ft)
- Prominence: 99.76 m (327.3 ft)
- Isolation: 0.71 miles (1.14 km)
- Listing: Furth, Hewitt, Arderin, Simm, Vandeleur-Lynam
- Coordinates: 51.994449°N 9.758549°W

Naming
- English translation: stone fort of the Fianna
- Language of name: Irish

Geography
- Location within Ireland
- Location: County Kerry, Ireland
- Parent range: MacGillycuddy's Reeks
- OSI/OSNI grid: V792838
- Topo map: OSI Discovery 78

Geology
- Mountain type(s): Purple sandstone & siltstone, (Ballinskelligs Sandstone Formation)

Climbing
- Easiest route: via Coomloughra Horseshoe

Caher or Caher East Top (Irish: Cathair na Féinne, meaning 'stone fort of the Fianna') at 1,000 metres (3,300 ft), is the third-highest peak in Ireland, on the Irish Arderin and Vandeleur-Lynam classifications. It is part of the MacGillycuddy's Reeks in County Kerry.

== Geography ==
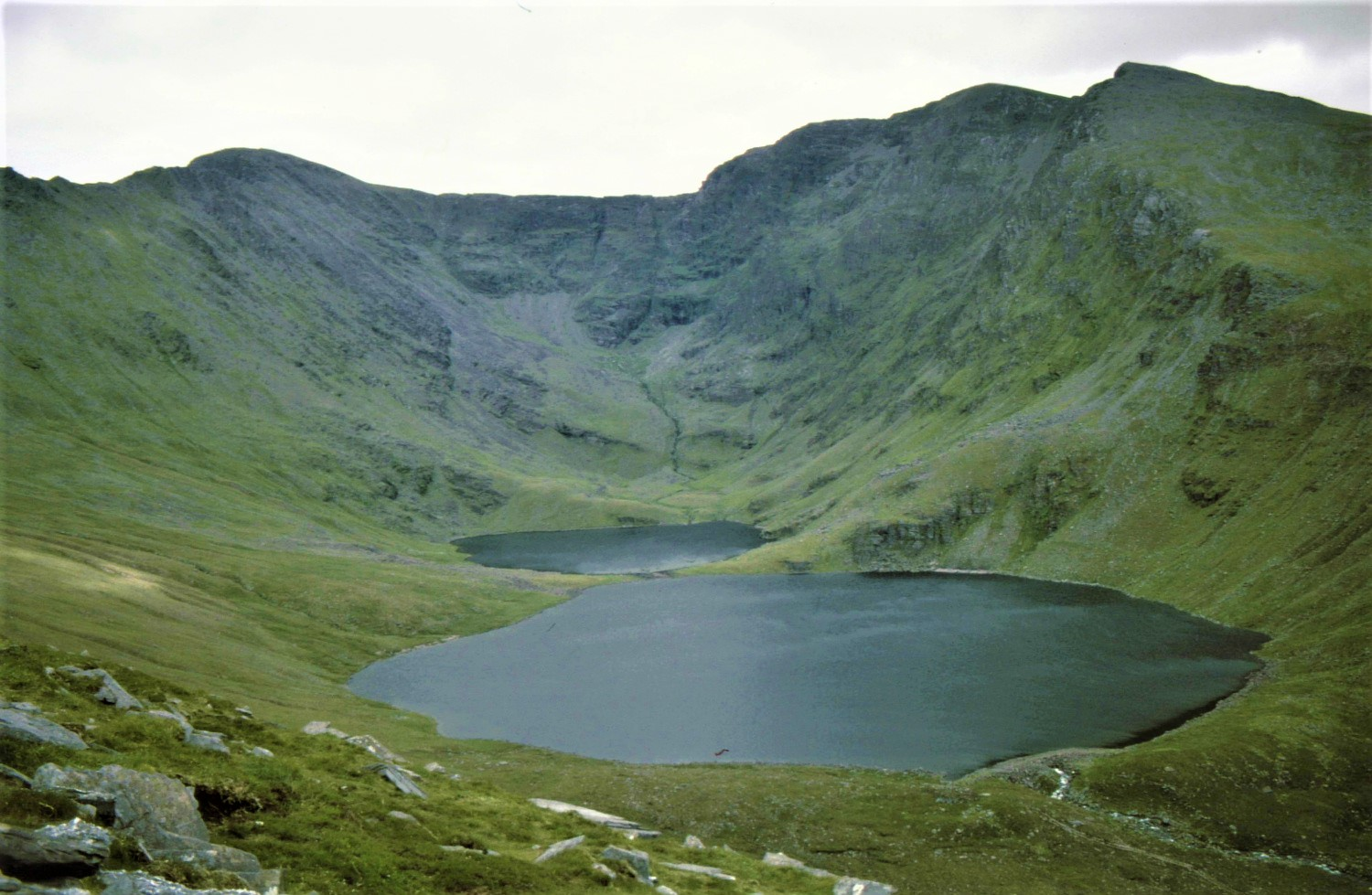
The Coomloughra Horseshoe with Caher East Top and Caher West Top on the right, Carrauntoohil back left, and the Beenkeragh Ridge on the far left.

Caher is Ireland's third-highest peak. The mountain lies to the southwest of Carrauntoohil, Ireland's highest peak at 1,038.6 metres (3,407 ft 6 in), in the MacGillycuddy's Reeks range in County Kerry.

Caher is often climbed as part of the Coomloughra Horseshoe, which takes 6–8 hours and is described as "one of Ireland’s classic ridge walks". It takes in the circuit of neighbouring peaks of Caher West Top, Carrauntoohil, The Bones, Beenkeragh, and Skregmore. On Caher's western slopes is the townland of Derrynafeana (Irish: Doire na Féinne, meaning 'oak wood of the Fianna').

Climbers refer to the narrow path that runs along the top of Caher West Top and neighboring Caher, as the Caher Ridge.

Caher is the 200th–highest mountain in Britain and Ireland on the Simm classification. Caher is regarded by the Scottish Mountaineering Club ("SMC") as one of 34 Furths, which is a mountain above 3,000 ft (914.4 m) in elevation, and meets the other SMC criteria for a Munro (e.g. "sufficient separation"), but which is outside of (or furth) Scotland; which is why Caher is sometimes referred to as one of the 13 Irish Munros. Caher's prominence qualifies it to meet the Arderin classification, and the British Isles Simm and Hewitt classifications. Caher does not appear in the MountainViews Online Database, 100 Highest Irish Mountains, as it is below the required the prominence threshold of 100 m (328 ft).

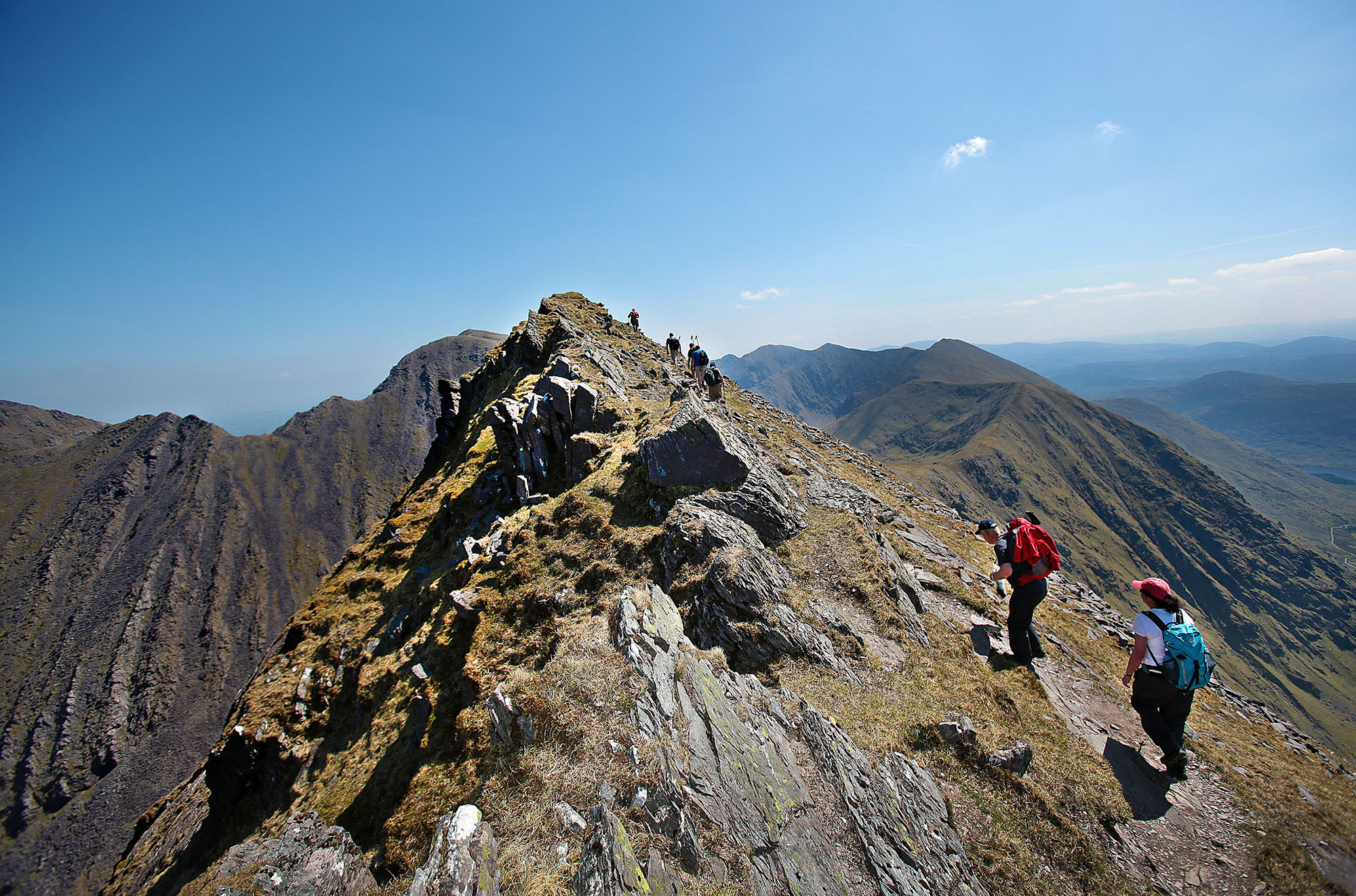
Climbers on the summit of Caher East Top with Carrauntoohil in the left background and The Bones in the far left background. To the right of Caher's summit is the long eastern section of the Reeks

== See also ==
- Lists of mountains in Ireland
- List of mountains of the British Isles by height
- List of Furth mountains in the British Isles
