= Conservation in Ireland =

Conservation in Ireland may refer to:

- Conservation in the Republic of Ireland
- List of Special Areas of Conservation in Northern Ireland
- National nature reserves in Northern Ireland
