= Hag's Tooth, Kerry =

Mountain in County Kerry, Ireland

The Hag's Tooth
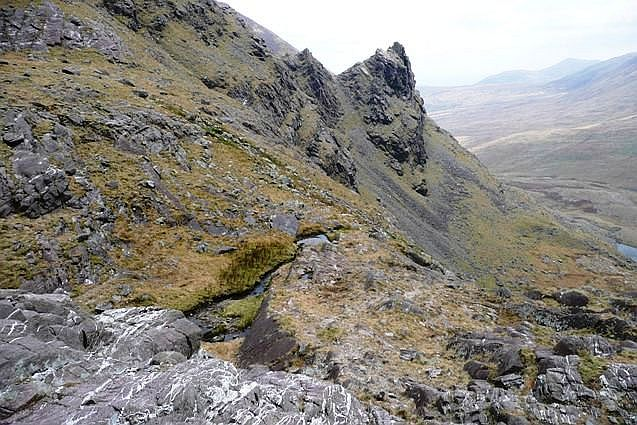
- Looking back down into the Hag's Glen having walked passed the distinctive, Hag's Tooth

Highest point
- Elevation: 650 m (2,130 ft)
- Prominence: 15 m (49 ft)
- Listing: Vandeleur-Lynam
- Coordinates: 52°00′19″N 9°44′03″W

Naming
- Native name: Stumpa an tSaimh
- English translation: Stump of the sorrel

Geography
- Location within island of Ireland
- Location: County Kerry, Ireland
- Parent range: MacGillycuddy's Reeks
- OSI/OSNI grid: V809850
- Topo map: OSI Discovery 78

Geology
- Mountain type: Well-bedded grey sandstone Bedrock

The Hag's Tooth (Irish: Stumpa an tSaimh, meaning 'stump of the sorrel'), at 650 metres (2,130 ft) high, is a sharp rock spike which is the 193rd highest peak in Ireland on the Vandeleur-Lynam scale. It is also known as Stumpeenadaff (Irish: Stuimpín an Daimh, meaning 'little pinnacle of the ox'). The Hag's Tooth is situated in the Hag's Glen beside the Eagle's Nest corrie of Carrauntoohil and is part of the MacGillycuddy's Reeks in County Kerry.

== Geography ==
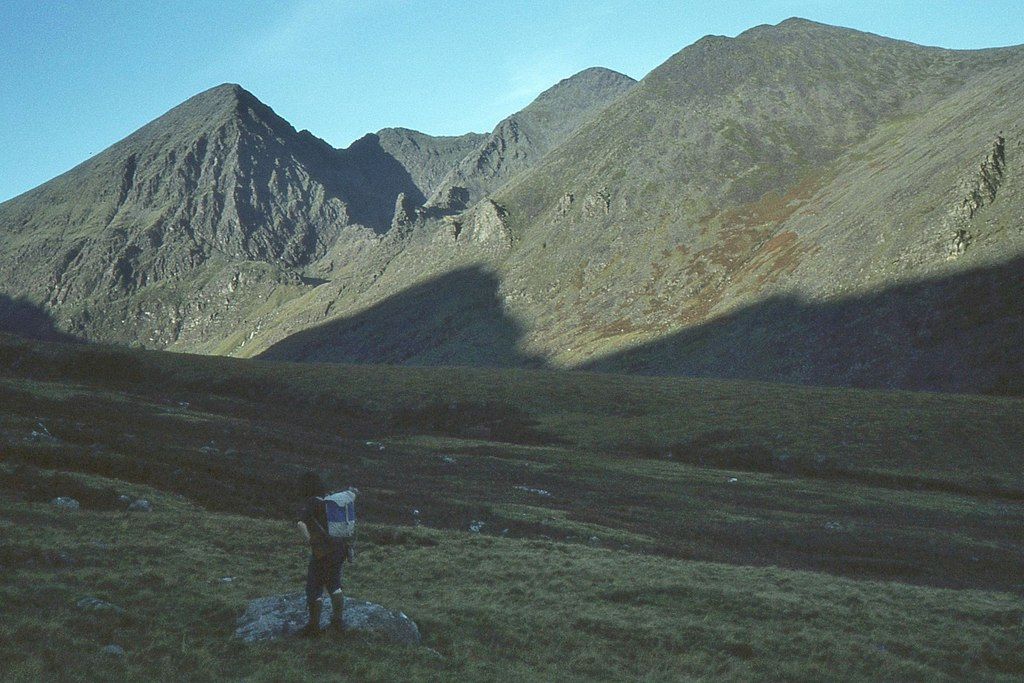
Looking at the Eagle's Nest corrie (in shade), surrounded by Carrauntoohil (l), The Bones and the Beenkeragh Ridge (centre, back), Beenkeragh (r), and the Hag's Tooth, and the Hag's Tooth Ridge up to Beenkeragh (right). Knockbrinnea is far right.

The Hag's Tooth is a distinctive triangular rock feature encountered when walking through the Hag's Glen on the way to climbing Carrauntoohil 1,038.6 metres (3,407 ft), Ireland's highest mountain, via the classic Devil's Ladder route. The Hag's Tooth rock is described as "remarkably unstable".

The steep and narrow rocky ridge from the Hag's Tooth up to the summit of Beenkeragh, is referred to as the Hag's Tooth Ridge (see photo opposite).

Because of the low prominence of the Hag's Tooth, it only qualifies as a mountain on the Vandeleur-Lynam classification—Irish peaks over 600 m (2,000 ft), and with prominence over 15 m (49 ft); a threshold that the Hag's Tooth just meets.

The Hag's Tooth does not appear in the MountainViews Online Database, 100 Highest Irish Mountains, as the prominence threshold is 100 m (328 ft).

== Climbing ==
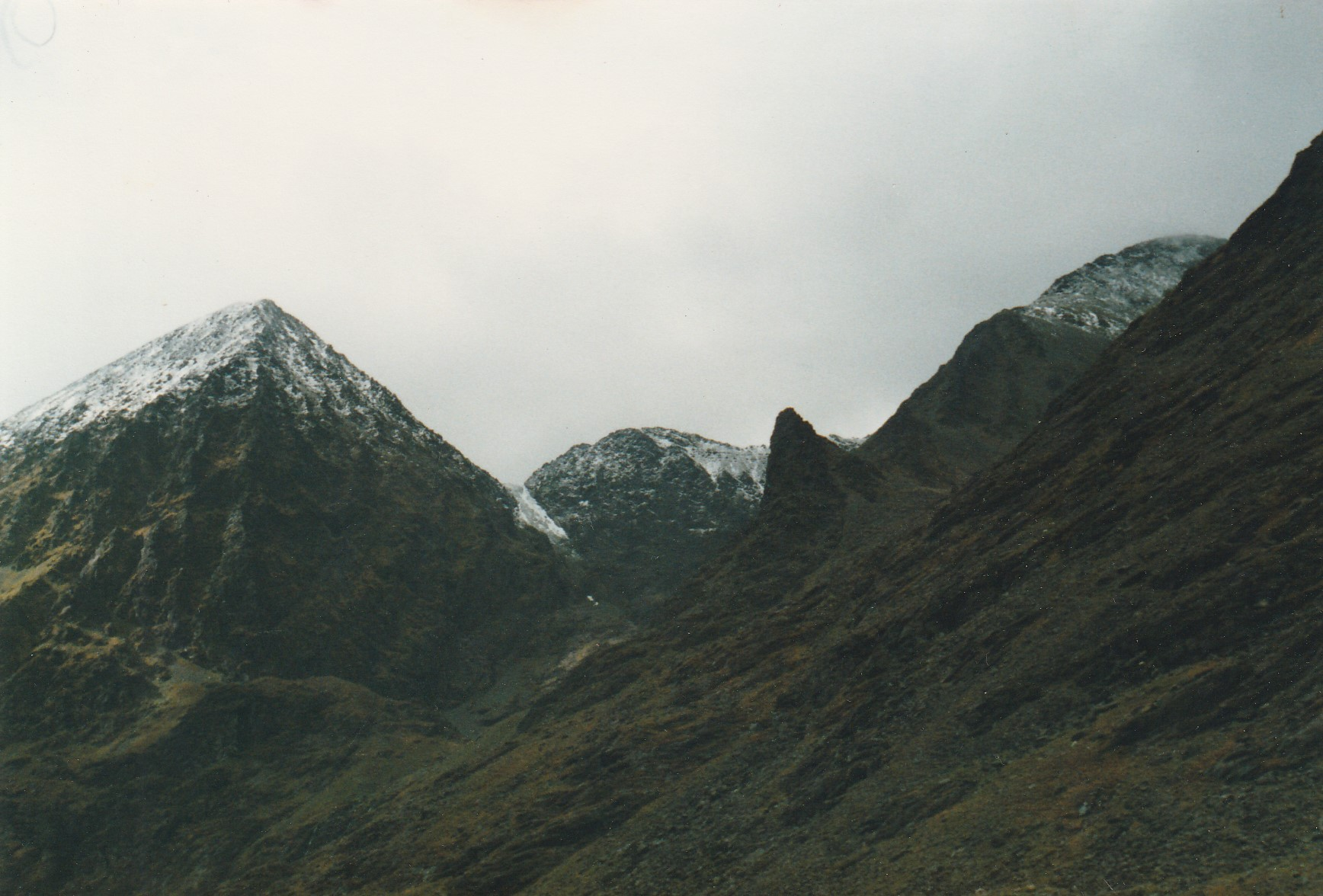
The Hag's Tooth in centre

The route to the Hag's Tooth follows the same path to access the Heavenly Gates gully of Carrauntoohil (the Heavenly Gates are sometimes used as an alternative descent route to the Devil's Ladder from the summit of Carrauntoohil), and also to access the dramatic deep corrie at the base of Carrauntoohil's north-east face, known as the Eagle's Nest area. The Eagle's Nest corrie consists of three distinct levels, with the top level containing Lough Cummeenoughter, Ireland's highest lake.

The narrow rocky ridge from the Hag's Tooth up to the summit of Beenkeragh, the Hag's Tooth Ridge, is regarded for its scrambling, and for its views into the Eagle's Nest area and the major gullies of Carrauntoohil's north-east face. The route also enables loop to be completed by continuing across the infamous Beenkeragh Ridge to Carrauntoohil, and then descending via the Heavenly Gates, back into the Hag's Glen. However, it is also a dangerous route and has been the scene of accidents.

== See also ==
- Lists of mountains in Ireland
- List of mountains of the British Isles by height
- List of Furth mountains in the British Isles
