= DIT School of Electrical & Electronic Engineering =

CEBE engineering school

Coordinates: 53.337291°N 6.267333°W

School of Electrical and Electronic Engineering Dublin Institute of Technology
- Irish: Scoil na hInnealtóireachta Leictrí agus Leictreonaí
- Parent institution: College of Engineering & Built Environment was Dublin Institute of Technology now Technological University Dublin
- Affiliations: IEI; SEFI; EUA; IAU; Cisco Systems
- Head of School: Prof. Michael Conlon (2015)
- Academic staff: 87
- Students: 1,200+
- Location: Dublin 8, Ireland
- Campus: Kevin Street
- Website: https://www.tudublin.ie/explore/faculties-and-schools/engineering-built-environment/electrical-and-electronic-engineering/

The Dublin Institute of Technology (DIT) School of Electrical and Electronic Engineering (SEEE) was the largest and one of the longest established Schools of Electrical and Electronic Engineering in Ireland. It was located at the DIT Kevin Street Campus in Dublin City, as part of the College of Engineering & Built Environment (CEBE).

In 2019, DIT along with the Institute of Technology Blanchardstown (ITB) and the Institute of Technology Tallaght (ITT) became the founding institutes of the new Technological University Dublin (TU Dublin).

== Overview ==
The DIT School of Electrical and Electronic Engineering was the largest education provider of Electrical and Electronic Engineering in Ireland in terms of programme diversity, staff and student numbers, covering a wide range of engineering disciplines including; Communications Engineering, Computer Engineering, Power Engineering, Electrical Services Engineering, Control Engineering, Energy Management and Electronic Engineering. The school included well established research centres in areas such as photonics, energy, antennas, communications and electrical power, with research outputs in; biomedical engineering, audio engineering, sustainable design, assistive technology and health informatics.

Educational courses in technical engineering commenced at Kevin St. Dublin 8 in 1887. The school sought accreditation for its programmes from the appropriate Irish and international professional body organisations, such as the Institution of Engineers of Ireland, offering education across the full range of third level National Framework of Qualifications (NFQ) Levels, from Level 6 to Level 10 (apprenticeships to post-doctoral degrees).

During the 2010s, the school delivered 23 individual programmes to over 1,200 students and had an output of approximately 350 graduates per year.

In 2015, the head of the school was Professor Michael Conlon.

In 2015, Electrical & Electronic Engineering was expected to be the first School from the College of Engineering and Built Environment to move to the new multibillion-euro DIT Grangegorman Campus in September 2018.

The Dublin Institute of Technology (DIT) no longer exists under that name, as it merged with other institutions to become Technological University Dublin (TU Dublin). Its School of Electrical and Electronic Engineering remains the oldest and largest electrical engineering school in Ireland.

== Research ==
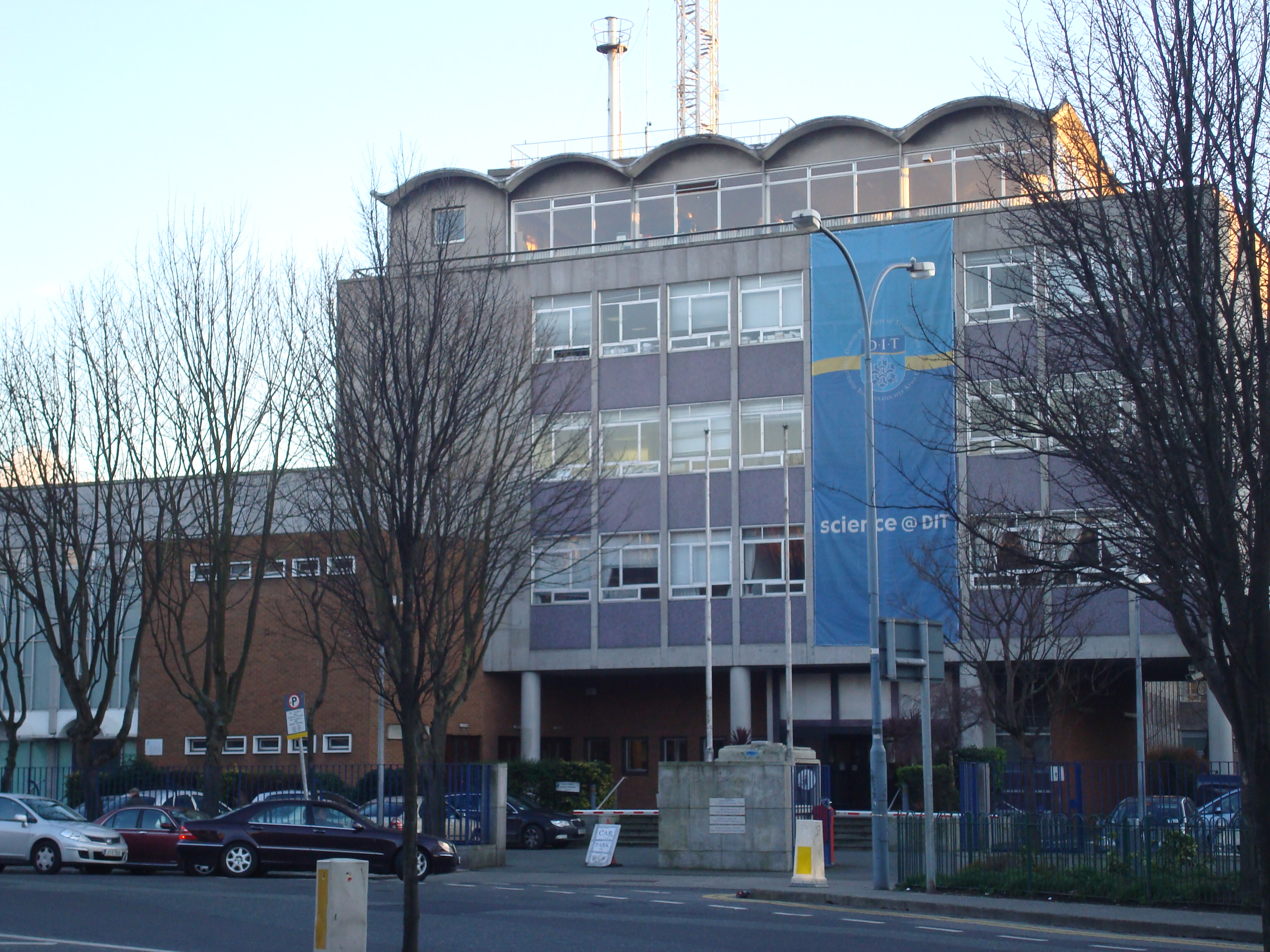
The DIT Kevin Street Campus is home to the Faculty of Engineering and Faculty of Science

The college had strong industry links, and many programmes offered placement periods in the industry, allowing students to gain valuable real-world experience. The school focused on research with a strong emphasis on producing relevant ideas to help Irish industry compete globally. Each year SEEE research produced patents and technologies to license, this included a successful spin-off company in the field of mobile communications. The school hosts four research centres;

- Antenna & High Frequency Research Centre (AHFR)
- Photonics Research Centre (PRC)
- Electrical Power Research Centre (EPRC)
- Communications Network Research Institute (CNRI)

The school also had two research groups - the tPOT Research Group and Energy Resource Group - as well as involvement with the Dublin Energy Lab.

DIT SEEE research was recognised internationally for its impact and quality. Researchers in the school built strong collaborations with worldwide renowned groups in Europe, China, India, and elsewhere, allowing the school's researchers unique access to research knowledge and facilities. DIT was an accredited Cisco Networking Academy, Instructor Training Center (ITC) and Academy Support Center (ASC).

== See also ==
- DIT School of Electronic and Communications Engineering
- Engineers Ireland
- Cisco Networking Academy
