= Corbett (surname) =

Corbett is an English-language surname.

It can be derived from the Anglo-Norman French, Middle English, and Old French corbet, which is a diminutive of corb, meaning "raven". The surname probably originated from a nickname referring to someone with dark hair or a dark complexion like a raven's. The surname was brought to England from Normandy, and spread to Scotland in the 12th century, and into northern Ireland in the 17th century. Early instances of the name are Corbet in Shropshire, recorded in Domesday Book in 1086; Corbet in Shropshire, recorded in the Assize Rolls of Worcestershire in 1158; and le Corbet in Oxfordshire, recorded in the Eynsham Cartulary in 1323. Variations of the surname include: Corbet, and Corbitt.

Corbett can also be an Anglicised form of the Irish surnames Ó Corbáin and Ó Coirbín, which mean "descendant of Corbán" and "descendant of Coirbín", respectively.

== Names borne by several Corbetts ==
- Jim Corbett (including James Corbett)
- John Corbett (disambiguation)
- Michael Corbett
- William Corbett
- Uvedale Corbett (disambiguation)

== In politics ==
- Albert H. C. Corbett (1887–1983), politician in Manitoba, Canada
- Alfred H. Corbett (1915–2000), politician in Oregon, United States
- Archibald Corbett, 1st Baron Rowallan (1856–1933), Scottish Liberal politician
- Arthur Corbett, 3rd Baron Rowallan (1919–1993), British aristocrat most notable for successfully having his second marriage annulled in 1970
- Henry W. Corbett (1827–1903), 3rd United States senator from Oregon
- Irvine Finlay Corbett (1915–1986), politician in British Columbia, Canada
- Jerry Corbett (1917–1997), Illinois state representative
- John Corbett (industrialist) (1817–1901), English industrialist, politician and philanthropist
- James Corbett (politician) (1906–2005), Australian Country Party politician
- James A. Corbett (1933–2001), American rancher, writer, and human rights activist
- Jim Corbett (politician) (1924–2007), U.S. politician
- Lawrence E. Corbett Jr. (1921–2020), American politician from New York
- Lawrence W. Corbett (1859–1897), American politician from Virginia
- Moses Corbet, major (1728–1814), lieutenant governor of Jersey from 4 Apr 1771 to 1781
- Panton Corbett (1785–1855), English politician
- Richard Corbett (born 1955), member of the European Parliament for the Labour Party for Yorkshire and the Humber
- Robert Corbett (Canadian politician) (1938–2025), politician in New Brunswick, Canada
- Robin Corbett, Baron Corbett of Castle Vale (1933–2012), Labour member of parliament for Birmingham, Erdington
- Ron Corbett (born 1960), mayor of Cedar Rapids, Iowa
- Shannon Corbett, Canadian politician
- Thomas Corbett, 2nd Baron Rowallan (1895–1977), Bronze Wolf awardee
- Tom Corbett (born 1949), 46th governor of Pennsylvania

== In sport ==
- Arch Corbett (1883–1920), Australian rules footballer
- Austin Corbett, American football player
- Claude Corbett, Australian sports journalist
- Doug Corbett (born 1952), American baseball pitcher
- Dick Corbett, English boxer
- Fred Corbett, English footballer who played in the late 19th and early 20th century
- Gene Corbett, major league first baseman from 1936 to 1938
- Harold Corbett, Australian rugby league footballer
- Harry Corbett, English professional boxer
- James J. Corbett, heavyweight boxing champion
- Joe Corbett, major league starting pitcher who played in the National League
- John Corbett (coach), American football player and college sports coach
- Leo Corbett, Australian footballer
- Marius Corbett, South African javelin thrower
- Mike Corbett (ice hockey, born 1942), professional hockey player
- Mike Corbett (ice hockey, born 1972)
- Norman Corbett, Scottish footballer
- Willie Corbett, Scottish footballer
- Young Corbett III, the world welterweight boxing champion
- Steve Corbett, American football Offensive Guard

== In literature ==
- Edward P. J. Corbett, author
- The Misses Corbett, Grace (c. 1765/1770–1843) and Walterina (died 1837), Scottish poets and authors
- Maryann Corbett, American poet, medievalist, and linguist
- Sarah Corbett, British poet born 1970, received Eric Gregory Award 1997
- Scott Corbett children's author
- Steve Corbett, author of When Helping Hurts

== In business ==
- Gerald Corbett (born 1951), head of Railtrack
- Henry L. Corbett (1881–1957), American businessman and politician, in Oregon
- Kevin Corbett (born 1955), American businessman, shipping and transportation, ED of NJTranist
- Roger Corbett (born 1942), Australian businessman, CEO of Woolworths Ltd 2001–2007

== In television, film and fiction ==
- Ben Corbett (1892–1961), American actor
- Bill Corbett, playwright, television writer, screenwriter, and performer
- Daniel Corbett, British meteorologist
- Glenn Corbett, American actor
- Gretchen Corbett, American actress most noted for the role of "Beth Davenport" on the television series The Rockford Files
- Harry Corbett (1918–1989), British puppeteer
- Harry H. Corbett (1925–1982), British actor
- Jeremy Corbett, New Zealand comedian
- John Corbett (born 1961), American actor
- Kari Corbett, Scottish actress
- Matthew Corbett (born 1948), British television personality known for The Sooty Show
- Ronnie Corbett (1930–2016), Scottish comedian and actor
- Shaun Taylor-Corbett, American actor
- Susannah Corbett, English actress
- Tom Corbett, Space Cadet, the main character in a series of Tom Corbett — Space Cadet stories
- Winslow Corbett, American actress and the daughter of Rockford Files supporting player Gretchen Corbett

== In the military ==
- Boston Corbett, the Union soldier who shot and mortally wounded Abraham Lincoln's assassin, John Wilkes Booth
- Elsie Cameron Corbett (1893 –1977), volunteer ambulance driver in World War I
- Frederick Corbett, English recipient of the Victoria Cross
- Julian Corbett, British naval historian and geostrategist of the late 19th and early 20th centuries
- Thomas Corbett, Indian Army officer

== In geography ==
- John Rooke Corbett, mountaineer and compiler of list of peaks between 2500 and 3000 feet.

== In other fields ==
- Edwin Corbett (1819–1888), British diplomat, envoy to several countries
- Greville G Corbett (born 1947), British linguist
- Jim Corbett (1875–1955), British hunter and naturalist in India
- James W. Corbett (1928–1994), American physicist
- Jonathan Corbett, British TV presenter, food commentator & buyer for Tesco
- Joseph Corbett Jr. (1928–2009), American former Fulbright scholar jailed for murder
- Irene Colvin Corbett (1881–1912), American nurse and musician who died on the Titanic
- Kizzmekia Corbett (born 1986), American immunologist
- Liz Corbett English epidemiologist
- Margaret Darst Corbett (1889–1962), American vision educator
- Ned Corbett (1887–1964), Canadian adult educator and leader in the field.
- Sidney Corbett (born 1960), American composer based in Germany
- Ted Corbett (chemist) (1923–2018), New Zealand organic chemist

== See also ==
- Corbet
- Corbet baronets
- Corbett (disambiguation)
- Corbeau (disambiguation)
