= Harry Corbett (disambiguation) =

Harry Corbett (1918–1989) was an English puppeteer, magician and presenter.

Harry Corbett may also refer to:

- Harry Corbett (boxer) (1904–1957), English boxer
- Harry H. Corbett (1925–1982), English actor
- Harry Corbett (footballer) (born 1943), Australian rules footballer

== See also ==
- Harold Corbett (1892–1917), Australian rugby player
- Henry Corbett (disambiguation)
- Corbett (surname)
