= William Corbett =

William Corbett may refer to:

- William Corbett (composer) (1680–1748), English composer and violinist
- William Henry Corbett (1847–1941), Canadian politician
- William Corbett (politician) (1902–1971), Governor of Guam
- Willie Corbett (1922–2011), Scottish footballer
- William Corbett (poet) (1942–2018), American poet and educator
- William C. Corbett (1944–2010), Clerk of the House of Commons of Canada

== See also ==
- Bill Corbett (born 1960), American actor and puppeteer
- William Corbet (disambiguation)
- William Corbitt (1854–1922), American politician from Virginia
- Willa Corbitt, American politician from Wyoming
- Will Corbett, American silent film and stage actor
- Corbett (surname)
