= COTN =

COTN may refer to:

- Call of the Night, Japanese manga series and anime adaptation
- Children of the Nations, charity
- Church of the Nazarene, religious denomination
- Creatures of the Night, 1982 album by Kiss
- Crypt of the Necrodancer

== See also ==
- Creature of the night (disambiguation)
