= Cyclic microcellular foaming =

Cyclic microcellular foaming refers to the solid-state Microcellular plastic manufacturing technique in which the polymer is foamed sequentially. The concept was first introduced in a research article in peer-reviewed international journal, Materials Letters on Acrylonitrile butadiene styrene as the base Polymer.

In the right side, the scanning electron images describes the concept of cyclic microcellular foaming. Clearly, it can be seen that with the repeated microcellular foaming, the cell size enhances significantly and simultaneously the cell wall thickness reduces.

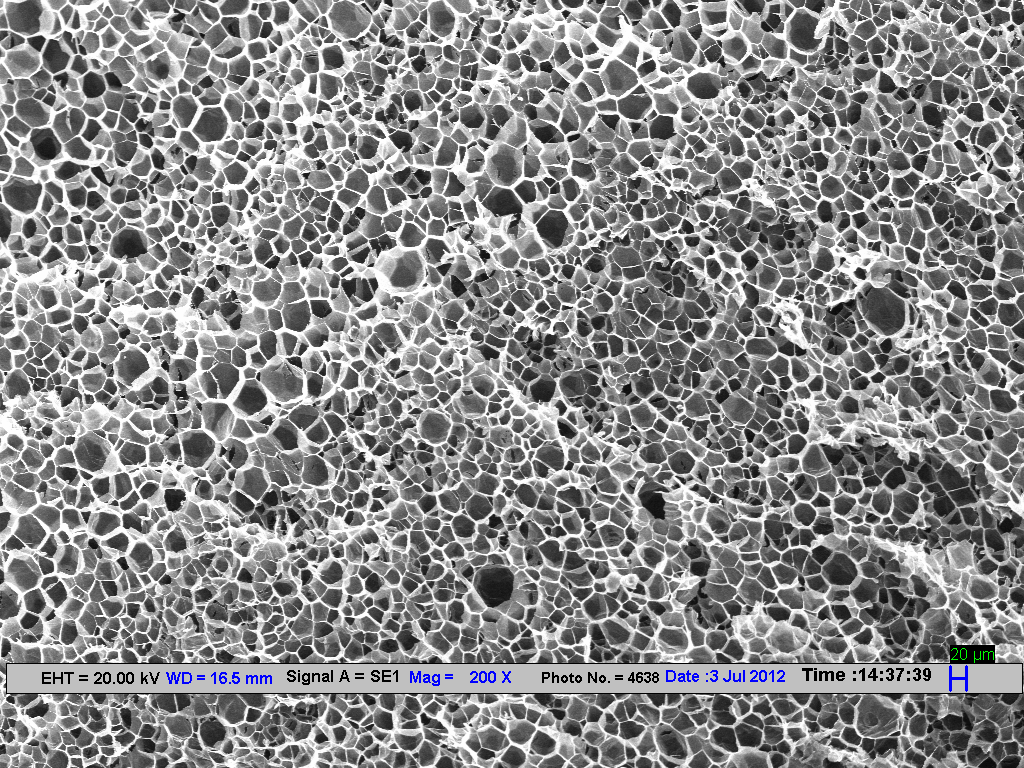
This image describes the scanning electron micrograph of a batch solid-state first stage foamed microcellular acrylonitrile butadiene styrene foam.

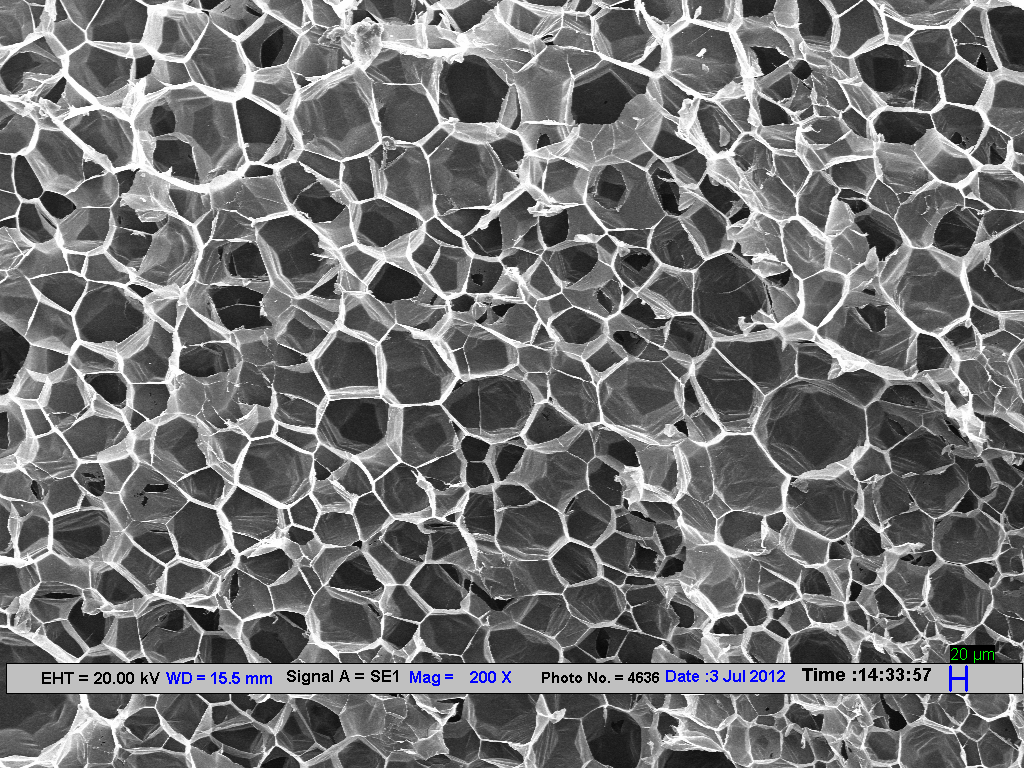
This image is a scanning electron micrograph of cyclic microcellular foamed Acylonitrile Butadiene Styrene polymer.

Further, in the research article, these cyclic microcellular foamed polymers were exposed to ultrasound excitations due to which the cell walls got ruptured and open cellular microstructure were developed. The further images describe the scanning electron micrographs of the influence of ultrasonic waves on the microcellular morphological attributes. Certainly, it can be clearly observed that the cells become interconnected and porous which opens up a wide new field of research in microcellular polymers.

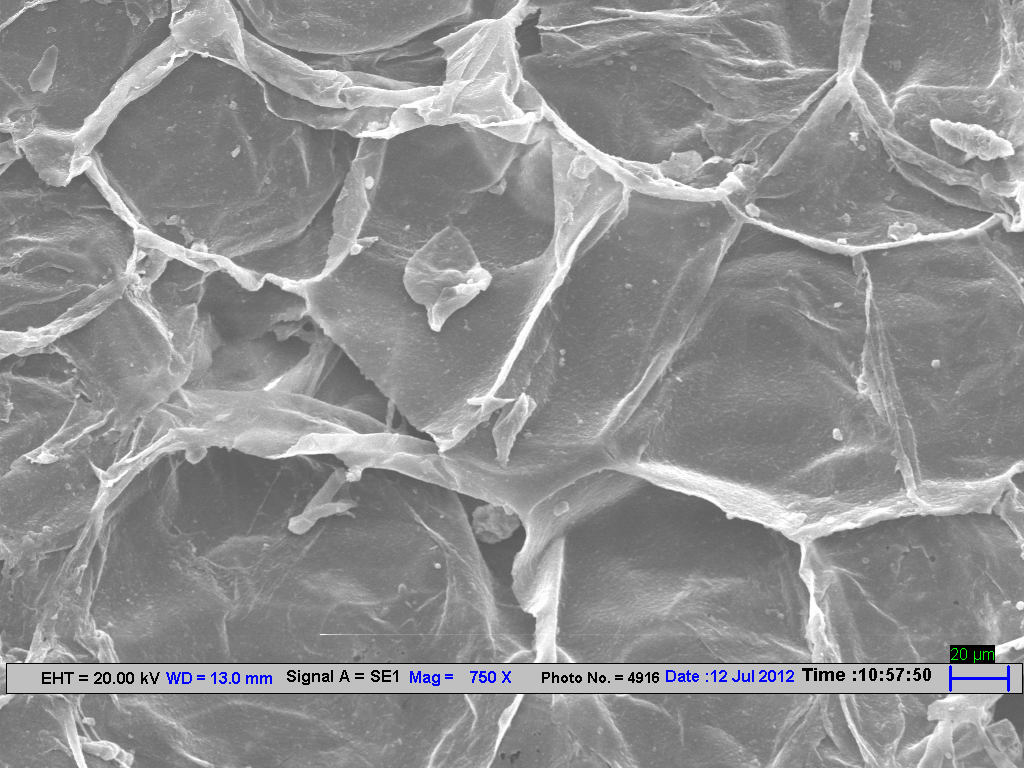
This image is a scanning electron micrograph of acrylonitrile butadiene styrene foam without ultrasound treatment.

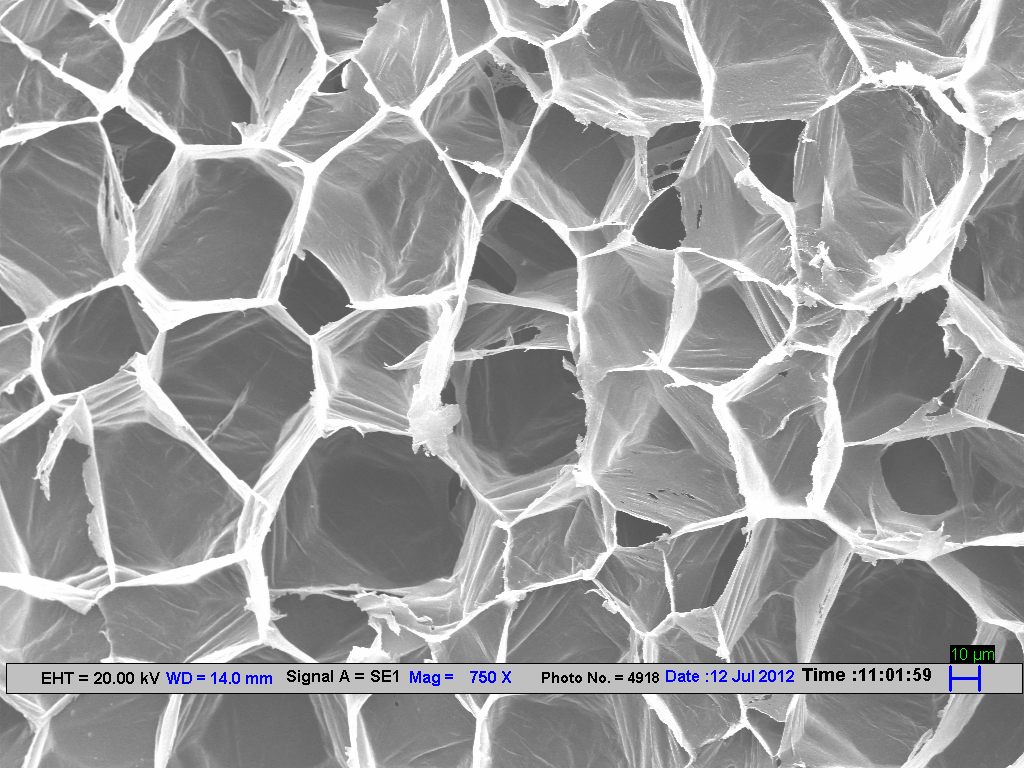
This image is a scanning electron micrograph of acrylonitrile butadiene styrene foam with ultrasound treatment.
