= They Only Come Out at Night (disambiguation) =

They Only Come Out at Night is the fourth studio album by The Edgar Winter Group.

They Only Come Out at Night may also refer to:

- They Only Come Out at Night (TV series), a 1975 TV series directed by Daryl Duke
- "They Only Come Out at Night" (Lordi song)
- "They Only Come Out at Night" (Peter Brown song)
- We Only Come Out at Night, a song by Smashing Pumpkins on the album Mellon Collie and the Infinite Sadness

== See also ==
- Creature of the night (disambiguation)
