= Corbeanu =

Corbeanu is a Romanian surname. Notable people with the surname include:

- Florin Corbeanu (born 1976), Romanian rower
- Theo Corbeanu (born 2002), Canadian soccer player

== See also ==
- Corbeau (disambiguation)
