= Whinfell Beacon =

Hill in Cumbria, England

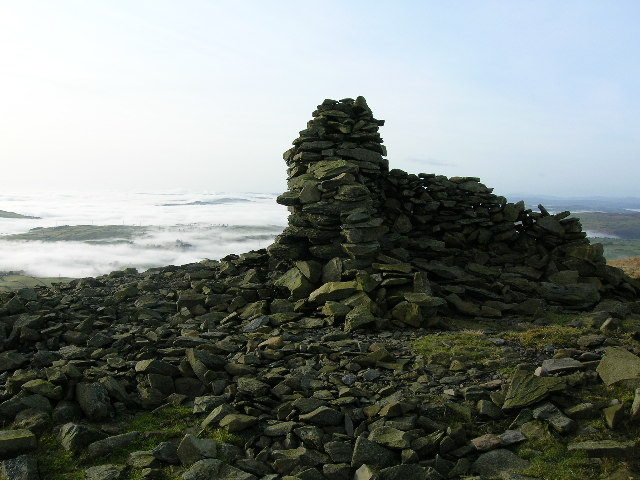
- Cairn and shelter near the summit, 2006

Highest point
- Elevation: 472 m (1,549 ft)
- Prominence: 78 m (256 ft)
- Parent peak: Grayrigg Forest
- Listing: Tump, Fellranger
- Coordinates: 54°23′47″N 2°39′30″W

Geography
- Location within the Lake District
- Location: Lake District, England
- OS grid: NY573003
- Topo map: OS Landranger 91

Whinfell Beacon is a hill of 472 metres (1,549 ft) in Westmorland and Furness, Cumbria, England, to the east of the Lake District. It is in the far east of the Lake District National Park since the national park's expansion in 2019. It is east of the A6 road and west of the M6 motorway, south of Borrowdale, Westmorland (not the better known Borrowdale in the central lake district) and east of the upper reaches of the River Mint.

There is a cairn and remains of a shelter near the summit, but the highest point is a few metres away on the north east side of the wall across the summit.

Whinfell Beacon can form part of a 19 kilometres (12 mi) walk starting from the A685 road 3.5 miles (5.6 km) south of Tebay, climbing Grayrigg Forest (with an optional extension to Grayrigg Pike), and following the ridge south of Borrowdale over Birk Fell, Castle Fell and Mabbin Crag, west as far as the A6 until dropping into the valley for the return.

It is one of three summits, along with Grayrigg Forest and Winterscleugh, added to the list of Fellrangers in the new edition (2019-2021) of Mark Richards' eight volumes of guidebooks and bringing the total to 230. They were included after the boundary of the Lake District National Park was extended in 2019, adding them to the national park.
