= Henry Corbett (disambiguation) =

Henry W. Corbett was an American businessman and politician.

Henry Corbett may also refer to:

- Henry L. Corbett, American businessman and politician (and a grandson of Henry W. Corbett)
- Sir Henry Corbet, 6th Baronet (died 1750), of the Corbet baronets

== See also ==
- Harry Corbett (disambiguation)
- Corbett (surname)
