= Winterscleugh =

Hill in Cumbria, England

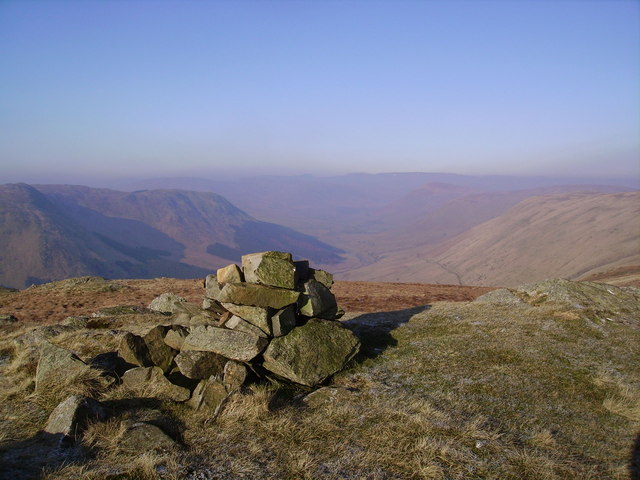
- Summit cairn, looking north west up Borrowdale

Highest point
- Elevation: 464.3 m (1,523 ft)
- Prominence: 272 m (892 ft)
- Parent peak: Tarn Crag
- Listing: Fellranger
- Coordinates: 54°25′10″N 2°39′14″W

Geography
- Location within the Lake District
- Location: Lake District, England
- OS grid: NY577028
- Topo map: OS Landranger 91

Winterscleugh is a hill of 464 metres (1,522 ft) in Cumbria, England, to the east of the Lake District. It is in the far east of the Lake District National Park since the national park's expansion in 2019. It is east of the A6 road and west of the M6 motorway, on the northern side of Borrowdale, Westmorland (not to be confused with the better known Borrowdale in the central Lake District).

== Overview ==
The name Winterscleugh is said to mean "the ravine associated with the family of Edward Winter, recorded from C17th as land-holders in Borrowdale".

Winterscleugh can be included in a 20 kilometres (12 mi) "Whinash Ridge" walk, starting from the summit of the A6 road 6 miles (9.7 km) south of Shap, passing over Crookdale Crag and Whinash, and returning along the Borrowdale valley bottom.

It is one of three summits, along with Grayrigg Forest and Whinfell Beacon, added to the list of Fellrangers in the new edition (2019-2021) of Mark Richards' eight volumes of guidebooks and bringing the total to 230. They were added after the Lake District National Park boundary was extended in 2019, including them for the first time.
