= Grenander =

- Alfred Frederik Elias Grenander (1863–1931) architect, and an older brother of Henning Grenander (1874–1958)
- Henning Grenander (1874–1958) Swedish figure skater, a younger brother of Alfred Fredrik Elias Grenander (1863–1931)
- Mary Elizabeth Grenander (1918–1998) professor of English and philanthropist
- Ulf Grenander (1923–2016) statistician and a professor of applied mathematics
