= James Corbett =

James or Jim Corbett may refer to:

== Sports ==
- James J. Corbett (1866–1933), a.k.a. "Gentleman Jim", American professional boxer, world heavyweight champion.
- Jim Corbett (athletic director) (1919–1967), American athletics director at LSU, first president of the NACDA, namesake of Corbett Award
- James Corbett (American football) (born 1955), American football player
- Jimmy Corbett (born 1980), English footballer
- James Corbett (author) (born 1978), English author, wrote histories of English football

== Other ==
- Jim Corbett (Edward James Corbett, 1875–1955), British hunter, conservationist, and author, Man-Eaters of Kumaon
- Jim Corbett National Park, a wildlife reserve in India named after the British hunter
- James A. Corbett (1933–2001), American rancher, writer, and human rights activist
- James Corbett (politician) (1908–2005), Australian Country Party politician
- Jim Corbett (politician) (1924–2007), U.S. politician
- James W. Corbett (1928–1994), American physicist
- James Francis Corbett (1834–1912), Australian Roman Catholic bishop of Sale, Victoria

== See also ==
- James Corbitt (1913–1950), known as 'Tish', friend of and eventually executed by Albert Pierrepoint
