= John Corbet =

John Corbet may refer to:

- John Corbet, 3rd Baron Corbet (died 1347), last member of the Barons Corbet on the list of peers 1340–1349
- John Corbet (by 1500–55 or later), MP for Shropshire
- John Corbet (died 1559), MP for Norwich
- John Corbet, various Corbet baronets, including:
  - Sir John Corbet, 1st Baronet, of Sprowston (1591–1628), MP for Norfolk and Yarmouth
  - Sir John Corbet, 1st Baronet, of Stoke upon Tern (1594–1662), MP for Shropshire
- John Corbet (theologian) (1603–1641), Scottish minister of Bonhill and anti-presbyterian author
- John Corbet (Puritan) (1620–1680), Puritan author, see Richard Perrinchief
- John Corbet (MP for Bishop's Castle) (fl. 1640s), MP for Bishop's Castle (UK Parliament constituency)
- John Corbet of Sundorne (1751–1817), MP for Shrewsbury

== See also ==
- John Corbett (disambiguation)
