= John Corbett (disambiguation) =

John Corbett (born 1961) is an American actor and country music singer.

John Corbett may also refer to:

- John Corbett (album), singer John Corbett's self-titled debut album
- John Corbett (chemist) (1926–2013), American scientist
- John Corbett (coach) (1869–1947), American football player and coach
- John Corbett (cricketer) (1883–1944), English cricketer
- John Corbett (industrialist) (1817–1901), English industrialist and founder of the Chateau Impney
- John Corbett (politician) (born 1962), American politician
- John Corbett (Royal Navy officer) (1822–1893), British admiral
- John Corbett (rugby union) (1877–1945), New Zealand rugby union player
- John Corbett (writer) (born 1963), American writer and producer
- John Corbett, 4th Baron Rowallan (born 1947), British peer
- John Rooke Corbett (1876–1949), founder-member of The Rucksack Club and their Convener of Rambles

== See also ==
- Jonathan Corbett (21st century), British food television presenter
- James John Corbett (1866–1933), American boxer
- John Corbet (disambiguation)
