= Lists of mountains and hills in the British Isles =

Highest mountains in the British Isles

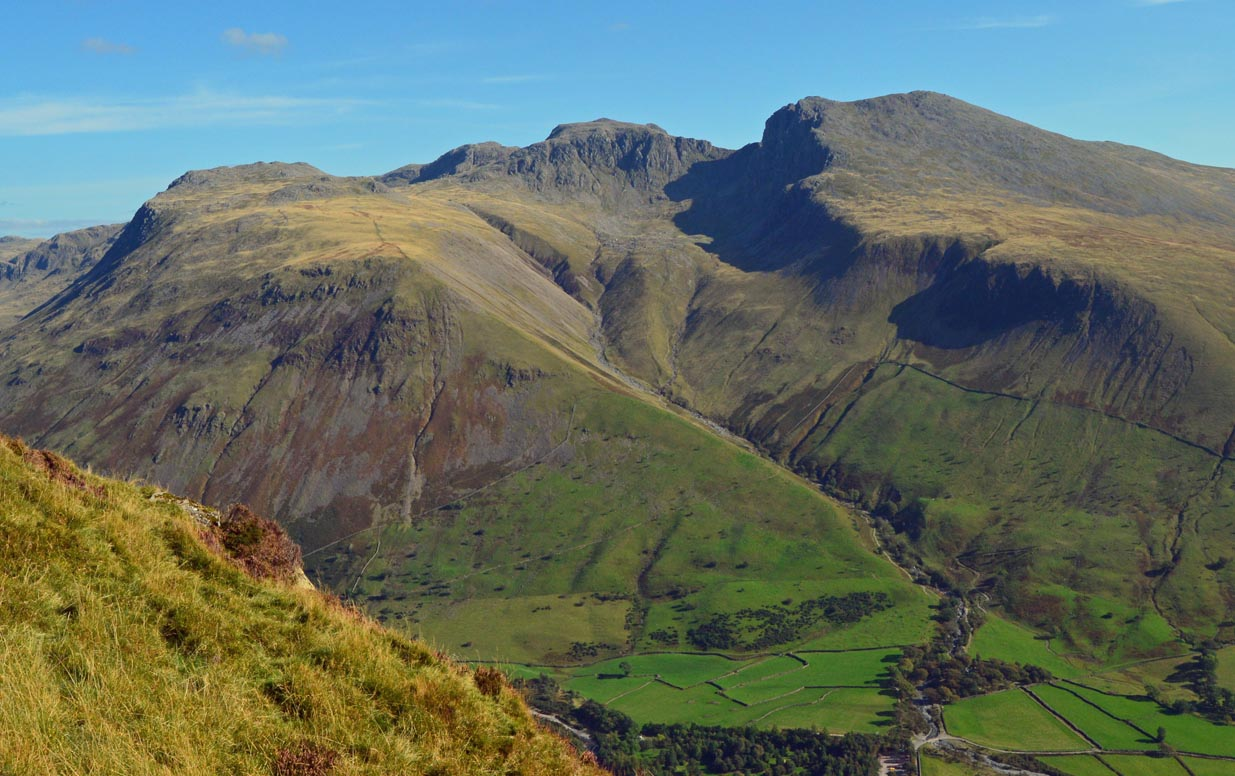
Scafell Pike in the Lake District in Cumbria. Scafell Pike is the highest mountain in England, the 257th-highest mountain in the British Isles on the Simms classification, the 138th-highest mountain on the Marilyn classification, and the 46th-highest mountain on the P600 classification. Scafell Pike has the 13th-greatest "relative height" (or prominence) in the British Isles. It is also classed as a HuMP, a Furth, a Hewitt, a Nuttall, a Wainwright, a Birkett, and a County Top.

The mountains and hills of the British Isles are categorised into various lists based on different combinations of elevation, prominence, and other criteria such as isolation. These lists are used for peak bagging, whereby hillwalkers attempt to reach all the summits on a given list, the oldest being the 282 Munros in Scotland, created in 1891.

A height above 2,000 ft, or more latterly 610 m, is considered necessary to be classified as a mountain – as opposed to a hill – in the British Isles. With the exception of Munros, all the lists require a prominence above 15 metres (49.21 ft). A prominence of between 15 and 30 metres (49.21 and 98.43 ft) (e.g. some Nuttalls and Vandeleur-Lynams), does not meet the International Climbing and Mountaineering Federation (UIAA) definition of an "independent peak", which is a threshold over 30 metres (98 ft). Most lists consider a prominence between 30 and 150 metres (98.43 and 492.1 ft) as a "top" (e.g. many Hewitts and Simms). Marilyns, meanwhile, have a prominence above 150 metres (492.1 ft), with no additional height threshold. They range from small 150-metre (490 ft) hills to the largest mountains. Prominences above 600 metres (1,969 ft), meet the P600 (the "Majors") classification, which is the UIAA international classification of a "major" mountain.

== General concepts ==
=== Elevation ===
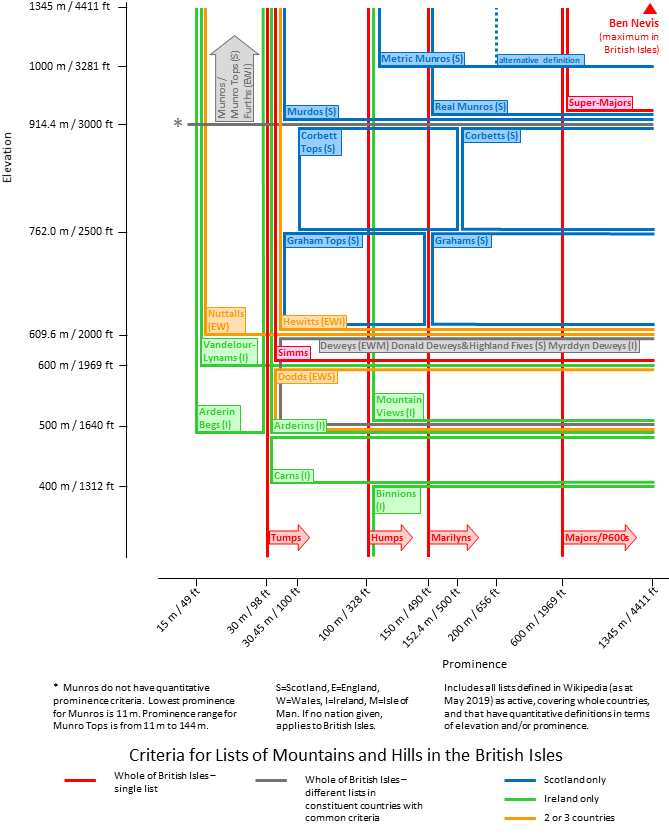
Elevation and prominence criteria used in the classification of mountains and hills in the British Isles.

There is no worldwide consensus on the definition of mountain versus a hill, but in Great Britain and Ireland it is usually taken to be any summit with an elevation of at least 2,000 feet (or 610 metres). The UK government legally defines mountain land as that over 600 metres (1,969 ft) for the purposes of freedom of access. When Calf Top in Cumbria was re-surveyed in 2016 and confirmed to be 6 millimetres above the 609.6 m threshold for a 2,000 ft peak, the Ordnance Survey described Calf Top as England's "last mountain".

Regardless of the technical definition of a mountain, cultural norms also feature, with mountains in Scotland being frequently referred to as hills irrespective of their height; examples being the Cuillin Hills and the Torridon Hills.

=== Prominence ===
All British Isles-wide mountain classifications, and most country-specific classifications, include an explicit minimum topographical prominence threshold (also called relative height, or drop, or re-ascent, between neighbouring peaks), which is typically 30–600 m (98–1,969 ft).

The lowest prominence threshold is 15 metres (49.21 ft) (e.g. Nuttalls, and Vandeleur-Lynams), but most classifications have a prominence threshold above 30 metres (98.43 ft). Many classifications use the term "Tops" for peaks with prominence between 30–150 metres (98.43–492.1 ft) (e.g. Donald Tops), while other classifications ignore height and just focus purely on prominence (e.g. P600s, Marilyns, and HuMPs).

Prominence requirements feature in International Climbing and Mountaineering Federation (UIAA) classifications of Himalayan mountains. In 1994, the UIAA stated that for a "peak" to be independent (and not a sub-peak), it needed a prominence over 30 metres (98 ft), and a "mountain" had to have a prominence above 300 metres (980 ft).

Unlike the single measurement of elevation, prominence requires the measurement of all contours around the peak and is therefore subject to greater revision over time, and thus classification lists based on prominence are subject to change. Some definitions use an imperial measurement for height, but a metric measurement for the topological prominence (e.g. Murdos, Hewitts, and Nuttalls.

=== Isolation ===
No British Isles classification uses a quantitative metric of topographic isolation (such as the distance to the next point of equal height). However, the concept is embedded in the qualitative definition of a Scottish Munro, and the Scottish Mountaineering Club requirement of "sufficient separation".

=== Database of British and Irish Hills ===
The Database of British and Irish Hills (DoBIH) was created in 2001 "with the intention of providing a comprehensive, up-to-date resource for British hillwalkers". It is maintained by a team of eight editors, and is described by the Long Distance Walkers Association as "now the most reliable online source for all Registers" (i.e. all lists of summits attained). The DoBIH has been used as a source by books, hillwalking websites and smartphone apps. It has also been used in academic and topographical research.

The DoBIH is available as a downloadable database, or in an online version under the title Hill Bagging. (Note: The DoBIH is licensed under a "Creative Commons Attribution 4.0 Unported License".) As of July 2023 the database included 20,742 hills, including all Marilyns, HuMPs, TuMPs, Simms, Dodds, Munros and Tops, Corbetts and Tops, Grahams and Tops, Donalds and Tops, Furths, Hewitts, Nuttalls, Buxton & Lewis, Bridges, Yeamans, Clems, Murdos, Deweys, Donald Deweys, Highland Fives, Wainwrights, Birketts, Synges, Fellrangers, Ethels, County tops, SIBs (Significant Islands of Britain), Dillons, Arderins, Vandeleur-Lynams, Carns and Binnions.

Since 2012, the DoBIH has had a data-sharing agreement with the Irish online database of mountains and hills known as MountainViews.

== British Isles ==
=== P600 (the "Majors") ===
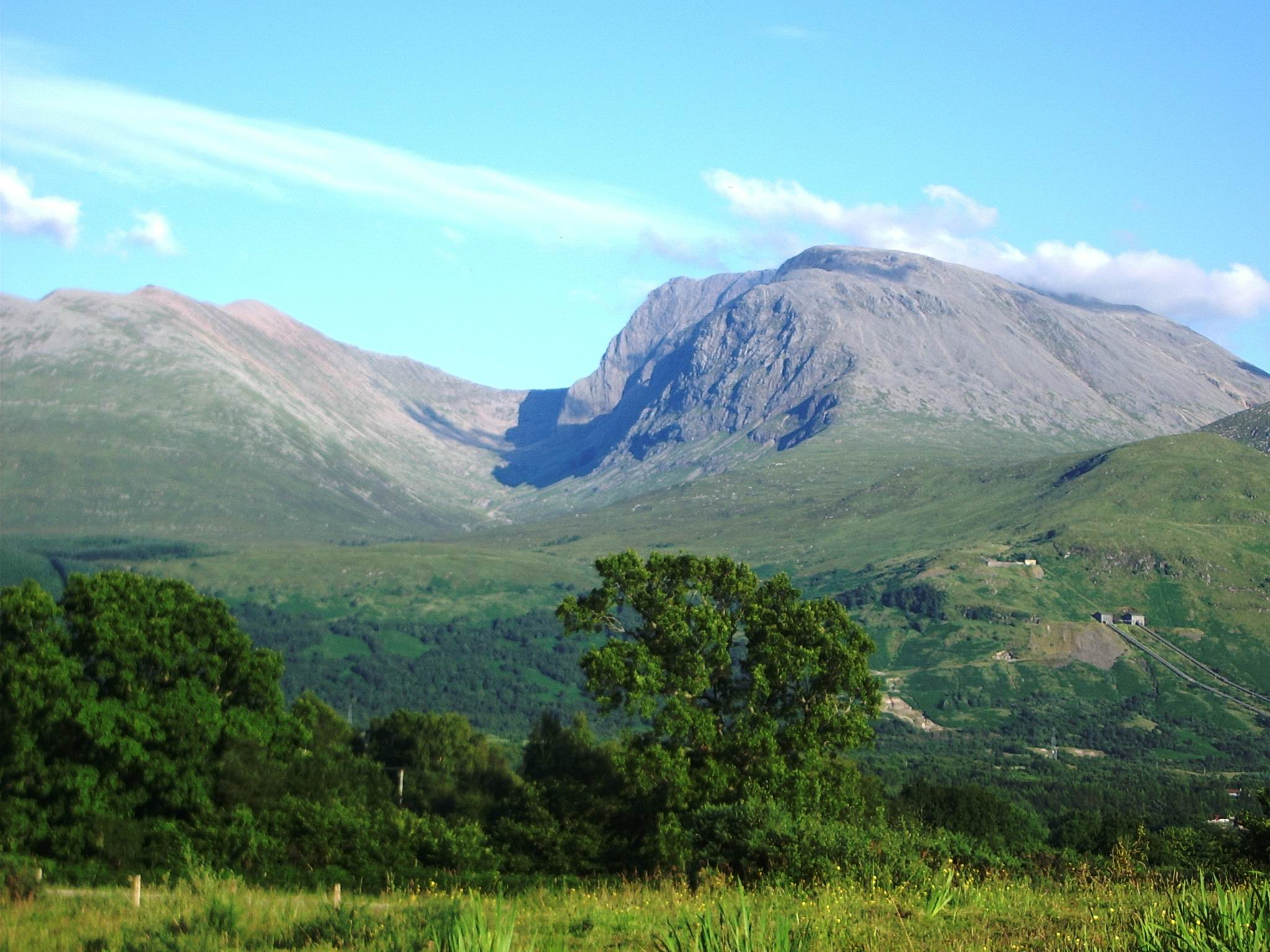
Ben Nevis is the highest mountain in the British Isles; it also has the greatest topographic prominence.

The P600s are mountains in the British Isles that have a topographical prominence of at least 600 metres (1,969 feet), regardless of absolute height or other merits. The list initially used a 2,000 ft metric (or 609.6 m, the P610s) but this was subsequently reduced to 600 m and the list became known as the "Majors". The list is authored by Mark Trengove. The definitive version is published on his Europeak website and in the Database of British and Irish Hills. It is one of the shortest of the classification lists of mountains in the British Isles as it has testing threshold criteria.

In 2006, 93 P600s were identified in Great Britain: 82 in Scotland, four in England and seven in Wales. These, together with one in Northern Ireland, one on the Isle of Man, and 24 in the Republic of Ireland, brought the total number of P600 mountains in the British Isles to 119. Later, the Welsh peak Moel Siabod's prominence was remapped at 600 metres (2,000 ft) and the list of P600s expanded to 120. In 2018 a GNSS survey gave a prominence of 599.9m. Although the margin of error means the result is not conclusive, it was accepted by Mark Trengove, who was present on the survey, bringing the total back to 119. More recently available LIDAR data for the col would give a prominence of 599.7m. In February 2020 a GNSS survey of Beinn Odhar Bheag in conjunction with OS trig point data for Rois-Bheinn found the former to be 1 metre higher. Accordingly, Beinn Odhar Bheag has replaced Rois-bheinn in the P600 list.

The British Isles' P600s contain 54 of the 282 Scottish Munros, and 10 of the 34 Non-Scottish Munros called § Furths; these 64 British Isles' mountains meet the designation of being above 3,000 feet (914 metres) in height, and 600 metres (1,969 feet) in prominence.

P600 is an international mountain classification criterion, along with P1500 (or Ultras), for a prominence above 1,500 metres (4,921 feet). The online version of The Database of British and Irish Hills also offers a P500 mountain classification: summits with a prominence above 500 metres (1,640 feet).

=== Marilyns ===
Examples of Marilyns

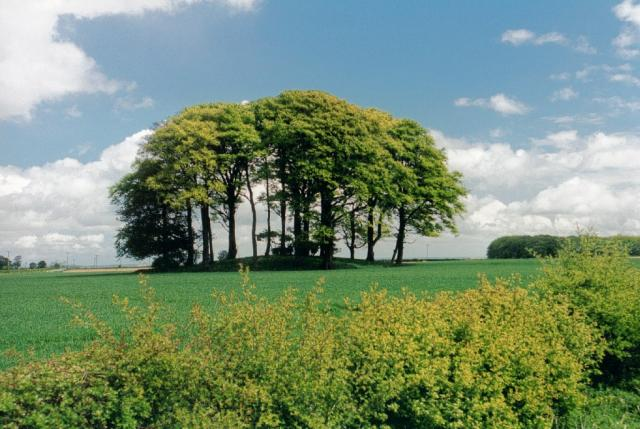
Bishop Wilton Wold (height, 248 m)

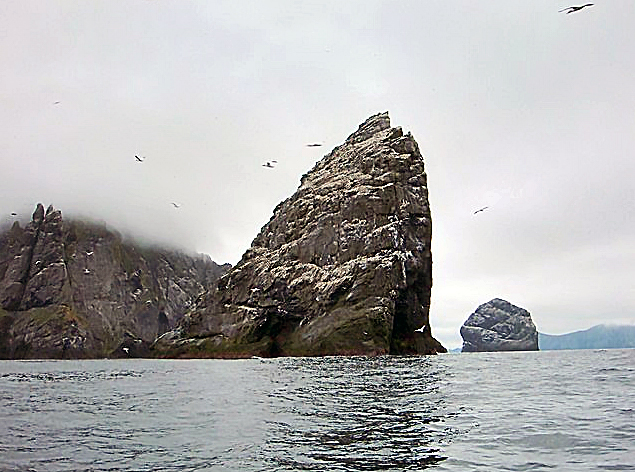
Stac an Armin (height, 196 m)

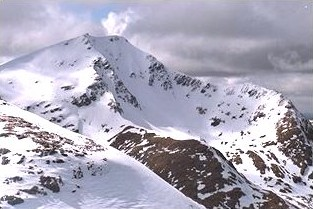
Ben Lui (height, 1,135 m)

The Marilyns are mountains and hills in the British Isles that have a topographical prominence above 150 metres (490 feet), regardless of absolute height or other merits. As of June 2025, there were 1,550 Marilyns in Great Britain: 1,218 in Scotland, 173 in England, and 159 in Wales (Black Mountain, on the England–Wales border, is counted as being in Wales). As all the marginal qualifiers have been surveyed, the current list, republished in June 2025, is likely to be stable. There are 454 Marilyns in Ireland (389 in the Republic of Ireland and 66 in Northern Ireland), and five on the Isle of Man, bringing the total for the British Isles to 2,009.

The list was first compiled in 1992 by Alan Dawson. The name was coined as a humorous contrast to the designation Munro, which is homophonous with [Marilyn] Monroe. The Marilyns are one of the most popular lists for peak baggers, and because of the lack of any height threshold, the classification includes a wide range of hills and mountains, and some sea stacks (pictured right).

=== HuMPs ===
The Marilyns were expanded in 2007 by the HuMPs (Hundred and upwards Metre Prominence), which reduced the prominence requirement to 100 m (330 ft); all British Isles Marilyns are British Isles HuMPS (but not vice versa). Though he did not use the term HuMP, Eric Yeaman's Handbook of the Scottish Hills (1989) is considered an early source as it included lists of hills with a prominence above 100 m. The name and first formal British Isles list was compiled by Mark Jackson from a number of sources and published online in 2010 in More Relative Hills of Britain. As of April 2020, there were 2,984 HuMPs in the British Isles: 2,167 in Scotland, 833 in Ireland, 441 in England, 368 in Wales and 11 in the Channel Islands. Jackson maintains a "Hall of Fame" for climbers who have summited 1,200 HuMPs.

=== Simms ===
A Simm is a mountain in the British Isles that is over 600 m (1,969 ft) high and has a prominence of at least 30 m (98 ft). The word comes from Six-hundred Metre Mountain. As of April 2020, there are 2,755 recorded Simms in the British Isles, including 2,190 Scottish Simms, 192 English Simms, 149 Welsh Simms, one Isle of Man Simm, and 223 Irish Simms. (Note: As of March 2019, the Irish MountainViews Online Database lists the prominence of Knockbrinnea (W) as 29 m, and Carrignabinnia as 27 m, and thus they do not qualify as Arderins. Due to the use of different sources, the DoBIH gives their prominence as 30 m and they are thus classed as Irish Hewitts and Simms, giving 209 Irish Hewitts and 224 Irish Simms on the DoBIH tables.) By definition all Simms are also TuMPs (see below) and most, if not all, are mountains, depending on whether 600 metres or 2,000 feet (610 m) (e.g. a § Hewitts), is used as the criterion. The idea of the Simm was introduced by Alan Dawson in June 2010, who noted that a Simm was the "broadest credible definition of what could be objectively conceived as a mountain in Britain". As of October 2018, 6,414 people had registered themselves as having climbed all 282 Scottish Munros, by March 2020 11 people had registered climbing all 1,557 Marilyns of Great Britain, while by August 2021 only four people had registered completion of the 2,531 Simms of Great Britain, three of whom have also declared completion of all 2,755 Simms of the British Isles. July 2020 saw one summit promoted and one deleted, and by 24/07/2020 all of the three initial completers had "topped up".

=== Dodds ===
The Dodds comprises hills between 500 and 600 metres in height, with a prominence above 30 metres (98 feet). The list was conceived in December 2014 in an article in Marhofn magazine as a unification of those parts of the Deweys, Donald Deweys and Highland Fives below 600m to create a metric list that can be viewed as a downwards extension of the Simms (British hills over 600m high). The acronym comes from "Donald Deweys, Deweys and Scotland". A Subdodd is a hill which just fails (by up to 10m) to qualify on the drop rule, i.e. between 500 m and 600 m with 20–29 m drop.

The list was first published by the Database of British and Irish Hills, who maintain the list, in December 2017 after it had been recognised by the Relative Hills Society. The geographical coverage was originally confined to Britain, but was extended to the Isle of Man in February 2020 and to Ireland in September 2020.

=== TuMPs ===
In 2010, Mark Jackson further expanded the HuMPS and compiled the TuMPs (Thirty and upwards Metre Prominence), a list of all hills in Britain having a prominence above 30 m (98 ft). By definition, all Murdos, Corbett Tops, Graham Tops, Hewitts and Deweys are also TuMPs. As of January 2026, there are 17,044 TuMPs; approximately half of that number that did not appear in previously researched lists were researched by Mark Jackson between 2006 and 2009. Since 2012 the list has been published and maintained by the editors of The Database of British and Irish Hills.

== Scotland only ==
=== Munros ===
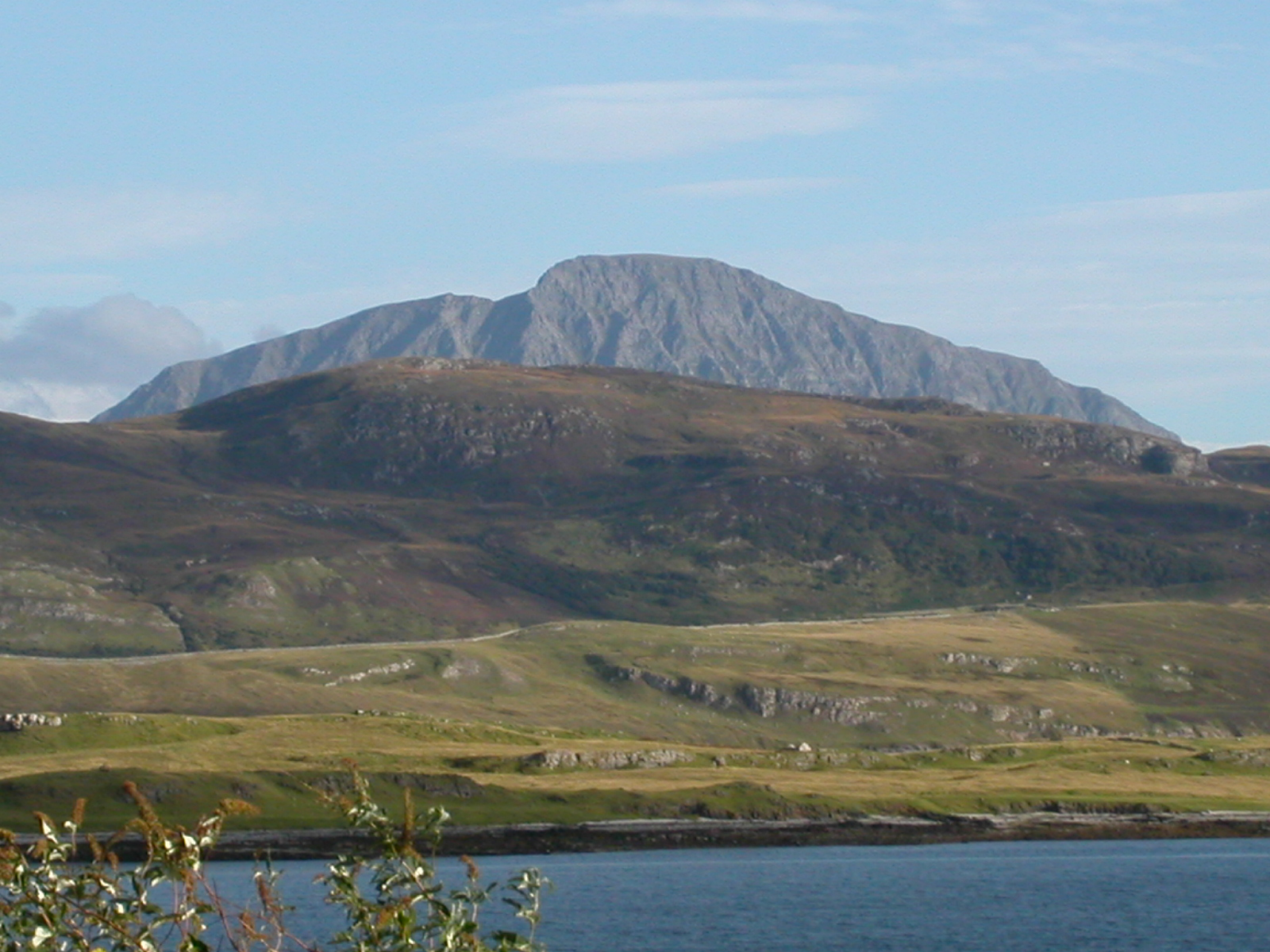
Ben Hope, in the Flow Country, is the most northerly Munro in the British Isles

The Munros are mountains in Scotland with elevation of over 3,000 feet (914.4 m). The list was originally compiled by Sir Hugh Munro in 1891, and is modified from time to time by the Scottish Mountaineering Club (SMC), an example being the delisting in December 2020 of Stob Coire na Cloiche as a Munro Top, now recognised as being of only 912.5 metres (2,994 ft). Unlike most other lists, the Munros do not depend on a rigid prominence criterion for entry; instead, those that satisfy the subjective measure of being a "separate mountain" are regarded as Munros, while subsidiary summits are given the status of Munro Tops. There are 282 Munros, and 226 further Munro Tops, totalling 508 summits, all of them in the Scottish Highlands.

A total of 202 Munros have a topographic prominence of over 150 m (492 ft), thus also being classified as Marilyns: these hills have been termed "Real Munros" in some sources. Similarly, the term "Metric Munro" has been applied to Scottish mountains over 1000 m: there are 130 such peaks with a prominence of over 100 m (328 ft), and 88 with a prominence of over 200 metres (660 ft). Neither of these terms are in widespread use.

=== Murdos ===
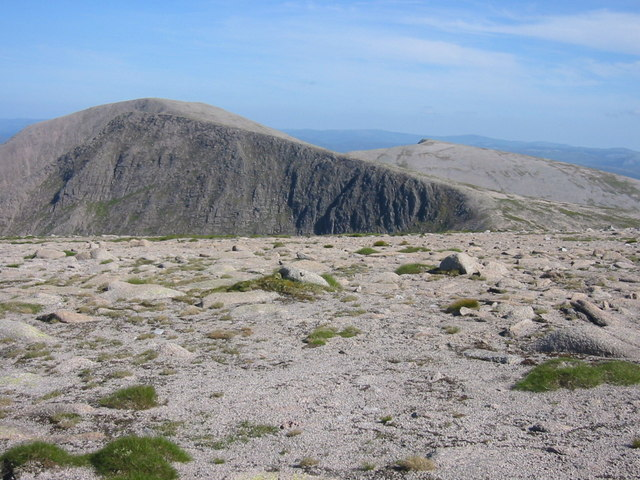
Càrn na Criche, the highest Murdo that is not classed as a Munro

The Murdos apply a quantitive criterion to the Munros and their associated tops, and comprise all of the summits in Scotland over 3,000 feet (914.4 m) with a prominence above 30 metres (98 ft). There are 442 Murdos, compared to 282 Munros (or 508 Munros plus Munro Tops); one of the Munros does not qualify as a Murdo (Maoile Lunndaidh), and 66 of the Munro Tops do not qualify as Murdos.

Alan Dawson first compiled the list in 1995 as an objective and quantitative alternative to the more qualitative SMC definition of a Munro. Dawson's threshold is in line with the 1994 UIAA declaration that an "independent peak" has to have a prominence of over 30 metres (98 ft). Unlike all other Scottish mountain and hill classifications, the SMC does not maintain an official list of Murdos. All Murdos are either SMC Munros or SMC Munro Tops.

=== Corbetts ===
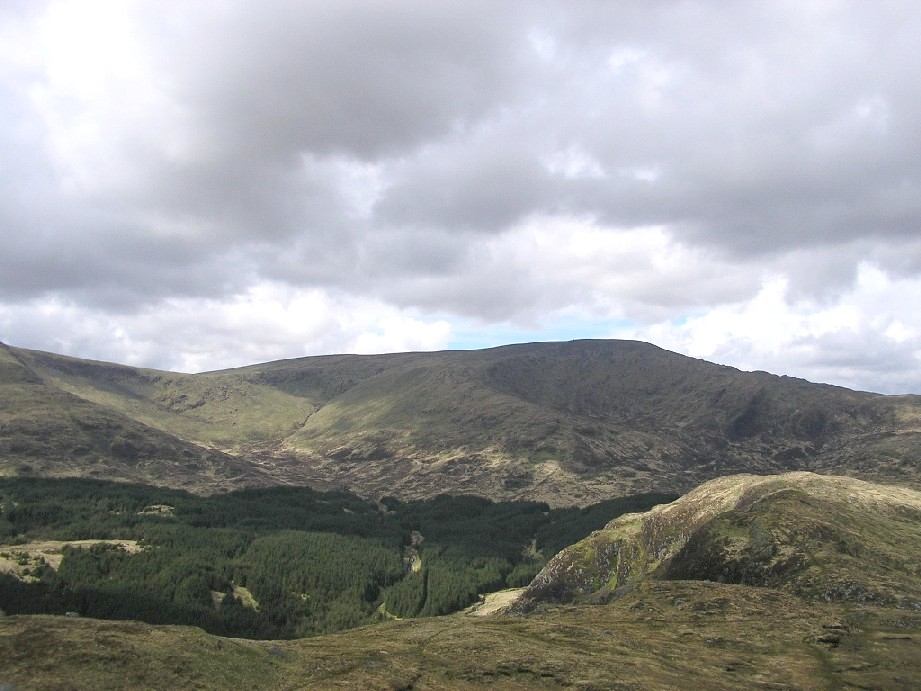
Merrick, in the Southern Uplands, is both a Corbett and a Donald

The Corbetts are peaks in Scotland that are between 2,500 and 3,000 feet (762.0 and 914.4 m) high with a prominence of at least 500 feet (152.4 m). The list was compiled in the 1920s by John Rooke Corbett, a Bristol-based climber and SMC member, and was published posthumously after his sister passed it to the SMC. As of April 2020, there were 222 Corbetts. Climbers who climb all of the Corbetts are called Corbetteers, the first being Corbett himself who completed them in 1943.

A list of Corbett Tops, covering mountains in Scotland between 2,500 and 3,000 feet (762.0 and 914.4 m) in height and with between 100 and 500 feet (30.48 and 152.4 m) of prominence, was published by Alan Dawson in 2001. There are 455 Corbett Tops, and thus 677 Corbetts and Corbett Tops in total.

=== Grahams ===
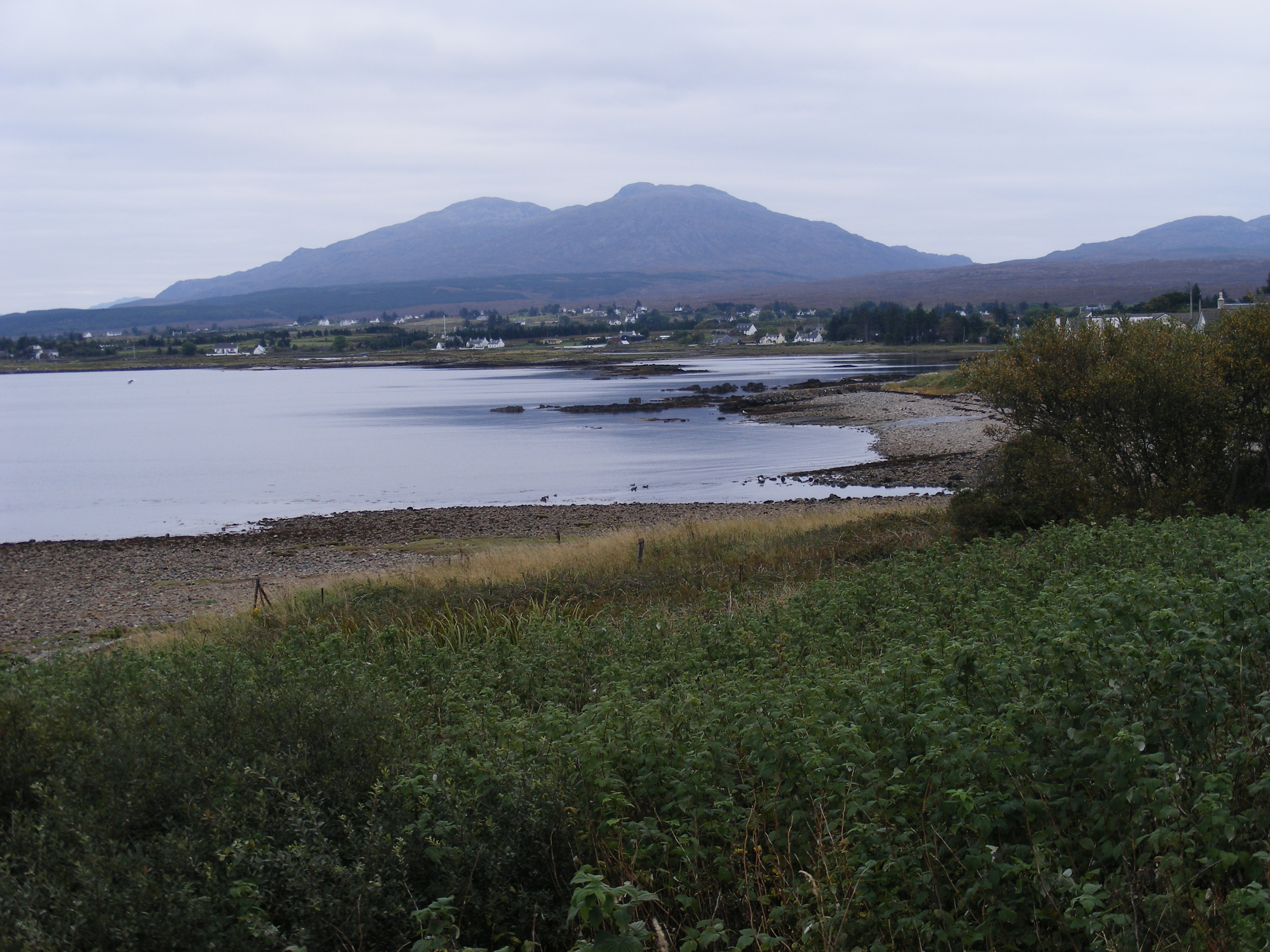
Sgùrr na Coinnich in Skye is the Graham with the greatest prominence

The Grahams are hills in Scotland between 600 and 762 metres (1,969 and 2,500 feet) high, with a drop of at least 150 metres all round. A list of British hills with over 150 metres prominence was first published in 1992 by Alan Dawson in The Relative Hills of Britain, with the subset from 2000 to 2500 feet referred to as Elsies (LCs, short for Lesser Corbetts). The Elsies were later named Grahams after the late Fiona Torbet (née Graham) who published her own list of Scottish hills from 2000 to 2500 feet six months later. Dawson continues to maintain the list, which as of December 2022 comprised 231 hills from 600 to 762 metres high. Two of the original Grahams no longer qualify: Cnoc Coinnich was found to be above the 762 metres (2,500 ft) height threshold, while Stob na Boine Druim-fhinn was found to have less than 150 metres prominence.

In 2004, Dawson published a list of Graham Tops covering every summit in Scotland between 2,000 and 2,500 feet (609.6 and 762.0 m) high with over 30 metres of prominence. This list has since been superseded by the Simms, which include all mountains in Britain over 600 metres high with at least 30 metres prominence.

=== Donalds ===
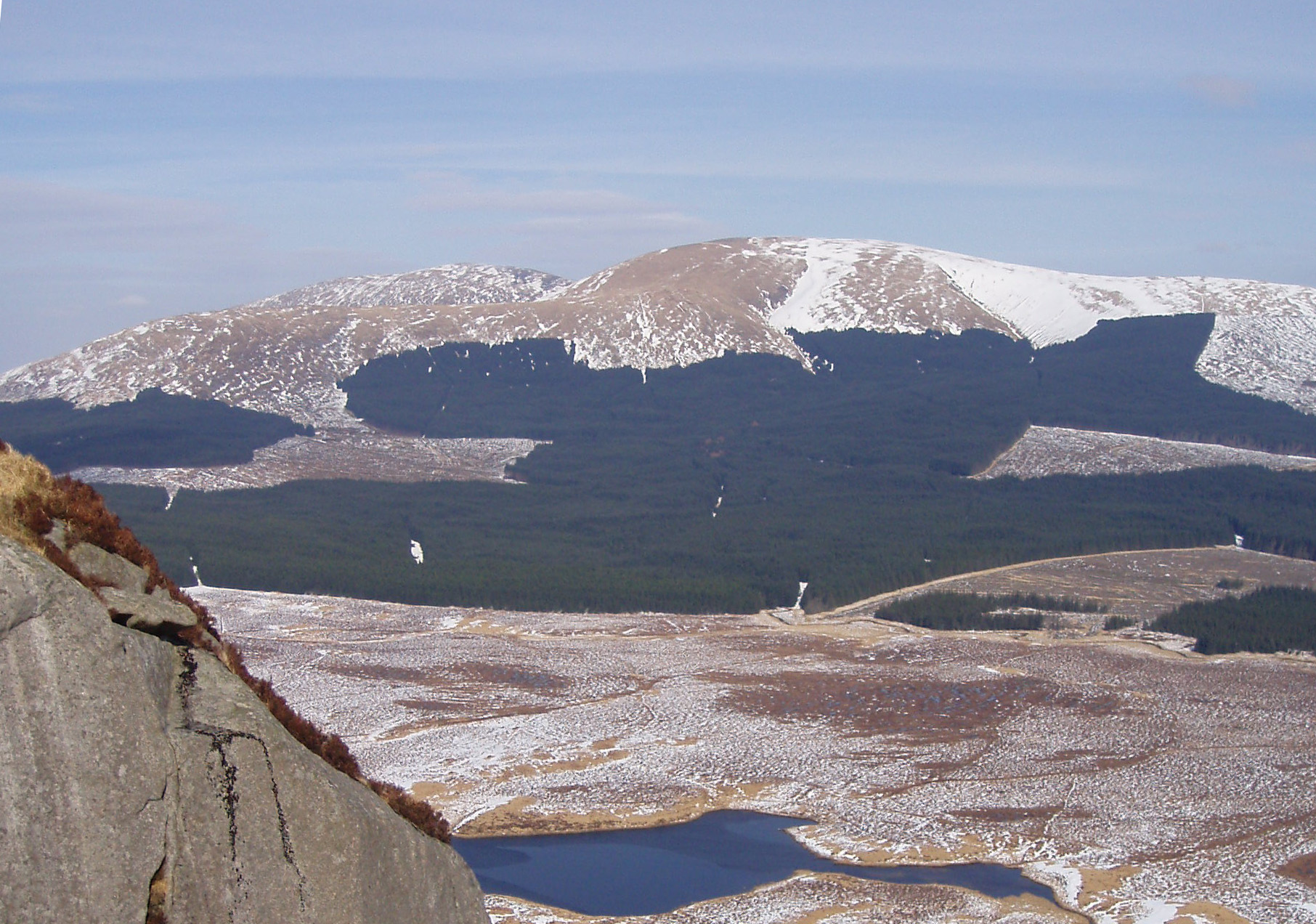
Corserine, the highest point of the Rhinns of Kells range, is a Marilyn, a Donald, and a Corbett

The Donalds are mountains in the Scottish Lowlands over 2,000 ft (610 m), amongst other criteria. The list was compiled by Percy Donald in 1935, and is maintained by the SMC. The classification is determined by a complicated formula which also contains qualitative elements around "sufficient topographical interest". The formula necessitates splitting Donalds into Donald Hills and Donald Tops; in general, Donald Hills have a prominence over 100 feet (30.5 m), but the prominence of Donald Tops can range from 16–220 feet (4.9–67.1 m). Donalds can be Corbetts or Grahams and the SMC state that: "Percy Donald's original Tables are seen as a complete entity, unlike the Munros, Corbetts and Grahams." As of April 2020, there are 140 Donalds, comprising 89 Donald Hills and 51 Donald Tops.

Given the complexity of the Donald classification, the simpler New Donalds was introduced by Alan Dawson in the 1995 TACit booklet The Grahams and the New Donalds, with an explicit prominence threshold of 30 m (98.4 ft); there are 118 New Donalds, and while all Donald Hills are New Donalds, 22 Donald Tops are not. The list is now obsolete, having been subsumed into the Graham Tops in 2004, which were in turn subsumed into the Simms in 2010.

=== Hughs ===
The Hughs (Hills Under Graham Height) are a list compiled by Andrew Dempster, who published The Hughs: Scotland's Best Wee Hills Under 2,000 Feet: Volume 1: The Mainland in 2015. Dempster describes them as "hills with attitude, not altitude" and says "the three key words are prominence, position, panorama". He lists 100 summits in the mainland volume, and plans a second volume to list 100 summits on the islands. As of 2021 they are not listed in the DBIH but have attracted attention from peakbaggers.

== Outside Scotland ==
=== Furths ===
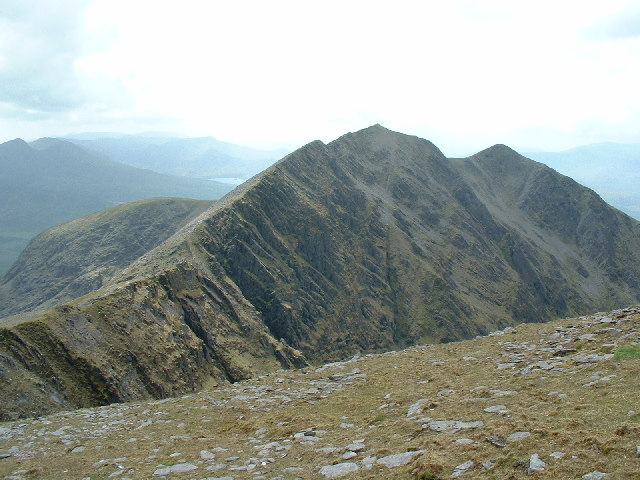
Caher, an Irish Furth, and the only Furth with a prominence below 30 m (Note: 33 of the 34 SMC Furths have a prominence above 30 metres (98 feet), although Caher West Top in Ireland has a prominence of 24 metres (79 feet).)

Furths are mountains in Great Britain and Ireland that are furth of (i.e. "outside") Scotland, and which would otherwise qualify as Scottish Munros or Munro Tops. They are sometimes referred to as the Irish, the English or the Welsh Munros. There are 34 furths; 15 in Wales, 13 in Ireland and six in England. The highest is Snowdon. Of these 34 SMC identified Furths, 33 have a prominence above 30 m (98 ft) (e.g. the Murdo Furths), 14 have a prominence above 150 m (490 ft) (e.g. the Real Munro Furths), and 10 have a prominence above 600 m (2,000 ft) (e.g. the P600 Furths).

The Scottish Mountaineering Club (SMC) maintains the list of Furths and records claims of Munroists who go on to complete the Furths (called "Furthists").

=== Hewitts ===
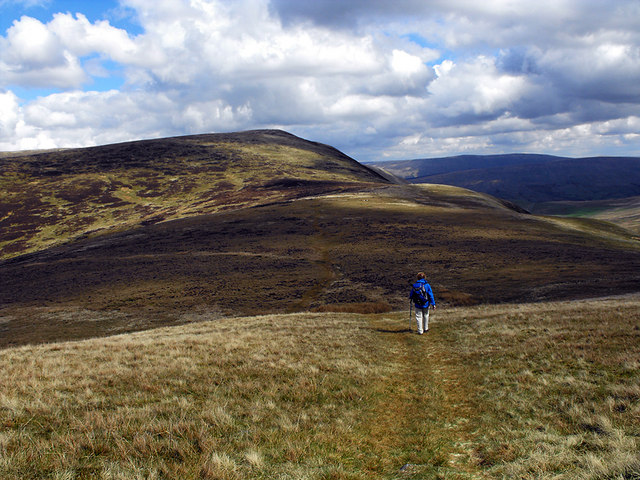
Calf Top in Cumbria, the smallest Hewitt which was confirmed in 2016 as almost exactly 2,000 ft. (Note: The Ordnance Survey confirmed in 2016 that Calf Top was 6 millimetres above the 609.6 m threshold for a 2,000 ft mountain, and confirmed Calf Top as England's "last mountain".)

The Hewitts, named after the initials of their definition, are "hills in England, Wales and Ireland over two thousand" feet (609.6 m), with a relative height of at least 30 metres (98 ft). The English and Welsh, lists were compiled and are maintained by Alan Dawson. Dawson originally called them "Sweats" in his book, from "Summits – Wales and England Above Two thousand". the Irish component was compiled and maintained by Clem Clements up to his death in 2012; it is now maintained by the DoBIH along with his list of Irish Marilyns. The list is a subset of the Nuttall classification (see below), and excludes the 125 least prominent Nuttalls from the list.

As of March 2019, the DoBIH listed 525 Hewitts, 209 in Ireland, 180 in England and 136 in Wales. Since their publication in 1997, Birks Fell and Calf Top in England and Mynydd Graig Goch have been added and Black Mountain deemed to be in Wales only. The combination of Murdos, Corbett Tops and Graham Tops comprise the Scottish equivalent of the Hewitts, but their author Alan Dawson regards those classifications as obsolete. Hewitts are a sub-class of the newer 2010 British Isles classification, the § Simms, or "metric Hewitt", with a 600 metres (1,968.5 ft) height threshold, and a 30 metres (98.4 ft) prominence threshold. Dawson still maintains a list of Hewitts.

=== Nuttalls ===
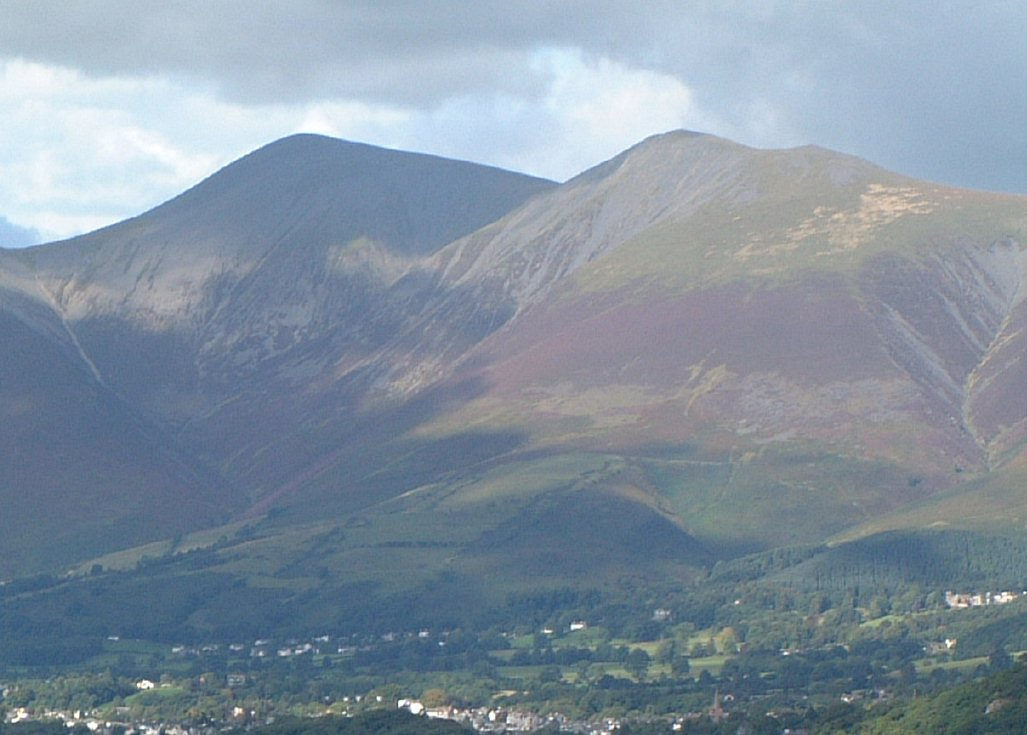
Skiddaw, an English Nuttall

The Nuttalls are mountains in England and Wales only that are over 2,000 feet (610 m), and with a relative height of at least 15 metres (49 ft). There were 444 Nuttalls in the original list (254 in England and 190 in Wales), compiled by John and Anne Nuttall and published in 1989–90 in two volumes, The Mountains of England & Wales. After updates, the total of Nuttalls reached 446 in August 2018 with the inclusion of Miller Moss.

By including high points that rise by as little as 15 metres (49 ft) above their surroundings, the list of Nuttalls is sometimes criticised for including too many insignificant minor tops; the Hewitts (see above) are one attempt to avoid this. Some Nuttalls would not be considered peaks or mountains under UIAA definitions.

With the exception of Pillar Rock, a rocky outcrop on Pillar in the Lake District, the peaks of all of the Nuttalls can be reached without resort to rock climbing. As of October 2018, 302 people are recorded as having completed the list, though this includes some who did not climb Pillar Rock, which the authors permit. They have also announced that Tinside Rigg and Long Fell (added to the list in 2016) need not be summited as they are in a restricted area of Warcop Artillery Range.

== England only ==
=== Wainwrights ===
The Wainwrights are mountains or hills (locally known as fells) in the English Lake District National Park that have a chapter in one of Alfred Wainwright's Pictorial Guides to the Lakeland Fells. There are 214 Wainwrights in the seven guides, and there are no qualifications for inclusion other than Wainwright's choice, although in the introduction he stated that he would include all summits over 1,000-feet in height, with a prominence above 50 feet. An exception was made for Castle Crag in Borrowdale, at 951 feet (290 m); Wainwright stated that although it was below his 1,000-feet criterion, it was a perfect mountain in miniature and demanded inclusion. A further 116 summits were included in the supplementary guide, The Outlying Fells of Lakeland, and are known as the Wainwright Outlying Fells.

=== Birketts ===
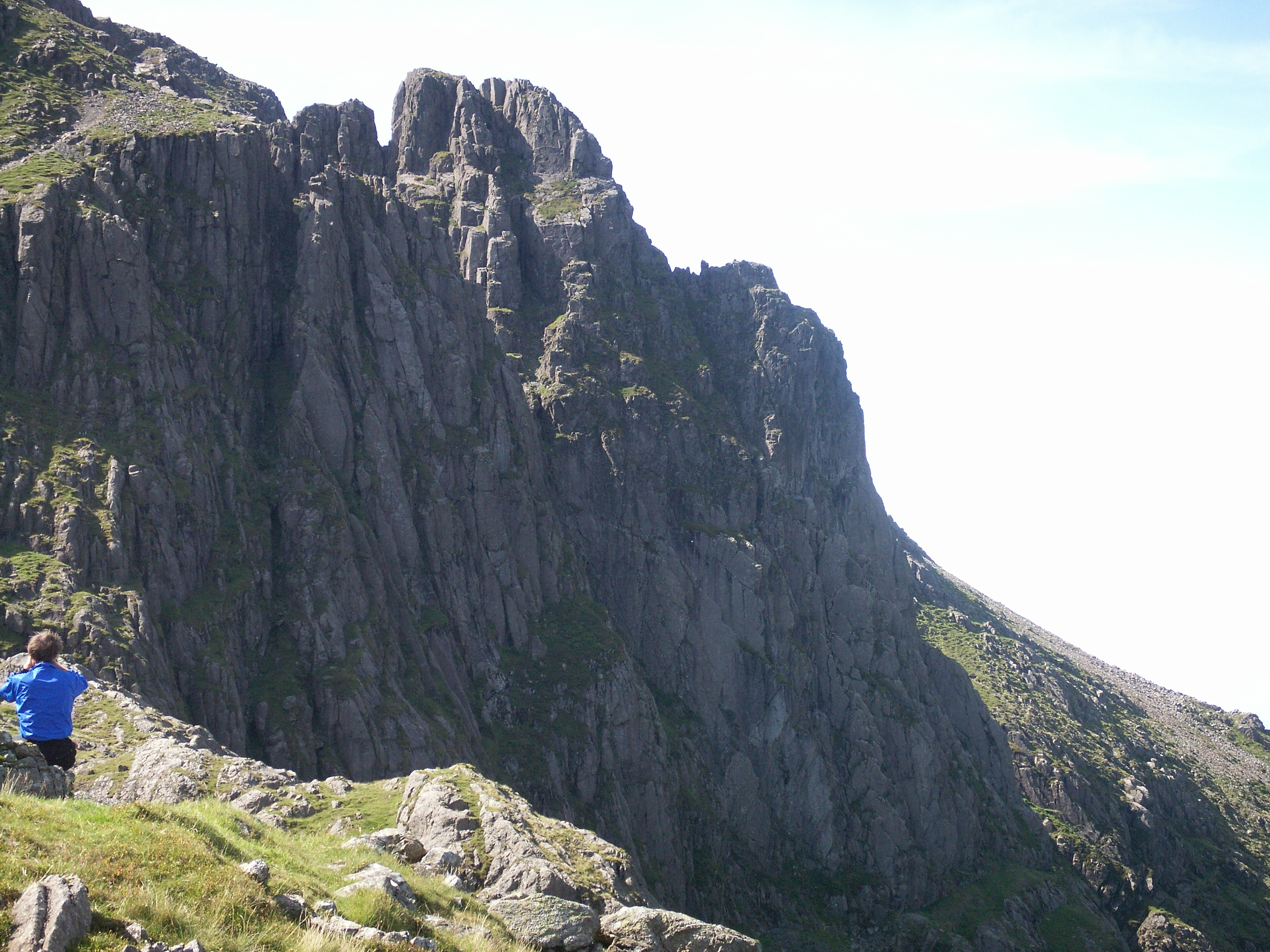
Pillar Rock in the Lake District National Park is the only Birkett where use of ropes is advised.

The Birketts are all the tops over 1,000 feet (304.8 m) within the boundaries of the Lake District National Park. Height and location, but not prominence, are the criteria. The list was devised by Bill Birkett as the basis for his 1994 book Complete Lakeland Fells. There are 541 of these tops, and they include 209 of the 214 Wainwrights, and 59 of the 116 Wainwright Outlying Fells. The five Wainwrights that are not Birketts are Armboth Fell, Baystones, Castle Crag (which, at 951 feet (290 m), is Wainwright's only sub-1,000 ft summit), Graystones and Mungrisdale Common; Birketts are listed in the § Database of British and Irish Hills.

=== Synges ===
The Database of British and Irish Hills recognises as Synges the 670 Lake District summits in Tim Synge's book The Synges (2025). This is an updated edition of his survey: the original survey contained 646 summits as set out in The Lakeland Summits: Survey of the Fells of the Lake District National Park (1995). The current list is available on the Hill Bagging website. There is no height or prominence threshold, although summits above 600 metres in height are separately identified, as are TuMPs.

=== Ethels ===
The Ethels are 95 hills in the Peak District, mostly over 400 m (1,300 ft) above sea level but including various prominent lower hills. Most of the Ethels lie within the Peak District National Park, but others lie outside its borders. The Ethels are a tribute to Ethel Haythornthwaite who pioneered the establishment of the Peak District as Britain's first national park in 1951.

The Peak District and South Yorkshire branch of the CPRE countryside charity announced The Ethels in May 2021. The Ethels were devised in early 2021 by CPRE volunteer Doug Colton.

== Ireland only ==
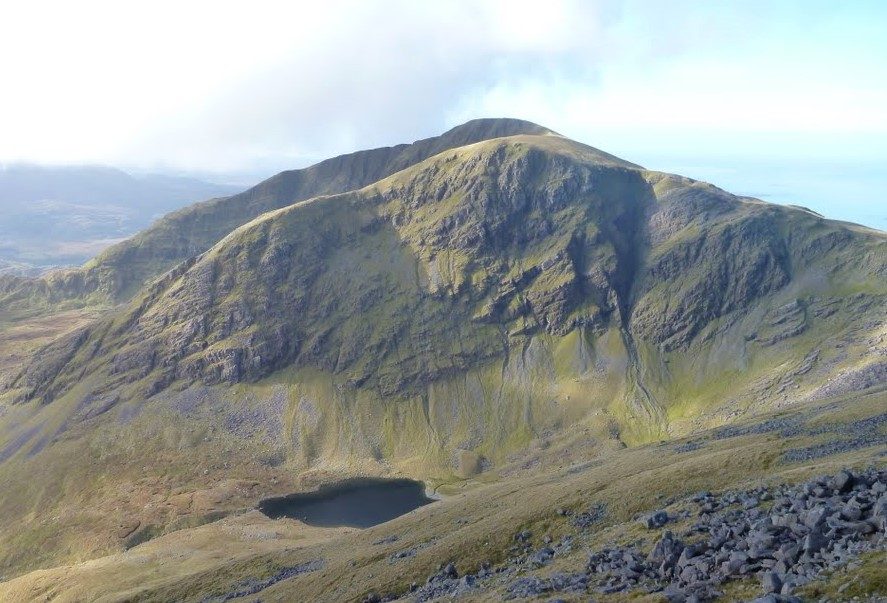
Mweelrea is the highest Provincial Top in Connaught, the highest County Top in Mayo, the 5th highest Irish P600 mountain, the 14th highest Irish Marilyn mountain, the 16th highest Irish MountainViews mountain, the 26th highest Irish Arderin/Hewitt mountain, and the 34th highest Irish Vandeleur-Lynam/Nuttall mountain. It is not a Furth (or Irish Munro), and therefore not a "Real Munro".

=== Vandeleur-Lynams ===
A Vandeleur-Lynam is the Irish equivalent of a Nuttall, except that the definition is fully metric with a height requirement of 600 metres (1,969 ft), and a prominence requirement of 15 metres (49 ft). As with the Nuttalls, Vandeleur-Lynams do not meet the UIAA requirements for a "peak" or for a "mountain". In 1952, Irish climber Joss Lynam made a list of 2,000 ft Irish summits with a 50 ft drop aided by Rev CRP Vandeleur. Lynam updated his list, and published it in the book, Mountaineering in Ireland (1976) by Claude Wall, and later made a metric version published in 1997. There are 274 Vandeleur-Lynams in Ireland.

=== Arderins ===
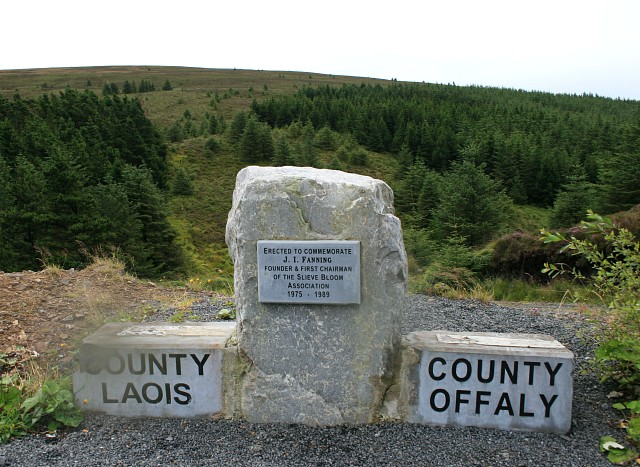
In the background is the summit of Arderin (527 m), the 344th highest Arderin in Ireland, and the Irish County Top for both Laois and Offaly

The Arderins are mountains in Ireland above 500 m (1,640 ft), with a prominence over 30 m (98 ft). The list was drawn up in 2002 by the Irish MountainViews publisher Simon Stewart from an early listing of the Myrddyn Deweys with hills from the Vandeleur-Lynams which meet the higher prominence criterion. The name Arderins was first used in 2009, and comes from the 527-metre (1,729 ft) hill Arderin, which is the County Top for County Laois and County Offaly in Ireland, and translates as "Height of Ireland". The Arderins were published in the 2013 book, "A Guide to Ireland's Mountain Summits: The Vandeleur-Lynams & the Arderins". According to the MountainViews Online Database, Ireland has 407 Arderins, of which 207 are over 2,000 ft and classed as Hewitts, and the 222 are over 600 m and classed as Simms.

In addition, Mountainviews uses the term Arderin Begs for the additional class of peaks over 500 m (1,640 ft) in height, and with a prominence between 15–30 m (49–98 ft); in 2018, Ireland had 124 Arderin Begs.

=== MountainViews ===
In 2013, Simon Stewart, publisher of Irish mountain database MountainViews Online Database, published A Guide to Ireland's Mountain Summits: The Vandeleur-Lynams & the Arderins. In the book, Stewart proposed a new classification of an Irish mountain, being one with a height above 500 m (1,640 ft), and a prominence over 100 m (328 ft). Stewart identified 222 Irish peaks as meeting his new classification. MountainViews used this definition to create the list of 100 Highest Mountains in Ireland, which has also become popular in Ireland.

=== Carns ===
MountainViews and Database of British and Irish Hills recognise a list of 337 summits as Carns, having height above 100 m (328 ft) and below 400 m (1,312 ft), and with a prominence over 30 metres (98 ft).

=== Binnions ===
MountainViews and Database of British and Irish Hills recognise a list of 484 summits as Binnions, having a prominence of at least 100 m (328 ft) and a height below 400 m (1,312 ft). Binnion Hill is a peak of 250 metres (820 ft) in height in County Donegal, site of the Battle of Binnion Hill, and possibly the source of the name.

== Wales only ==
The Mud and Routes website includes a list of WASHIS: Welsh And Six Hundred In Stature, 118 summits which are over 600 m (1,969 ft) and have a prominence of at least 50 metres (160 ft), with the comment that "Wales doesn't have a list of summits in its own right", but the term does not appear to have been adopted elsewhere.

== County tops ==
Climbing to the highest point of each county is a form of peak bagging, dating back to the 1920s when John Rooke Corbett was attempting to visit all British County Tops.

- List of counties of England and Wales in 1964 by highest point
- List of ceremonial counties of England by highest point
- List of Welsh principal areas by highest point
- List of Scottish counties by highest point
- List of Scottish council areas by highest point
- List of Irish counties by highest point

== Other active lists ==
=== Deweys ===
The Deweys and related categories extend the Hewitts of England, Wales and Ireland to 500 metres, and include summits in Scotland, where there are no Hewitts.

- The Deweys are peaks in England, Wales and the Isle of Man between 500 metres and 2,000 feet (609.6 metres) in height, with a prominence of at least 30 metres (98 feet), which were listed by Michael Dewey in 1995. Deweys extend the England and Wales Hewitts below 2,000 feet, but above 500 metres. There are 426 Deweys identified: 241 in Wales, 180 in England, and five in the Isle of Man.
- The Donald Deweys are peaks in the Scottish lowlands (similar to the Donald classification), between 500 metres and 2,000 feet (609.6 metres) in height, with a prominence of at least 30 metres (98 feet), which were listed by David Purchase in 2001. Donald Deweys are the Scottish lowland equivalent of Deweys. There are 248 Donald Deweys.
- The Highland Fives are peaks in the Scottish highlands, originally between 500 metres and 2,000 feet (609.6 metres) metres in height, with a prominence of at least 30 metres (98 feet). Thus they were the Scottish Highland equivalent of the Deweys. The first listing was compiled by Rob Woodall in 2003 using contributions from Tony Payne and others. The list was adopted by The Database of British and Irish Hills in 2011, who overhauled the list and with Woodall's agreement took over its maintenance and named it the Highland Fives. The upper height limit was reduced from 2000 ft (609.6m) to 600 metres in December 2022 in tandem with Alan Dawson's reduction of the lower height limit of the Graham Tops to 600 metres. There are 713 Highland Fives.
- The Myrddyn Deweys are peaks in Ireland, between 500 metres and 2,000 feet (609.6 metres) in height with a prominence above 30 metres (98 feet), listed by Michael Dewey and Myrddyn Phillips and made freely available to the Mountaineering Council of Ireland in 2000. Myrddyn Deweys are the Irish equivalent of Deweys. The data was overhauled in 2011 but has not been further revised to take account of changes in height and prominence resulting from surveys by MountainViews and new mapping. There are 200 Myrddyn Deweys.

=== Hardys ===
A Hardy is the highest point of a UK, Manx or Channel Island hill range, a UK island over 1,000 acres (400 hectares) or 4.05 km^{2}) or a UK top-tier administrative area (counties and unitary authorities). There are now 347 Hardys with the recent addition (up to July 2016) of five low lying English coastal estuary islands: 61 hill ranges, 96 islands and 190 administrative areas. 183 are in England, 31 in Wales, 107 in Scotland and 26 in Northern Ireland. The list was first compiled in the 1990s by Ian Hardy.

== Non-active lists ==
=== Bridges ===
The Database of British and Irish Hills recognises as Bridges the 407 summits in George Bridge's Mountains of England and Wales: Tables of the 2000ft Summits (1973). Bridge used a prominence threshold of 50 feet (15 m), but was hampered by the accuracy of the maps available at the time, and the list was effectively replaced by the Nuttalls, which uses the metric equivalent of 15 m – 49 ft.

=== Buxton & Lewis ===
The Database of British and Irish Hills recognises as Buxton & Lewis the 422 summits in Mountain Summits of England and Wales (1986) by Chris Buxton and Gwyn Lewis. Buxton and Lewis used a prominence threshold of two contour rings on the OS 1:50,000 map, and the number of hills is similar to the Nuttalls and the Bridges.

=== Clems ===
The Database of British and Irish Hills recognises as Clems the 1,284 summits in the list Yeamans of England & Wales compiled in 1993 by E. D. Clements, known as Clem, by applying Yeaman's criterion of "an eminence which has an ascent of 100m all round, or, failing that, is at least 5 km (walking distance) from any higher point on neighbouring hills" to summits in England, Wales and the Isle of Man, together with 14 summits which he added later. They were named Clems after his death, and formed the basis of the later list of HuMPs.

=== Fellrangers ===
The Database of British and Irish Hills recognises as Fellrangers the 230 (originally 227) Lake District summits in Mark Richards' Fellranger series of eight guidebooks (originally published by HarperCollins, starting with Central Fells ISBN 9780007113651; reprinted by Cicerone Press; 2013 boxed set ISBN 978-1852847487; new editions 2019–2021), A list is available on the HillBagging website. There is no height or prominence threshold. The original list included 18 fells not included in the 214 Wainwrights, some of which are listed among Wainwright's "Outlying fells". The 2019–2021 edition includes a further three summits to bring the total to 230, the additions being Winterscleugh (Bretherdale Common), Whinfell Beacon and Grayrigg Forest, all in the Mardale and the far east volume.

=== Yeamans ===
The Database of British and Irish Hills recognises as Yeamans (sometimes spelled Yeomans) the 2,441 summits identified by Eric Yeaman in his Handbook of the Scottish Hills (1989, Arbroath:Wafaida ISBN 0951432400) with later changes. His criterion was "an eminence which has an ascent of 100 m all round, or, failing that, is at least 5 km (walking distance) from any higher point on neighbouring hills". Yeamans produced an update in 2001, and the list was used as the basis by those developing the later list of HuMPs, but the category is now considered to be "historic" and has not been updated since 2001.

== Regional lists ==
The following are lists of hills for a given region in the British Isles:

England:

- List of hills of Cornwall
- List of hills of Dorset
- List of hills of Gloucestershire
- List of hills of Hampshire
- List of hills of Wiltshire
- List of hills in the Peak District

== See also ==
- List of mountain lists
- Lists of mountains
- List of mountains of the British Isles by height
