= David Corbett (footballer, born 1910) =

Scottish footballer

Personal information
- Full name: David John Corbett
- Date of birth: 1 February 1910
- Place of birth: Camelon, Scotland
- Date of death: 1995 (aged 84–85)
- Position: Right half

Senior career*
Years	Team	Apps	(Gls)
- Old Plean Amateurs
- Linlithgow Rose
1929–1930	Heart of Midlothian	0	(0)
1930–1932	Camelon Juniors		
1932–1933	Ayr United	6	(0)
1933–1936	Dundee United	84	(6)
1936–1937	West Ham United	4	(0)
- Southport
1941–1942	Dumbarton (wartime)		
- St Mirren (wartime)
1945	Dundee United (wartime)		
- * Club domestic league appearances and goals

David John Corbett (1 February 1910 – 1995) was a Scottish professional footballer who played as a right half.

== Career ==
Born in Camelon, Corbett played for Old Plean Amateurs, Linlithgow Rose, Heart of Midlothian, Camelon Juniors, Ayr United, Dundee United, West Ham United, Southport, Dumbarton and St Mirren.

Corbett joined Dundee United on trial at the beginning of the 1933–34 season, playing the first two matches as a trialist prior to signing for the club. He went to feature as an ever-present for United up until suffering a serious injury in November 1935, although he returned to the side two months later. Despite the club retaining his registration in the close season of 1936, he didn't appear in the United team again and was transferred to West Ham that October. He would later return to Dundee United for one Southern League match in October 1945.

== Personal life ==
Corbett had two younger brothers who were both professional footballers – Norman and Willie.
