= When Helping Hurts =

2009 book by Steve Corbett and Brian Fikkert

When Helping Hurts: Alleviating Poverty Without Hurting the Poor... and Yourself
- Author: Steve Corbett, Brian Fikkert
- Language: English
- Genre: Non-fiction
- Publisher: Moody Publishers
- Publication date: June 24, 2009
- Publication place: United States
- Media type: Print, e-book
- Pages: 232 pages
- ISBN: 0802457053

When Helping Hurts: Alleviating Poverty Without Hurting the Poor... and Yourself is a 2009 non-fiction book by Steve Corbett and Brian Fikkert. The book was first published on June 24, 2009, through Moody Publishers and explores and dissects common perceptions on poverty and the means to relieve it, from a Christian perspective. In 2012, Moody published a revised, second edition. By June 2015, When Helping Hurts had sold more than 300,000 copies and been translated into five languages.

== Synopsis ==
When Helping Hurts uses the Bible and the Great Commission to state that the church's mission should be to help the poor and the desolate. Corbett and Fikkert state that the definition of poverty will change depending on who is defining it, with the poor defining it through the psychological and social scope while more wealthy churches emphasize the lack of material things or a geographical location. The authors emphasize that this can cause a harmful cycle where North American churches provide material resources and evangelism to the poor, which reinforces the poor people's sense of inferiority and lack of self-esteem, which in turn increases the original problem. Corbett and Fikkert give several hypothetical scenarios to illustrate this cycle and then offer several solutions that they say can alleviate poverty. They promote the use of asset-based community development as a strategy, arguing that focusing on what resources and abilities that the community already has is often more helpful and more empowering than focusing on what the community doesn't have. This prevents paternalism where outside workers provide the "only" answer.

== Structure ==
The book was originally divided into three parts: the mission of the church and the Christian view of poverty, discussion on poverty and examples of harmful poverty alleviation, and strategies for addressing poverty. The second edition added a fourth part that gave additional resources to bring about real change in church and community.

=== Christian view of poverty ===
According to the authors, the Christian view of poverty comes from a proper understanding of why Jesus came to earth, namely, to bring healing to the entire cosmos and be supreme over all the universe. They cite a model Bryant L. Myers develops in Walking with the Poor: Principles and Practices of Transformational Development that describes humans as being in relationship with God, Self, Others, and the Rest of Creation. This comes from the concept that God originally designed humans in His image, and therefore as relational beings. This contrasts with a view that Jesus came only to save mankind from their sin so they could go to heaven. Referring to Colossians 1, they say Jesus came not only to save souls, but also to reconcile all things to God, or "to put into right relationship all that He created". They quote Bryant Myers, "Poverty is the result of relationships that do not work, that are not just, that are not for life, that are not harmonious or enjoyable. Poverty is the absence of shalom in all its meanings." Lesa Engelthaler in Christianity Today wrote that the premise of the book is that, "in one way or the other, every human being is poor."

== Reception ==
Reception for When Helping Hurts has been positive, with World magazine's Joel Belz calling it "solid stuff". Mission Studies gave a positive review for When Helping Hurts, saying it was "based on good theological premises" and "is a very useful and accessible contribution to Christian relief and development". Charity organization Children of the Nations cited it as one of their "favorite books" and as a recommended read.

== Criticism ==
When asked if he has regrets about the book, Fikkert said that he has found many people stop helping for fear that it is causing unintended hurt, saying some call it "When Helping Hurts paralysis". He said this misses the point, "The point was a pause and some redirection." In the Preface of the second edition, they address this, saying Christians should multiply their efforts, while considering their methods of helping the poor.
