= Corbett =

Corbett may refer to:

== Places ==
- List of Corbetts (mountains), 222 mountains in Scotland between 2,500 and 3,000 feet (760 and 910 m), with prominence over 500 feet (152 m)
- Corbett, New York, a hamlet in New York State
- Corbett, Oklahoma, a ghost town in Oklahoma
- Corbett, Oregon, a community in Oregon

== People ==
- Corbett (surname), people with the surname Corbett
- Corbett family, a family named Corbett
- Corbett Price (born 1950/1951), an American political donor and health care business and financial consultant

== Other ==
- Corbett Award, US award for athletics administrators

== See also ==
- Corbet, the old English or Anglo-Norman spellings of Corbett or Corbeau
- Corbet (surname)
- Courbet (disambiguation)
