= Corbitt =

Corbitt is a surname. Notable people with the surname include:

- Claude Corbitt (1915–1978), American baseball player
- Don Corbitt (1924–1993), American football player
- Gregory Corbitt (born 1971), Australian field hockey player
- Helen Corbitt (1906 – 1978), American chef and cookbook author
- James Corbitt (1913–1950), English murderer
- Michael J. Corbitt (1944–2004), American police chief
- Ted Corbitt (1919–2007), American long-distance runner
- Willa Wales Corbitt, American politician

== See also ==
- Corbitt (automobile company), an American automobile, truck, and farm equipment manufacturer
- Corbett (surname)
