= William Corbet (disambiguation) =

William Corbet may refer to:

- William Corbet (1779–1842), Irish soldier
- William Corbet (MP) for Worcestershire (UK Parliament constituency)
- William Corbet (MP fl.1318), MP for Gloucestershire (UK Parliament constituency)
- Sir William Corbet, 5th Baronet (1702–1748), of the Corbet baronets
- William Joseph Corbet (1824–1909), Irish nationalist politician and Member of Parliament

== See also ==
- William Corbett (disambiguation)
- Corbet (surname)
