= Uvedale Corbett =

Uvedale Corbett may refer to:

- Uvedale Corbett (politician) (1909–2005), British soldier, politician and businessman
- Uvedale Corbett Junior, Poor Law inspector
- Sir Uvedale Corbet (1668–1701), 3rd of the Corbet baronets
- Uvedale Corbett, barrister, son of Archdeacon Joseph Corbett of Longnor, Shropshire and brother of Panton Corbett

== See also ==
- Corbett (surname)
