= Grayrigg Forest =

Hill in Cumbria, England

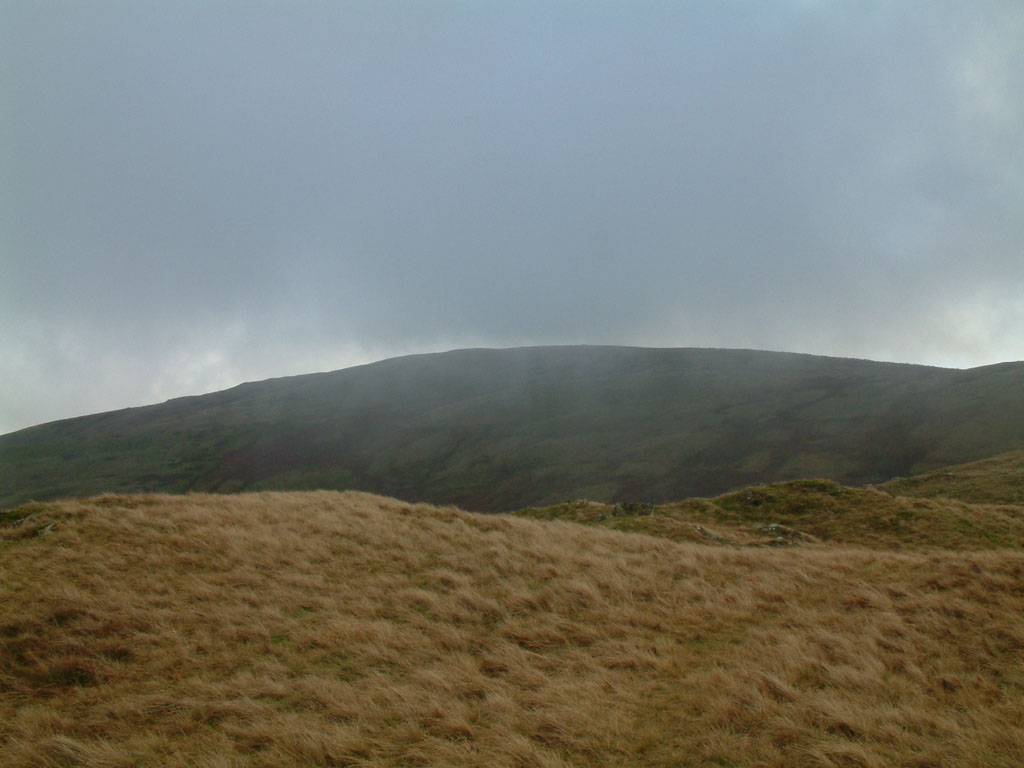
- Grayrigg Forest from further west on Grayrigg Common

Highest point
- Elevation: 494 m (1,621 ft)
- Prominence: 190 m (620 ft)
- Parent peak: High Street
- Listing: Marilyn, Fellranger, Hump, Tump, Clem
- Coordinates: 54°23′31″N 2°37′14″W

Geography
- Location within the Lake District
- Location: Lake District, England
- OS grid: SD598998
- Topo map: OS Landranger 97

Grayrigg Forest is a hill in Cumbria, England, located on the eastern edge of what might be considered the Lake District. In August 2016 it became part of the eponymous national park. Reaching 494 metres (1,621 ft) above sea level, its summit is attainable from the less well-known Borrowdale valley.

From near the summit, there are impressive views down into the gorge of the Lune valley, where road, West Coast Main Line railway, M6 motorway and the River Lune crowd between the outliers of the Lake District and the Howgill Fells.

It is one of three summits, along with Winterscleugh and Whinfell Beacon, added to the list of Fellrangers in the 2019–2021 edition of Mark Richards' eight volumes of guidebooks, bringing the list to a total of 230. They were added when the Lake District National Park boundary was extended in 2019, including them for the first time.

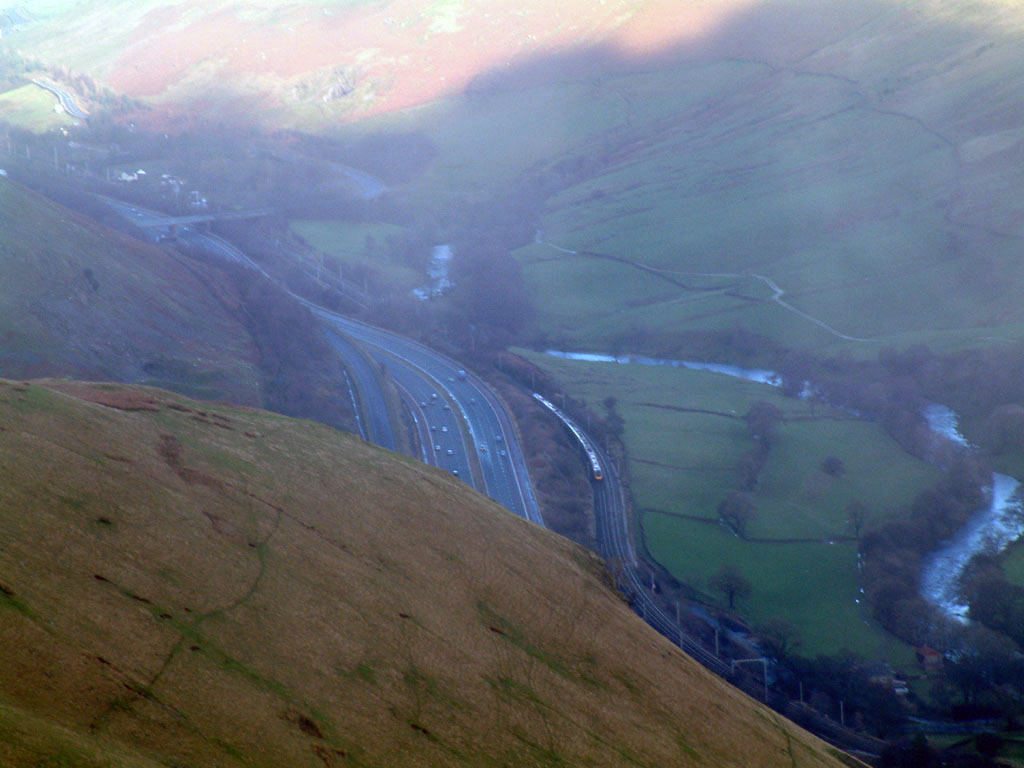
The Lune valley with M6 motorway and West Coast Main Line railway from near the summit of Grayrigg Forest
