= Norman Corbett =

Scottish footballer (1919–1990)

Personal information
- Full name: Norman George Corbett
- Date of birth: 23 June 1919
- Place of birth: Camelon, Scotland
- Date of death: June 1990 (aged 70–71)
- Place of death: Derby, England
- Position: Right half

Youth career
- 1934–1935: Heart of Midlothian

Senior career*
Years	Team	Apps	(Gls)
1935–1936	Heart of Midlothian	0	(0)
1935–1936	→ Musselburgh Athletic		
1937–1950	West Ham United	166	(3)
- * Club domestic league appearances and goals

Norman George Corbett (23 June 1919 – June 1990) was a Scottish footballer who played as a right-half.

== Career ==
Born in Camelon, Falkirk, as a schoolboy Corbett captained the Falkirk team that won the Scottish Schools Trophy. He also played for Scotland Boys. He signed for Heart of Midlothian at the age of 15 although never played a competitive first team game for the Edinburgh club. While farmed out at Musselburgh Athletic, he played for Scotland Juniors three times (including twice as captain, the youngest-ever player to do so).

Corbett played for West Ham United between April 1937 and 1950. In a career that was badly affected by World War II, he made a total of 306 appearances for the club, including war competitions, scoring eight goals. He won a Football League War Cup winners medal in 1940, although he did not appear in the final, and was an ever-present for the Irons during the 1947–48 season.

After the outbreak of the war, Corbett served as a volunteer with the Essex Regiment, and guested for Southampton.

Corbett played his last League game for West Ham against Cardiff City on 15 April 1950, and appeared only for the reserve team after that. He later became a coach and joined Clapton.

Norman Corbett was brother of Hammers player David (who was also a right-half) and Willie, who guested for the club during World War II.
