= Microcellular plastic =

Microcellular plastics, otherwise known as microcellular foam, is a form of manufactured plastic fabricated to contain billions of tiny bubbles less than 50 microns wide (typically 0.1–100 micrometers). It is formed by dissolving gas under high pressure into various polymers, relying on the phenomenon of thermodynamic instability to cause the uniform arrangement of the gas bubbles, otherwise known as nucleation. Its main purpose was to reduce material usage while maintaining valuable mechanical properties. the density of the finished product is determined by the gas used. Depending on the gas, the foam's density can be between 5% and 99% of the pre-processed plastic. Design parameters, focused on the foam's final form and the molding process afterward, include the type of die or mold to be used, as well as the dimensions of the bubbles, or cells, that classify the material as a foam. Since the cells' size is close to the wavelength of light, to the casual observer the foam retains the appearance of a solid, light-colored plastic.

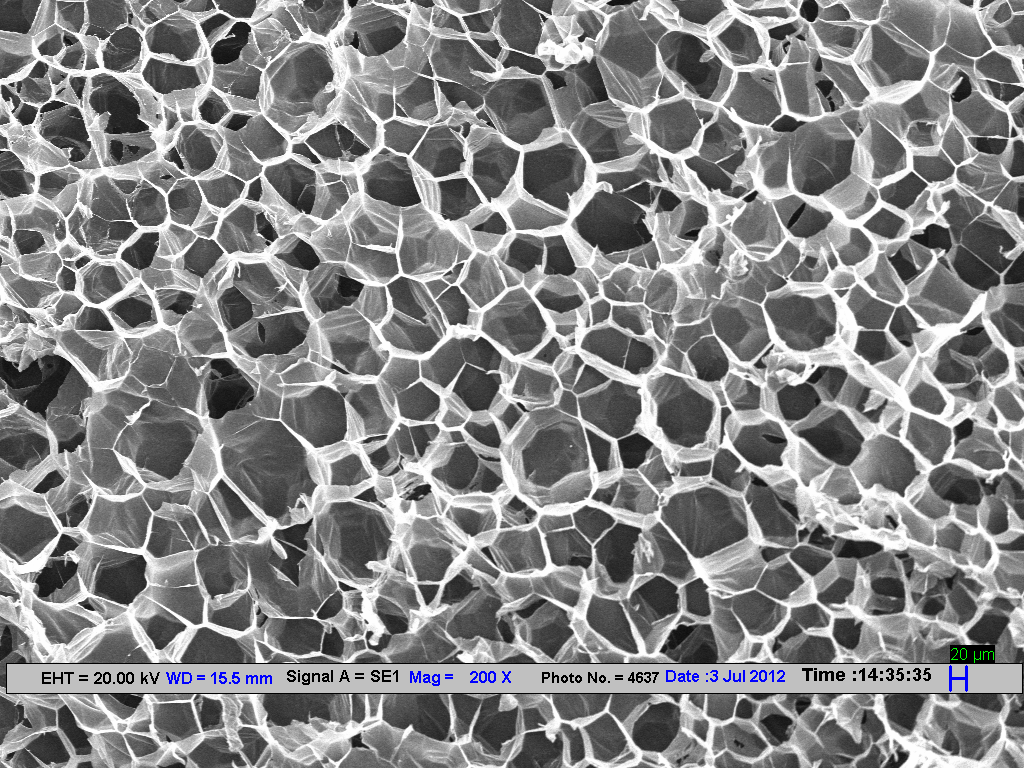
Microcellular Plastic Micrograph developed at Indian Institute of Technology, Delhi

Recent developments at the University of Washington have produced nanocellular foams with cells in the 20-100 nanometer range. At Indian Institute of Technology Delhi, technologies are being developed to fabricate high quality microcellular foams.

== History ==
Prior to 1974, traditional foams were created using a method outlined in U.S Patent named Mixing of Molten Plastic and Gas in 1974. By releasing a gas, otherwise known as a chemical or physical blowing agent, over molten plastic, hard plastic was converted into traditional foam. The results of these methods were highly undesirable. Due to the uncontrolled nature of the process, the product was often non-uniform, housing many large voids. In turn, the outcome was a low strength, low density foam, with large cells in the cellular structure. The pitfalls of this method drove the need for a process that could make a similar material with more advantageous mechanical properties.

The creation of microcellular foams as we know today was inspired by the production of traditional foams. In 1979, MIT masters students J.E. Martini and F.A Waldman, under the direction of Professor Nam P Suh, are both accredited with the invention of microcellular plastics, or microcellular foams. By doing pressurized extrusion and injection molding, their experimentation led to a method that used significantly less material and a product with 5-30% less voids that were less than 8 microns in size. In terms of mechanical properties, the fracture toughness of the material improved by 400% and the resistance to crack propagation increased by 200%. First, plastic is uniformly saturated with gas at a high pressure. Then, the temperature is increased, causing thermal instability in the plastic. In order to reach a stable state, cell nucleation takes place. During this step, the cells created would be much smaller than that of traditional foams. After this, cell growth, or matrix relaxation would initiate. The novelty of this method was the ability to control the mechanical properties of the product by varying the temperature and pressure inputs. For example, by modifying the pressure, a very thin outside layer could be formed, making the product even stronger. Experimental results found CO_{2} to be the gas that produced the densest foams. Other gases, such as Argon and Nitrogen produced foams with mechanical properties that were slightly less desirable.

== Production ==
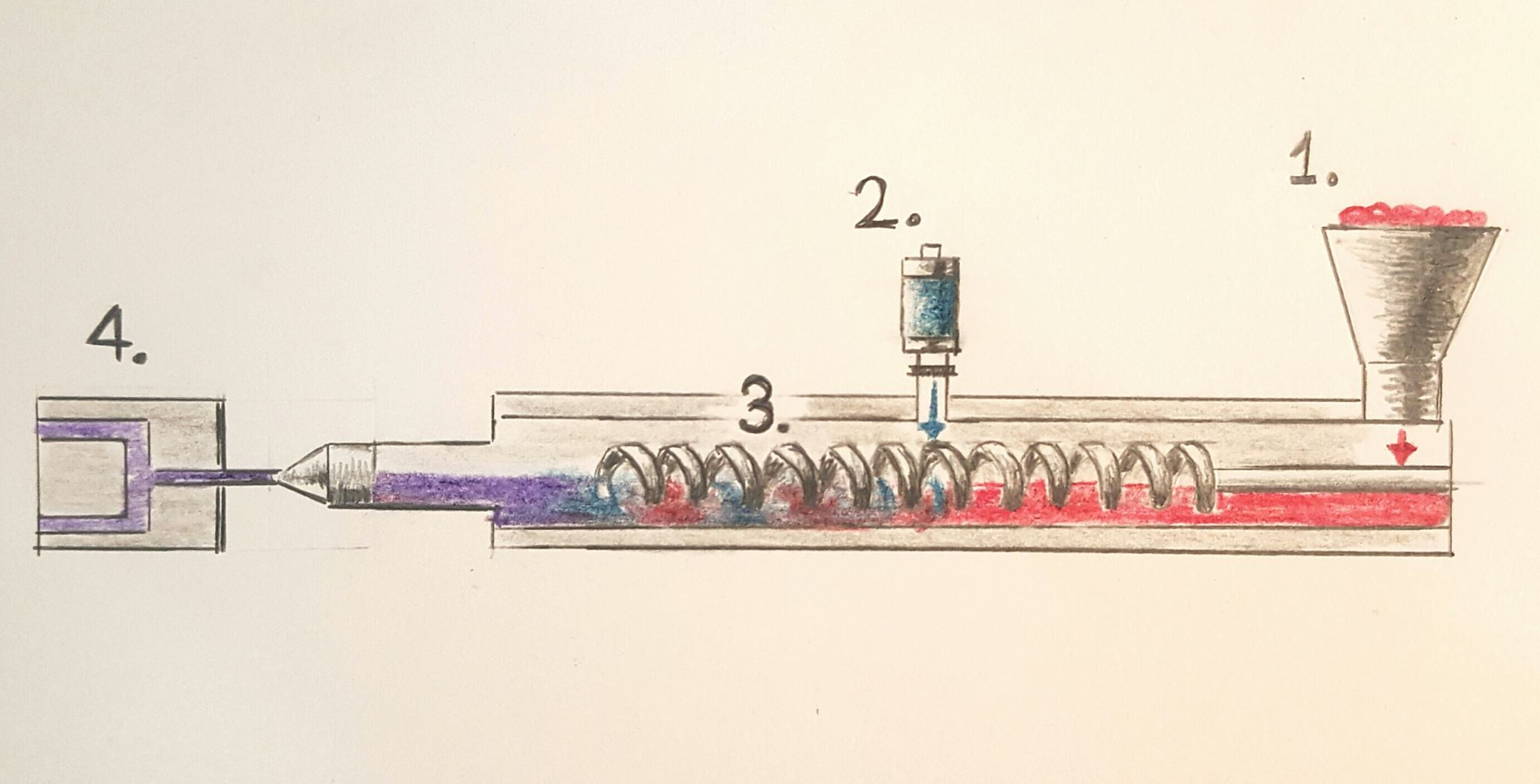
Schematic example of the general manufacturing process 1. Polymer base (red) is liquified & added. 2. Precise amounts of supercritical fluid (blue), such as Nitrogen or Carbon-dioxide, are injected into the polymer mix. 3. Homogeneous mixing to create a single phase solution (purple). 4. Polymer is injected into mold cavity. the low pressure prompts the supercritical fluid cells to nucleate and fill out the mold in a uniform manner.

When selecting a gas to produce the desired foam, functional requirements and design parameters are considered. The functional requirements are identical to the criteria used when inventing this material type; using less plastic without sacrificing mechanical properties (especially toughness) that are capable of making the same three dimensional products the original plastic was able to do.

The production of microcellular plastics is dependent on temperature and pressure. Dissolving gas under high temperature and pressure creates a driving force that activates nucleation sites when the pressure drops, which increases exponentially with amount of dissolved gas.

Homogeneous nucleation is the primary mechanism for producing the bubbles in the cellular matrix. The dissolved gas molecules have a preference to diffuse to activation sites that have nucleated first. This is prevented since these sites are activated nearly simultaneously, forcing the dissolved gas molecules to be shared equally and uniform throughout the plastic.

Removing the plastic from the high pressure environment creates a thermodynamic instability. Heating the polymer above the effective glass transition temperature (of the polymer/gas mixture) then causes the plastic to foam, creating a very uniform structure of small bubbles.

== Mechanical properties ==
The density of microcellular plastics has the greatest influence on the behavior and performance. The material tensile strength linearly decreases with the material density as more gas is dissolved into the part. Melting temperature and viscosity also decrease as well.

The foam injection process itself introduces surface defects such as swirl marks, streaking, and blistering, which also influence how the part reacts to external forces.

== Advantages and disadvantages ==
Due to the non-hazardous nature of this foam-generating process, these plastics are able to be recycled and put back into the production cycle, reducing their carbon footprint as well as reducing the cost of raw materials.

With the porous nature of this material, the overall density is much lower than that of any solid plastic, considerably dropping the weight per unit volume of the part. This also entails less consumption of raw plastic with the addition of the tiny gas-filled pockets, allowing for further cost reduction, up to 35%.

When observing the mechanical properties of these foams, a loss of tensile strength is correlated with the decrease in density, in a nearly linear fashion.

== Industrial applications ==
Since the steps taken by MIT research in the late 70s, microcellular plastics, and their methods of manufacturing, has become more standardized and improved upon. Trexel Inc. is often referred to as the industry standard for microcellular plastics with their use of MuCell® Molding Technology. Trexel, and other manufacturers of microcellular plastics, use both injection molding and blow mold methods to create products for applications such as automotive, medical, packaging, consumer, and industrial.

Injection molding and blow molding differ in regards to the type of product in need of being manufactured. Injection molding, much like casting, is centered around creating a mold for a solid object, which is to later be filled in with the molten plastic. Blow molding on the other hand, is more specialized for hollow objects, although it is less accurate regarding wall thickness with this dimension being an undefined feature (unlike in an injection mold where all dimensions are predetermined). In respect to MuCell® and microcellular plastics, these processes vary from that of traditional plastics due to the additional steps of gas dissolving and cell nucleation before the molding process can begin. This process removed the "pack and hold phase" that allowed for imperfections within a mold, creating a finished product with greater dimensional accuracy and sound structure. By removing an entire step of the molding process, time is saved, making MuCell® a more economical option since more parts can be manufactured in the same time compared to standard resins. A few examples of applications include automobile instrument panels, heart pumps, storage bins, and the housing on multiple household power tools.

== See also ==
- acrylonitrile
- butadiene
- styrene
