= Leo Corbett =

Australian rules footballer

Personal information
- Full name: Leo James Corbett
- Born: 25 June 1895; Sandringham, Victoria
- Died: 19 September 1959 (aged 64); South Yarra, Victoria
- Original team: Sandringham
- Height: 191 cm (6 ft 3 in)
- Weight: 86 kg (190 lb)

Playing career^{1}
Years	Club	Games (Goals)
1919	St Kilda	1 (0)
- ^{1} Playing statistics correct to the end of 1919.

Leo James Corbett (25 June 1895 – 19 September 1959) was an Australian rules footballer who played with St Kilda in the Victorian Football League (VFL).
