= M. E. Grenander =

American academic and philanthropist

Mary Elizabeth Grenander (21 November 1918 – 28 May 1998), was a professor of English and philanthropist, for whom the M.E. Grenander Department of Special Collections & Archives of the University Libraries of the University at Albany, the State University of New York is named. She was an authority on Ambrose Bierce.

Grenander was born in Rewey, Wisconsin. She served in the U.S. Navy during the Second World War. She received an AB (1940), AM (1941), and PhD (1948) from the University of Chicago, each in English. Grenander taught at the State University of New York at Albany from 1948 until her retirement as Distinguished Service Professor of English in 1989. She directed the university's Institute of Humanistic Studies from 1977 to 1980.

She and her second husband, James Corbett (a professor of physics at SUNY), prospered through long-term investment in the stock market, and she was able to contribute $1 million to SUNY in his memory after his death in 1994.

Grenander died in East Berne, New York, at 79 years of age.
