= Will Corbett =

American actor

William D. Corbett
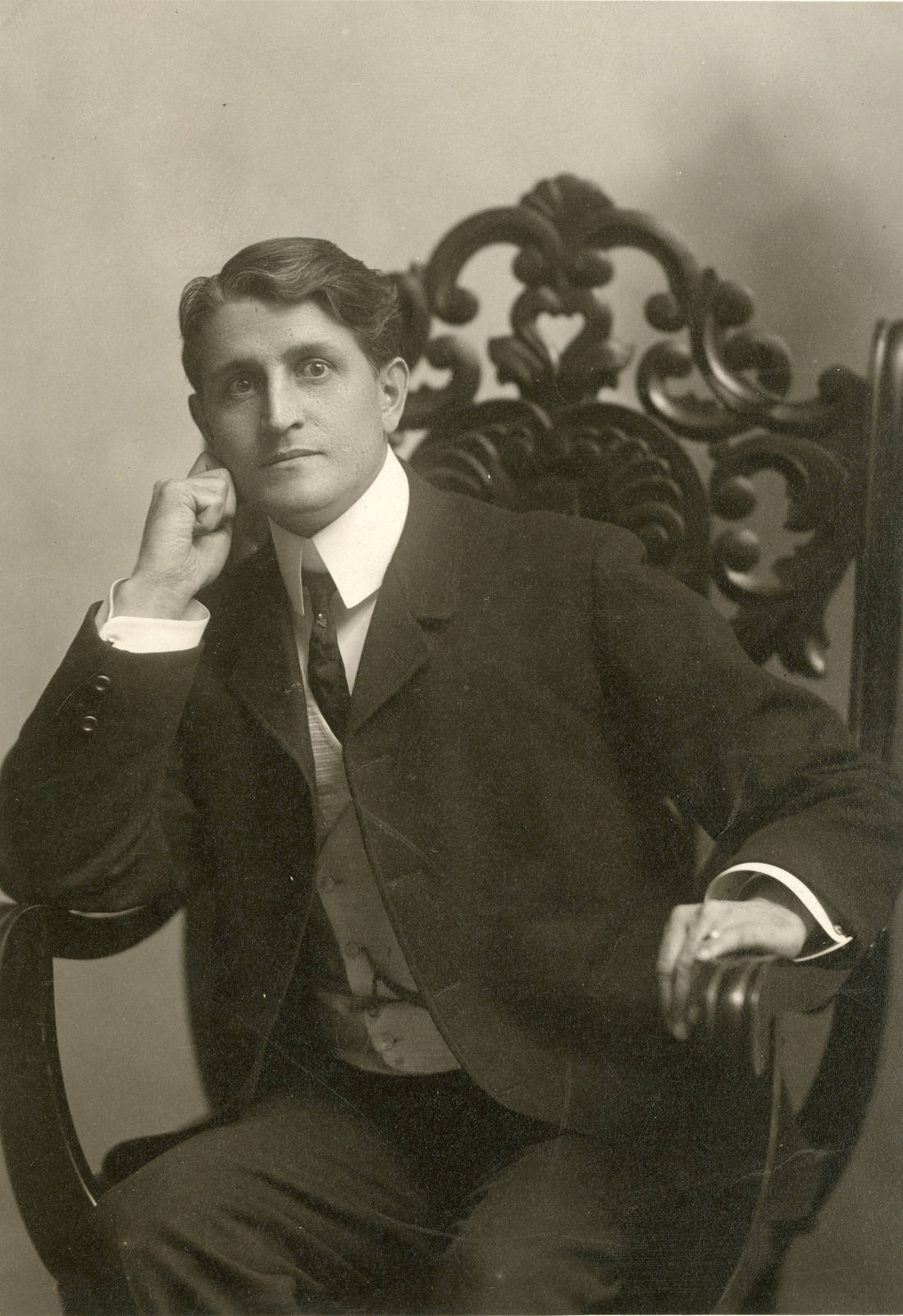
- Portrait of actor Will Corbett, 1903
- Born: 1867
- Died: Unknown
- Occupations: Stage actor, film actor
- Parent(s): Patrick H. Corbett and Ann Shields

William D. Corbett, known professionally as 'Will' Corbett, was an early American silent film and stage actor, who appeared in over a dozen silent movies from 1911 to 1929. He is best remembered by film historians and enthusiasts for his portrayal of 'Uncle Sam' in the 1920 political drama film, Uncle Sam of Freedom Ridge, directed by George Beranger.

== Early life ==
William Corbett was born in 1867 in New Britain, Connecticut, into an Irish-American family. His Father was a moldmaker and a Union veteran of the Civil War, from County Clare, Ireland. Corbett was raised in the city of New Britain, and lived there for a number of years before pursuing an acting career. He resided at the apartment of his brother Patrick as late as 1900 in that city.

== Early stage involvement ==
Corbett can be found as early as 1892 giving theatrical performances throughout the Northeast. In the fall of 1892, he gave one of his first performances in a production of the comedy, "Joshua Simpkins", at the Grand Opera House in Malone, New York. He also briefly played in acts at the Wonderland Theatre in Scranton, Pennsylvania in 1894. He was a member of the original Davis Stock Company of Scranton. The New York Clipper Annual records Corbett giving a performance of "Unto Death" on December 22, 1894 with George H. Bubb at Amesbury, Massachusetts. In 1895, Corbett was to give a performance with the same George H. Bubb as part of a traveling company, The Bubb Comedy Company, at the Saint John Opera House in New Brunswick. After disagreements among cast members, the Bubb Comedy Company was disbanded and former cast member Edward E. Nickerson arranged his own Comedy company with Corbett to return for the following season at Saint John's. That same year, Corbett played the main character in Jules Verne's play adaptation of "Michael Strogoff" at the Augusta Opera House in Augusta, Maine with Edward E. Nickerson's Company. By the late 1890s, Corbett was active in various locations outside New England, centering around New York City. He was a member of the theatre troop, Corse Payton's Stock Company of Brooklyn. Corbett was the original leading man of the company. In 1898, Corbett married fellow actress and ballerina, Camille Gautier, also a member of Payton's group. During this period, he acted in several productions including, "Woman Against Woman" by Frank Harvey, debuting at the Empire Theatre, "The White Slave" and "The Galley Slave" by Bartley Campbell, "The Parisian Princess", "The Runaway Wife" and "Flirtation", among many others. Corbett held acclaim for his roles in Harvey's play, "Woman Against Woman", which he played from 1899 to 1901 with Corse Payton's Stock Company.

After the organization of Corse Payton's own playhouse on Lee Avenue in Brooklyn in 1900, Corbett continued to headline acts at the Payton Theater. Continuing his work with Corse Payton's Stock Company, Will Corbett entered into association with the Ferris Company of Minneapolis, led by Dick Ferris, in 1902, performing in plays in various roles. During this time he appeared in the role of 'Baron Dangloss' for the premiere of Grace Hayward's play, "Graustark".

For an undetermined period of time, Corbett was also engaged in circus entertainment as a 'knockabout clown' with the Sun Bros. Circus of Atlanta, Georgia.

== Disappearance and further stage involvements ==
One of Corbett's more notable appearances was in 1906 with Wallace Erskine and Minna Phillips in a travelling production of The Duke of Killiecrankie. However, on February 23, 1906, Will Corbett was reported missing from his hotel room in Meriden, Connecticut. His disappearance put the production on hold, and cancelled a performance in Winsted that same day. The circumstances of his disappearance were unconfirmed. Following his return, Corbett appeared at The Music Hall in Portsmouth, New Hampshire to resume his leading part in the play. That same year, Corbett appeared with Alfred M. De Lisser and Ethel Hunt in a one-act play titled "The Day Before" at the Berkeley Lyceum Theatre. One year later, he participated in the opening stage production for the re-opening of the Bush Temple Theatre in Chicago. In 1909, Corbett was part of the resident company at the Sans Souci Theatre in Chicago with Virginia Harned and Wilson Melrose. He worked with Blanche Walsh that same year on "The Test".

== Film ==
Will Corbett's introduction to silent film is not known, but his first known role was in the 1911 Vitagraph short, For Love and Glory directed by Van Dyke Brooke. The film is considered lost, but Corbett's character in the original plot was the father of 'Rose Seaton', played by Helen Gardner. He appeared in Lawrence B. McGill's short Hands Across the Sea in '76 that same year, possibly cast as Benjamin Franklin. He had an unknown association with the Lubin Company also during this time. Corbett's name would become synonymous with political characters in silent film, as he would be cast as such in various motion pictures going forward.

Continuing his stage career, Corbett joined the Glaser Stock Company of Omaha, Nebraska in 1912, with fellow stage and silent film actor Richard Tucker. He would continue acting in stage productions throughout the 1910s including with Richard Buhler and 'The Popular Players' at Poli's Theatre in Washington, D.C., in the premiere of Henry Chesterfield's "A Man Without A Country" at the Palace Theatre, and in the opening of the Adams Theatre on September 1, 1917 in Detroit, Michigan.

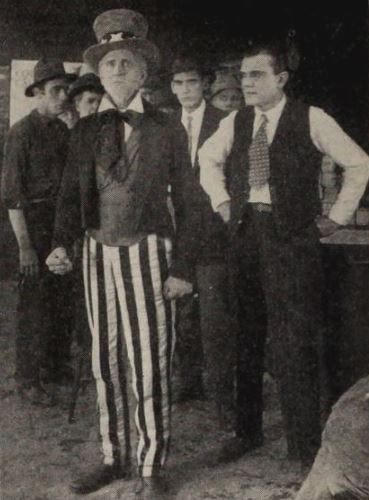
Will Corbett as 'Uncle Sam', with George MacQuarrie as postmaster in Uncle Sam of Freedom Ridge (1920)

Corbett appeared in his first feature film in 1915, Thou Shalt Not Kill, directed by Hal Reid. That same year he appeared in The Senator, directed by Joseph A. Golden, adapted from a play of the same name. Will Corbett was cast as a supporting character in the film. His first character actor role in film was as 'Julian Forbes' in Souls in Bondage, directed by Edgar Lewis.

In 1916, he collaborated with director George Ridgwell and baseball star Ty Cobb in the dramatic short, Somewhere in Georgia.

Will Corbett's most publicized role was in 1920 in the film adaptation of Margaret Prescott Montague's short story, "Uncle Sam of Freedom Ridge". This short story, first published in the Atlantic Monthly magazine, was adapted for film by Harry Levey. The film was directed by George Beranger. Corbett appeared as the title role in the film. As the patriotic and symbolic American character, Uncle Sam, he is employed in the film to promote the propaganda efforts of the League of Nations. President Woodrow Wilson and members of his cabinet were at the first screening of the film on September 26, 1920. It was shown at the Selwyn and Cohan & Harris theatres.

== Later stage career ==
Corbett continued his career as a stage actor in the early 1920s, taking a hiatus from screen acting. He appeared in a number of notable Broadway productions during this time, including in "Robert E. Lee" and a revival of "Abraham Lincoln" by John Drinkwater, "Milgrim's Progress" by Benjamin Orkow, "Not Herbert" by Howard Irving Young and a revival of "Under the Gaslight" by Augustin Daly.

He played in his first sound film in 1929, the murder mystery, Unmasked, directed by Edgar Lewis. He played the supporting character, 'Franklin Ward'. Corbett played in two other known sound films in the 1930s including in the Master Arts Products musical short, Stephen Foster, and the Twentieth Century-Fox feature, Charlie Chan at the Circus. Corbett also appeared in one known radio production with fellow Broadway cast members in January 1930 for NBC titled Heroes of the World.

His last known casting on Broadway was in January 1934 in Ronald Gow's play, John Brown, as Robert E. Lee.

== Filmography ==
- For Love and Glory (1911) as 'the Father'
- Hands Across the Sea in '76 (1911) as Benjamin Franklin (unconfirmed)
- Thou Shalt Not Kill (1915), uncredited
- What Does a Woman Need? (c. 1915)
- The Senator (1915)
- Souls in Bondage (1916), as Julian Forbes
- Somewhere in Georgia (1917)
- Uncle Sam of Freedom Ridge (1920), as Uncle Sam
- The Discarded Woman (1920), as Gorman
- The Face At Your Window (1920), as Steve Drake
- The Church With An Overshot Wheel (1920), as Josiah Rankin
- Determination (1922), uncredited
- Unmasked (1929), as Franklin Ward
- Stephen Foster (1933), as Colonel Colby
- Charlie Chan at the Circus (1936)
