= James W. Corbett =

American physicist

James William Corbett (25 August 1928, Manhattan – 25 April 1994, Albany, New York) was a solid-state physicist.

He received his bachelor's degree from the University of Missouri and his Ph.D. from Yale University in 1955. Beginning in 1955 he was a research associate at the General Electric Research Laboratory in Schenectady, New York. During the 1960s as an adjunct professor at Rensselaer Polytechnic Institute, he was a co-founder and director of Rensselaer's Joint Laboratories for Advanced Materials. His 1966 book Electron Radiation Damage in Semiconductors and Metals was highly esteemed. In 1968 he joined the faculty of the University at Albany, SUNY. For the academic year 1975–1976 he was a Guggenheim Fellow. He was an associate editor of the Elsevier journal Materials Letters.

Dr. Corbett earned an international reputation for his contributions to semiconductor physics. He was the author or co-author of hundreds of publications, including 10 books and monographs, the most recent of which, "Hydrogen in Crystalline Semiconductors," was published by Springer Verlag in 1992.

At G.E. his research involved early pioneering studies of the effects of electron irradiation on metals and semiconductors.

As his career progressed, Corbett expanded his research efforts to include defects resulting from neutron irradiation, ion-implant damage and various aspects of semiconductor processing. With his students and collaborators he also made innovative use of probes such as deep-level transient spectroscopy, positron annihilation and quantum mechanical cluster calculations to push forward research into the basic nature of defects. Of particular importance have been his contributions to the understanding of the variety of vacancy aggregates that can form in silicon, the properties of hydrogen and the myriad technologically important interactions that can and do occur between them.

Upon his death, he was survived by his wife, M. E. Grenander, and two sons. In 1999 a bequest of $1.5 million from M. E. Grenander funded the James W. Corbett Distinguished Professorship in Physics at the University at Albany, SUNY.
