= Michael Corbett =

ob unsourced = removed per WP:BLPMichael Corbett may refer to:

- Mike Corbett (ice hockey, born 1942) (1942–2003), ice hockey player in the National Hockey League
- Mike Corbett (ice hockey, born 1972), men's hockey head coach
- Mike Corbett (Power Rangers), fictional character from Power Rangers
- Michael Corbett (judge) (1923–2007), Chief Justice of South Africa
- Michael Corbett (actor), played David Kimble on The Young and the Restless from 1986 to 1991
- Michael Corbett (spree killer), murderer of Kelsey Grammer's sister
