= Harry Corbett (footballer) =

Australian rules footballer

Personal information
- Full name: Harry Corbett
- Born: 10 April 1943
- Original team: Ivanhoe
- Height: 189 cm (6 ft 2 in)
- Weight: 87 kg (192 lb)

Playing career^{1}
Years	Club	Games (Goals)
1966–67	Fitzroy	10 (2)
- ^{1} Playing statistics correct to the end of 1967.

Harry Corbett (born 10 April 1943) is a former Australian rules footballer who played with Fitzroy in the Victorian Football League (VFL).
