= Children of the Nations =

Nonprofit organization

Children of the Nations International
- Founded: 1995
- Founder: Chris and Debbie Clark
- Type: Non-Governmental Organization
- Purpose: To provide holistic, Christ-centered care for orphaned and destitute children, enabling them to create positive and lasting change in their nations.
- Location: Silverdale, Washington, U.S. (International Headquarters)
- Region served: 5 countries: Dominican Republic, Malawi, Sierra Leone, Uganda, Haiti
- Revenue: USD $8.47 million (2016)
- Website: www.cotni.org

Children of the Nations (COTN) is a Christian nonprofit organization that exists to provide care for orphaned and destitute children in poverty-stricken areas of the world. Operating in Malawi, Sierra Leone, the Dominican Republic, Uganda, and Haiti, COTN helps nearly 7,000 children on a daily basis. COTN's stated goal is to "Raise children who transform nations."

Children of the Nations is a Christian nonprofit organization headquartered in Silverdale, Washington, US.

== History ==
Children of the Nations (COTN) was founded in 1995 by Chris Clark, a fifth-generation missionary raised in Africa, and his wife, Debbie Clark. On assignment in Sierra Leone, Chris and Debbie encountered orphans and refugee children in dire need of assistance and started COTN with the desire to meet the needs of those children.

Today, COTN is operating in Sierra Leone, Malawi, Uganda, Dominican Republic, and Haiti to provide holistic care for orphaned and destitute children.

== Organizational structure ==
Children of the Nations International operates as a non-governmental organization (NGO) within the United States with its headquarters in Silverdale, Washington. COTN also operates regional offices in Seattle, Washington; Orlando, Florida; and Orange County, California.

Each COTN country office is set up as its own NGO with a local board of directors overseeing operations within that country.

== Operations ==
COTN's main area of focus is providing care for the most desperate children in each of the geographic areas where the organization serves. They do this through a two-pronged approach, by providing full-time care for orphaned children and by partnering with communities to care for orphaned and destitute children living with caregivers who are unable to provide for them. All children enrolled in COTN's programs receive food, education, medical care, and mentoring, depending on their specific needs.

COTN's main goal is to raise these children to become future leaders of their communities. This is accomplished through child sponsorship as well as the donation of funds, resources, and volunteer work related to the construction of children's homes, schools, medical clinics, vocational skills centers, farms, and feeding centers. This assistance is intended to lead to self-sustainability, not dependence.

The organization also puts a large emphasis on short-term mission trips in the countries where it serves. More than 400 individuals traveled overseas with COTN in 2016.

== Ratings ==
Children of the Nations currently holds a four-star rating (the highest possible rating) from Charity Navigator, and is accredited by the Evangelical Council for Financial Accountability (ECFA).
