= Willie Corbett =

Scottish footballer (1922–2011)

Personal information
- Full name: William Risk Corbett
- Date of birth: 31 August 1922
- Place of birth: Falkirk, Scotland
- Date of death: 31 July 2011 (aged 88)
- Place of death: Bonnybridge, Scotland
- Position: Centre half

Youth career
- Dunipace Thistle
- 1940–1941: Maryhill

Senior career*
Years	Team	Apps	(Gls)
1941–1948	Celtic	48	(3)
1948–1949	Preston North End	19	(0)
1949–1950	Leicester City	16	(0)
1950–1951	Yeovil Town		
1951–1952	Dunfermline Athletic	19	(0)
1952–1953	Greenock Morton	11	(0)
Total		113	(3)

International career
1942	Scotland (wartime)	1	(0)
- * Club domestic league appearances and goals

William Risk Corbett (31 August 1922 – 31 July 2011) was a Scottish footballer who played as a centre-half.

Corbett made 60 official appearances for Celtic from 1946 to 1948 (having joined in 1941 during wartime) and also played for Preston North End, Leicester City, Yeovil Town, Dunfermline Athletic and Greenock Morton. He also appeared as a guest player for West Ham United in World War II.

His two brothers, David and Norman, were also footballers.
