= Borrowdale, Westmorland =

Valley in England

Coordinates: 54.42°N 2.665°W

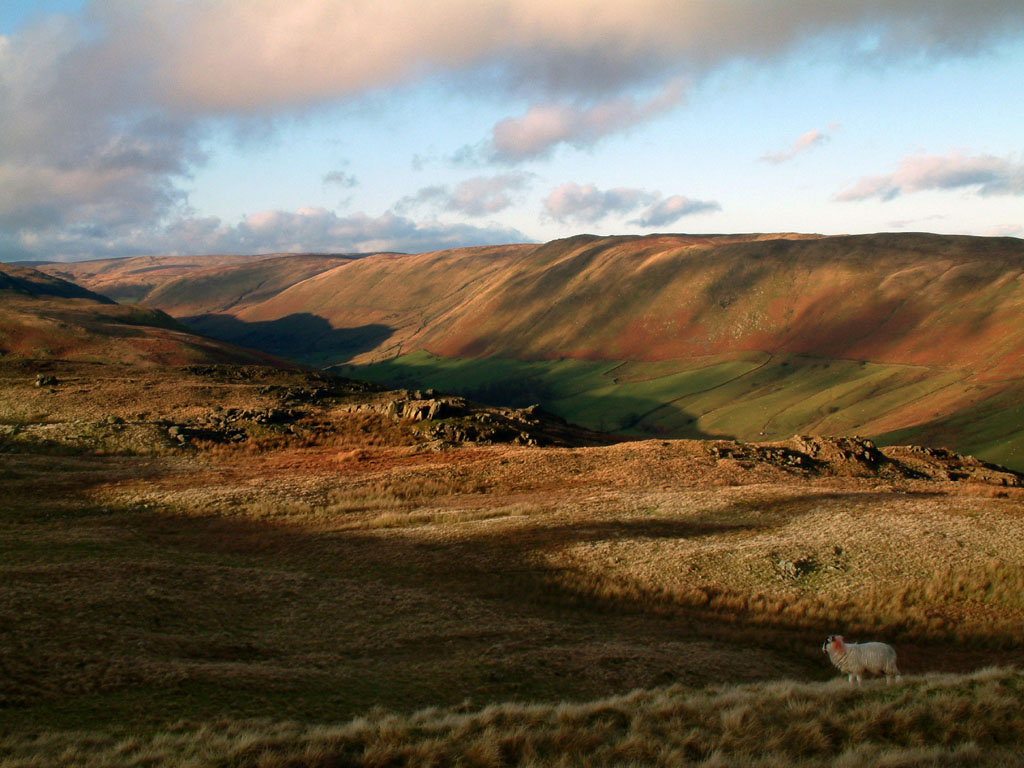
Borrowdale (Westmorland) from the slopes of Grayrigg Forest

Borrowdale is a valley in the English Lake District. It is located in the historic county of Westmorland, and is sometimes referred to as Westmorland Borrowdale in order to distinguish it from another Borrowdale located in Cumberland.

The valley straddles the eastern border of the Lake District National Park, and is within the unitary authority area of Westmorland and Furness.

The valley carries Borrow Beck for 11 kilometres (6.8 mi), from Borrowdale Hole, through Borrowdale Moss to End of Borrowdale, crossing the A6 road at High Borrow Bridge and reaching the River Lune at Low Borrow Bridge, the site of a Roman fort. The original bridge has been supplemented by a new structure carrying the A685 road. The location also contains viaducts carrying the M6 motorway and the West Coast Main Line railway.

The upper segment, above High Borrow Bridge, is very remote; the lower segment carries a bridleway along its length, and has easy parking at the eastern end just off the A685, but remains quiet even in the high season.
