= Creature of the night =

Creature(s) of the night may refer to:

- Creatures of the Night, a 1982 album by the rock band Kiss
  - "Creatures of the Night" (Kiss song), a 1982 song from that album
- "Creatures of the Night" (Hardwell and Austin Mahone song), 2017
- "Touch-a, Touch-a, Touch-a Touch Me", a song from The Rocky Horror Picture Show (alternate name, derived from the refrain)
- "No Tears (For The Creatures of The Night)", a 1978 song from Tuxedomoon
- Creatures of the Night (film), a 1934 Italian drama film
- Creatures of the Night (book), by Sal Piro, on the subject of The Rocky Horror Picture Show
- Creatures of the Night (comics), by Neil Gaiman and Michael Zulli
- Any nocturnal animal
- Creature of the Night (novel), a 2005 fantasy novel by Kate Thompson
- Vampire, mythological creatures who subsist by feeding on the blood of the living
- Night owl (person), a person who tends to stay up very late into the night
- (I'll Never Be) Maria Magdalena, a 1985 song by West German singer Sandra Cretu (by a prominent attribution from the refrain)
- "Creatures of the Night" (CSI: NY episode), a 2004 television program
