= Materials Letters =

- Discipline: Materials science, Materials, Synthesis
- Language: English
- Edited by: Raymundo Arróyave

Publication details
- History: 1982-present
- Publisher: Elsevier (Netherlands)
- Impact factor: 2.7 (2023)

Standard abbreviations
- ISO 4: Mater. Lett.

Indexing
- ISSN: 0167-577X

Links
- Journal homepage; Online access

Materials Letters is an interdisciplinary, peer-reviewed journal published by Elsevier which according to its website "is dedicated to publishing novel, cutting edge reports of broad interest to the materials community."

== Abstracting and indexing ==
The journal is abstracted and indexed in:

- Scopus
- Science Citation Index Expanded

According to the Journal Citation Reports, the journal has a 2023 impact factor of 2.7.
