= Corbeau =

Corbeau may refer to:

- Le Corbeau - (French for: The Raven), a 1943 French language film
- Corbeau (grape), another name for the French wine grape Douce noir
- American black vulture - or black vulture, Coragyps atratus
- Corbeau (band), Canadian rock band
- Belgian beer glassware of 1 litre
- A brand of aftermarket seating for motor vehicles
- A name for a turkey vulture or black vulture (large carrion-feeding birds of prey with turkey-like bald red or black heads) in Trinidad and Tobago
