= John Rooke Corbett =

British rock climber

J. Rooke Corbett
- Born: 27 September 1876; Handforth, Cheshire, England
- Died: 13 August 1949 (aged 72)

John Rooke Corbett (27 September 1876 – 13 August 1949), better known as J. Rooke Corbett was one of the founder-members of The Rucksack Club and their Convener of Rambles. In the 1920s Corbett compiled a list of Scottish hills between 2,500 and 3,000 feet (762.0 and 914.4 metres) with a prominence of at least 500 feet (152.4 metres). It was not published until after his death, when his sister passed it to the Scottish Mountaineering Club; these hills are now well known to Scottish hillwalkers as the Corbetts.

== Early life ==
Rooke Corbett attended both Hulme and Manchester Grammar Schools. While attending St John's College, Cambridge from 1895 to 1898, he walked from Manchester to Cambridge at the beginning of term, and back again at the end.

== Climbing ==
He was the fourth person to complete the Munros in 1930 and the first Englishman to do so. He was also the second to complete the "Tops".
