= Cnoc an Chuillinn =

Mountain in Kerry, Ireland

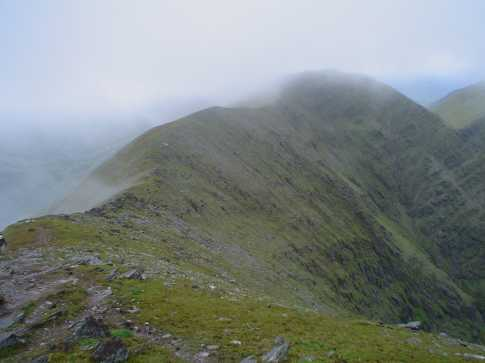
- Ridge and summit of Cnoc an Chuillinn East Top (near), and Cnoc an Chuillinn (far), as seen looking westwards from Maolan Bui

Highest point
- Elevation: 958 m (3,143 ft)
- Prominence: 53 m (174 ft)
- Listing: Furth, Hewitt, Arderin, Simm, Vandeleur-Lynam
- Coordinates: 51°59′24″N 9°42′49″W

Geography
- Location within island of Ireland
- Location: County Kerry, Ireland
- Parent range: MacGillycuddy's Reeks
- OSI/OSNI grid: V823833
- Topo map: OSI Discovery 78

Geology
- Mountain type(s): Purple sandstone & siltstone Bedrock

Cnoc an Chuillinn (Irish for "hill of the steep slope"), at 958 metres (3,143 ft), is the sixth-highest peak in Ireland on the Arderin list and the seventh-highest peak in Ireland on the Vandeleur-Lynam list. The name is sometimes incorrectly anglicised to Knockacullion, which is a name used for peaks and townlands in other parts of Ireland. Cnoc an Chuillinn is part of the MacGillycuddy's Reeks range in County Kerry.

== Geography ==
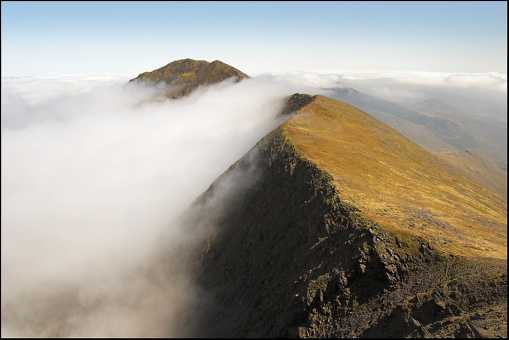
Photograph taken from the summit of Cnoc an Chuillinn, with Maolan Bui in distance, and Cnoc an Chuillinn East Top visible in the foreground

Cnoc an Chuillinn lies in the eastern section of the MacGillycuddy's Reeks, Ireland's highest mountain range. It is at the start of a high ridge section that, moving eastwards, includes Cnoc an Chuillinn East Top (926 m or 3,038 ft) (a subsidiary summit of Cnoc an Chuillinn, but which is itself a Vandeleur-Lynam), Maolán Buí (973 m or 3,192 ft), Cnoc na Péiste (988 m or 3,241 ft), The Big Gun (939 m or 3,081 ft) and finishes with Cruach Mhór (932 m or 3,058 ft).

Between Cnoc an Chuillinn, and Cnoc an Chuillinn East Top, lies a major south-east spur to the less frequently climbed, Brassel Mountain (575 m or 1,886 ft), which descends steeply into the Black Valley below. Brassel Mountain is regarded for its steep scrambling, and as an alternative access route to the eastern section of the main Reek's ridge, from more frequently used Hag's Glen options.

To the west of Cnoc an Chiullinn is Cnoc na Toinne (845 m or 2,772 ft), and then the drop down to the col from which the Devil's Ladder can be descended into the Hag's Glen.

Cnoc an Chuillinn's name is often misspelt, including swapping the middle-"an" for "na", or using one "l" or one "n", or using the anglicised term of Knockacullion, as done in other parts of Ireland.

Cnoc an Chuillinn is the 316th-highest mountain in Britain and Ireland on the Simm classification. It is listed by the Scottish Mountaineering Club ("SMC") as one of 34 Furths, which is a mountain above 3,000 ft (914.4 m) in elevation, and meets the other SMC criteria for a Munro (e.g. "sufficient separation"), but which is outside of (or furth) Scotland; which is why Cnoc an Chuillinn is sometimes referred to as one of the 13 Irish Munros.

Cnoc an Chuillinn's prominence qualifies it to meet the Arderin classification, and the British Isles Simm and Hewitt classifications. Cnoc an Chuillinn does not appear in the MountainViews Online Database, 100 Highest Irish Mountains, as the prominence threshold is over 100 m (328 ft 1 in).

== See also ==
- Lists of mountains in Ireland
- List of mountains of the British Isles by height
- List of Furth mountains in the British Isles
