= Cnoc na Toinne =

Mountain in Kerry, Ireland

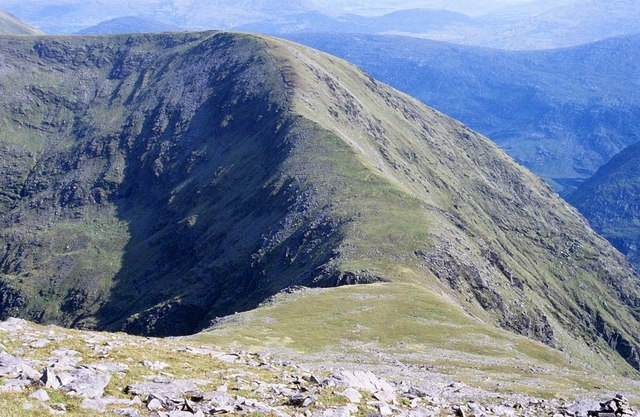
- Devil's Ladder col as seen from Carrauntoohil, with the summit ridge to Cnoc na Toinne behind

Highest point
- Elevation: 845 m (2,772 ft)
- Prominence: 80 m (260 ft)
- Listing: Hewitt, Arderin, Simm, Vandeleur-Lynam
- Coordinates: 51°59′26″N 9°43′53″W

Geography
- Location within island of Ireland
- Location: County Kerry, Ireland
- Parent range: MacGillycuddy's Reeks
- OSI/OSNI grid: V811834
- Topo map: OSI Discovery 78

Geology
- Mountain type(s): Well-bedded grey sandstone, (Lough Acoose Sandstone Formation)

Climbing
- Easiest route: Devil's Ladder (via Hag's Glen)

Cnoc na Toinne (Irish for "hill of the wave"), (Note: Paul Tempan in Irish Hills and Mountain Names notes that it has also been called Irish: An Caisleán Gael, meaning 'the bright castle'.) at 845 metres (2,772 ft), is the 17th-highest peak in Ireland on the Arderin list, and the 23rd-highest peak in Ireland on the Vandeleur-Lynam list. It is part of the MacGillycuddy's Reeks range in County Kerry. Cnoc na Toinne lies between the Coomloughra Reeks and the Eastern Reeks, and is just above the col of the Devil's Ladder, a popular route for climbing Carrauntoohil, Ireland's highest mountain.

== Geography ==
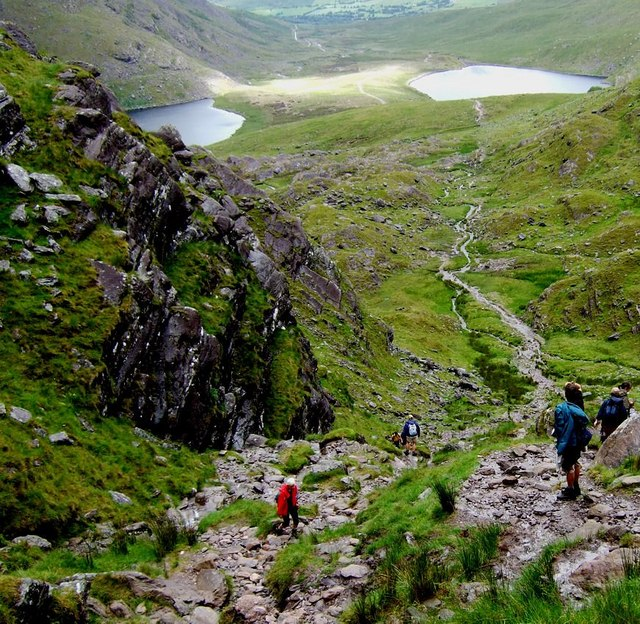
Looking down the Devil's Ladder path from the top of the col between Cnoc na Toinne and Carrauntoohil.

Cnoc na Toinne is most frequently encountered as the minor summit that forms the col with Carrauntoohil, through which most hill walkers travel on their way summiting Ireland's highest mountain. The col is most commonly accessed from the Hag's Glen (via Cronin's Yard), by ascending a loose rocky path known as the Devil's Ladder (see photo opposite). (Note: It is not clear whether the term Devil's Ladder is linked to the Irish proverb: "Go ndeine an diabhal dréimire de cnámh do dhroma ag piocadh úll i ngairdín Ifrinn." (May the devil make a ladder of your backbone [and] pluck apples in the garden of hell).)

Because of the deterioration of the Devil's Ladder path, hill walkers also use the Zig-Zag path on the northern side of the north-west spur of Cnoc na Toinne, known as Bóthar na Gíge, as an alternative route. This path brings walkers closer to the actual summit of Cnoc na Toinne.

Cnoc na Toinne lies between the Coomloughra Reeks and the Eastern Reeks and effectively separates the two main sections of the MacGillycuddy Reeks range, each section containing half of the Reeks summits that are above 3,000 ft in height. The north-easterly ridge that rises up from the top of the Devil's Ladder col to Cnoc na Toinne, then rises further to neighbouring Cnoc an Chuillinn 958 metres (3,143 ft), where is runs in a straight north-easterly direction, taking in several major summits, connected by a high sharp ridge, before ending at Cruach Mhór 932 metres (3,058 ft).

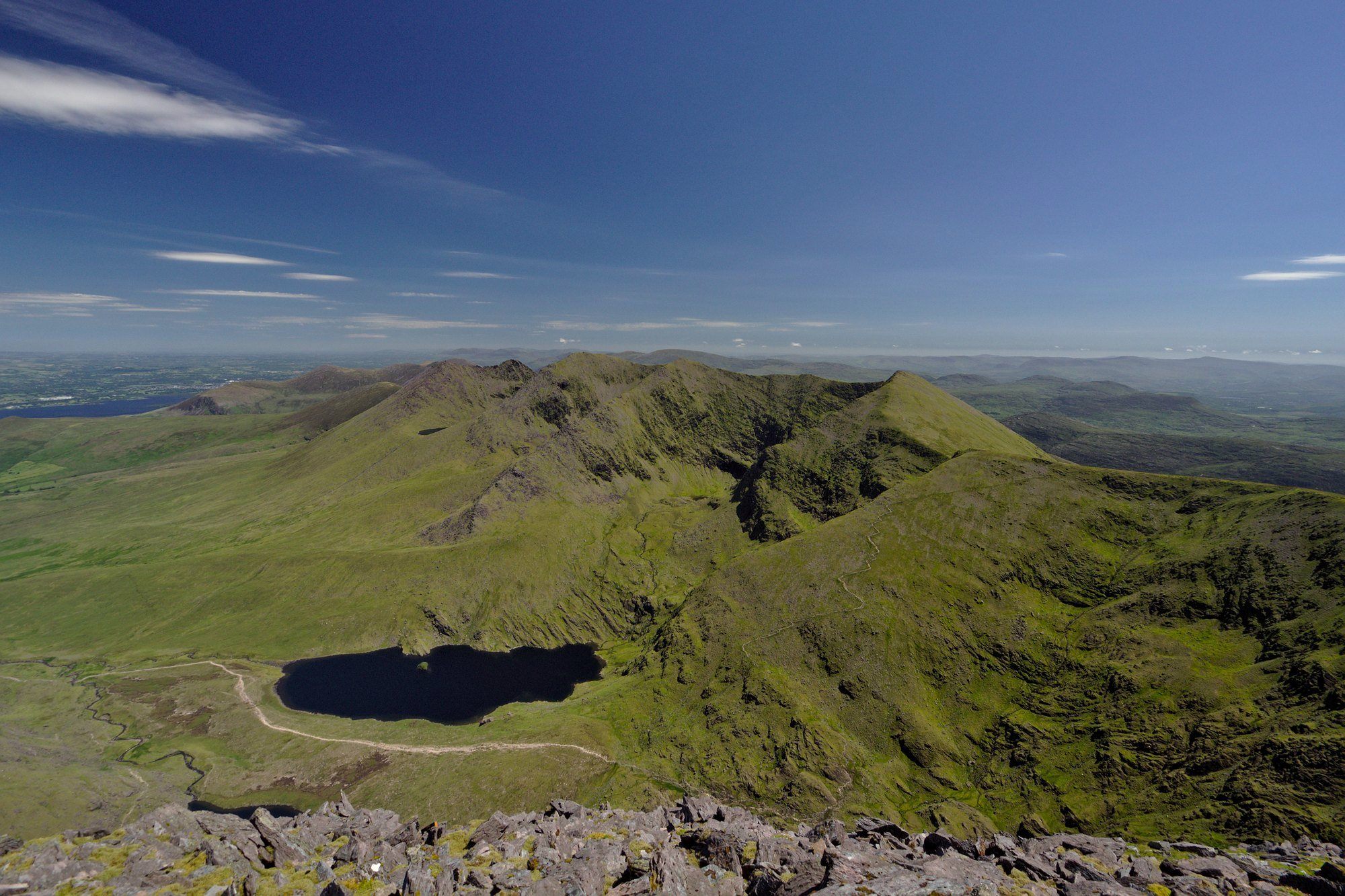
Eastern Reeks section as seen from Carrauntoohil. The large green ridge in the right foreground is Cnoc na Toinne, and the Zig-Zag path is near its left edge

Cnoc na Toinne is the 798th-highest mountain in Britain and Ireland on the Simm classification. Cnoc na Toinne's prominence qualifies it to meet the Arderin classification, and the British Isles Simm and Hewitt classifications. Cnoc na Toinne does not appear in the MountainViews Online Database, 100 Highest Irish Mountains, as the prominence threshold is over 100 m (328 ft).

== See also ==
- Lists of mountains in Ireland
- List of mountains of the British Isles by height
- List of Furth mountains in the British Isles
