= MacGillycuddy's Reeks =

Mountain range in Kerry, Ireland

- Irish: Na Cruacha Dubha
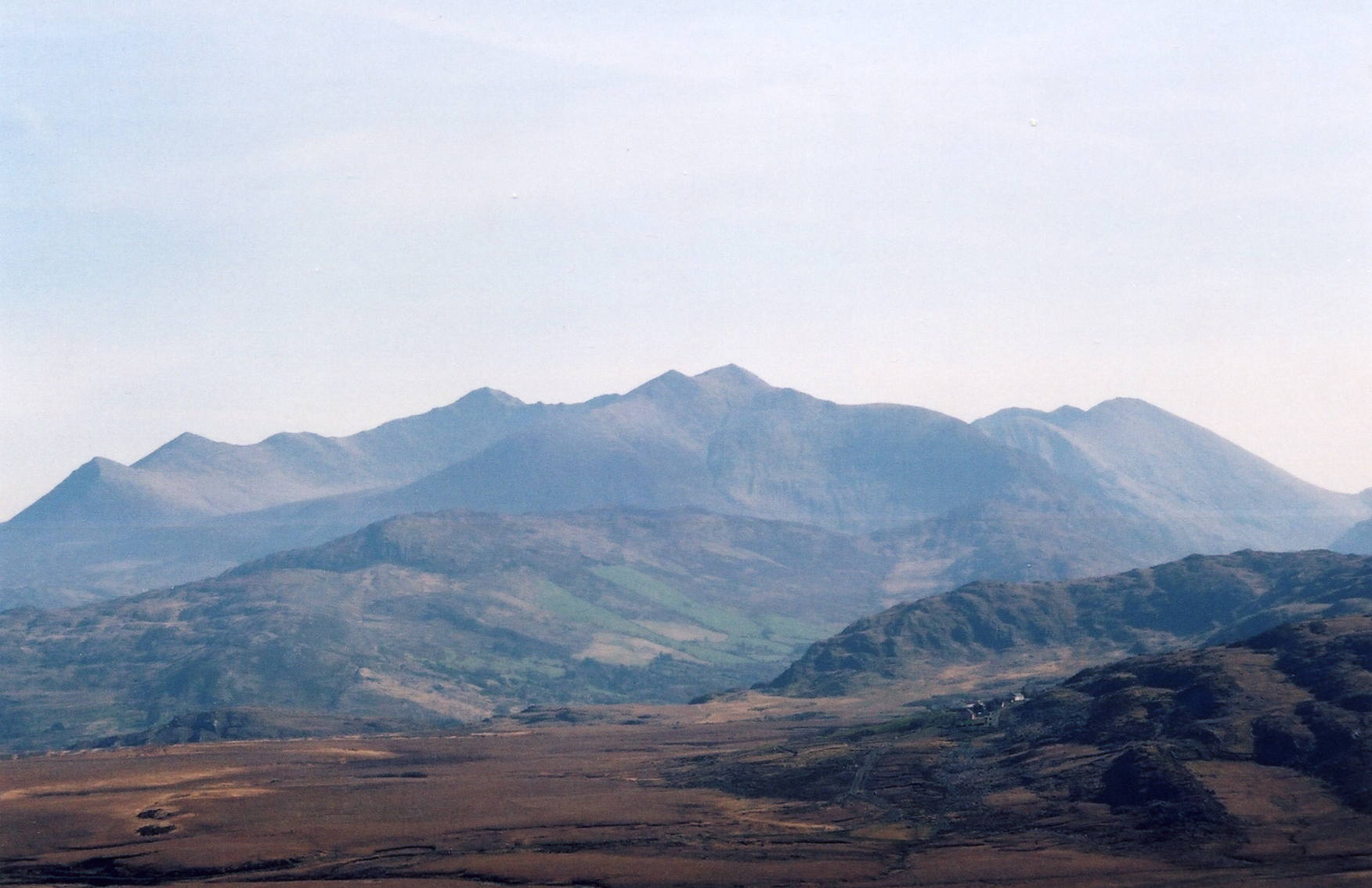

Highest point
- Peak: Carrauntoohil
- Elevation: 1,038.6 m (3,407 ft)
- Coordinates: 52.01°N 9.70°W

Dimensions
- Length: 19 km (12 mi) East–West

Naming
- English translation: the black stacks
- Language of name: Irish

Geography
- Location within island of Ireland
- Location: County Kerry
- Country: Ireland
- Provinces of Ireland: Munster
- Topo map: OSI Discovery 78

Geology
- Rock age: Devonian
- Mountain type(s): Purple sandstone & siltstone

MacGillycuddy's Reeks (Irish: Na Cruacha Dubha, meaning 'the black stacks') is a sandstone and siltstone mountain range in the Iveragh Peninsula in County Kerry, Ireland. Stretching 19 kilometres (12 miles), from the Gap of Dunloe in the east, to Glencar in the west, the Reeks is Ireland's highest mountain range, and includes most of the highest peaks and sharpest ridges in Ireland, and the only peaks on the island over 1,000 metres (3,300 feet) in height.

Near the centre of the range is Carrauntoohil, Ireland's highest mountain at 1,038.6 metres (3,407 ft). The range was heavily glaciated which carved out deep corries (e.g. the Eagle's Nest), U-shaped valleys (e.g. Lough Coomloughra), and sharp arêtes and ridges (e.g. the Beenkeragh Ridge).

The range, part of the Reeks District, is a destination for mountain walkers and climbers and includes some of Ireland's most regarded walking routes such as the 15–kilometre (10 mile) Coomloughra Horseshoe, and the 26-kilometre (16 mile) MacGillycuddy's Reeks Ridge Walk that traverses the full range; it is estimated that over 140,000 people visit the range each year. The entire range is in private ownership; however, reasonable access is given for recreational use.

== Geology ==
MacGillycuddy's Reeks are composed of sandstone particles of various sizes, which are collectively known as the Old Red Sandstone. The rocks date from the Upper Devonian period (310–450 million years ago) when Ireland was in a hot equatorial setting. During this 60 million year period, Ireland was the site of a major basin, known as the Munster basin, and the counties of Cork and Kerry were effectively a large alluvial floodplain. Chemical oxidation stained the material with a purple–reddish colour (and green in places from chlorination), still visible today. There are virtually no fossils in Old Red Sandstone. The composition of Old Red Sandstone is variable and contains quartz stones, mudstones, siltstones, and sandstone particles (boulders of conglomerate rock containing quartz pebbles are visible throughout the range). The Reeks were also subject to significant glaciation which led to fracturing of the rock, and resulted in deep corries (e.g. the Eagle's Nest), U-shaped valleys (e.g. Lough Coomloughra), and sharp arêtes and ridges (e.g. the Beenkeragh Ridge).

== Geography ==
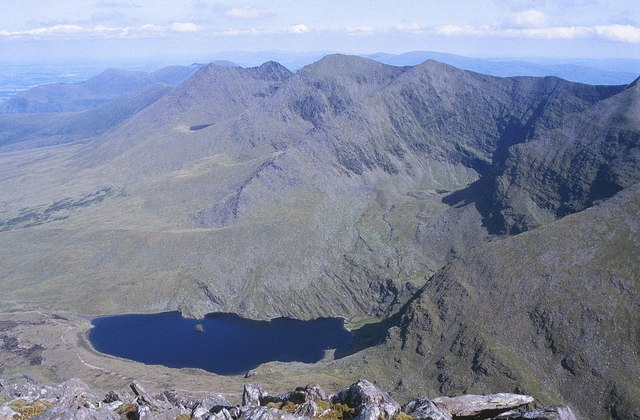
View from Carrauntoohil of the eastern section of the Reeks showing (l-to-r) Cruach Mhor, The Big Gun, Cnoc na Peiste and Maolán Buí; including Maolán Buí's large narrow north-west spur, The Bone.

MacGillycuddy's Reeks are variously described as consisting of two main sections, containing all ten of the Reeks that are above 3,000 ft:

1. Eastern Reeks, a high ridge connecting (west to east), Cnoc an Chuillinn, Maolán Buí, Cnoc na Péiste, The Big Gun, and Cruach Mhór; and
2. Coomloughra Reeks, a horseshoe around Lough Coomloughra that connects, Caher (West Top), Caher, Carrauntoohil, The Bones, and Beenkeragh.

The Eastern Reeks meet the Coomloughea Reeks at the col of the Devil's Ladder, a popular ascent route for Carrauntoohil.

MacGillycuddy's Reeks contains the three peaks in Ireland which are over 1,000 metres (3,300 feet) in height, namely: Carrauntoohil, Ireland's highest mountain at 1,038.6 m (3,407 ft), followed by Beenkeragh at 1,008 m (3,307 ft) and Caher at 1,000 m (3,300 ft).

The range contains eleven of the fourteen peaks in Ireland that are over 3,000 ft (910 m) in height, and meet the Vandeleur-Lynam classification of a mountain—peaks with a prominence over 15 m (49 ft). All but one of these eleven 3,000 ft peaks, namely Cnoc an Chuillinn East Top, are amongst the list of thirteen Irish Furths—peaks which meet the Scottish Mountaineering Club's criteria for a Munro, and they are therefore also known as Irish Munros.

There are 29 peaks in the range above 100 m (330 ft) in height. The range contains 14 Irish Hewitts (height above 2,000 ft and prominence above 30 metres; 100 feet), and 16 Irish Arderins (height above 500 metres; 2000 feet and prominence above 30 metres; 100 feet). The range is also known for its sharp aretes, including The Bones arete, more famously known as the Beenkeragh Ridge, and The Big Gun arete.

A feature of the range is the modest topographic prominence, or "drop" between many of its peaks. Only two of the eleven Reeks over 3,000 ft meet the Marilyn classification of a mountain (a prominence above 150 metres; 500 feet), namely Carrauntoohil and Cnoc na Péiste. The only Reek that meets the P600 classification (a prominence above 600 metres; 2000 feet), is Carrauntoohil itself. The combination of high peaks and low prominence, means the ridges between the peaks are at a sustained height (e.g. why the prominence is so modest), which has contributed to the popularity of ridge walking in the Reeks, particularly, the Coomloughra Horseshoe, and the MacGillycuddy's Reeks Ridge Walk, and the term, "Ireland's highest mountain range".

== Ownership ==
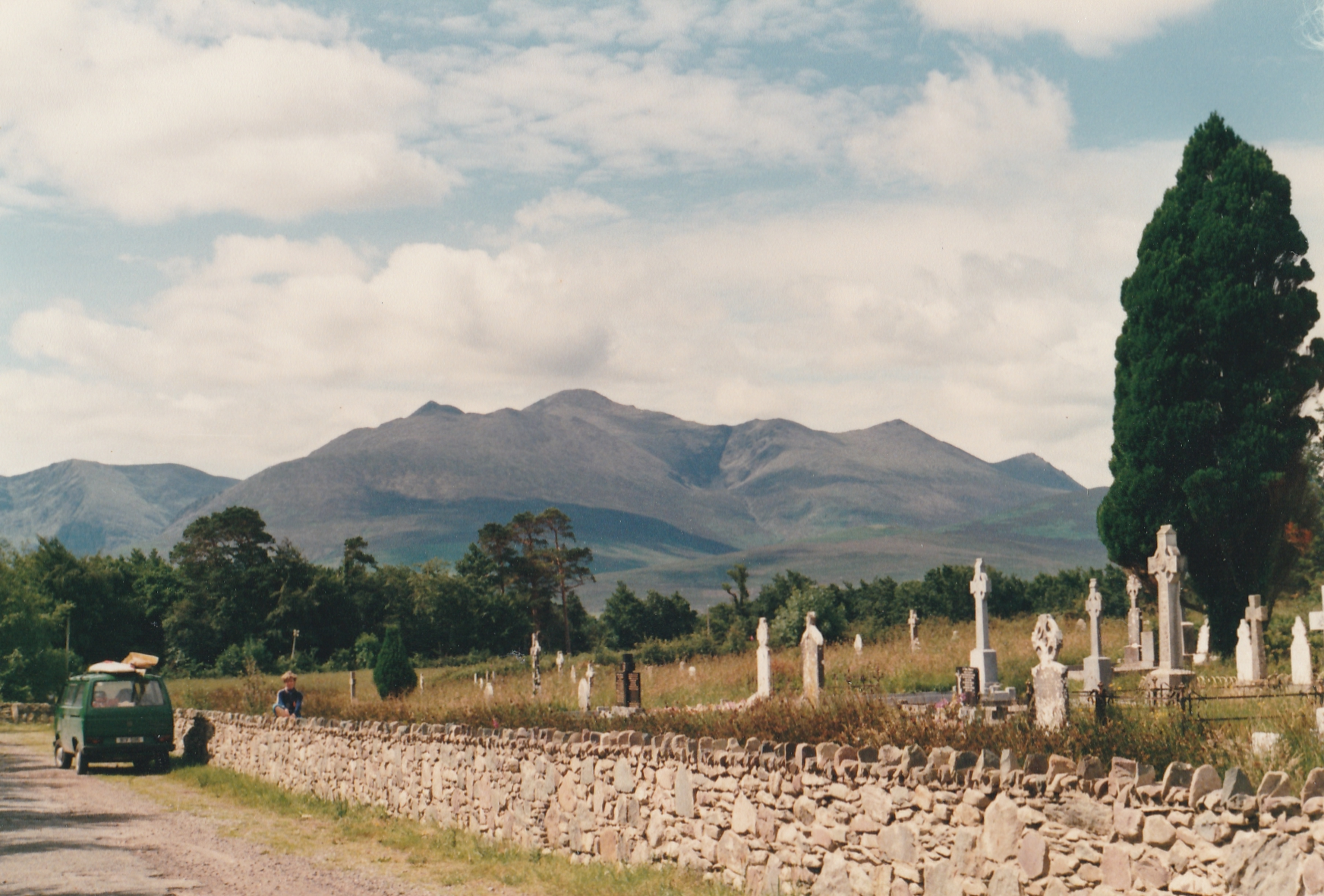
The Reeks as viewed from Churchtown Cemetery, near Beaufort, in 1990

The entire range is held in private ownership, both in individually owned freehold parcels in the lower reaches and in commonly owned, open upland zones ('commonage'). A State-sponsored report into access for the range in December 2013 titled MacGillycuddy Reeks Mountain Access Development Assessment (also called the Mountain Access Project, or MAP), mapped the complex network of land titles. Unlike many other national mountain ranges, the MacGillycuddy's Reeks are not part of a national park or a trust structure.

The private ownership has led to issues around the upkeep of popular paths in the Reeks, most particularly the erosion of the Devil's Ladder path, which is used to summit Carrauntoohil; and various car-parks and bridges used by climbers. The 2013 MAP report noted the importance of safety in light of the increasing climbers and walkers to the Reeks. The MAP report stated that Kerry Mountain Rescue ("KMR") logged 17 fatalities on the Reeks between 1966 and 2000, or about one every second year, but since 2000, KMR had been logging approximately 2 fatalities per annum.

In 2019 the Irish Times reported that the MacGillycuddy Reeks Mountain Access Forum, a cross-body group of landowners, commercial users and public access and walking groups set up in 2014 with the aim of "protecting, managing and sustainably developing the MacGillycuddy's Reeks mountain range, while halting and reversing the obvious and worsening path erosion", had achieved some success laying down new pathways in the Hag's Glen approach to Carrauntoohil; however, the Irish Times still wondered, "Should the Kerry reeks be a national park?".

== Naming ==
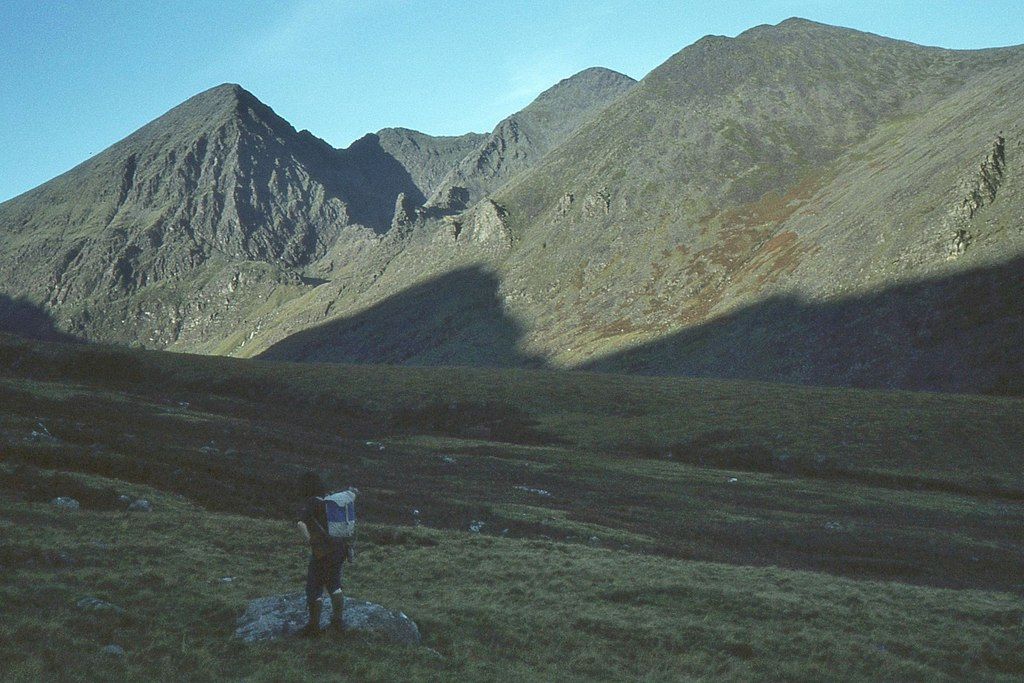
Looking into the deep Eagle's Nest corrie from the Hag's Glen. The Nest is surrounded by Carrauntoohil (left), The Bones (back, centre), and Beenkeragh (right); Knockbrinea is at the far right. The Hag's Tooth is visible at the entrance to the corrie, as is the Hag's Tooth Ridge up to the summit of Beenkeragh.

The full name of the range in Irish is Cruacha Dubha Mhic Giolla Mo Chuda, meaning "the black stacks of McGillycuddy". This is commonly shortened to Na Cruacha Dubha. The name is translated into English as "MacGillycuddy's Reeks", where reek is a Hiberno-English form of the word rick, denoting a stack.

The MacGillycuddys (Irish: Mhic Giolla Mo Chuda) were a sept, or branch, of the O'Sullivan Moore clan. The MacGillycuddy is recorded as being one of a smaller number of Gaelic chieftains whose lands were returned post the Cromwellian confiscations, which explains why the name survives to this day. The MacGillycuddy family tomb is at Kilgobnet, County Kerry, between the mountains and Killorglin. The clan chief, McGillycuddy of the Reeks, owned land in this part of Munster until the end of the 20th century.

== Recreation ==
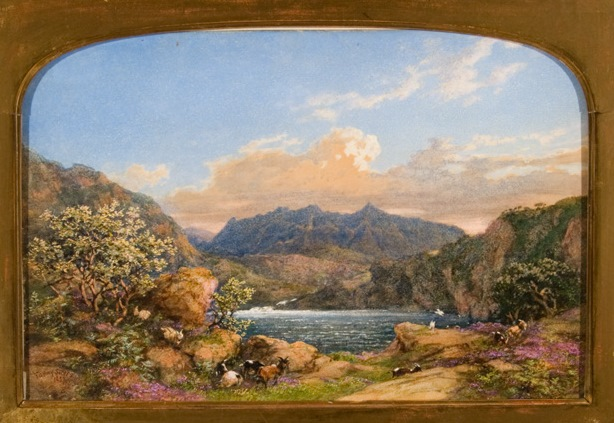
1857 painting by Fanny Steers and bought by Henry Wadsworth Longfellow. It remains on display in the Longfellow House in Cambridge, Massachusetts.

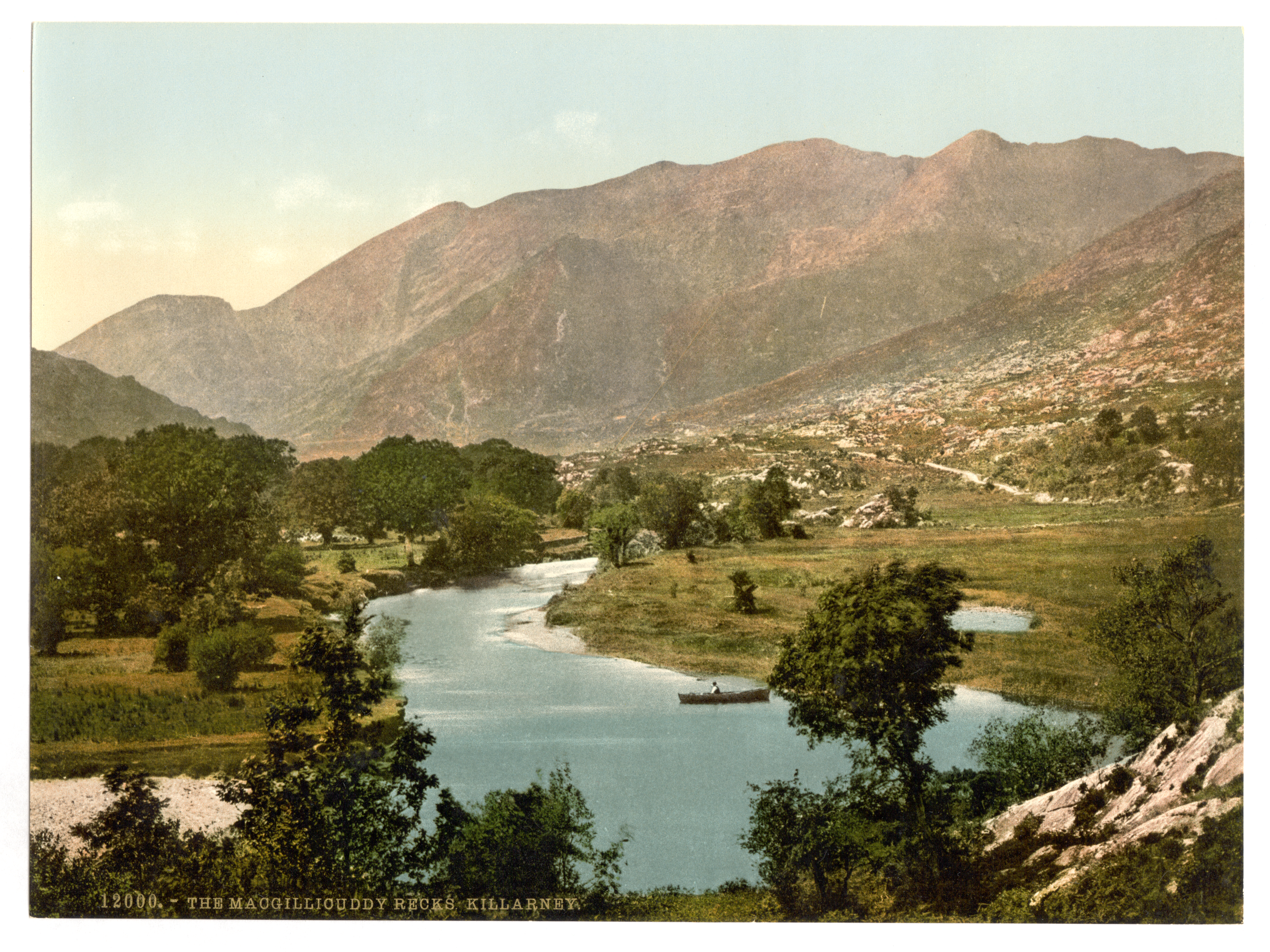
Photochrome print created around 1900 for sale as a souvenir

=== Visitors ===
Jim Ryan's 2006 book on the Reeks, Carrauntoohil and MacGillycuddy's Reeks: A Walking Guide to Ireland's Highest Mountains, stated that there were 25,000 annual visitors to the Reeks. The 2013 MAP report quoted Ryan's figures, which were cited in the MAP's Terms of Reference, but stated that: "The Reeks are accessed by at least 25,000 recreational users per annum. It is highly likely that the numbers are a factor of 4 times higher based on observation of the year-round level of usage – but data is required to ascertain the visitor numbers." It was estimated that 125,000 visitors entered the range in 2017 from footfall at three main access points, and that 140,000 entered in 2018 by recording footfall at four main access points. The Reeks are a popular subject for artists and photographers, with souvenir prints offered for sale among "Views of Ireland."

=== Hill walking ===
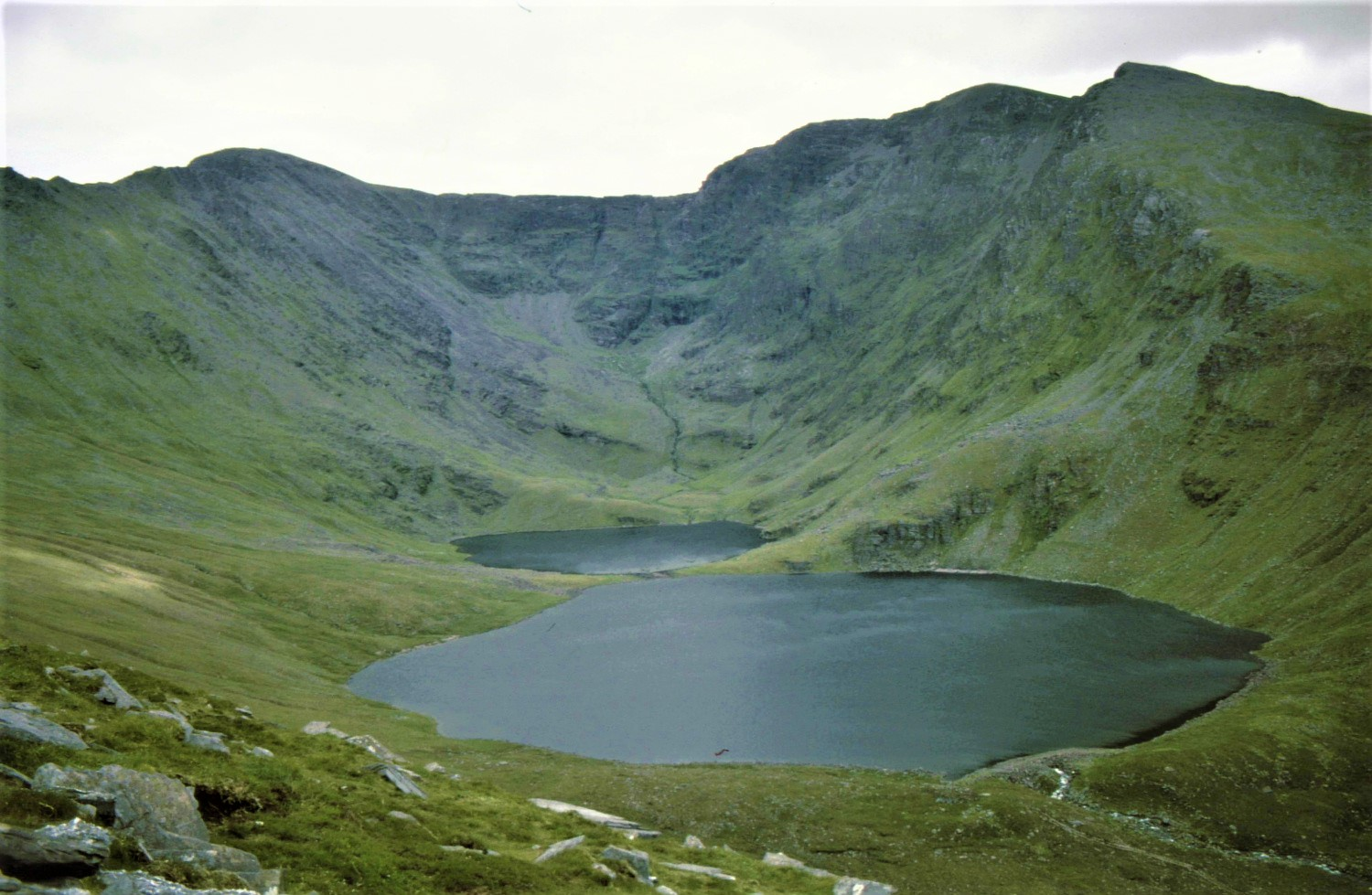
The Coomloughra Horseshoe around the Lough Coomloughra, with Caher East Top and Caher West Top on the right, Carrauntoohil back left, and the Beenkeragh Ridge on the far left.

The most common reason for visiting the Reeks is to climb Ireland's highest mountain, Carrauntoohil. The popular route starts from Cronin's Yard (V837873) and enters the Hag's Glen to climb the Devil's Ladder (the col between Carrauntoohil and Cnoc na Toinne), from which the summit is accessed. A more challenging route is via the Hag's Tooth Ridge which circles the Eagle's Nest, and takes in Beenkeragh, and the Beenkeragh Ridge.

MacGillycuddy's Reeks is particularly regarded for the quality of its ridge walking routes, with the 6–8 hour 15 kilometres (9.3 mi) Coomloughra Horseshoe, that circles Lough Coomloughra, considered "one of Ireland's classic ridge walks", which takes in all three of Ireland's 1,000 metres (3,300 ft) peaks, namely, Carrauntoohil, Beenkeragh, and Caher (East Top and West Top), as well as the famous Beenkeragh Ridge.

The most challenging route is the full MacGillycuddy's Reeks Ridge Walk, a 12- to 14-hour, 26-kilometre (16 mi) traverse of the entire range. The route normally starts at the eastern end from Kate Kearney's Cottage in the Gap of Dunloe. The route takes in Stickeen Mountain (440 metres (1,440 ft)) and Cnoc an Bhráca (731 metres (2,398 ft)) before reaching the ridge proper at Cruach Mhór (932 metres (3,058 ft)). From there it continues along the narrow arete of The Big Gun (939 metres (3,081 ft)) to Cnoc na Péiste (988 metres (3,241 ft)), and continuing along the chain of Maolán Buí (923 metres (3,028 ft)), Cnoc an Chuillinn (958 metres (3,143 ft)), Cnoc na Toinne (845 metres (2,772 ft)) to the summit of Carrauntoohil (1,038 metres (3,406 ft)).

From Carrauntoohil, a number of variations are possible, the main one being a detour to Beenkeragh (1,008 metres (3,307 ft)) before returning along the same route to get to Caher (1,000 metres (3,300 ft)) and then on to Caher West Top (975 metres (3,199 ft)) before descending to the Hydro-Track (V772871) car park near Lough Acoose, Glencar.

An alternative variation is to continue from Beenkeragh on the northern side of the Coomloughra Horseshoe to the peaks or Skregmore (848 metres (2,782 ft)) and Cnoc Íochtair (747 metres (2,451 ft)) before descending to the Hydro-Track car park.

=== Rock and winter climbing ===
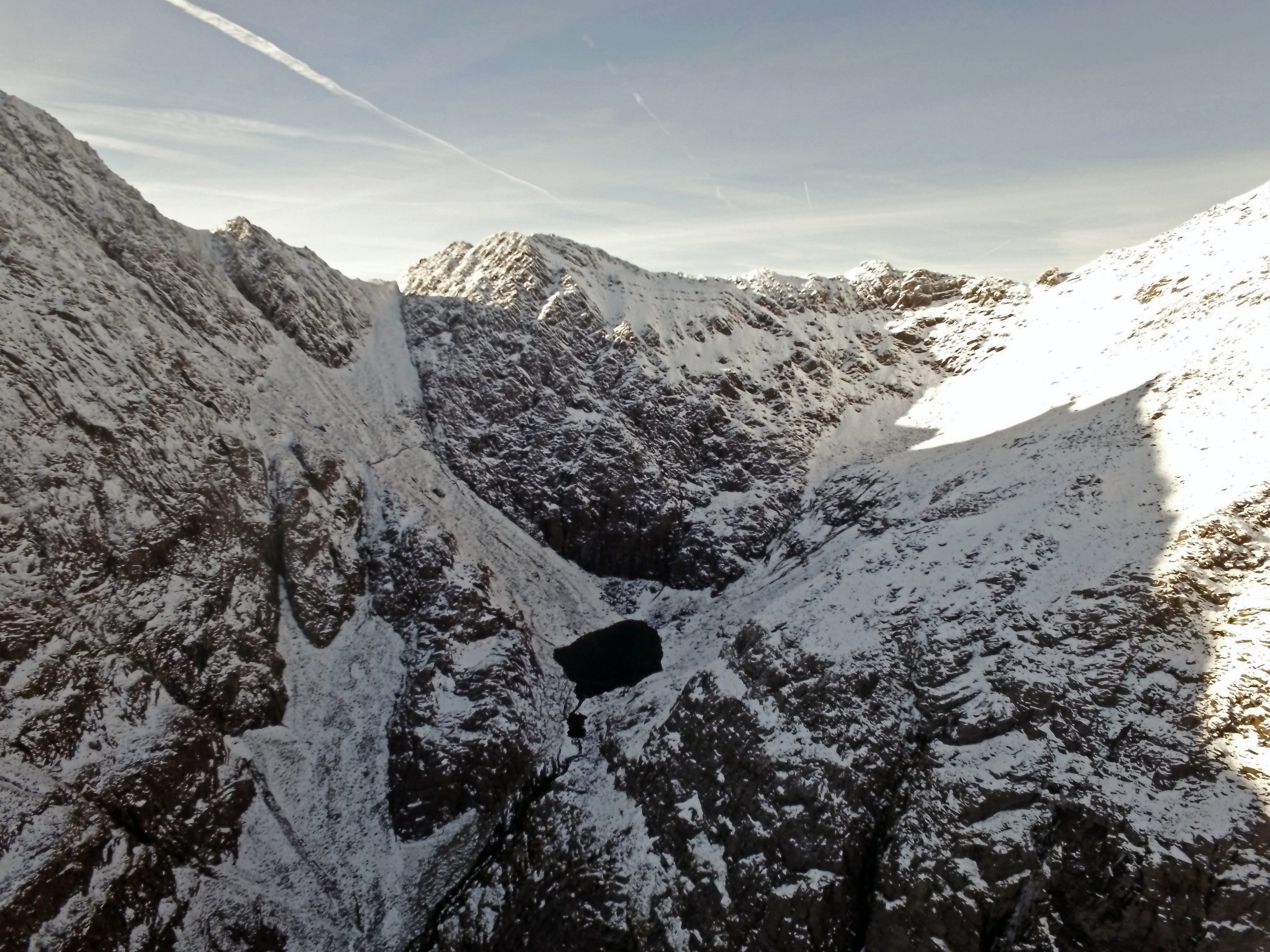
Carruntoohil's northeastern corrie (Eagle's Nest), a winter climbing area.

MacGillycuddy's Reeks are not especially known for their rock-climbing routes, unlike Ailladie in Clare or Fair Head in Antrim. The 450 metres (1,480 ft) rock climbing grade Very Difficult (V-Diff), Howling Ridge up the central arete between the east and north-east faces of Carrauntoohil is notable. The north-east face of Carrauntoohil (e.g. the Eagle's Nest area), is better known for its winter climbing, conditions permitting, offering 80 routes with 7 up to winter Grade V.

== List of peaks ==
The following is a download from the MountainViews Online Database, which lists 29 identifiable Reeks with an elevation, or height, above 100 metres (330 ft).

Furth (or Irish Munro): Height over 3,000 feet (914 m), and on the SMC Furth list.
Marilyn: Any height, and prominence over 150 metres (492 ft).

Peaks of the MacGillycuddy's Reeks (MountainViews Online Database, October 2018)
Height Rank	Prominence Rank	Name	Height (m)	Prominence (m)	Height (ft)	Prominence (ft)	Topo Map	OSI Grid Reference
1	1	Carrauntoohil	1,039	1,039	3,407	3,407	78	V804844
2	8	Beenkeragh	1,008	91	3,308	298	78	V801852
3	5	Caher	1,000	100	3,281	327	78	V793839
4	2	Cnoc na Péiste	988	253	3,241	830	78	V836842
5	25	Caher West Top	973	24	3,194	79	78	V790840
6	20	Maolán Buí	973	38	3,192	125	78	V832838
7	15	Cnoc an Chuillinn	958	53	3,143	174	78	V823833
8	21	The Bones	957	37	3,138	122	78	V801847
9	12	The Big Gun	939	74	3,081	243	78	V840845
10	22	Cruach Mhór	932	34	3,058	112	78	V841848
11	28	Cnoc an Chuillinn East Top	926	21	3,038	69	78	V828834
12	23	Knockbrinnea (W)	854	29	2,802	95	78	V807858
13	26	Stumpa Bharr na hAbhann	852	23	2,796	76	78	V797858
14	16	Skregmore	848	50	2,781	164	78	V792860
15	27	Knockbrinnea (E)	847	22	2,779	72	78	V810857
16	9	Cnoc na Toinne	845	80	2,772	262	78	V811833
17	19	Cnoc Íochtair	746	44	2,448	144	78	V785860
18	7	Cnoc an Bhráca	731	96	2,398	315	78	V858854
19	14	Cnoc na dTarbh	655	60	2,149	197	78	V862850
20	29	Hag's Tooth	650	15	2,133	49	78	V809850
21	17	Brassel Mountain	575	50	1,886	164	78	V830823
22	10	Screig Bheag	573	78	1,880	256	78	V787874
23	6	Binn Bhán	460	96	1,508	315	78	V756828
24	24	Binn Dubh	452	27	1,483	89	78	V749829
25	11	Binn Dhearg	450	76	1,475	249	78	V762820
26	18	Struicín	440	45	1,444	148	78	V866882
27	13	Cnoc Breac	425	70	1,394	230	78	V757868
28	3	Knocknabrone Hill	353	188	1,158	617	78	V801881
29	4	Gortnagan	298	122	978	400	78	V721885

== See also ==
- Lists of mountains in Ireland
- List of Irish counties by highest point
- List of mountains of the British Isles by height
- List of P600 mountains in the British Isles
- List of Furth mountains in the British Isles
- List of highest points of European countries
- List of countries by highest point
