= Maolán Buí =

Mountain in Kerry, Ireland

- Bearna Rua
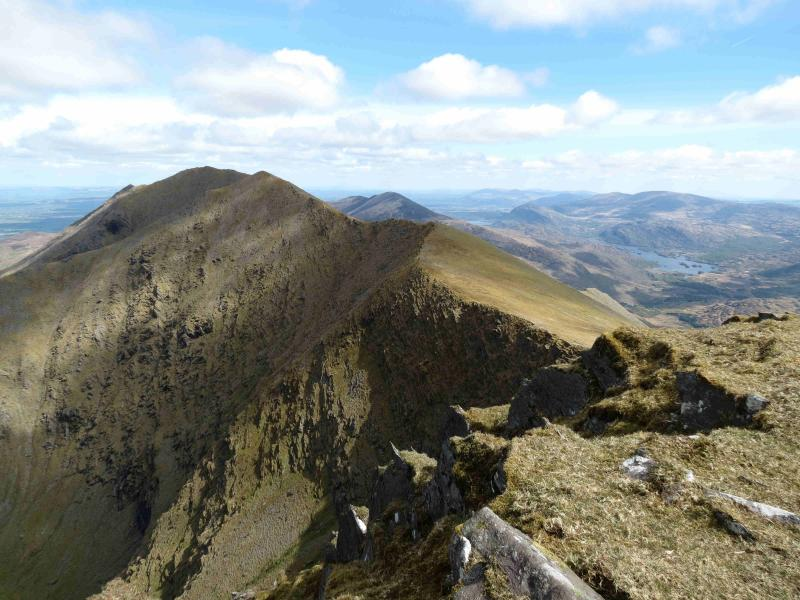
- Maolán Buí photographed from the summit of Cnoc an Chuillinn, with Cnoc an Chullinn East Top in the foreground

Highest point
- Elevation: 973 m
- Prominence: 38 m
- Listing: Furth, Hewitt, Arderin, Simm, Vandeleur-Lynam
- Coordinates: 51°59′41″N 9°42′04″W

Geography
- Location within island of Ireland
- Location: County Kerry, Ireland
- Parent range: MacGillycuddy's Reeks
- OSI/OSNI grid: V832838
- Topo map: OSI Discovery 78

Geology
- Mountain type: Well-bedded grey sandstone Bedrock

Maolán Buí (Irish for "yellow/golden round knoll"), also known by the name Bearna Rua, at 973 metres (3,192 ft) high, is the fifth-highest peak in Ireland on the Arderin list, or the sixth-highest peak in Ireland according to the Vandeleur-Lynam list. Maolán Buí is also known for its narrow north-west spur, called The Bone. It is part of the MacGillycuddy's Reeks in County Kerry.

== Geography ==
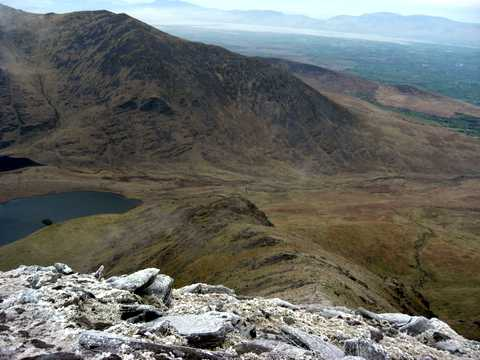
Looking down the narrow ridge of The Bone and into the Hag's Glen; as seen from the top of Maolan Bui

Maolán Buí is in the eastern part of the MacGillycuddy's Reeks in County Kerry, Ireland's highest mountain range. The peak lies on a ridge between Cnoc na Péiste 988 metres (3,241 ft) (to the northeast) and Cnoc an Chuillinn 958 metres (3,143 ft) (to the southwest), which are themselves part of the larger eastern ridge of the Reeks, which includes The Big Gun 939 metres (3,081 ft) and finishes at its far eastern end with Cruach Mhór 932 metres (3,058 ft).

A narrow north-west spur of Maolán Buí called The Bone, not to be confused with the nearby peak that sits on the Beenkeragh Ridge, The Bones 957 metres (3,140 ft), is regarded as a safe escape route from the eastern section of the main MacGillycuddy's Reeks ridge, down into the Hag's Glen and out through Cronin's Yard.

Maolán Buí is the 278th-highest mountain in Britain and Ireland on the Simm classification. It is regarded by the Scottish Mountaineering Club ("SMC") as one of 34 Furths, which is a mountain above 3,000 ft (914.4 m) in elevation, and meets the other SMC criteria for a Munro (e.g. "sufficient separation"), but which is outside of (or furth) Scotland; which is why Maolán Buí is sometimes referred to as one of the 13 Irish Munros.

Maolán Buí's prominence qualifies it to meet the Arderin classification, and the British Isles Simm and Hewitt classifications. Maolán Buí does not appear in the MountainViews Online Database, 100 Highest Irish Mountains, as the prominence threshold is over 100 m (328 ft 1 in).

== See also ==
- Lists of mountains in Ireland
- List of mountains of the British Isles by height
- List of Furth mountains in the British Isles
