= Brassel Mountain =

Mountain in Kerry, Ireland

- Cnoc Breasail
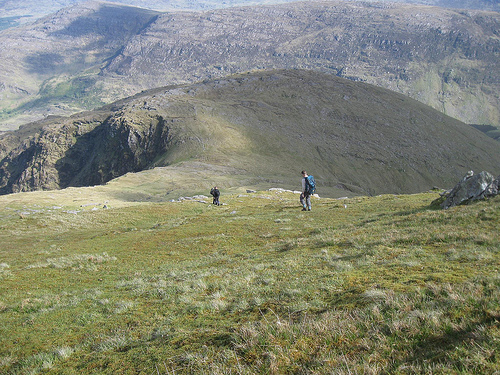
- Walking towards Brassel Mountain from the summit of Cnoc an Chuillinn

Highest point
- Elevation: 575 m (1,886 ft)
- Prominence: 50 m (160 ft)
- Listing: Arderin
- Coordinates: 51°58′52″N 9°42′13″W

Geography
- Location within Ireland
- Location: County Kerry, Ireland
- Parent range: MacGillycuddy's Reeks
- OSI/OSNI grid: V830822
- Topo map: OSI Discovery 78

Geology
- Mountain type(s): Green sandstone & purple siltstone Bedrock

Brassel Mountain (Irish: Cnoc Breasail, meaning 'hill of the raddle') (Note: Paul Tempan notes in his Irish Hill and Mountain Names (2010), that the Irish Ordnance Survey Name Book suggests that Breasal is a man's name, but that a connection with raddle, the red-dye traditionally used to mark sheep, seems more likely.) at 575 metres (1,886 ft), is the 261-st highest peak in Ireland, on the Arderin scale. It is part of the MacGillycuddy's Reeks range in County Kerry. Brassel Mountain is the south-east spur of the larger neighbouring peaks, Cnoc an Chuillinn 958 metres (3,143 ft), and Cnoc an Chuillinn East Top 926 metres (3,038 ft). Because of its positioning away from the main ridge of the Reeks, and away from the glens used to access the Reeks (e.g. the Hag's Glen), Brassel is less frequently climbed, but can be used as an exit, or entry point to the main ridge.

== See also ==
- Lists of mountains in Ireland
- List of mountains of the British Isles by height
- List of Furth mountains in the British Isles
