= The Bones =

Mountain in Kerry, Ireland

- Na Cnámha
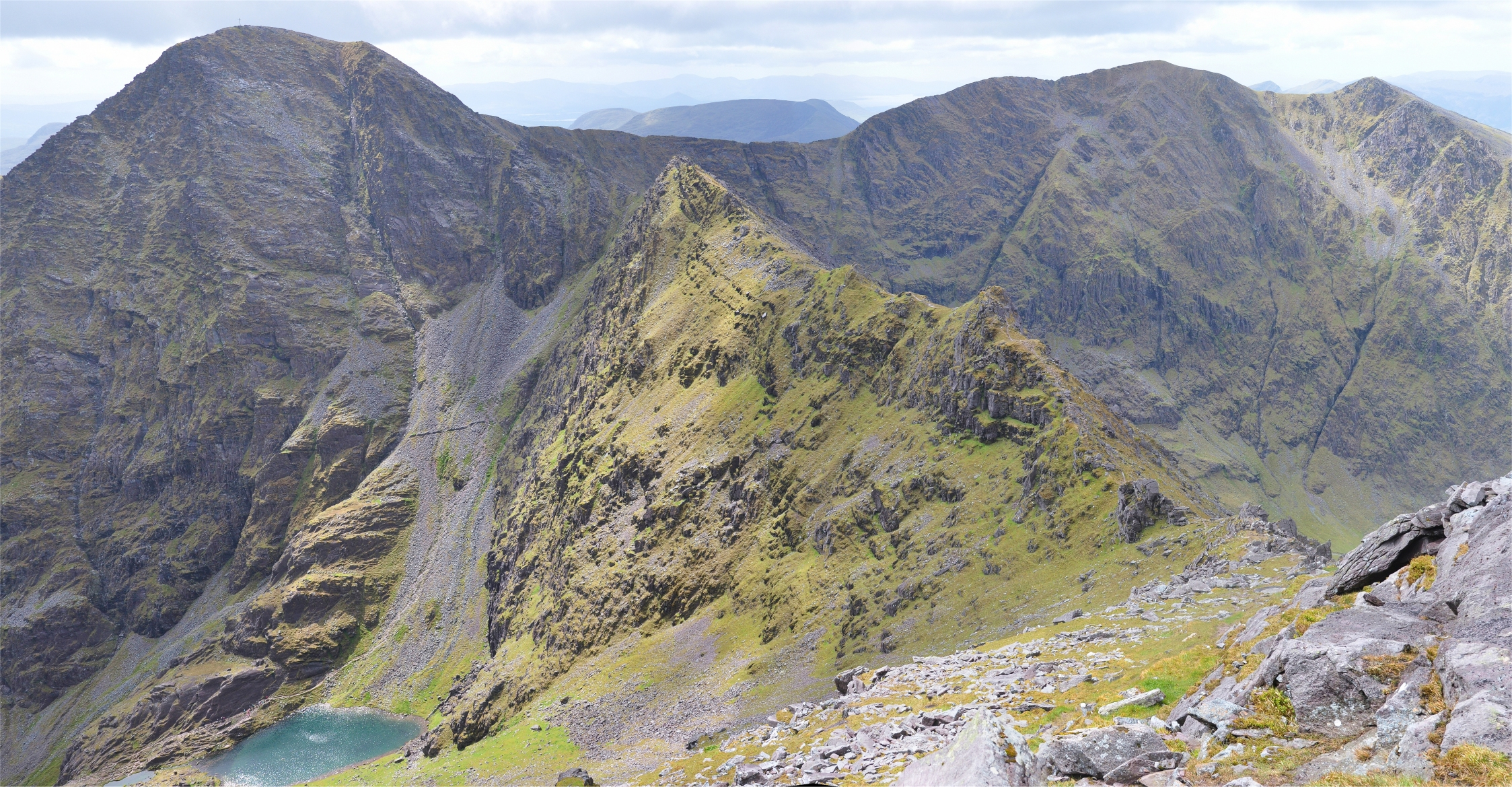
- The Bones (centre, in green) on the Beenkeragh Ridge; Carrauntoohil is back left. The large scree slope into the lake is Brother O'Shea's Gully.

Highest point
- Elevation: 957 m (3,140 ft)
- Prominence: 37 m (121 ft)
- Listing: Furth, Hewitt, Arderin, Simm, Vandeleur-Lynam
- Coordinates: 52°00′06″N 9°44′50″W

Geography
- Location within island of Ireland
- Location: County Kerry, Ireland
- Parent range: MacGillycuddy's Reeks
- OSI/OSNI grid: V800846
- Topo map: OSI Discovery 78

Geology
- Mountain type(s): Purple sandstone & siltstone Bedrock

The Bones (Irish: Na Cnámha), at 957 metres (3,140 ft) high, is the seventh-highest peak in Ireland on the Arderin list, or the eighth-highest according to the Vandeleur-Lynam list. It is part of the MacGillycuddy's Reeks in County Kerry, and is a small sharp peak on the dramatic Beenkeragh Ridge, and is sometimes mistaken with The Bone, the north-east spur of Maolán Buí, which descends into the Hag's Glen.

== Geography ==
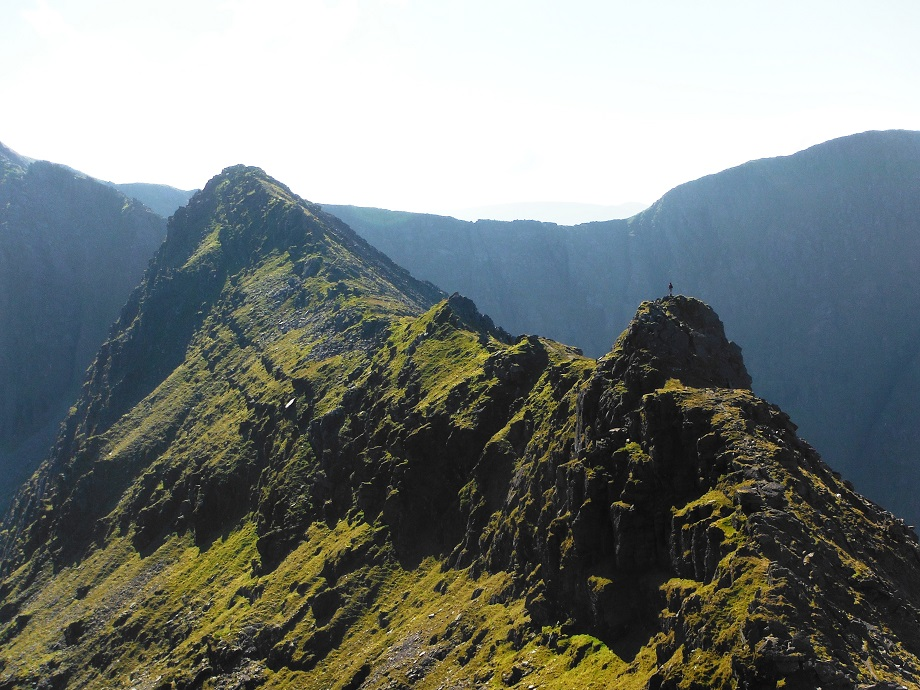
Climber on the Beenkeragh Ridge approaching The Bones, with Caher Ridge in the entire background

The Bones is the highest point on a narrow rocky arête called the Beenkeragh Ridge, situated between Carrauntoohil 1,038 metres (3,406 ft) (Ireland's highest peak), and Beenkeragh 1,008 metres (3,307 ft) (Ireland's second-highest peak), in the MacGillycuddy's Reeks range in County Kerry. The Beenkeragh Ridge is considered as "intimidating hill-walking conditions", along with the nearby The Big Gun ridge, and is often climbed as part of the Coomloughra Horseshoe.

The Bones is often confused with The Bone, the north-west spur of the nearby Maolan Bui 973 metres (3,192 ft), MountainViews Online Database reported that to avoid confusion in rescue situations, the Kerry Mountain Rescue ("KMR"), and the Ordnance Survey Ireland ("OSI") advocated for the official name of The Bones to become Na Cnámha on OSI maps.

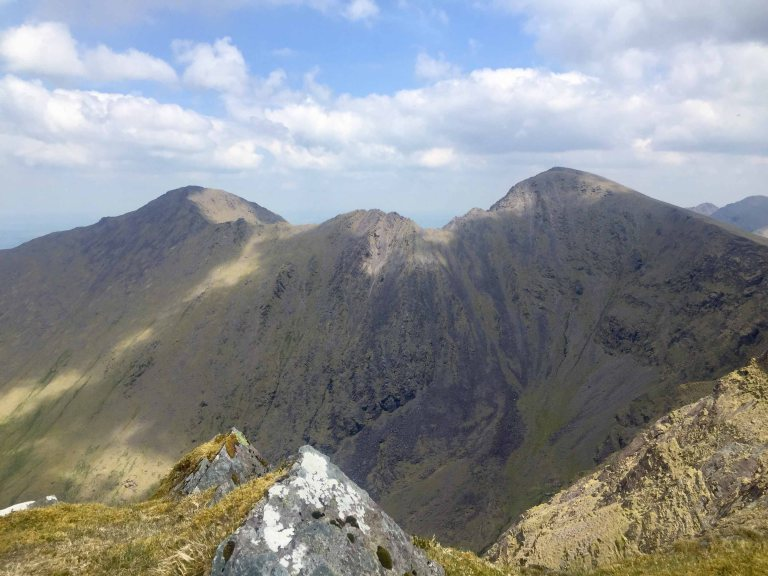
Beenkeragh (l), The Bones (m), and Carrauntoohil (r) from Caher

The Bones is the 321st-highest mountain peak in Britain and Ireland on the Simm classification. The Bones is regarded by the Scottish Mountaineering Club ("SMC") as one of 34 Furths, which is a mountain above 3,000 ft (914 m) in elevation, and meets the other SMC criteria for a Munro (e.g. "sufficient separation"), but which is outside of (or furth) Scotland; which is why The Bones is sometimes referred to as one of the 13 Irish Munros. The Bones' prominence qualifies it to meet the Arderin classification, and the British Isles Simm and Hewitt classifications. The Bones is not in the MountainViews Online Database, 100 Highest Irish Mountains, as the prominence threshold is over 100 m (328 ft).

== See also ==
- Lists of mountains in Ireland
- List of mountains of the British Isles by height
- List of Furth mountains in the British Isles
