= Cruach Mhór =

Mountain in Kerry, Ireland

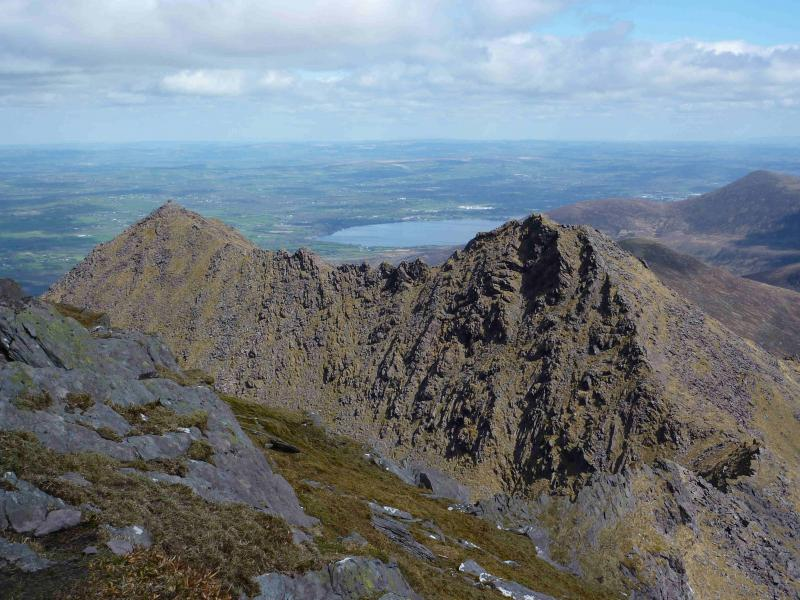
- Cruach Mhór (left), and The Big Gun (right), as seen from the summit of Cnoc na Péiste

Highest point
- Elevation: 932 m (3,058 ft)
- Prominence: 34 m (112 ft)
- Listing: Furth, Hewitt, Arderin, Simm, Vandeleur-Lynam
- Coordinates: 51°59′09″N 9°39′41″W

Geography
- Location within island of Ireland
- Location: County Kerry, Ireland
- Parent range: MacGillycuddy's Reeks
- OSI/OSNI grid: V840848
- Topo map: OSI Discovery 78

Geology
- Mountain type: Well-bedded grey sandstone Bedrock

Cruach Mhór (Irish for "big stack"), at 932 metres (3,058 ft) high, is the tenth-highest peak in Ireland on the Arderin list, and the eleventh-highest peak in Ireland according to the Vandeleur-Lynam list. A distinctive square grotto marks the summit. It is part of the MacGillycuddy's Reeks in County Kerry.

== Geography ==
Cruach Mhór is at the far eastern section of MacGillycuddy's Reeks in County Kerry, Ireland's highest mountain range. It is the first major peak in the MacGillycuddy's Reeks Ridge Walk when started from Kate Kearney's Cottage in the Gap of Dunloe. The ridge between Cruach Mhór and Cnoc na Péiste 988 metres (3,241 ft), is marked by The Big Gun 939 metres (3,081 ft) at its centre, and is considered as offering some of the most exposed and serious hill walking in Ireland (equivalent to The Bones on the nearby Beenkeragh Ridge). The Macgillycuddy's Reeks Ridge Walk continues along this ridge to Maolán Buí 973 metres (3,192 ft) and on to Carrauntoohil, Ireland's highest mountain.

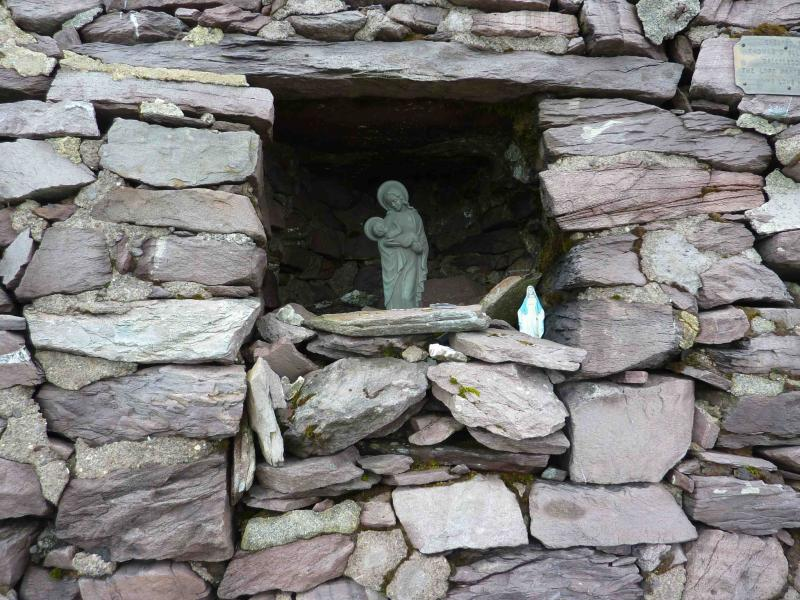
Grotto at the top of Cruach Mhor, built by a local farmer who hauled the materials up by hand

Just over 3 km to the east-northeast of Cruach Mhór, across a sharp notch, is the lesser peak of Cnoc an Bhráca 731 metres (2,398 ft). There is a lower peak to the east of Cruach Mhór known as Cruach Bheag ("little stack").

On the summit of Cruach Mhór is a stone grotto built by a local farmer who hauled up the cement on his back, and its small statue is changed every year. The square structure, which sits on the exact summit, is visible from a distance.

Cruach Mhór is the 401st-highest mountain in Britain and Ireland on the Simm classification. It is listed by the Scottish Mountaineering Club ("SMC") as one of 34 Furths, which is a mountain above 3,000 ft (914 m) in elevation, and meets the other SMC criteria for a Munro (e.g. "sufficient separation"), but which is outside of (or furth) Scotland; which is why Cruach Mhór is sometimes referred to as one of the 13 Irish Munros.

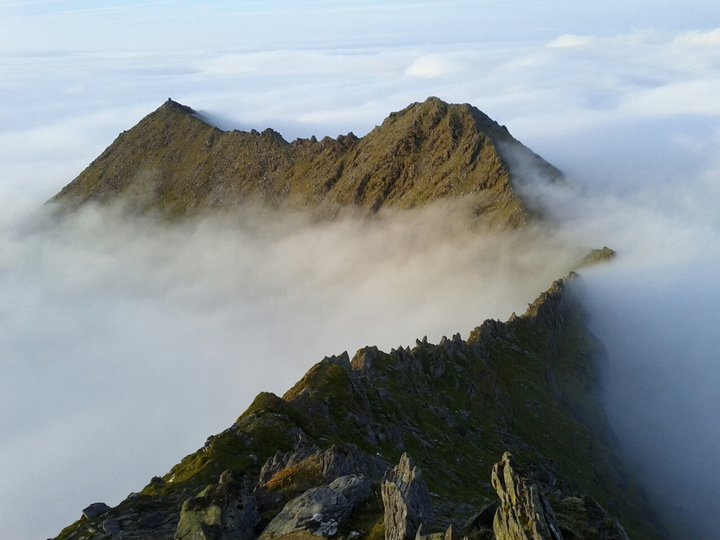
Ridge from Cnoc na Peiste, to The Big Gun (r), and on to Cruach Mhor (l), whose grotto is visible at its summit.

Cruach Mhór's prominence qualifies it to meet the Arderin classification, and the British Isles Simm and Hewitt classifications. Cruach Mhór does not appear in the MountainViews Online Database, 100 Highest Irish Mountains, as the prominence threshold is over 100 m (328 ft).

== See also ==
- Lists of mountains in Ireland
- List of mountains of the British Isles by height
- List of Furth mountains in the British Isles
