= Lough Acoose =

Lake in County Kerry, Ireland

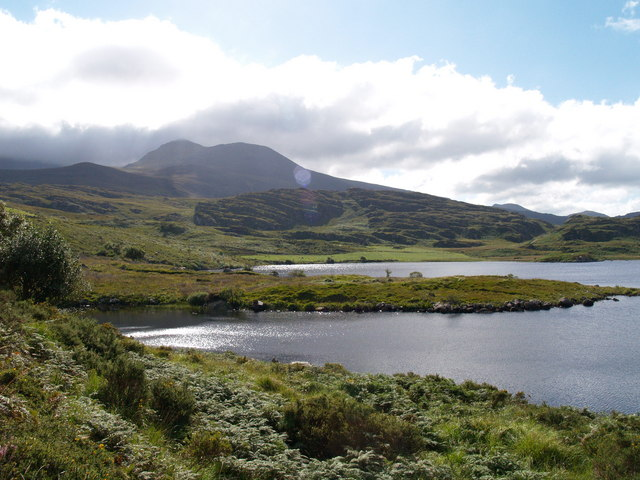

- Location in Ireland
- Location: County Kerry
- Coordinates: 52°0′26″N 9°48′42″W
- Basin countries: Ireland
- Max. length: 1.3 km (0.81 mi)
- Max. width: 0.6 km (0.4 mi)
- Surface area: 0.66 km^{2} (0.25 sq mi)
- Max. depth: 19 m (62 ft)

Lough Acoose is a freshwater lake in the southwest of Ireland. It is located on the Iveragh Peninsula of County Kerry near the MacGillycuddy's Reeks mountains.

== Geography ==
Lough Acoose measures about 1 km (0.6 mi) long and 0.5 km (0.3 mi) wide. It lies about 7 kilometres (4 mi) south of Killorglin near the village of Glencar.

== Natural history ==
Fish present in Lough Acoose include brown trout, Arctic char, salmon and the critically endangered European eel. Lough Acoose is part of the Killarney National Park, MacGillycuddy's Reeks and Caragh River Catchment Special Area of Conservation.

== See also ==
- List of loughs in Ireland
