= Astley Cooper (disambiguation) =

Astley Cooper (1768–1841), was an English surgeon and anatomist.

Astley Cooper may also refer to:

- Astley David Middleton Cooper (1856–1924), American painter
- Sir Astley Paston Cooper, 2nd Baronet (1798–1866) of the Astley-Cooper baronets
- Sir Astley Paston Paston-Cooper, 3rd Baronet (1824–1904) of the Astley-Cooper baronets

== See also ==
- Ashley Cooper (disambiguation)
