= Ashley Cooper =

Ashley Cooper may refer to:

- Ashley Cooper (politician) (1905–1981), member of the Legislative Assembly of Alberta
- Frank Bunker Gilbreth Jr. or Ashley Cooper (1911–2001), journalist, author, and newspaper executive
- Ashley Cooper (tennis) (1936–2020), Australian tennis player
- Ashley Cooper (photographer) (fl. 1980s–2010s), British photographer
- Ashley Cooper (racing driver) (1980–2008), Australian V8 Supercar driver
- Ashley Cooper (singer) (born 1988), country singer from New Zealand

== See also ==
- Ashley-Cooper, a surname
- Astley Cooper (disambiguation)
