= Cnoc na Péiste =

Mountain in Kerry, Ireland

- Knocknapeasta
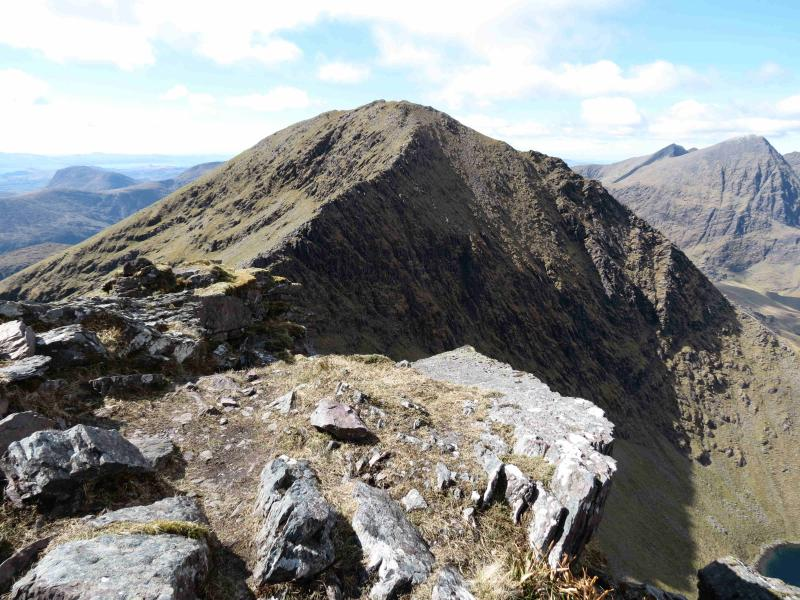
- The summit of Cnoc na Péiste seen from The Big Gun

Highest point
- Elevation: 988 m (3,241 ft)
- Prominence: 253 m (830 ft)
- Listing: Marilyn, Furth, Hewitt, Arderin, Simm, Vandeleur-Lynam
- Coordinates: 51°59′53″N 9°41′44″W

Naming
- English translation: hill of the serpent
- Language of name: Irish

Geography
- Location within Ireland
- Location: County Kerry, Ireland
- Parent range: MacGillycuddy's Reeks
- OSI/OSNI grid: V835841
- Topo map: OSI Discovery 78

Geology
- Mountain type(s): Well-bedded grey sandstone, (Lough Acoose Sandstone Formation)

Climbing
- Easiest route: Devil's Ladder (via Hag's Glen)

Cnoc na Péiste (Irish for "hill of the serpent"), anglicised Knocknapeasta, at 988 metres (3,241 ft), is the fourth-highest peak in Ireland, on the Arderin and Vandeleur-Lynam lists. Cnoc na Péiste is part of the MacGillycuddy's Reeks range in County Kerry. It is one of only two 3,000 ft peaks in the Reeks with a prominence above the Marilyn threshold of 150 metres, and is the highest summit of the Eastern Reeks. In 1943, a USAAF plane crashed into the mountain, killing all five crew, and parts of the wreckage can still be seen in Lough Cummeenapeasta.

== Geography ==
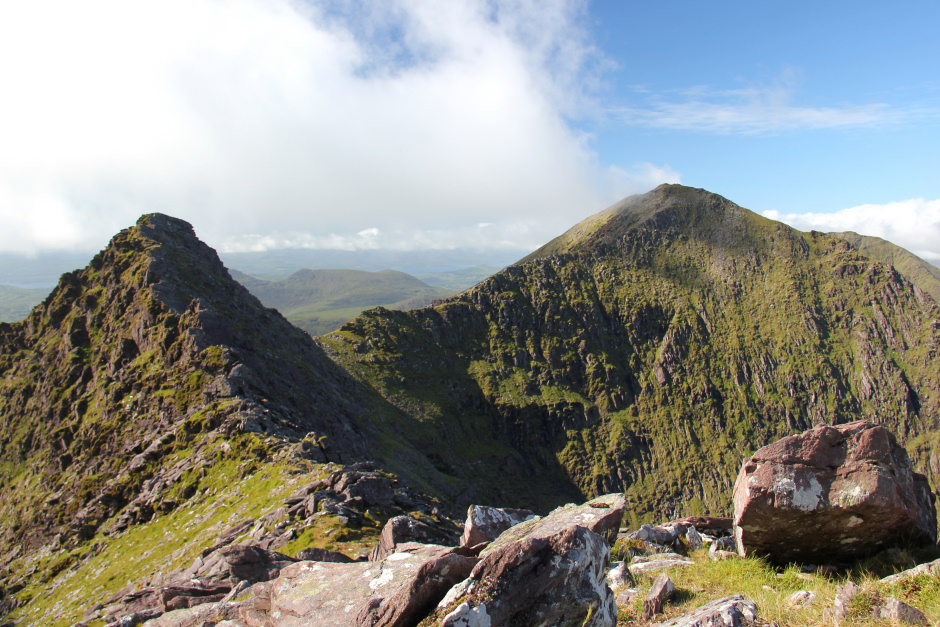
Looking westwards at the two summits of The Big Gun (left) and Cnoc na Peiste (right)

Cnoc na Péiste is the highest point in the Eastern Reeks section of the MacGillycuddy's Reeks range, which consists of a long narrow ridge that takes in several summits before ending at Cruach Mhór 932 metres (3,058 ft) and descending into the Gap of Dunloe, to the Head of the Gap, only to rise up again towards the Purple Mountain Group.

To the southwest of Cnoc na Péiste is the peak of Maolán Buí (973 m or 3,192 ft) and a generally flat grassy ridge to the col at the Devil's Ladder. To the northeast is the narrow sharp rocky arête that joins with The Big Gun (939 m or 3,081 ft), and Cruach Mhór (932 m or 3,058 ft), which marks the end of the eastern ridge of the Reeks.

Between Cnoc na Péiste and The Big Gun are two small lakes—Loch Coimín Piast (anglicised Lough Cummeenapeasta) and Lough Googh — one on either side of the ridge. A stream called Glasheencummeennapeasta flows northwards from Lough Cummeenapeasta into Hag's Glen, to join the Gaddagh River. On the other side of the ridge, a stream flows southwards from Lough Googh into the Derrycarna River.

Because of its positioning, Cnoc na Péiste is usually climbed as part of a horseshoe of the eastern section of the Reeks, starting from the Hag's Glen, and taking in Maolan Bui and The Big Gun, or as part of the even longer MacGillycuddy's Reeks Ridge Walk.

It is the 231st-highest mountain in Britain and Ireland on the Simm classification. Cnoc na Péiste is regarded by the Scottish Mountaineering Club ("SMC") as one of 34 Furths, which is a mountain above 3,000 ft (914.4 m) in elevation, and meets the other SMC criteria for a Munro (e.g. "sufficient separation"), but which is outside of (or furth) Scotland; which is why Knocknapeasta is sometimes referred to as one of the 13 Irish Munros.

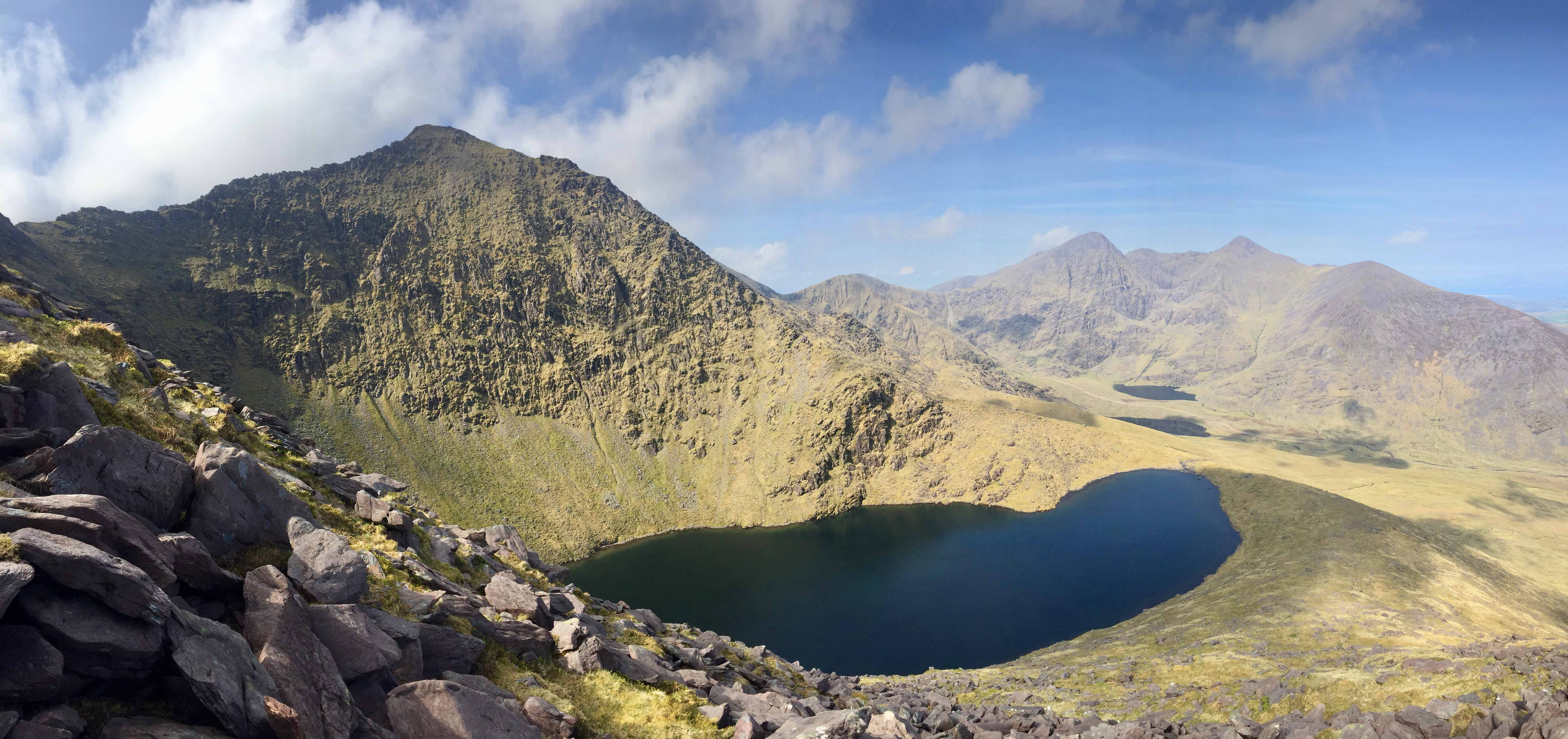
Panorama of Cnoc na Peiste and Loch Cummeenapeasta

Cnoc na Péiste's prominence qualifies it to meet the British Isles Marilyn classification, being the only other 3,000 foot Reek alongside Carrauntoohil to meet the 150 metre Marilyn prominence threshold. Cnoc na Péiste also meets the Arderin, Simm and Hewitt classifications. Knocknapeasta ranks as the second-highest mountain in Ireland on the MountainViews Online Database, 100 Highest Irish Mountains, where the prominence threshold is over 100 metres.

== Aircraft crash ==
At about 7 am on 17 December 1943, during World War II, a United States Army Air Forces (USAAF) plane crashed into the northerly face of Cnoc na Péiste. The plane was a Douglas C-47 or Dakota (serial number 43-30719) with five crewmen aboard. It struck the mountain just above Lough Cummeenapeasta at an altitude of about 2,000 ft—killing all five passengers. The Gardaí were not alerted to the crash until 3 February 1944, and the following day an Irish Army detachment was sent to recover the bodies. Pieces of the aircraft can still be seen on the mountainside, and in the lake below (a rope is tied to a piece of the wreckage in the water). A plaque was placed at the shore of the lake to commemorate the victims.

== See also ==
- Lists of mountains in Ireland
- List of mountains of the British Isles by height
- List of Furth mountains in the British Isles
- List of Marilyns in the British Isles
