= Ashley-Cooper =

Ashley-Cooper is a surname. Notable people with the surname include:

- Earls of Shaftesbury:
  - Anthony Ashley-Cooper, 1st Earl of Shaftesbury (1621–1683), English nobleman
  - Anthony Ashley-Cooper, 2nd Earl of Shaftesbury (1652–1699), English nobleman
  - Anthony Ashley-Cooper, 3rd Earl of Shaftesbury (1671–1713), English nobleman
  - Anthony Ashley-Cooper, 4th Earl of Shaftesbury (1711–1771), English nobleman
  - Anthony Ashley-Cooper, 5th Earl of Shaftesbury (1761–1811), English nobleman
  - Cropley Ashley-Cooper, 6th Earl of Shaftesbury (1768–1851), English nobleman
  - Anthony Ashley-Cooper, 7th Earl of Shaftesbury (1801–1885), English nobleman
  - Anthony Ashley-Cooper, 8th Earl of Shaftesbury (1831–1886), English nobleman
  - Anthony Ashley-Cooper, 9th Earl of Shaftesbury (1869–1961), English nobleman
  - Anthony Ashley-Cooper, 10th Earl of Shaftesbury (1938–2004), English nobleman
  - Anthony Ashley-Cooper, 11th Earl of Shaftesbury (1977–2005), English nobleman
  - Nicholas Ashley-Cooper, 12th Earl of Shaftesbury (born 1979), English nobleman
- Adam Ashley-Cooper (born 1984), Australian rugby player
- Anthony Henry Ashley-Cooper, known as Henry Ashley, (1807–1858), English cricketer
- Edward Ashley-Cooper (1906–2000), Australian actor
- F. S. Ashley-Cooper (1877–1932), English cricket historian and statistician
- William Ashley-Cooper (1803–1877), English Member of Parliament

== See also ==
- Ashley Cooper (disambiguation)
- Anthony Ashley-Cooper (disambiguation)
