= The Big Gun =

Mountain in Kerry, Ireland

- An Gunna Mór
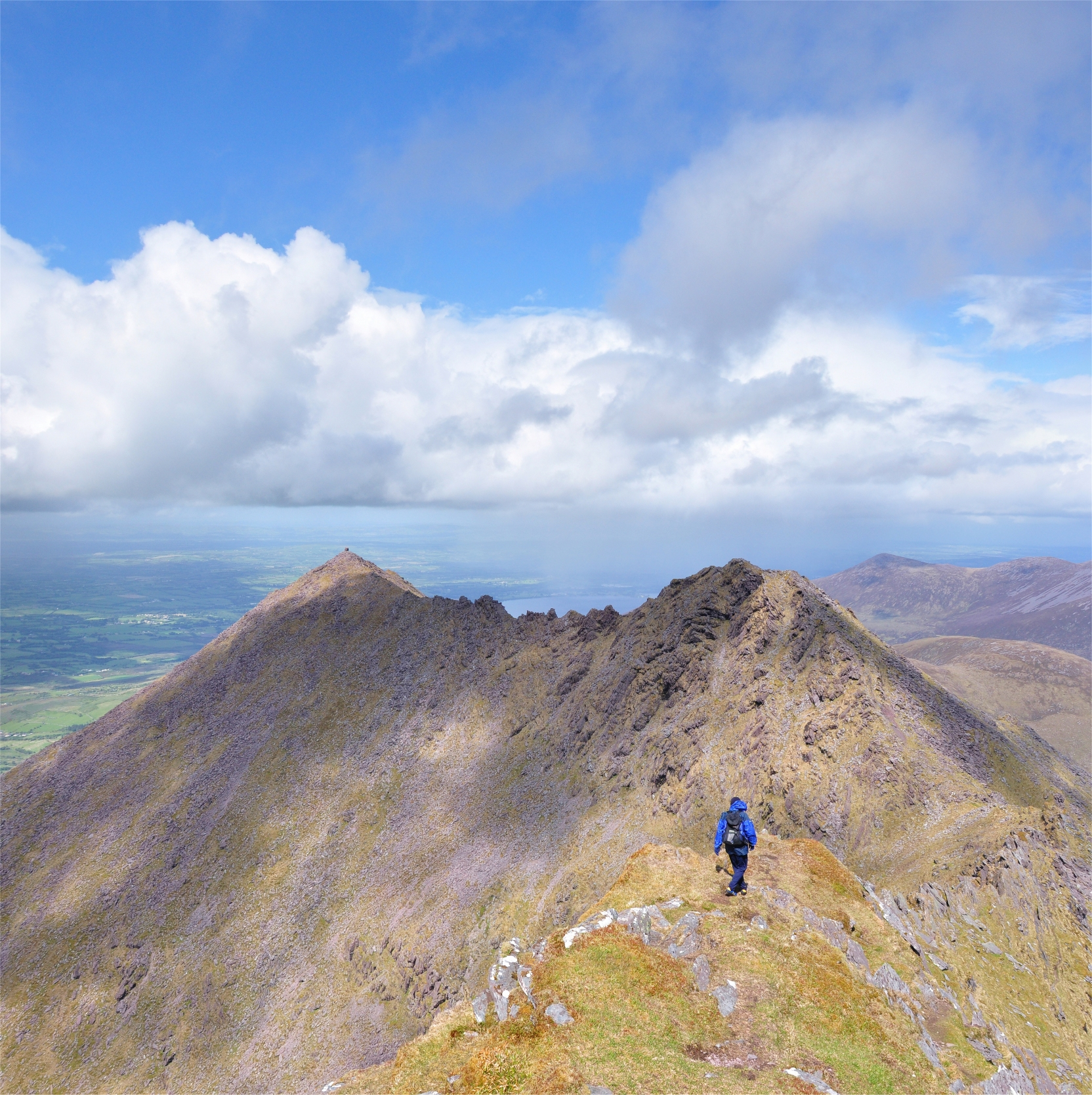
- Climber walking towards The Big Gun (right), with the summit of Cruach Mhór behind (left)

Highest point
- Elevation: 939 m (3,081 ft)
- Prominence: 74 m (243 ft)
- Listing: Furth, Hewitt, Arderin, Simm, Vandeleur-Lynam
- Coordinates: 52°00′03″N 9°41′20″W

Geography
- Location within island of Ireland
- Location: County Kerry, Ireland
- Parent range: MacGillycuddy's Reeks
- OSI/OSNI grid: V840845
- Topo map: OSI Discovery 78

Geology
- Mountain type: Well-bedded grey sandstone Bedrock

The Big Gun (Irish: An Gunna Mór), at 939 metres (3,081 ft) high, is the ninth-highest peak in Ireland on the Arderin list, or the tenth-highest according to the Vandeleur-Lynam list. It is part of the MacGillycuddy's Reeks in County Kerry, and is also known as Lackagarrin or Foilnabreachaun.

== Geography ==
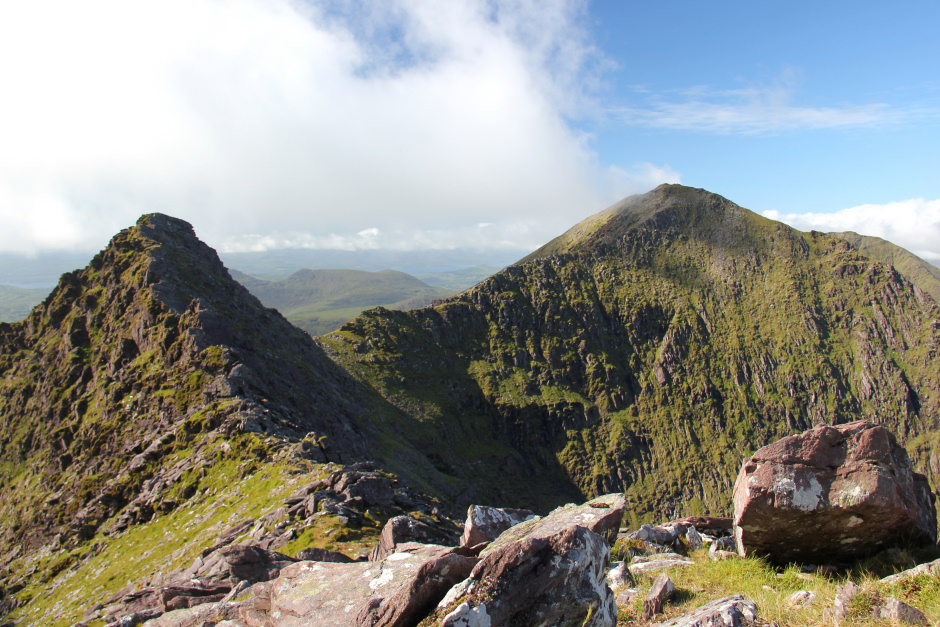
Rocky summit of the Big Gun (left), and ridge to Cnoc na Péiste (right)

The Big Gun is in the eastern section of the MacGillycuddy's Reeks in County Kerry, Ireland's highest mountain range. It is on a narrow rocky arête between the mountains of Cnoc na Péiste 988 metres (3,241 ft) to the southwest, and Cruach Mhór 932 metres (3,058 ft) to the north, and is considered as offering some of the most exposed and serious hill walking in Ireland (equivalent to The Bones on the nearby Beenkeragh Ridge).

Because of its positioning, The Big Gun is usually climbed as part of a horseshoe, or loop-walk, of the eastern section of the Reeks, starting and ending from the Hag's Glen. It is also climbed as part of the even longer MacGillycuddy's Reeks Ridge Walk, which often starts at The Big Gun's eastern end, from Kate Kearney's Cottage in the Gap of Dunloe.

The Big Gun is the 378th-highest mountain peak in Britain and Ireland on the Simm classification. It is regarded by the Scottish Mountaineering Club ("SMC") as one of 34 Furths, which is a mountain peak above 3,000 ft (914 m) in elevation, and meets the other SMC criteria for a Munro (e.g. "sufficient separation"), but which is outside of (or furth) Scotland; which is why The Big Gun is sometimes referred to as one of the 13 Irish Munros.

The Big Gun's prominence qualifies it to meet the Arderin classification, and the British Isles Simm and Hewitt classifications. The Big Gun does not appear in the MountainViews Online Database, 100 Highest Irish Mountains, as the prominence threshold is over 100 m (328 ft).

== See also ==
- Lists of mountains in Ireland
- List of mountains of the British Isles by height
- List of Furth mountains in the British Isles
