= A.D.M. Cooper =

American painter

Ashley David Middleton Cooper
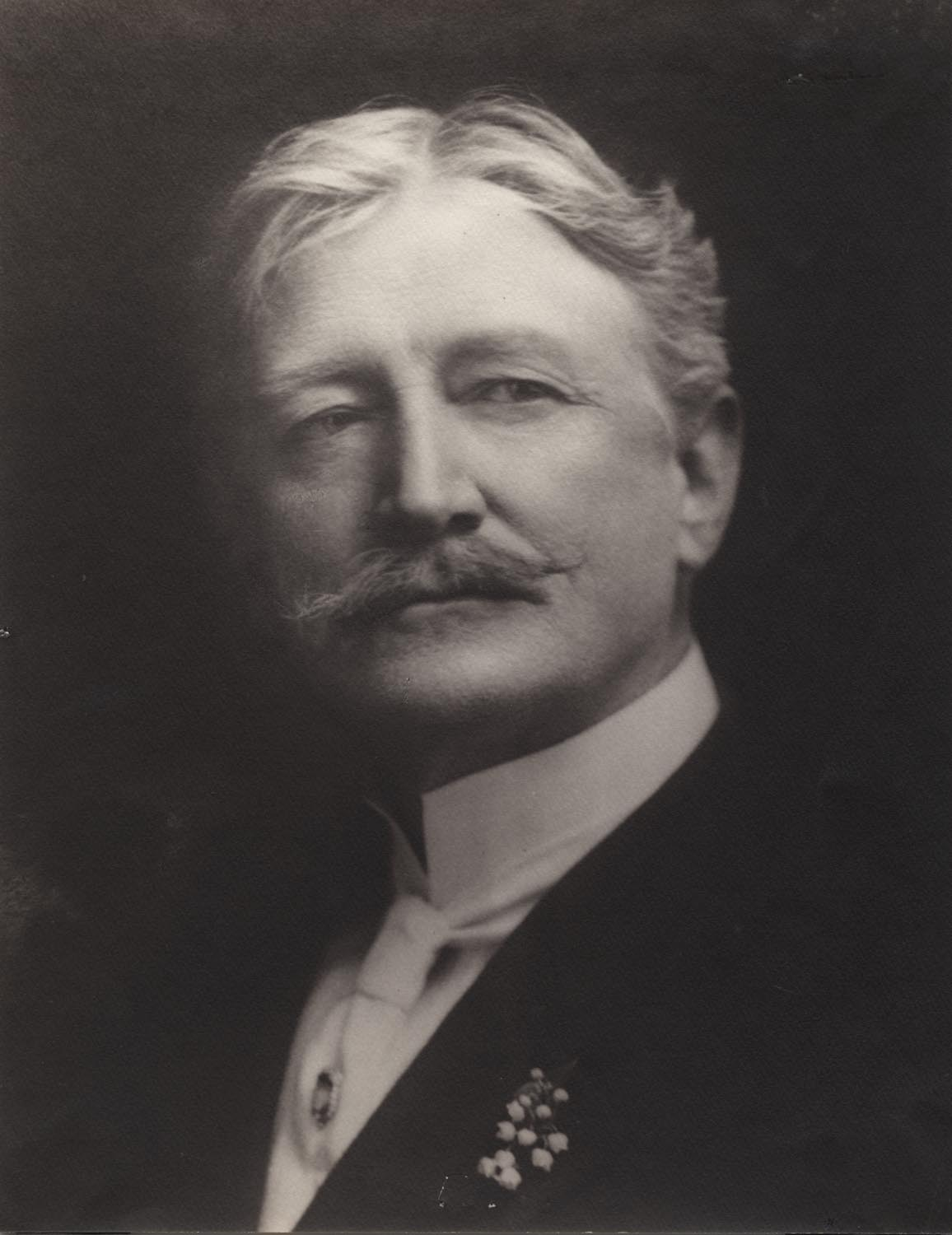
- Born: December 23, 1856; St. Louis, Missouri, United States
- Died: September 10, 1924 (aged 67)
- Education: Washington University in St. Louis
- Movement: Tonalism, Realism
- Spouse: Charlotte George

Astley David Middleton Cooper (December 23, 1856 – September 10, 1924) was an American painter of Western and Indigenous themes, as well as portraiture, and nude studies of women.

He is also attributed to having a bohemian lifestyle, which his art paid for. Cooper was opposed to the American Indian Wars, and earned Indigenous peoples' respect while living with them in the West. The artist's style seems to be derivative from Julian Rix and other landscape painters, while Cooper himself never explicitly said so.
