= List of Furth mountains in the British Isles =

34 Munros outside of Scotland

Furth
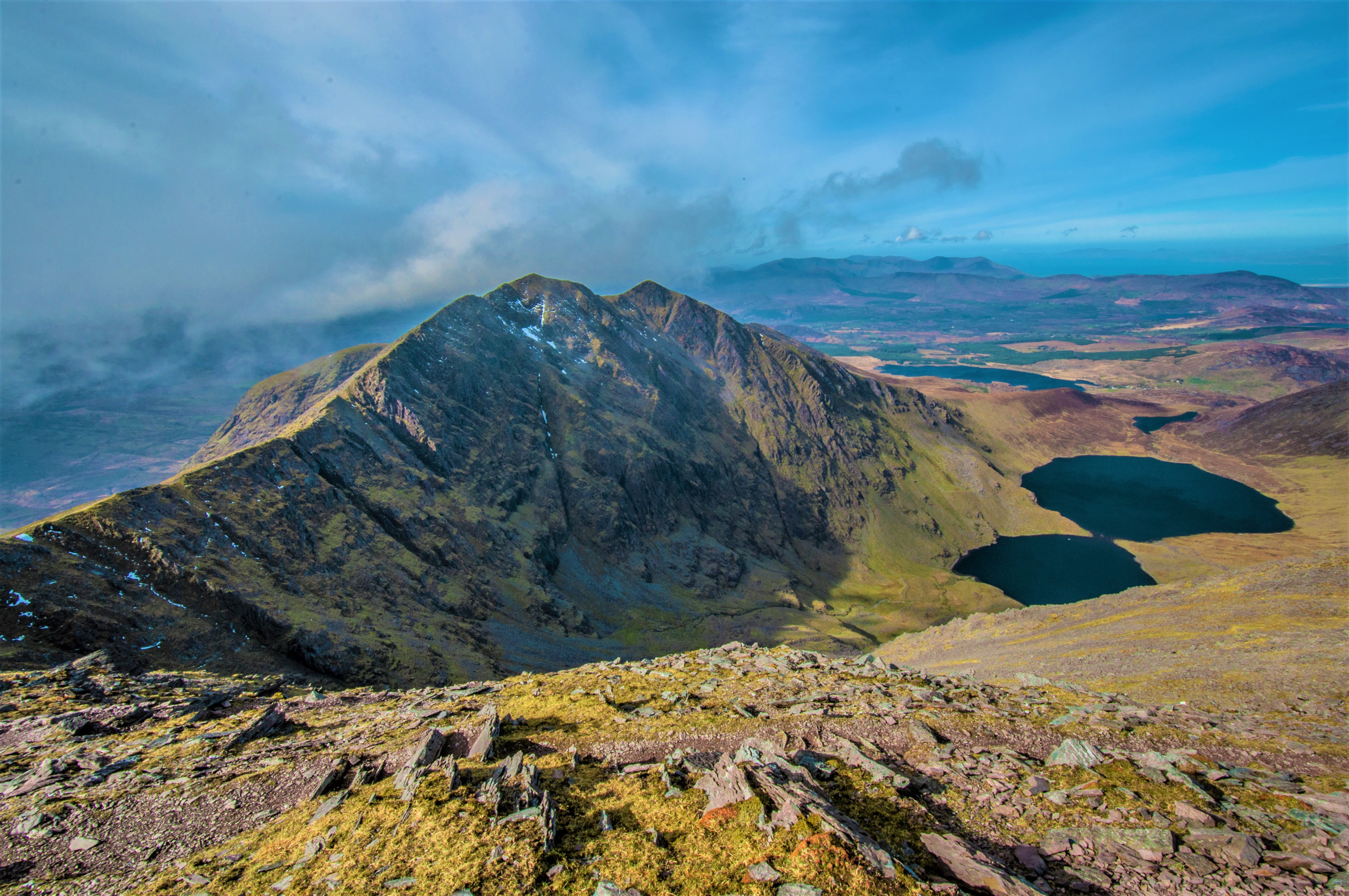
- Caher, MacGillycuddy's Reeks, Ireland, is the only Furth to have a prominence below 30 m (98 ft) (Note: 33 of the 34 SMC Furths have a prominence above 30 metres (98 feet), however, Caher West Top in Ireland, has a prominence of 24 metres (79 feet).)

Highest point
- Elevation: over 3,000 ft (914 m)
- Prominence: no requirement

Geography
- Location: 34 British Isles: 15 Wales; 13 Ireland; 6 England

This is a list of Furth mountains in Britain and Ireland by height. Furths are defined as mountains that meet the classification criteria to be a Scottish Munro, including being over 3,000 feet (914.4 m) in elevation, but which are furth of (i.e. "outside" of) Scotland. They are also called Welsh Munros, Irish Munros, and English Munros respectively, or the three-thousanders, (Note: A derivation of the Himalayan Eight-thousander) as in The Welsh 3000 challenge.

Some Furth definitions add a topographical prominence above 30 metres (98 feet), akin to a Scottish Murdo, however the official Scottish Mountaineering Club ("SMC") lists includes Furths with a prominence below this level. 14 Furths have a prominence above 150 metres (492 feet), making them also Marilyns. These Furths, which are the non-Scottish equivalents of "Marilyn Munros" or "Real Munros", are marked with (‡) in the tables below.

The SMC lists 34 Furths: six in England, 15 in Wales, and 13 in Ireland. These compare with 282 Munros and 226 Munro Tops in Scotland. Thirty three have the 30 metres (98 feet) in prominence to be Murdos. Fourteen have the 150 metres (492 feet) of prominence to be Marilyns: three in England, six in Wales, and five in Ireland. Ten have the 600 metres (1,969 feet) in prominence to be P600s, which being over 3,000 ft, makes them "Super-Majors": three in England, three in Wales, and four in Ireland.

Climbers who complete all Munros, and the SMC list of 34 Furths, are called Furthists; the SMC keeps a register which numbered 631 Furthists at October 2018. The first Furthist is registered as James A. Parker who completed all 34 Furths on 19 April 1929 (having become a Munroist in 1927). In 1986, Ashley Cooper became the first person to climb all the 3,000 ft summits in one continuous expedition, of 111 days, 2,500 km (1,600 mi), and 150 km (93 mi) of ascent.

== Furth mountains by height ==
This list was downloaded from the Database of British and Irish Hills ("DoBIH") in October 2018, and are peaks the DoBIH marks as being Furths ("F"). (Note: The Database of British and Irish Hills ("DoBIH") is the most referenced database for the classification of peaks in the British Isles, and the DoBIH is licensed under a "Creative Commons Attribution 3.0 Unported License".) The SMC updates their list of official Furths from time to time, and the DoBIH also updates their measurements as more detailed surveys are recorded, so these tables should not be amended or updated unless the entire DoBIH data is re-downloaded again.

British Isles Furth mountains, ranked by height (DoBIH, October 2018)
Height Rank	Name [other]	Country	Section / Region	County	Height (m)	Prom. (m)	Height (ft)	Prom. (ft)	Topo Map	OS Grid Reference	Classification (§ DoBIH codes)
1	Snowdon [Yr Wyddfa]	Wales	30B: Snowdonia	Gwynedd	1,085	1,039	3,560	3,409	115	SH609543	Ma,F,Sim,Hew,N,CoH,CoU,CoA
2	Crib y Ddysgl	Wales	30B: Snowdonia	Gwynedd	1,065	72	3,495	236	115	SH610551	F,Sim,Hew,N
3	Carnedd Llewelyn	Wales	30B: Snowdonia	Conwy/Gwynedd	1,064	750	3,491	2,461	115	SH683643	Ma,F,Sim,Hew,N,CoU
4	Carnedd Dafydd	Wales	30B: Snowdonia	Conwy/Gwynedd	1,044	111	3,425	364	115	SH662630	Hu,F,Sim,Hew,N
5	Carrauntoohil [Corrán Tuathail]	Ireland	50C: MacGillycuddy's Reeks	Kerry	1,039	1,039	3,407	3,407	78	V803844	Ma,F,Sim,Hew,Dil,A,VL,CoH,CoU
6	Beenkeragh	Ireland	50C: MacGillycuddy's Reeks	Kerry	1,008	91	3,308	298	78	V801852	F,Sim,Hew,Dil,A,VL,sHu
7	Glyder Fawr	Wales	30B: Snowdonia	Conwy/Gwynedd	1,001	642	3,284	2,106	115	SH642579	Ma,F,Sim,Hew,N
8	Caher	Ireland	50C: MacGillycuddy's Reeks	Kerry	1,000	100	3,281	327	78	V792838	F,Sim,Hew,Dil,A,VL,sHu
9	Glyder Fach	Wales	30B: Snowdonia	Conwy	994	75	3,262	244	115	SH656582	F,Sim,Hew,N
10	Cnoc na Peiste [Knocknapeasta]	Ireland	50C: MacGillycuddy's Reeks	Kerry	988	254	3,241	833	78	V835841	Ma,F,Sim,Hew,Dil,A,VL
11	Scafell Pike	England	34B: Lake District C&W	Cumbria	978	912	3,209	2,992	89 90	NY215072	Ma,F,Sim,Hew,N,W, B,Sy,Fel,CoH,CoU,CoA
12	Pen yr Ole Wen	Wales	30B: Snowdonia	Conwy/Gwynedd	978	45	3,209	148	115	SH655619	F,Sim,Hew,N
13	Foel Grach	Wales	30B: Snowdonia	Conwy/Gwynedd	975	42	3,200	137	115	SH688659	F,Sim,Hew,N
14	Caher West Top	Ireland	50C: MacGillycuddy's Reeks	Kerry	973	24	3,194	79	78	V789840	F,Dil,VL,sSim
15	Maolan Bui	Ireland	50C: MacGillycuddy's Reeks	Kerry	973	41	3,192	135	78	V832838	F,Sim,Hew,Dil,A,VL
16	Scafell	England	34B: Lake District C&W	Cumbria	964	132	3,162	434	89 90	NY206064	Hu,F,Sim,Hew,N,W,B,Sy,Fel
17	Yr Elen	Wales	30B: Snowdonia	Gwynedd	962	57	3,156	187	115	SH673651	F,Sim,Hew,N
18	Cnoc an Chuillinn	Ireland	50C: MacGillycuddy's Reeks	Kerry	958	54	3,143	177	78	V823833	F,Sim,Hew,Dil,A,VL
19	Na Cnamha	Ireland	50C: MacGillycuddy's Reeks	Kerry	957	37	3,138	122	78	V800846	F,Sim,Hew,A,VL
20	Brandon Mountain	Ireland	49A: Dingle Peninsula	Kerry	952	927	3,122	3,041	70	Q460116	Ma,F,Sim,Hew,Dil,A,VL
21	Helvellyn	England	34C: Lake District E	Cumbria	950	712	3,117	2,336	90	NY342151	Ma,F,Sim,Hew,N,W,B,Sy,Fel,CoH
22	Y Garn	Wales	30B: Snowdonia	Gwynedd	947	236	3,107	774	115	SH630595	Ma,F,Sim,Hew,N
23	Foel-fras	Wales	30B: Snowdonia	Conwy/Gwynedd	944	63	3,097	206	115	SH696681	F,Sim,Hew,N
24	The Big Gun	Ireland	50C:MacGillycuddy's Reeks	Kerry	939	70	3,081	230	78	V840845	F,Sim,Hew,Dil,A,VL
25	Broad Crag	England	34B: Lake District C&W	Cumbria	935	58	3,069	189	89 90	NY218075	F,Sim,Hew,N,B,Sy
26	Cruach Mhor	Ireland	50C: MacGillycuddy's Reeks	Kerry	932	32	3,058	105	78	V840848	F,Sim,Hew,Dil,A,VL
27	Skiddaw	England	34A: Lake District N	Cumbria	931	709	3,054	2,326	89 90	NY260290	Ma,F,Sim,Hew,N,W,B,Sy,Fel
28	Ill Crag	England	34B: Lake District C&W	Cumbria	931	49	3,054	159	89 90	NY223073	F,Sim,Hew,N,B,Sy
29	Lugnaquilla	Ireland	55A: Wicklow Mountains	Wicklow	925	849	3,035	2,785	56	T032917	Ma,F,Sim,Hew,Dil,A,VL,CoH,CoU
30	Garnedd Uchaf	Wales	30B: Snowdonia	Gwynedd	925	33	3,035	108	115	SH686669	F,Sim,Hew,N
31	Elidir Fawr	Wales	30B: Snowdonia	Gwynedd	924	212	3,031	696	115	SH611612	Ma,F,Sim,Hew,N
32	Crib Goch	Wales	30B: Snowdonia	Gwynedd	923	65	3,028	213	115	SH624551	F,Sim,Hew,N
33	Galtymore	Ireland	53A: Galty Mountains	Limerick/Tipperary	918	821	3,011	2,694	74	R878237	Ma,F,Sim,Hew,Dil,A,VL,CoH,CoU
34	Tryfan	Wales	30B: Snowdonia	Conwy	918	191	3,010	627	115	SH664593	Ma,F,Sim,Hew,N

== Furth mountains by country ==
The following are a breakdown of Furths by country, and also marking the highest mountain classification grade by prominence (e.g. P600, Mayilyn, Hewitt etc.).

Class (highest class shown) (Note: Because all Furths are over 3,000 feet (914.4 m), and therefore meet all the elevation thresholds of Hewitts and Nuttals/Vandeleur-Lynams (P600s and Marilyns do not have elevation thresholds), the only difference is on prominence. 10 have the prominence to be therefore, the colouring given to a Furth in the tables, is based on the highest definition of prominence that the Furth achieved.)	Prominence
P600s‡	Over 600 m
Marilyns‡	Over 150 m
Hewitts	Over 30 m
Nuttalls and Vandeleur-Lynams (Note: Nuttalls refers to mountains in England and Wales, the Irish equivalent of Nuttalls is the Vandeleur-Lynam list)	Over 15 m

=== English Munros ===
Peak	Height (m)	Prominence (m)	OSI Grid Reference	Highest Class	Parent Peak (Note: Parent peak is a term used in topographic prominence which can produce results that seem unusual, but are based on the specific guidelines used by the OSI in estimating prominence, and the hierarchy of prominence.)	
Scafell Pike‡	978	912	NY215072	P600	Snowdon	Sca Fell
Sca Fell	964	133	NY207065	Hewitt	Scafell Pike	Sca Fell
Helvellyn‡	950	712	NY342151	P600	Scafell Pike	Helvellyn
Ill Crag	935	57	NY223073	Hewitt	Scafell Pike	Helvellyn
Broad Crag	934	52	NY218075	Hewitt	Ill Crag	Helvellyn
Skiddaw‡	931	709	NY260290	P600	Helvellyn	Skiddaw

(‡) Have the prominence of over 150 metres (492 ft) to qualify as a Marilyn

=== Welsh Munros ===
The 15 Welsh Furths (or Welsh Munros) are part of the Welsh 3000 Challenge.

Peak	Height (m)	Prominence (m)	OSI Grid Reference	Highest Class	Parent Peak	
Snowdon‡ or Yr Wyddfa	1085	1039	SH609543	P600	Ben Nevis	Snowdon
Garnedd Ugain or Crib y Ddysgl	1065	72	SH610551	Hewitt	Snowdon	Snowdon
Carnedd Llewelyn‡	1064	750	SH683644	P600	Snowdon	Snowdon
Carnedd Dafydd	1044	111	SH663630	Hewitt	Carnedd Llewelyn	Snowdon
Glyder Fawr‡	1001	642	SH642579	P600	Snowdon	Carnedd Llewelyn
Glyder Fach	994	75	SH656582	Hewitt	Glyder Fawr	Carnedd Llewelyn
Pen yr Ole Wen	978	45	SH655619	Hewitt	Carnedd Llewelyn	Carnedd Llewelyn
Foel Grach	976	40	SH688658	Hewitt	Carnedd Llewelyn	Carnedd Llewelyn
Yr Elen	962	57	SH673650	Hewitt	Carnedd Llewelyn	Pen yr Ole Wen
Y Garn‡	947	236	SH630595	Marilyn	Glyder Fawr	Pen yr Ole Wen
Foel-fras	944	61	SH696681	Hewitt	Carnedd Llewelyn	Pen yr Ole Wen
Garnedd Uchaf	926	32	SH687669	Hewitt	Carnedd Llewelyn	Pen yr Ole Wen
Elidir Fawr‡	924	212	SH612613	Marilyn	Y Garn	Tryfan
Crib Goch	923	65	SH624551	Hewitt	Snowdon	Tryfan
Tryfan‡	918	191	SH664593	Marilyn	Glyder Fawr	Tryfan

(‡) Have the prominence of over 150 metres (492 ft) to qualify as a Marilyn

=== Irish Munros ===
There are 13 Furths in Ireland listed by the Scottish Mountaineering Club, which are also referred to as the Irish Munros.

Peak	Height (m)	Prominence (m)	OSI Grid Reference	Highest Class	Parent Peak	
Carrauntoohil‡	1039	1039	V8036584426	P600	n.a.	Carrauntoohil
Beenkeragh	1008	91	V8013985245	Hewitt	Carrauntoohil	Carrauntoohil
Caher	1000	100	V7926183891	Hewitt	Carrauntoohil	Caher
Cnoc na Péiste‡	988	254	V8359084176	Marilyn	Carrauntoohil	Caher
Caher West Top	973	24	V7899084004		Caher	Maolán Bui (centre: 4th from left)
Maolán Bui	973	41	V8321483814	Hewitt	Cnoc na Péiste	Maolán Bui (centre: 4th from left)
Cnoc an Chuillin	958	54	V8234683338	Hewitt	Cnoc na Péiste	The Bones (centre)
The Bones	956	37	V8007084680	Hewitt	Carrauntoohil	The Bones (centre)
Brandon Mountain‡	952	927	Q4604511610	P600	Carrauntoohil	Brandon Mountain
The Big Gun	939	70	V8400084500 est.	Hewitt	Cnoc na Péiste	Brandon Mountain
Cruach Mhór	932	32	V8400084800 est.	Hewitt	The Big Gun	Lugnaquilla
Lugnaquilla‡	925	849	T0320091700 est.	P600	Carrauntoohil	Lugnaquilla
Galtymore‡	919	899	R8784623788	P600	Carrauntoohil	Lugnaquilla

(‡) Have the prominence of over 150 metres (492 ft) to qualify as a Marilyn

== DoBIH codes ==
The DoBIH uses the following codes for the various classifications of mountains and hills in the British Isles, which many of the above peaks also fall into:

- Ma Marilyn
- Hu HuMP
- Sim Simm
- 5 Dodd
- M Munro
- MT Munro Top
- F Furth
- C Corbett
- G Graham
- D Donald
- DT Donald Top
- Hew Hewitt
- N Nuttall
- Dew Dewey
- DDew Donald Dewey
- HF Highland Five
- 4 400-499m Tump
- 3 300-399m Tump (GB)
- 2 200-299m Tump (GB)
- 1 100-199m Tump (GB)
- 0 0-99m Tump (GB)
- W Wainwright
- WO Wainwright Outlying Fell
- B Birkett
- Sy Synge
- Fel Fellranger
- CoH County Top – Historic (pre-1974)
- CoA County Top – Administrative (1974 to mid-1990s)
- CoU County Top – Current County or Unitary Authority
- CoL County Top – Current London Borough
- SIB Significant Island of Britain
- Dil Dillon
- A Arderin
- VL Vandeleur-Lynam
- MDew Myrddyn Dewey
- O Other list (which includes):
  - Bin Binnion
  - Bg Bridge
  - BL Buxton & Lewis
  - Ca Carn
  - CT Corbett Top
  - GT Graham Top
  - Mur Murdo
  - P500 P500
  - P600 P600
- Un unclassified

prefixes:
- s sub
- x deleted

suffixes:
= twin

== See also ==
- Lists of mountains and hills in the British Isles
- List of mountains of the British Isles by height
- Lists of mountains and hills in the British Isles
- Lists of mountains in Ireland
- List of Munro mountains
- List of Murdo mountains
- List of Marilyns in the British Isles
- List of P600 mountains in the British Isles
