= Ashley Cooper (photographer) =

British photographer

Ashley Cooper is a British photographer with a particular interest in documenting the effects of global warming. His 2013 photograph of a polar bear that had starved to death was published in The Guardian and elsewhere and called attention to the effect of the lack of sea ice in the Arctic.

== Early life and education ==
Cooper graduated from the University of Wales Aberystwyth in 1983 with a B.Sc. in physical geography. In 1986 he became the first person to climb all the 3,000 ft summits of Great Britain and Ireland (the Munros and the Furths) in one continuous expedition of 111 days, 2,500 km, and 150 km of ascent.

== Photography ==
Cooper won the climate change category of the 2010 Environmental Photographer of the Year, and was one of the judges for the 2018 competition.

In 2016 he published Images from a Warming Planet: One man's mission to document climate change around the world (Global Warming Images: ISBN 978-1526205926), a large-format book containing 495 photographs, the result of a 13-year journey through 33 countries.

== Personal life ==
He is married to Jill and lives in Ambleside, Cumbria, where he has been a member of the Langdale/Ambleside Mountain Rescue Team for over 20 years.
