= Glencar, County Kerry =

Settlement in County Kerry, Ireland

Coordinates: 51.9945°N 9.8580°W

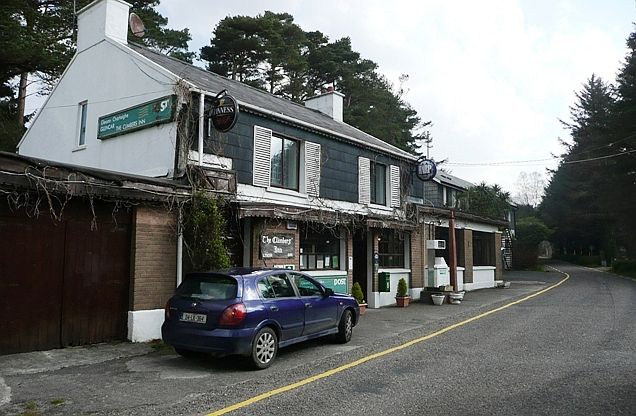
Glencar's post office is at "The Climbers' Inn", Glencar

Glencar (Irish: Gleann Chárthaigh) is a populated area in County Kerry, Ireland. The housing in Glencar is geographically distributed and, while it does not have a traditional village centre, the central point for the community is the post office and shop at "The Climbers' Inn". It is located on the Kerry Way walking route, close to Carrauntoohil.

The Catholic church, St. Stephen's Church in Glencar, is in Glenbeigh parish within the Roman Catholic Diocese of Kerry. The local Gaelic Athletic Association (GAA) club is Glenbeigh-Glencar GAA. The nearby national (primary) school, at Boheshill in Glencar, had an enrollment of 21 pupils in 2024.
