= List of mountains of the British Isles by height =

Highest peaks, prominence over 30 m

Highest mountains in Great Britain ("Simms" classification)
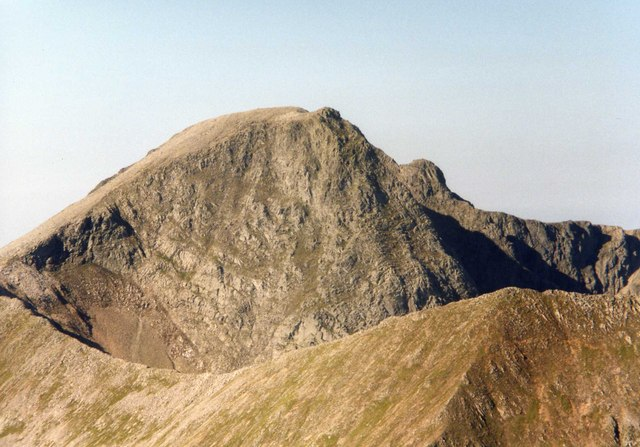
- Ben Nevis, in the Scottish Highlands, is the highest mountain in The British Isles

Highest point
- Elevation: over 600 m (1,969 ft)
- Prominence: over 30 m (98 ft)

Geography
- Location: 2,756 British Isles: 2,192 Scotland; 223 Ireland (Note: As of October 2018, the Irish MountainViews Online Database, list the prominence of Knockbrinnea (W) as 29m, and Carrignabinnia as 27 m, and thus they do not qualify as Irish Arderins, which means that MountainViews does not classify these two peaks as Simms; the total number of Irish Arderins over 600 m is thus 222. The DoBIH however uses the Harvey Tables which list the prominence for both at 30 m, and thus the DoBIH class them as Irish Simms, giving 224 Irish Simms in total.); 192 England; 150 Wales; 1 Isle of Man

This article provides access to lists of mountains in Britain and Ireland by height and by prominence. (See Lists of mountains below.) Height and prominence are the most important metrics for the classifications of mountains by the UIAA; with isolation a distant third criterion. (Note: No definition of a British Isles mountain or hill uses an explicit quantitative metric of topographic isolation (e.g. distance to the next point of equal height), however, the concept of isolation is embedded in the qualitative definition of a Scottish Munro, from the Scottish Mountaineering Club requirement of "sufficient separation" (instead of prominence).) The list is sourced from the Database of British and Irish Hills ("DoBIH") (Note: The Database of British and Irish Hills ("DoBIH") is the most referenced database for the classification of peaks in the British Isles, and the DoBIH is licensed under a "Creative Commons Attribution 3.0 Unported License".) for peaks that meet the consensus height threshold for a mountain, namely 600 metres (1,969 ft); the list also rules out peaks with a prominence below 30 metres (98 ft) and thus, the list is therefore precisely a list of the 2,756 (Note: Some sites list 2753 Simms, however, the Database of British and Irish Hills ("DoBIH") has added an extra Irish Simm, Knockbrinnea (W), bringing the total as at October 2022 to 2756.) Simms in the British Isles (as at October 2022). Many classifications of mountains in the British Isles consider a prominence between 30–150 metres (98–492 ft) as being a "top", and not a mountain; however, using the 30 metres (98 ft) prominence threshold gives the broadest possible list of mountains. For a ranking of mountains with a higher prominence threshold use:

- List of Marilyns in the British Isles, for ranking by height and by prominence, of peaks with prominence over 150 metres (492 ft); or
- List of P600 mountains in the British Isles, for ranking by height and by prominence, of peaks with prominence over 600 metres (1,969 ft)

== Coverage of Simms ==
Despite using the lower threshold for prominence of 30 metres (98 ft), the UIAA threshold for an "independent" peak, one Scottish Munro is missing, namely Maoile Lunndaidh whose official prominence changed to 11 metres (36 ft) in 2014; (Note: 281 of the 282 Scottish Munros have an official OSI prominence above 30 m, except Maoile Lunndaidh, who was found in a 2014 survey to be lower than nearby Creag Toll a' Choin. Thus, Maoile Lunndaidh had its official prominence downgraded from 400 m to just under 11 m, and the 400 m of prominence given to Creag Toll a' Choin. Note that Creag Toll a' Choin had previously been a Munro until older surveys downgraded its status in favour of Maoile Lunndaidh.) (Note: There is no known "composite" list of British Isles mountains that merges the Munro definition with other defined lists; the closest defined lists that include almost all Munros, are those that reduce the minimum prominence threshold to 30 metres (98 ft).) As of October 2018, the list of 2,754 British Isles Simms contained:

- 281 of the 282 Munros, and 158 of the 226 Munro Tops;
- All 222 Corbetts, all 219 Grahams, and all 118 Scottish New Donalds;
- 872 of the 2,011 British Isles Marilyns;
- All 524 of the England, Wales, and Ireland Hewitts;
- 117 of the 541 Lake District Birketts (of which 99 are Wainwrights), that meet the Simms criteria;
- All 224 of the 407 Irish Arderins with a height above 600.0 m;
- All of the 120 P600 ("major") mountains in the British Isles;
- 33 of the 34 England, Wales and Ireland Furths. (Note: 33 of the 34 SMC Furths have a prominence above 30 metres (98 feet), however, Caher West Top in Ireland, has a prominence of 24 metres (79 feet).)

== Simms by height by prominence ==
This list was downloaded from the DoBIH in October 2018, and includes all British and Irish peaks with a prominence below 30 metres (98 ft). Note that topographical prominence is complex to measure and requires a survey of the entire contours of a peak, rather than a single point of height. These tables are therefore subject to being revised over time, and should not be amended or updated unless the entire DoBIH data is re-downloaded again. The default table ranking is by height, so where the table is sorted by for example Region, the table will list the mountains within each Region by order of height.

Regional Top: The highest mountain in England, Wales, Scotland, Ireland, or the Isle of Man

== Lists of mountains ==
- List of mountains of the British Isles by height (1–500)
- List of mountains of the British Isles by height (501–1000)
- List of mountains of the British Isles by height (1001–1500)
- List of mountains of the British Isles by height (1501–2000)
- List of mountains of the British Isles by height (2001–2500)
- List of mountains of the British Isles by height (2501–3000)

== DoBIH codes ==
The DoBIH uses the following codes for the various classifications of mountains and hills in the British Isles, which many of the above peaks also fall into:

- Ma Marilyn
- Hu HuMP
- Sim Simm
- 5 Dodd
- M Munro
- MT Munro Top
- F Furth
- C Corbett
- G Graham
- D Donald
- DT Donald Top
- Hew Hewitt
- N Nuttall
- Dew Dewey
- DDew Donald Dewey
- HF Highland Five
- 4 400-499m Tump
- 3 300-399m Tump (GB)
- 2 200-299m Tump (GB)
- 1 100-199m Tump (GB)
- 0 0-99m Tump (GB)
- W Wainwright
- WO Wainwright Outlying Fell
- B Birkett
- Sy Synge
- Fel Fellranger
- CoH County Top – Historic (pre-1974)
- CoA County Top – Administrative (1974 to mid-1990s)
- CoU County Top – Current County or Unitary Authority
- CoL County Top – Current London Borough
- SIB Significant Island of Britain
- Dil Dillon
- A Arderin
- VL Vandeleur-Lynam
- O Other list (which includes):
  - Bin Binnion
  - Bg Bridge
  - BL Buxton & Lewis
  - Ca Carn
  - CT Corbett Top
  - GT Graham Top
  - Mur Murdo
  - P500 P500
  - P600 P600
- Un unclassified

prefixes:
- s sub
- x deleted

suffixes:
= twin

== People who have climbed all hills in a group ==
As of 31 December 2023, 7,654 people had climbed all 282 Scottish Munros; as of April 2020 eleven people had climbed all 1556 Marilyns of Great Britain; (Note: Does include the IOM, but does not include the 454 Marilyns on the Island of Ireland) while as of December 2024 only six people had climbed all the 2532 Simms of Great Britain: (Note: Does not include IOM or Ireland) Ken Whyte (Cruachan Beag 21/09/2010), Iain Thow (Cut Hill 07/06/2015), Michael Earnshaw (Cruach Fhiarach 16/07/2019), Rob Woodall (Sgurr Dhonuill West Top 28/06/2021), Anne Bunn (Torr Ceum na Caillich, 24/09/2022) and Callum Gray (Sgurr Dubh, 21/12/2024). The first three have also climbed the Irish Simms, so including all the Simms of the British Isles.

== See also ==
- Lists of mountains and hills in the British Isles
- Lists of mountains in Ireland
- List of Munro mountains
- List of Murdo mountains
- List of Furth mountains in the British Isles
- List of Marilyns in the British Isles
- List of P600 mountains in the British Isles
