= Scottish Mountaineering Club =

Mountaineering club in Scotland

Established in 1889, the Scottish Mountaineering Club is a club for climbing and mountaineering in Scotland.

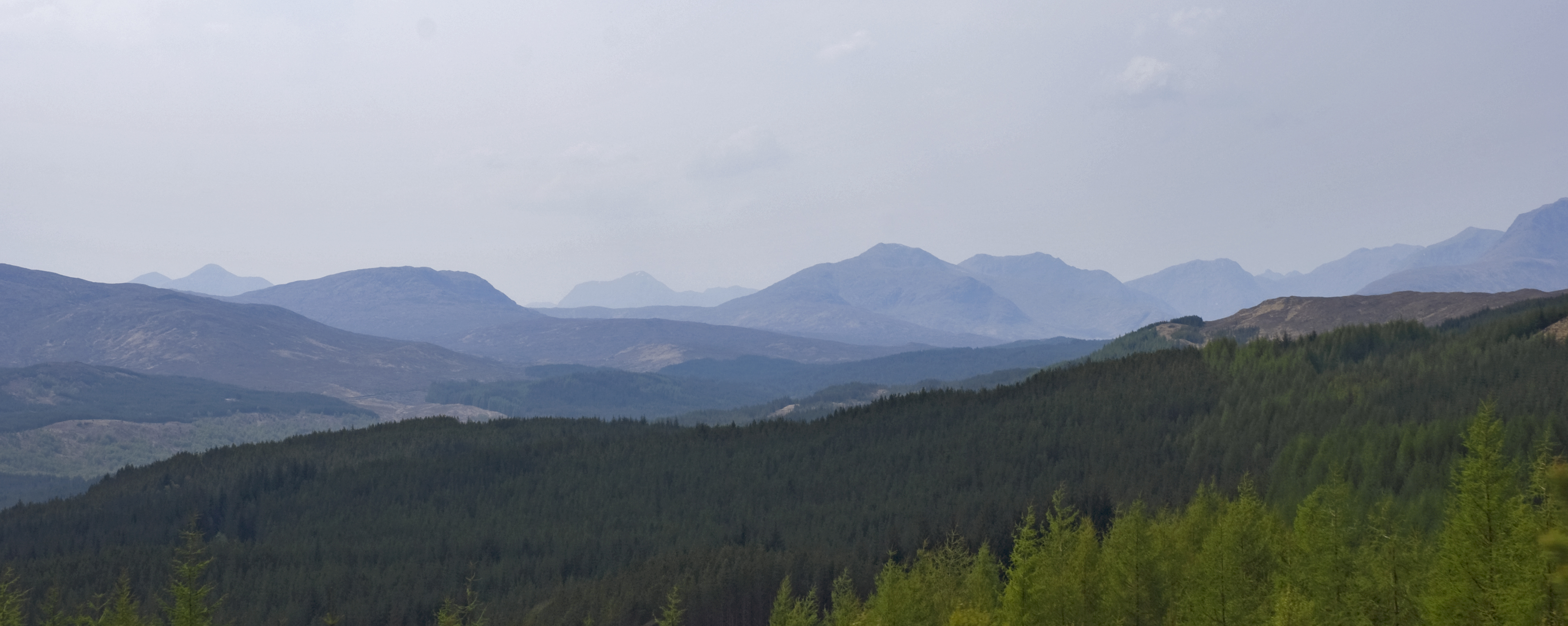
Mountains in Scotland

== History ==
The Scottish Mountaineering Club (SMC) was formed in Glasgow, Scotland, in March 1889, as one of Scotland's first mountaineering clubs. The club was initially proposed by William Wilson Naismith, a Scottish accountant and mountaineer, who published a letter in the Glasgow Herald in January 1889 that suggested establishing a Scottish version of the Alpine Club. According to club records, the object of the SMC was:

To encourage mountaineering in Scotland in winter as well as summer; to serve as a bond of union amongst all lovers of mountain climbing; to create facilities for exploring the less known parts of the country; to collect various kinds of information, especially as regards routes, distances, means of access, time occupied in ascents, character of rocks, extent of snow in winter, etc., and in general to promote everything that will conduce to the convenience of those who take a pleasure in mountains and mountain scenery.

— Objects of the Club, http://gdl.cdlr.strath.ac.uk/smcj/smc1894.htm

The purpose of the SMC was to document the exploration of the Scottish Highlands and its local flora and fauna. Soon after its inception, the SMC began publishing the Scottish Mountaineering Club Journal in 1890. The Journal provided their members and other alpine groups with lists of accommodations, guidebooks and maps of climbing areas.

In 1945, the SMC joined the British Mountaineer Council, a coalition of 25 alpine climbing clubs. The Club was responsible for overseeing the whole of Scotland.

== Affiliations ==
In addition to climbing, the SMC promotes the wider interests of mountaineering in Scotland. 3 May 1963, the Club established the Scottish Mountaineering Trust (SMT), a charity, to promote and support health, education and recreation in the mountains of Scotland and elsewhere. The SMT is supported by the proceeds of guidebooks and other publications and donates back to groups, projects and individuals with the scientific or educational objectives of wildlife conservation and management. As of 2019 the Trust recontributed over 1.5 million euros.

SMT also operates and maintains five mountain huts which can be booked by members and other clubs from the UK and abroad. These huts are strategically placed near scenery in mountaineering areas in Scotland.

A subsidiary of the SMT is the Scottish Mountaineering Press (SMP), a publishing company, launched in 2020, that prints previous and current publications of the SMC. In 2022, the Press released the Scottish Mountaineering Press Creatives, a nonprofit, digital publication that produces online content for artists and authors. All profits from these publications are disbursed by the Trust as grants. The largest area of expenditure has been in supporting footpath repair and maintenance in the Scottish Mountains, although substantial support is also given to mountain rescue teams for equipment, facilities, mountaineering education and training, especially that aimed at young people.

== Membership ==
Original membership to the club was strictly limited to elite male society. There were less than 100 founding members of the club. According to the 1894 Scottish Mountaineering Club Journal, to qualify for membership, a candidate had to list their Scottish ascents as proof of their climbing accomplishment, submit a statement of their "contributions to science, art or literature in connection with Scottish mountains", and be sponsored by two members.

Women were first admitted to the Club in 1990.

Today, the SMC consists of competent climbers and mountaineers, both men and women, who have a commitment to climbing in Scotland. According to their official website, the criteria for membership in the SMC includes documented experience climbing in Scotland, in all seasons, over various types of terrains, with 50 or more ascents over 3,000 feet (910 m). The application encourages participation in SMC projects or charities as well as a list of personal contributions to the arts and sciences. It must contain the sponsorship of a current member along with three other member references. There are around 500 members currently.

Some members are at the forefront of Scottish mountaineering developments:

- W. H. Murray was one of the preeminent mountaineers of the 1930s and wrote many books on climbing and mountaineering in Scotland. His book, Mountaineering in Scotland, published in 1947, is considered a classic of the genre.
- Percy Unna, a keen conservationist, raised the funds to purchase Glen Coe and other highland areas, ultimately presenting them to the National Trust for Scotland in order to safeguard them for future generations. Percy conceived of "The Unna Rules" for the National Trust in 1937, detailing a guide for land conservation reform that continues to be influential today.
- Dougal Haston and Doug Scott were the first from the UK to successfully summit Mount Everest in 1975.
- Sir Hugh Munro catalogued the distinct 3000 foot mountains of Scotland, publishing his tables in the SMC journal in 1891. These mountains are now known as "The Munros" and "Munro Baggers" are people who focus on climbing them all.

== Compleators ==
Someone who has climbed all of the Munro mountains is bestowed by the SMC, represented in this case by Clerk of the Munro List, also sometimes referred to as Clerk of the List, with the title Compleator. "Compleat" is an archaic spelling of the word complete. While complete means having all the required elements or skills, compleat has come to have its own distinct meaning, that of quintessential or perfectly representative. The usage of this alternative spelling by the SMC is traditional.

The SMC keeps a list of those who wish to record their completion of the Munros and, as of 9 October 2023, there are 7,581 who have compleated. It also maintains Hill Lists for the Munro Tops, Furths, Corbetts and Donalds.

== Publishing ==
Through the Trust and its imprint, Scottish Mountaineering Press, the Club produces and publishes the definitive Climbers' Guides to Scotland's mountains and outcrops (17 books), the authoritative guides for hill-walkers and scramblers in Scotland (12 books) and a further 12 books on the Scottish mountain environment, its history and its culture, plus an annual Journal, copies of which are free to download from the Club's website. The Munros Guide is the bestseller.

== Library ==
The Club's library is held within the Andersonian Library at the University of Strathclyde Archives and Special Collections. It contains historical and current publications by the Scottish Mountaineering Club and Scottish Mountaineering Trust from 1707 to date. In addition, there is a large collection of historical images relating to early SMC members and mountaineering in Scotland. According to SMC, the collection includes "books on: technical and philosophical aspects of mountaineering, climbing, skiing, hill walking and other outdoor pursuits; fiction and literature; biographies and autobiographies; travel and exploration from across the world which includes an extensive collection of Scottish texts; history of mountaineering; antiquarian collection of 18th century Scottish travel and tour books".

Extensive archives can also be found at the National Library of Scotland.

== See also ==
- Alpine Club
- List of Munro mountains
- List of Corbett mountains
- List of Graham mountains
- List of Donald mountains
