= Bethesda, Gwynedd =

Bethesda
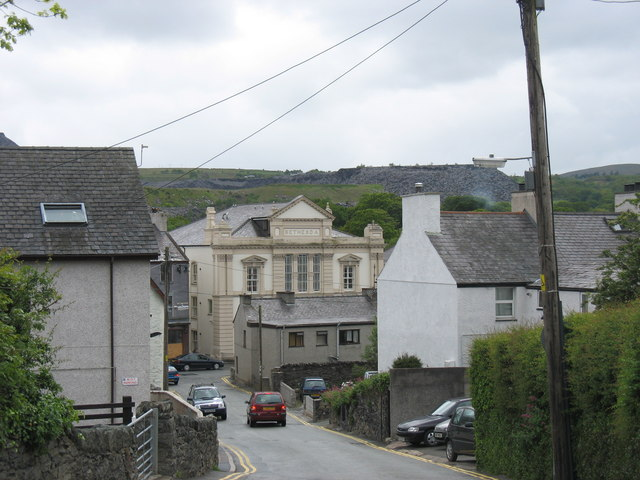
- The former Capel Bethesda from Penybryn Road.

- Location within Gwynedd
- Population: 4,735 (2011)
- OS grid reference: SH624667
- Community: Bethesda
- Principal area: Gwynedd
- Preserved county: Gwynedd
- Country: Wales
- Sovereign state: United Kingdom
- Post town: Bangor
- Postcode district: LL57
- Dialling code: 01248
- Police: North Wales
- Fire: North Wales
- Ambulance: Welsh
- UK Parliament: Bangor Aberconwy
- Senedd Cymru – Welsh Parliament: Bangor Conwy Môn
- List of places UK Wales Gwynedd 53.179°N 4.060°W Map of the community

Bethesda (/bɛˈθɛzdə/; Welsh: [bɛˈθɛsda]) is a town and community in Gwynedd, Wales. It is on the banks of Afon Ogwen and on the edge of Snowdonia. It is about 5 miles (8 km) south-west of Bangor. It is a predominantly Welsh-speaking town.

== History ==
The settlement's ancient name was Cilfoden, formerly known as Glanogwen. In 1820 the Bethesda Independent Chapel was built and the town subsequently grew around and later named after it. The chapel was enlarged in 1840.

The town grew around the slate quarrying industries; the largest of the local quarries is the Penrhyn Quarry. At its peak, the town exported purple slate all over the world. Penrhyn Quarry suffered a three-year strike led by the North Wales Quarrymen's Union between 1900 and 1903 – the longest industrial dispute in British history. This led to the building of a street of houses in the nearby village of Tregarth, by the quarry owners, to house the families of those workers who opted not to strike. It also led to the formation of three co-operative quarries, the largest of which Pantdreiniog dominated the town for many years.

The A5 road runs through Bethesda and marked the border between Lord Penrhyn's land, and the freehold land. Most of the town is to the east and northeast of the road, with housing packed onto the hillside in irregular rows, built on the commons. On the current high street, all the public houses are found on the south side of the road.

=== Railways ===
The narrow gauge Penrhyn Quarry Railway opened in 1801 to serve Penrhyn Quarry. It connected the quarry with Port Penrhyn on the coast and operated until 1962. In 1884, a branch of the London and North Western Railway's network from Bangor was opened, along with a station for the town. The line closed to passengers in 1951 and to freight in 1963.

The trackbed of the Penrhyn Quarry Railway towards Porth Penrhyn is taken over by the Lôn Las Ogwen cycle path.

== Modern Bethesda ==
The population of Bethesda was 4,735 in 2011. Current opportunities for employment in the town are limited: there are a few manufacturing businesses; most businesses are in the low-paid service sector and hospitality industry.

Ysgol Dyffryn Ogwen ("Ogwen Valley School") is a bilingual comprehensive school, with 374 pupils, established in 1951.

Zip World Velocity in Penrhyn Quarry is the longest zipline in Europe, at just over 1,600 metres (0.99 miles) long, and brings the town hundreds of visitors.

== Governance ==
There are two tiers of local government covering Bethesda, at community and county level, with both councils using Welsh as their primary language: Cyngor Cymuned Bethesda (Bethesda Community Council) and Cyngor Gwynedd (Gwynedd Council). The community council has its offices at 26 Stryd Fawr (High Street) and meets at Canolfan Cefnfaes, a former school on Mostyn Terrace, now converted into a community facility.

=== Administrative history ===
Bethesda was historically part of the parish of Llanllechid. The nascent town grew rapidly from the 1820s with the development of the local quarries. By the 1850s it was clear that the area needed more formal structures of local government, particularly to supply water and sewers, maintain the streets, and regulate the town's further development. A body of improvement commissioners was therefore established in 1854.

Improvement commissioners' districts such as Bethesda were converted into urban districts under the Local Government Act 1894. The 1894 Act also directed that parishes could no longer straddle district boundaries, and so a parish of Bethesda was created from the part of Llanllechid parish within the urban district.

Bethesda Urban District was abolished in 1974 under the Local Government Act 1972. A community called Bethesda was created instead, covering the area of the abolished urban district. District-level functions passed to Arfon Borough Council, which was in turn replaced in 1996 by Gwynedd Council.

== Architecture ==
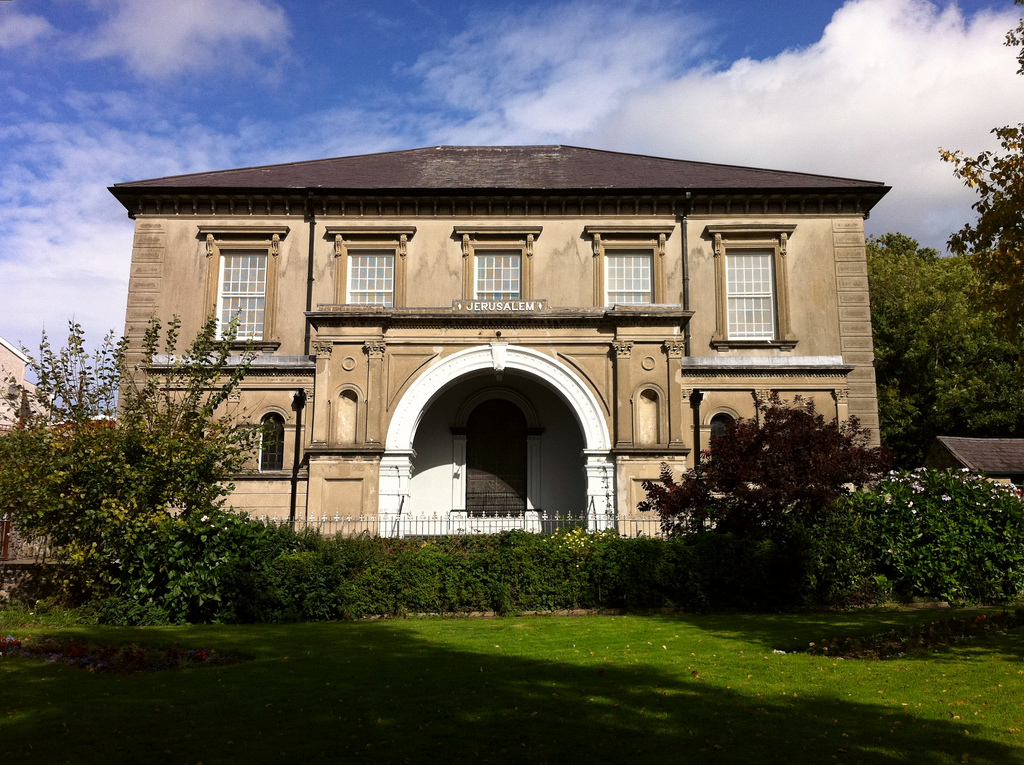
Capel Jerusalem

The architecture and layout of the town are largely utilitarian. Most of the buildings are constructed of stone with slate roofs. Some are constructed wholly of slate blocks, although such buildings tend to suffer from damp and structural slippage because the very flat and smooth surfaces of slate do not bind well to mortar.

The town has 40 Grade II listed buildings, including three pubs, in addition to the substantial and imposing Grade I listed Nonconformist Jerusalem Chapel

The upper parts of Carneddi, Cilfodan and Tan y Foel owe more to stone quarrying on the nearby hills rather than slate quarrying that supported the lower end of the town. At the eastern limits, the town is bounded by the rising land of the Carneddau mountains which form some of the more remote landscapes of Snowdonia. Much of Bethesda once consisted of discrete villages such as Gerlan, Rachub, Tregarth, Llanllechid and Braichmelyn; their names are retained as districts of the town.

== Religion ==
Bethesda is noted for the number of chapels (mostly dating from the 1904-1905 Welsh Revival) in the town. The town was named after the Bethesda Chapel, which was recently converted into residential flats.

== Commerce and industry ==
Llanllechid, on the outskirts of Bethesda, is the home of the Popty Bakery, the origins of which date back to the bakery opened by O. J. Williams in the early 1900s. The product range highlights Welsh cuisine, including Welsh cakes and Bara Brith.

== Language and culture ==
The dominant language of the town is Welsh and can be seen written and heard spoken in most settings. According to the United Kingdom Census 2001, 77.5% of the residents are Welsh-speaking (with some parts being over 80.0%+), higher than the average for both Gwynedd and Wales as a whole. In successive census returns (1901 and 1911) Bethesda had the highest percentage of Welsh speakers of its respective shire (Caernarfonshire) and of any district in Wales (with 1,500 monolingual Welsh speakers in 1901). The town is known colloquially as "Pesda" in the local Welsh dialect.

The S4C series Amdani! (a play on words that can mean "go for it!" and "about her") was based on a fictitious women's rugby team in Bethesda, and many of the location shots were filmed in the area. The series was based on the novel of the same name, by Bethan Gwanas, who lived in the town.

In June 2012 Tabernacl (Bethesda) Cyf., a non-profit co-operative based in the town was awarded a grant of around £1 million to renovate Neuadd Ogwen, a performance venue on the High Street. It was due to reopen as a community arts centre in June 2013.

In the 1970s and 1980s, Bethesda developed a reputation as a hub of musical creativity. Jam sessions and small home studios abounded alongside a burgeoning pub rock scene. As well as the now well-established 'Pesda Roc' festival, Bethesda has nurtured the Welsh language bands Celt, Maffia Mr Huws and experimentalists Y Jeycsyn Ffeif. In more recent years it continues to spring up bands from the local community such as Radio Rhydd.

== Gallery ==
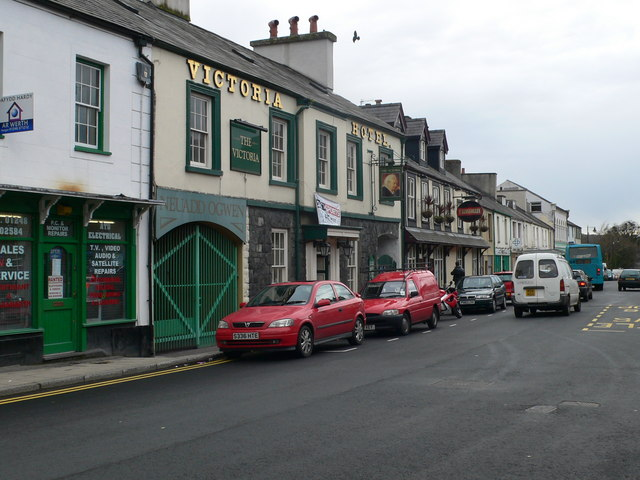
The A5 going through Bethesda.

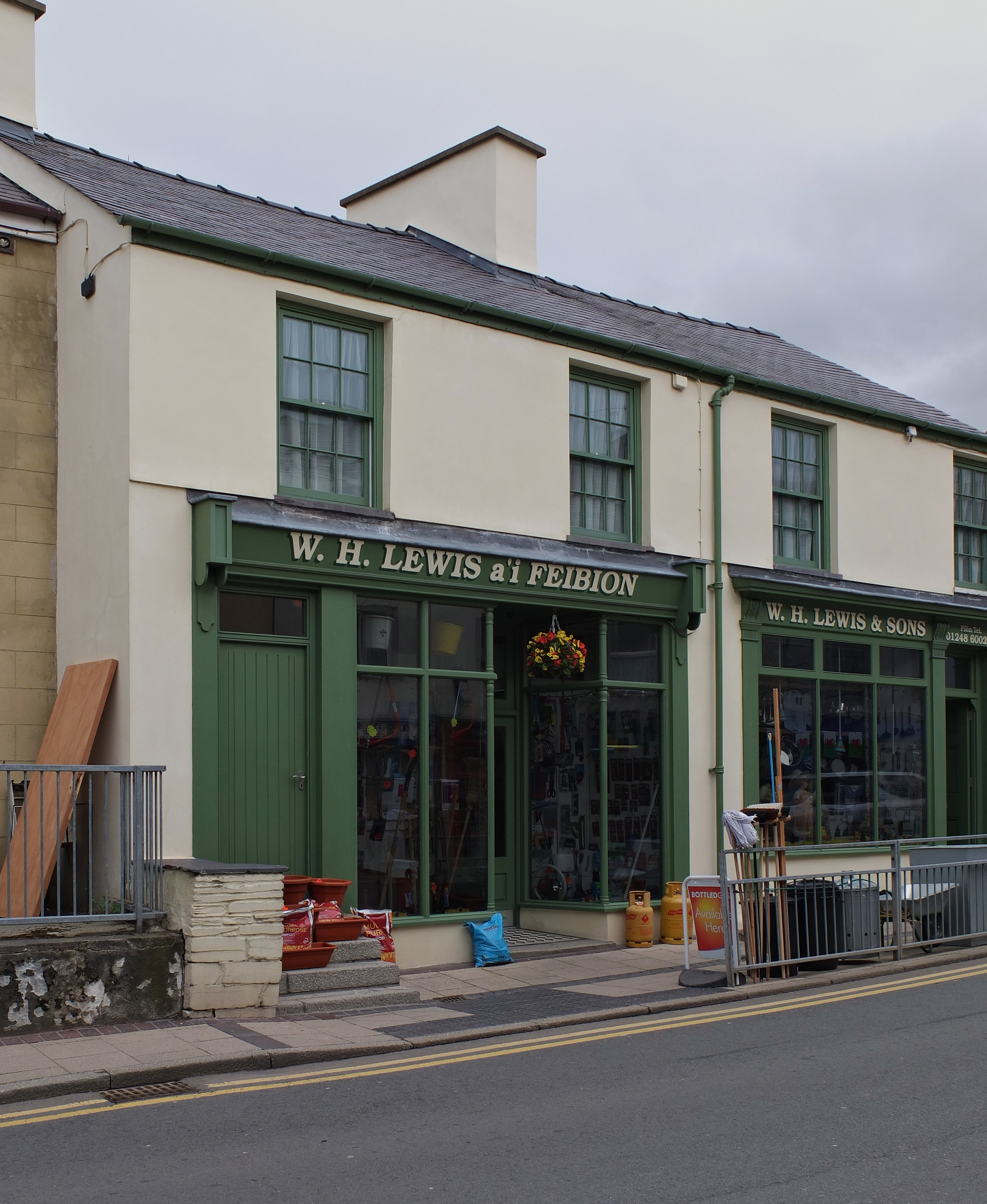
Hardware shop

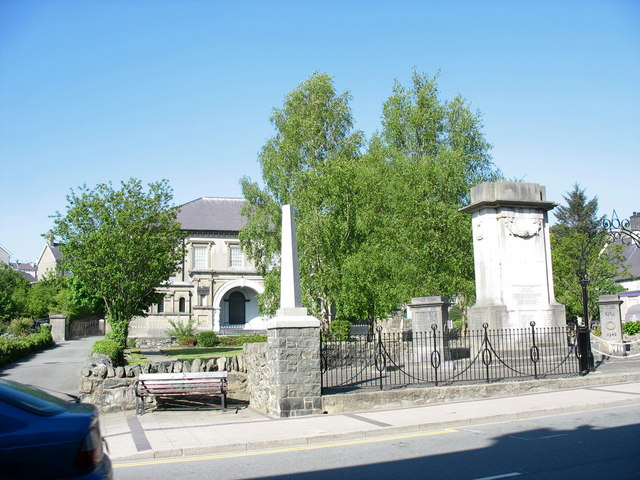
War memorial and Jerusalem Chapel, the biggest of the many chapels built in Bethesda during the Age of Slate.

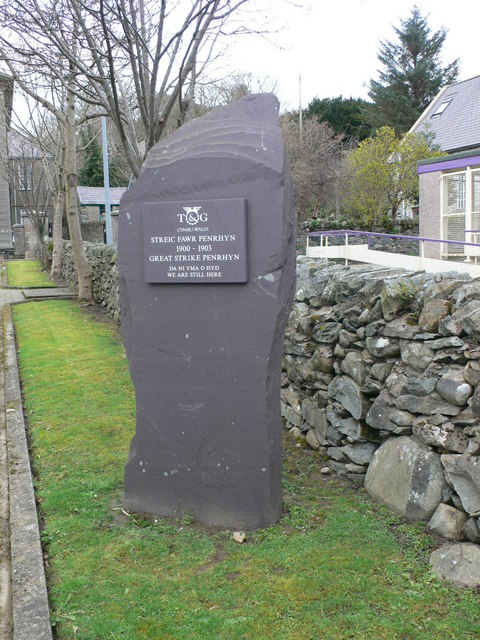
Jerusalem Chapel – slate memorial to commemorate the Strike at the Penrhyn Slate Quarry

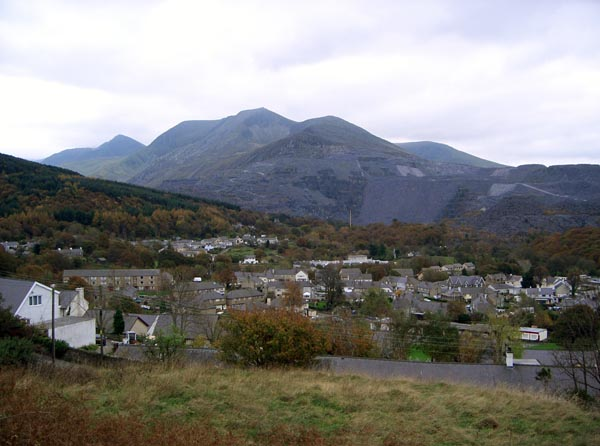
Bethesda & the Quarry in Winter.

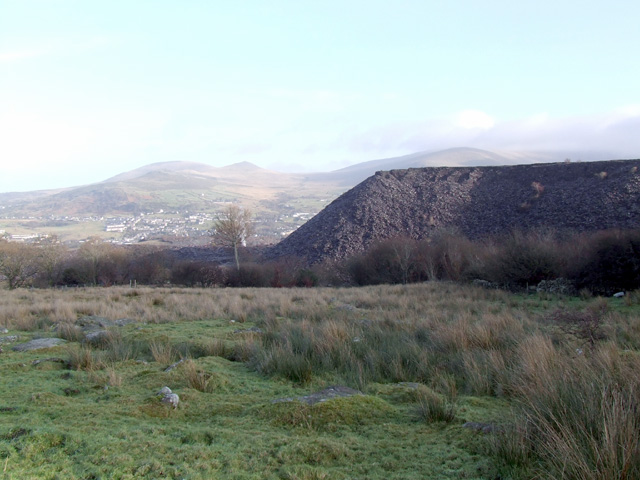
Slate tips on outer edges of Penrhyn Quarry at Mynydd Llandegai, with Bethesda in the distance

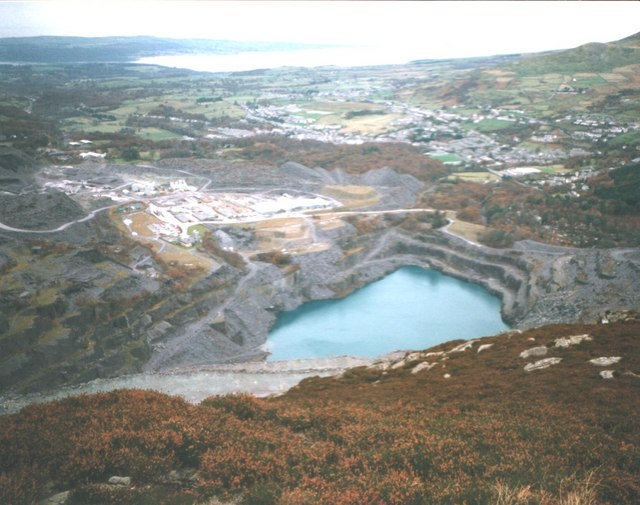
Flooded pit at the Penrhyn Quarry from Y Fronllwyd

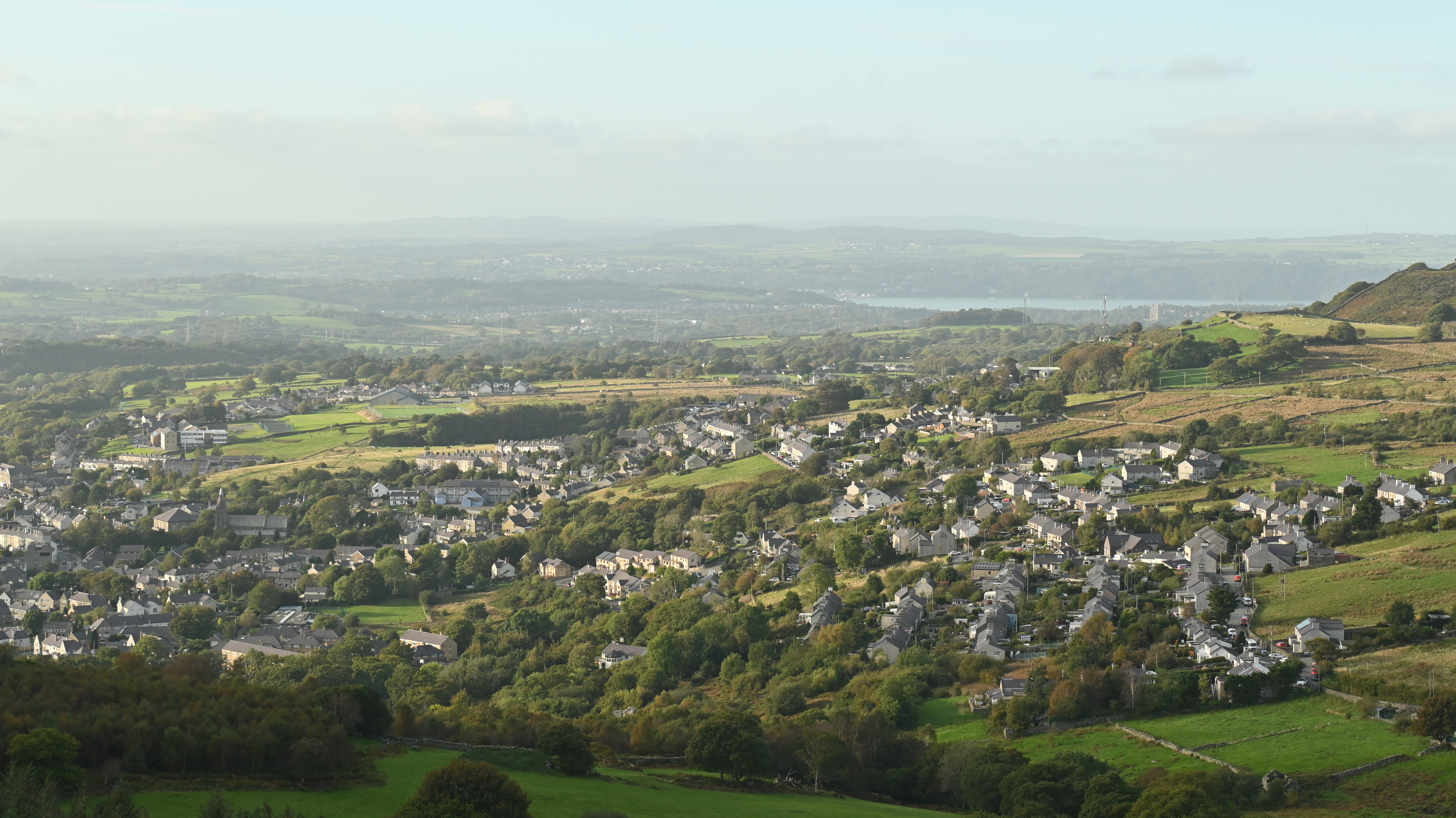
Bethesda, From the mountains in the South facing North towards Anglesey

== Notable people ==
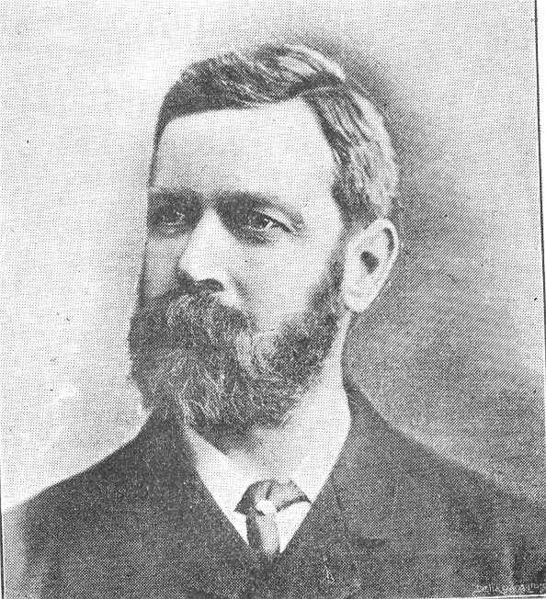
William John Parry, 1897

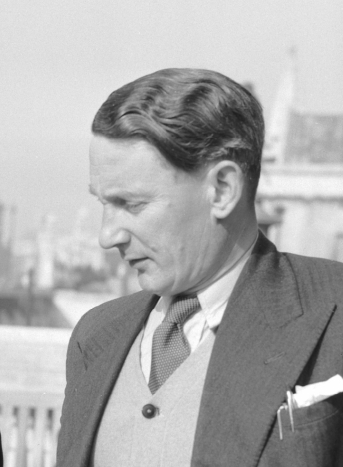
Goronwy Roberts, 1955

- Bobby Atherton (1876–1917), footballer with 135 club caps and 9 for Wales
- Richard Bell (1859–1930), politician and MP; formed North Wales Quarries Ltd. which owned three slate quarries in Bethesda
- Ellis Davies (politician) (1871–1939), politician and lawyer.
- Idris Foster (1911–1984), Jesus Professor of Celtic Studies at the University of Oxford
- David Ffrangcon-Davies (1855–1918), a Welsh operatic baritone.
- Bethan Gwanas (born 1962), author with an informal style of writing, lived and worked in Bethesda.
- Esyllt Harker (1947–2014), singer, actress and storyteller
- Tammy Jones (born 1944), singer
- Frederick Llewellyn-Jones (1866–1941), politician and MP
- Leila Megàne (1891–1960), a mezzo-soprano opera singer.
- John Ogwen (born 1944), actor, born in nearby Sling, now lives in Bangor
- Gwenlyn Parry (1932–1991), a dramatist and author of several plays in Welsh
- William John Parry (1842–1927) businessman, politician, author and first general secretary of the North Wales Quarrymen's Union.
- Peter Prendergast (1946–2007), Welsh landscape painter
- Caradog Prichard (1904–1980), Welsh novelist and poet, author of Un Nos Ola' Leuad
- Margaret Pritchard a former Welsh radio and TV broadcaster
- Goronwy Roberts, Baron Goronwy-Roberts (1913–1981), politician, MP and peer
- James Edmund Vincent (1857–1909), barrister, journalist and author

== See also ==
- Bethesda Branch Line
