= Jerusalem Chapel, Bethesda =

Chapel in Bethesda, Gwynedd, Wales

Coordinates: 53.18°N 4.0596°W

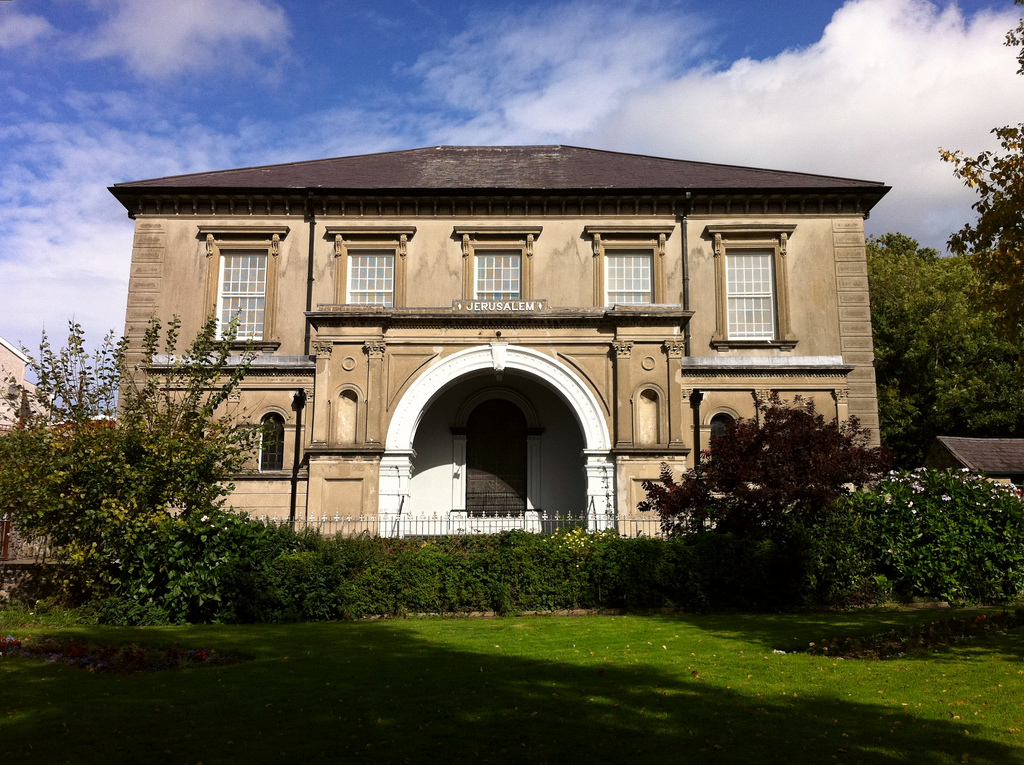
- "A chapel of remarkable scale and dignity"

- Location in Gwynedd
- OS grid reference: SH624667
- Location: Bethesda, Gwynedd
- Country: Wales
- Denomination: Presbyterian Church of Wales
- Website: Jerusalem Chapel website

History
- Founded: 1842–1843

Architecture
- Functional status: Active
- Heritage designation: Grade I
- Designated: 25 April 1997
- Architect(s): T. Evans (original building) and Richard Davies (rebuilding)
- Architectural type: Chapel
- Style: Italianate palazzo
- Groundbreaking: 1842–1843, 1872–1875 (rebuilding)

Jerusalem Chapel, Bethesda, Gwynedd, Wales is a Presbyterian Church of Wales chapel built in 1841–1842 and reconstructed in 1872–1875. Of colossal size, the chapel can accommodate 980 people in its horseshoe amphitheatre. Still an active chapel, it is a Grade I listed building.

== History ==
The original chapel was constructed in 1841–1842 by T. Evans of Bangor and rebuilt in 1872–1875 by Richard Davies. The cost of the original building was £3,400, and the rebuilding, £1,778. The chapel was constructed for the Calvinist Methodist community, a distinct Welsh branch of Methodism. In 1903 an organ was installed, having been purchased from Huddersfield Town Hall. The chapel remains an active place of worship for the Presbyterian Church of Wales. Daily services are conducted in Welsh.

== Architecture and description ==
The chapel is constructed in an Italianate palazzo style, described in the Gwynedd volume of the Buildings of Wales series as "more town hall than chapel". The chapel is large, of a nearly-square plan. The exterior is of stucco and the building is two storeys with a slate roof.

The interior forms a "horseshoe amphitheatre" capable of seating 980 people. The square plan of the exterior is concealed internally by a curved wall and the amphitheatre has a domed ceiling. The chapel is a Grade I listed building, its listing describing it as "a chapel of remarkable scale and dignity ...with a(n) interior of exceptional interest".
