= Bethan Gwanas =

Welsh-language author

Bethan Gwanas (pen name of Bethan Evans; born 16 January 1962) is a Welsh author, who publishes almost exclusively in the Welsh language. A prolific writer, she has had 17 titles published in the last decade. Whilst not just a fiction writer, she has written novels for teenagers and Welsh learners, though most of her recent work has been for adults.

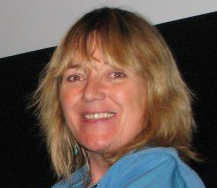
Bethan Gwanas

She graduated in French from Aberystwyth University, and in 1985 she won the Crown at the Urdd National Eisteddfod. Having lived for periods in places as diverse as Bethesda, Cardiff, Nigeria and France, she has returned to Rhydymain, very close to her childhood roots.

She grew up in Brithdir, near Dolgellau in North Wales, and on transferring to secondary school attended Ysgol y Gader, Dolgellau.

== Professional background ==
Before achieving success as an author, Gwanas worked as a teacher. She was deputy head at the Urdd Centre at Glan-llyn, near Bala, and also a research assistant and producer on Radio Cymru.

In 2003 she gave up her job as a literature promoter with Gwynedd Council to concentrate full-time on her writing.

Her second book, a factual account of her experiences whilst working with VSO in Nigeria, was published in 1997. Since then she has had work aired on radio and TV, and her first book Amdani! (Go for it!) – a novel about a women's rugby team – inspired six series on S4C. Gwanas wrote all but the last 3 series. Following the success of Amdani she also wrote a stage play (written with Script Cymru, and including music and songs), where the publicity describes it as "Sex, mud and rugby from a female perspective." For this, Script Cymru received a major ACW Audience Development Award for work in the Welsh language.

She has won two annual Tir na n-Og Awards for Welsh-language children's fiction (for Llinyn Trôns in 2001 and Sgôr in 2003). This prize is awarded annually by the Welsh Books Council.

Her novel Hi yw fy Ffrind (She is my friend) reached the shortlist for Llyfr y Flwyddyn (Book of the Year) in 2005.

She is known for her informal style of writing, and her adult novels often contain sexual elements not normally associated with Welsh literature. Her novels also draw on some of her own experiences, such as when she worked in a library (as does Blodwen Jones in that trilogy) and her experiences of outdoor education (featured in Llinyn Trôns).

She has also developed something of a reputation as a Welsh Michael Palin following her two S4C series Ar y Lein (On the Line) and Ar y Lein Eto (On the Line Again), in which she twice circumnavigated the world (though not continuously – she returned home during breaks in the filming). In the first series (2004) she followed line of latitude 52° north, the second series (2006) following line of longitude 5° west. These specific lines of latitude and longitude were chosen because they pass through Wales. At times her travels necessarily took her off these lines for geographical or political reasons, and on occasions variations were also made for the sake of interest. She kept a diary on both these trips, which were subsequently published to accompany the TV series.

For some years she has written a weekly column in Yr Herald Cymraeg, which is now published only on a Wednesday as an appendix to The Daily Post in North Wales. Some of these articles have also been published as compilations, namely as Byd Bethan (Bethan's World) and as Mwy o Fyd Bethan (More of Bethan's World).

Gwanas was one of 10 contributors to the book Y Mynydd Hwn (On This Mountain), published in 2002, also available in English. This is a volume of pictures and essays on the mountains of Wales. Gwanas writes about Cadair Idris, the mountain on her doorstep.

Gwanas regularly guests on S4C and Radio Cymru, and also at literary events and workshops throughout Wales. She has written work for radio, and also for the stage, including an adaptation of Stags and Hens (by Willy Russell) into Welsh for Fran Wen theatre company, and an adaptation (in English) of Peter Pan for primary schools through the BBC's education department.

When asked which three words best described her, she replied "Brwdfrydig, Prysur, Aflonydd" (enthusiastic, busy, restless).

She names her favourite Welsh-language authors as Gareth F. Williams, Manon Steffan Ros, Islwyn Ffowc Elis and Geraint V Jones, and her favourite English-language authors as Roddy Doyle, Isabel Allende, JK Rowling and Barbara Kingsolver.

In February 2009 she appeared in the second episode of Britain's Best Drives, talking about the Welsh language to the presenter, actor Richard Wilson, at Caernarfon.

== Bibliography ==
Title	Notes
Amdani! (1997) published under the name 'Bethan Evans'	written with the aid of a bursary from the Arts Council of Wales; spawned six TV series and a stage play
Dyddiadur Gbara (1997)	The diary of her 2 years in Nigeria with VSO.
Bywyd Blodwen Jones (1999)	the first in the Blodwen Jones trilogy; all 3 books are in the Nofelau Nawr series for adult Welsh learners
Llinyn Trôns (2000)	Tir na n-Og prize winner; now included on the Welsh GCSE syllabus as a "contemporary literary text"
Blodwen Jones a'r Aderyn Prin (2001)	the second book in the Blodwen Jones trilogy
Popeth am ... Gariad (2001)	a Welsh adaptation of "Coping with Love" by Peter Corey
Sgôr (2002)	co-written with a group of teenagers from Ysgol Dyffryn Teifi, Llandysul, after a competition was launched on the Uned 5 TV programme to find a group of young people to work with Gwanas on this "Nofel-T" project; Tir na n-Og prize winner.
Byd Bethan (2002)	compilation of newspaper column articles; also recorded by Gwanas as an RNIB Talking Book
Tri Chynnig i Blodwen Jones (2003)	the last book in the Blodwen Jones trilogy
Ceri Grafu (2003)	in the Pen Dafad series for teenagers
Gwrach y Gwyllt (2003)	written with the aid of a bursary from the Arts Council of Wales
Ar y Lein (2004)	accompanies the TV travel series
Hi yw fy Ffrind (2004)	reached the shortlist for Llyfr y Flwyddyn (Book of the Year) in 2005; in October 2007 it was additionally issued in a new format as a script, and containing activities for secondary school students at Key Stages 3 & 4.
Mwy o Fyd Bethan (2005)	second compilation of newspaper column articles
Pen Dafad (2005)	in the Pen Dafad series for teenagers
Hi oedd fy Ffrind (2006)	sequel to Hi yw fy Ffrind
Ar y Lein Eto (2006)	accompanies the 2nd TV travel series
Os Mêts (2007)	short novel in the Stori Sydyn (A Quick Read) series, a series aimed at adults who are not confident readers, or who find it difficult to open a book.
Y Gwledydd Bychain (2008)	another in the Stori Sydyn series; this is a more factual comparison of small countries – the Basque Country, Brittany, Norway and Wales, and a follow-up to her radio programmes on the subject.
Ar y Lein Eto Fyth (2008)	accompanies the 3rd TV travel series
Ramboy (2009)	an English adaptation of 'Pen Dafad', aimed at younger teenage boys
Dwy Stori Hurt Bost (2010)	aimed at young teenagers
Yn Ôl i Gbara (2010)	a sequel to "Dyddiadur Gbara", telling the story of her return visit to Africa. This was also the subject of a TV documentary.
Hanas Gwanas (2012)	an autobiography
Llwyth (2013)	in the Mellt (Lightning) series, a novel about four different tribes fighting for their identity, but who have to unite against a common enemy.
Bryn y Crogwr (2015)	another in the Stori Sydyn series; a semi-historical novel with links to Owain Glyndŵr
I Botany Bay (2015)	a fictional historical novel based on transportation to Australia
Coeden Cadi (2015)	an illustrated book for children, reading age 5 - 8
Cadi Dan y Dŵr (2017)	an illustrated book for children, reading age 5 - 8
Efa (2017)	the first in a trilogy called 'Cyfres y Melanai'
Y Diffeithwch Du (2018)	the second in the 'Cyfres y Melanai' series
Yn ei Gwsg (2018)	a story for Welsh learners
Edenia (2019)	the third in the 'Cyfres y Melanai' series
Cadi a'r Celtiaid (2019)	an illustrated book for children, reading age 5 - 8
Merch y Gwyllt (2020)	a sequel to Gwrach y Gwyllt
Cadi a'r Gwrachod (2021)	an illustrated book for children, reading age 5 - 8
Prawf Mot (2022)	the story of Mot, a dog, largely told by himself
Cadi a'r Môr-ladron (2022)	an illustrated book for children, reading age 5 - 8
Gladiatrix (2023)	a novel set in Roman times, the protagonist being a female gladiator

- Her short story Gwlad y Gwalltiau Gwyllt was published in Stori Cyn Cysgu (2005), a collection by nine authors and four illustrators of bedtime stories for young children. She also contributed a story to the sequel, Stori Cyn Cysgu: 2 (2008).
- She contributed two short stories to Tinboeth (2007), a collection of 10 erotic stories by nine prominent Welsh female authors. The book itself does not identify which stories were written by whom, and although Gwanas would have been happy to put her name to her work, not all the contributors were willing to do so. Although no credit is given in the book, she also acted as editor for this collection of stories. She edited the sequel, Tinboethach (2008), though did not contribute any stories to this.
- She contributed an item to Cofio Grav, a tribute volume of poems and essays to Ray Gravell, the Welsh rugby player, who died suddenly in 2007.
- She contributed to Honco! (2009), a compilation of stories for children aged 9–11.
- She contributed an item to Nain/Mam-gu (2010), a compilation about grandmothers.

The following table classifies her published titles by genre (listed in order of publication) :

novels for adults	novels for teenagers	novels for young children	novels for adult learners	non-fiction
Amdani!	Llinyn Trôns	Coeden Cadi	Bywyd Blodwen Jones	Dyddiadur Gbara
Gwrach y Gwyllt	[Popeth am ... Gariad]	Cadi Dan y Dŵr	Blodwen Jones a'r Aderyn Prin	Byd Bethan
Hi yw fy Ffrind	Sgôr	Cadi a'r Gwrachod	Tri Chynnig i Blodwen Jones	Ar y Lein
Hi oedd fy Ffrind	Ceri Grafu	Cadi a'r Celtiaid	Yn ei Gwsg	Mwy o Fyd Bethan
Os Mêts	Pen Dafad / Ramboy	Cadi a'r Môr-ladron		Ar y Lein Eto
Bryn y Crogwr	Dwy Stori Hurt Bost			Y Gwledydd Bychain
I Botany Bay	Gwyllt			Yn Ôl i Gbara
Merch y Gwyllt	Efa			Hanas Gwanas
Prawf Mot	Y Diffeithwch Du			
Gladiatrix	Edenia			

== Family background ==
Gwanas takes the name "Gwanas" (as did her father) from the home farm of that name, built in 1838.

Gwanas's grandparents lived at Gwanas from 1947 until 1971 when her grandfather decided to move to the nearby town of Dolgellau. In 1971, when she was nine, her parents moved in, having previously lived locally in Dolserau Terrace, Brithdir, and prior to that in a caravan behind the farm. As a child Gwanas shared the attic bedroom with her two sisters, the other bedrooms being used for bed & breakfast guests.

Her father, Tom Evans, a baritone, has twice won the Rhuban Glas (Blue Ribbon) at the National Eisteddfod, and has sung in venues across the world, including the Sydney Opera House. He has released two albums, entitled Ave Maria and Encore, which include songs recorded in a number of European languages.
