= Cronicl yr Ysgol Sabbothol =

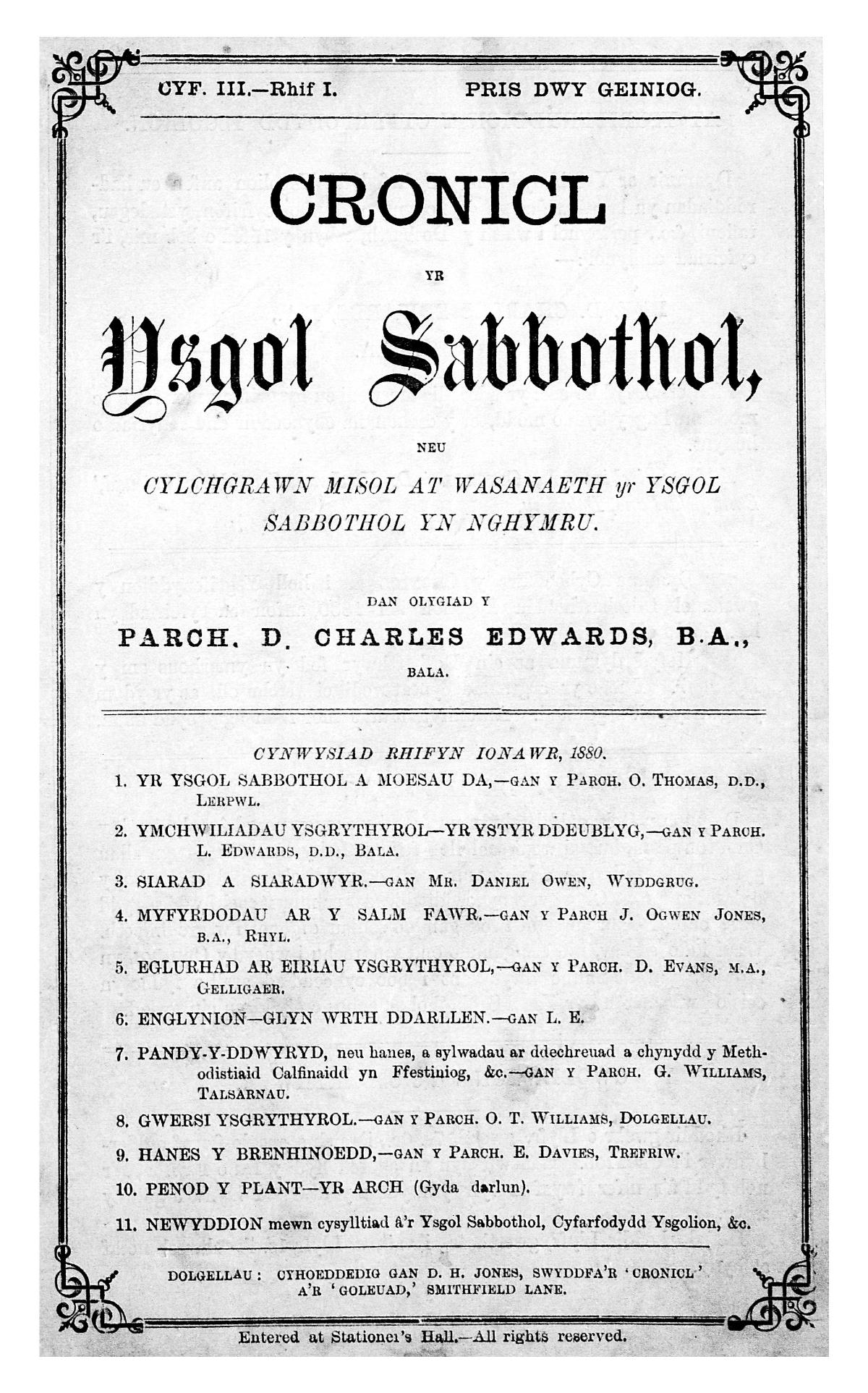
Cronicl yr Ysgol Sabbothol (Welsh Journal)

Cronicl yr Ysgol Sabbothol was a late 19th-century monthly Welsh-language periodical, published in Dolgellau by D. H. Jones (Swyddfa'r Goleuad). It contained mainly religious and news articles and music compositions aimed at Calvinistic Methodist denomination Sunday Schools. It was first edited by John Evans and John Jones (from 1878 until November 1879), later editors were David Charles Edwards (1826–1891) (until December 1881), Evan Davies (from August 1883 until February 1884), and music professor David Jenkins (1848–1915) (from 1880 until 1884). It ceased publication in 1884.
