= Presbyterian Church of Wales =

Welsh church denomination, formerly Calvinistic Methodists

- Modern logo of the Presbyterian Church of Wales
- Classification: Protestant
- Orientation: Reformed
- Theology: Calvinistic Methodist
- Polity: Presbyterian
- Moderator: Evan Morgan
- Associations: Cytûn, Churches Together in Britain and Ireland, Conference of European Churches, World Communion of Reformed Churches, Communion of Protestant Churches in Europe, World Council of Churches
- Region: Wales
- Origin: Formally separated from the Church of England in 1811 during the Welsh Methodist revival; Presbyterian Church of Wales formally established as an independent church in 1823.
- Separated from: Church of England
- Congregations: 471
- Members: 12,938
- Ministers: 45 plus 30 Christian workers
- Official website: www.ebcpcw.cymru

The Presbyterian Church of Wales (Welsh: Eglwys Bresbyteraidd Cymru), also known as the Calvinistic Methodist Church (Yr Eglwys Fethodistaidd Galfinaidd), is a denomination of Protestant Christianity based in Wales.

The Calvinistic Methodist movement has its origins in the 18th-century Welsh Methodist revival. The early movement was led principally by Welsh revivalist Daniel Rowland, who was influenced by the teachings of the Welsh Methodist leader Howell Harris and the theologian John Calvin. As such, Calvinistic Methodism places a strong emphasis on the sovereignty of God and the Calvinist doctrine of predestination.

The movement had a profound impact on Welsh society and culture, and it played a significant role in the Welsh revivals of the 19th century. Calvinistic Methodism formerly also had a significant presence in England, under the spiritual leadership of George Whitefield. Today, the large majority of the Presbyterian Church of Wales' congregations are in Wales (predominantly Welsh-speaking, but some English), but it also has a few local churches in the west of England (English-speaking).

== History ==
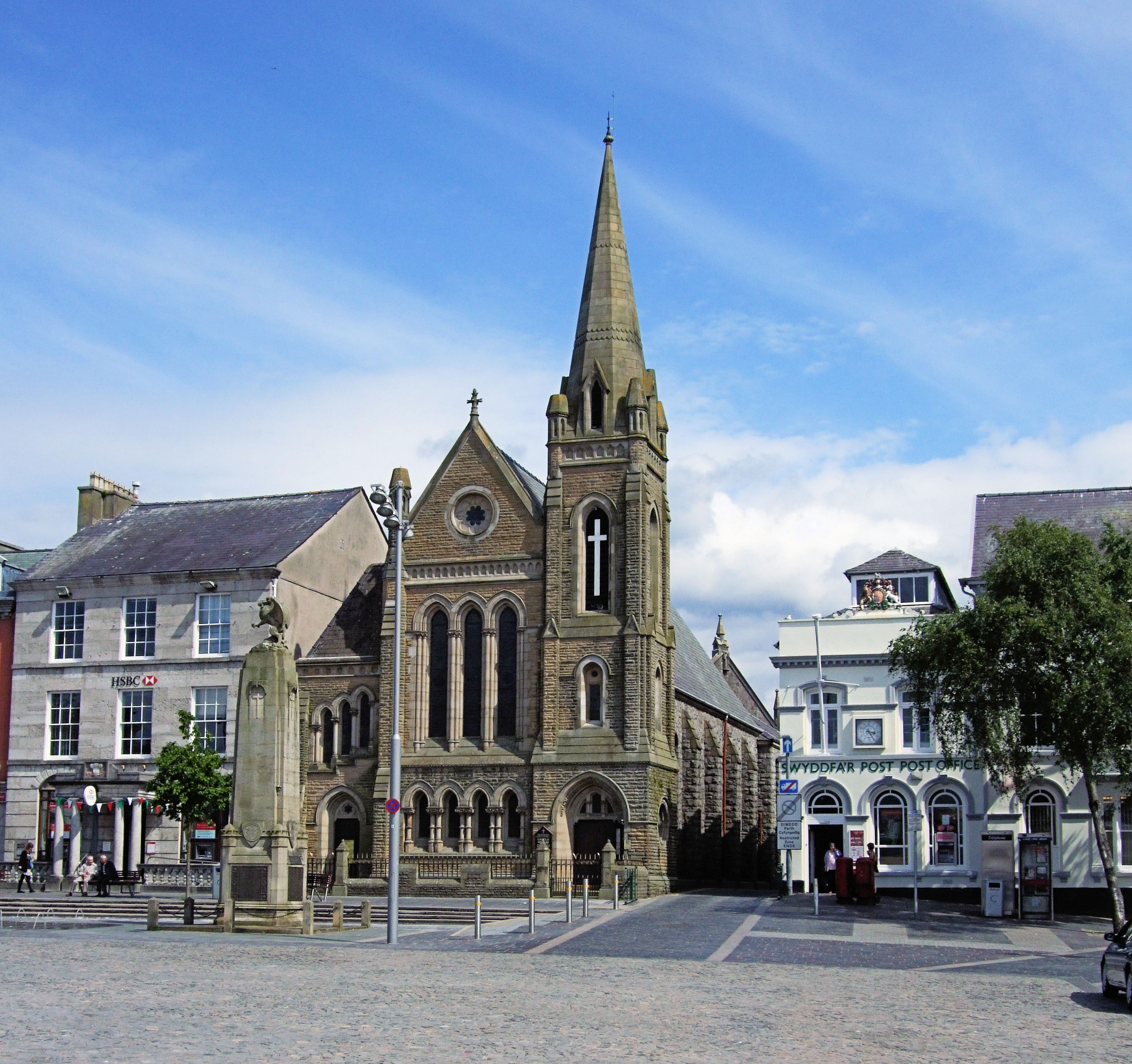
Castle Square Presbyterian Church, Caernarfon

The church was born as the Calvinistic Methodists out of the Welsh Methodist revival and the preaching of Howell Harris and Daniel Rowland in the 18th century and seceded from the Church of England in 1811. Calvinistic Methodism became a major denomination in Wales, growing rapidly in the 19th century, and taking a leadership role in the Welsh Religious Revival of 1904–05. In 1823, a Confession of Faith was created and adopted, based on the standard Westminster Confession. Theological colleges for ministerial training were opened in Bala, then in Merionethshire, now Gwynedd (1837), Trefeca, then in Brecknockshire, now Powys (1842), and Aberystwyth, in Ceredigion (1906). It produces a quarterly journal Y Traethodydd and a monthly periodical The Treasury. It is distinguished from other forms of Methodism by the Calvinistic nature of its theology. In 1840, the Foreign Missionary Society was formed in Liverpool to provide missionaries to India. It held its first general assembly in 1864.

Calvinistic Methodism claims to be the only Christian denomination in Wales to be of purely Welsh origin, and is rare among Presbyterian churches, by originating in the Methodist revival rather than deriving from the Calvinist Reformation. In 18th-century England, Calvinistic Methodism was represented by the followers of George Whitefield as opposed to those of John and Charles Wesley, although all the early Methodists in England and Wales worked together, regardless of Calvinist or Arminian (or Wesleyan) theology, for many years. With Calvinistic Methodists being absorbed into Presbyterianism, Methodism became defined by its adherence to Wesleyan-Arminian theology.

=== Beginnings ===
The movement's beginnings may be traced to the Rev. Griffith Jones (1684–1761), Church of England rector of Llanddowror, Carmarthenshire, whose sympathy for the poor led him to set on foot a system of circulating charity schools for the education of children. Griffith Jones's zeal, which contrasted strikingly with the general apathy of the clergy of the period, appealed to the public imagination, and his powerful preaching exercised a widespread influence. Many travelled long distances in order to attend his ministry. There was thus a considerable number of earnest people dispersed throughout the country waiting for the rousing of the parish clergy.

=== Daniel Rowland and Howell Harris ===
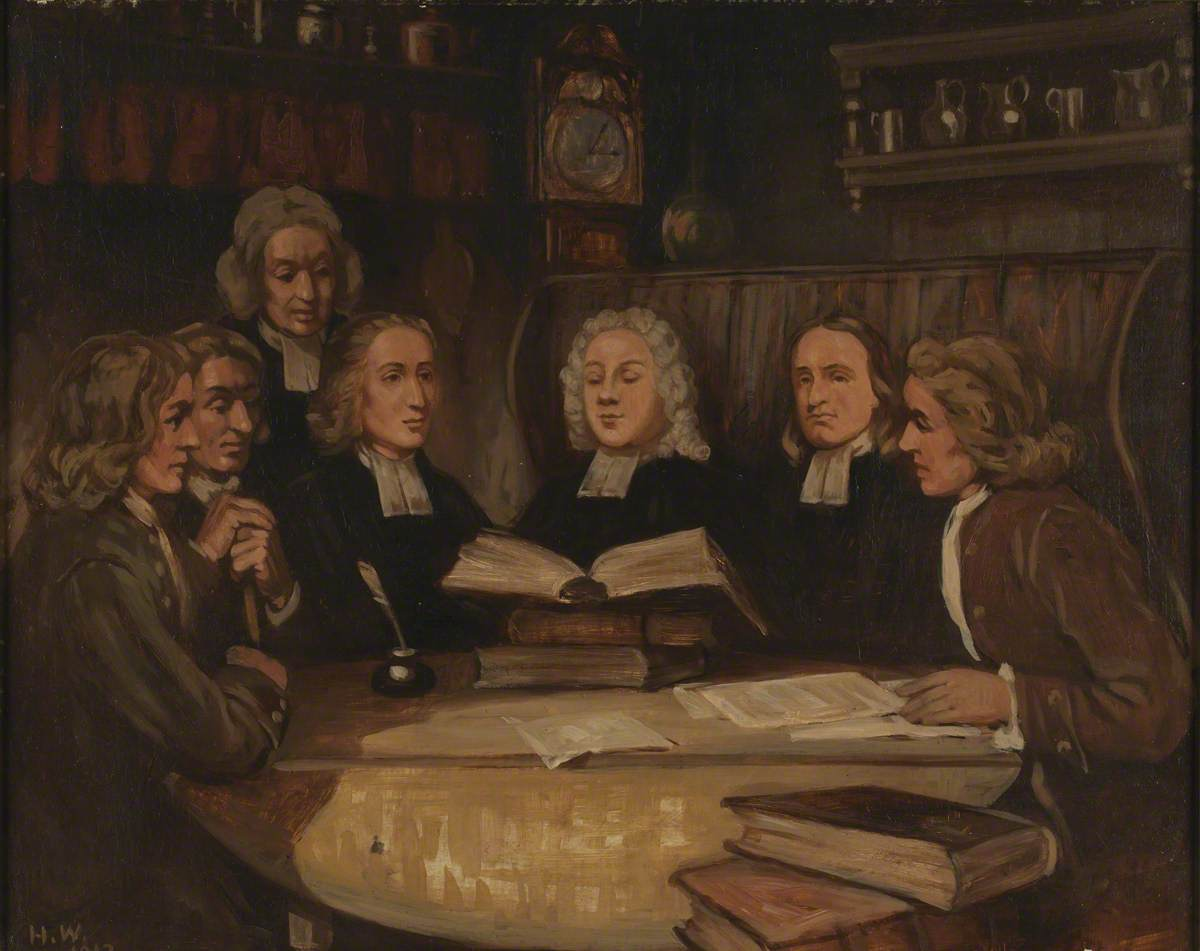
Artist's impression of the first Methodist association in 1743

Griffith Jones, preaching at Llanddewi Brefi, Cardiganshire, found Daniel Rowland (1713–1790), curate of Llangeitho, in his audience, and his patronising attitude in listening drew from the preacher a personal supplication on his behalf in the middle of the discourse. Rowland was deeply moved, and became an ardent apostle of the new movement. Naturally a fine orator, his new-born zeal gave an edge to his eloquence and his fame spread abroad.

In May 1735, Howell Harris (1714–1773) underwent a religious conversion after listening to a sermon at Talgarth on the necessity of partaking of Holy Communion. This led to several weeks of self-examination and reached a climax at Communion on Whitsunday, May 1735. He immediately began to hold meetings in his own home, encouraging others to seek the same assurance that he had of Christ's forgiveness, and was soon invited to do the same at the houses of others. He became a fiery itinerant preacher, stirring to the depths every neighbourhood he visited. Harris' eldest brother sent him to Oxford in the autumn of 1735 where his friends hoped he "should be effectually cured of [his] 'enthusiasm', as they called it", but he left in the following February.

In 1736, on returning home, Harris opened a school, Griffith Jones supplying him with books from his charity. He also set up societies, in accordance with the recommendations in Josiah Wedgwood's little book on the subject; and these exercised a great influence on the religious life of the people. By far the most notable of Harris's converts was William Williams of Pantycelyn (1717–1791), the famous hymn-writer of Wales, who while listening to the revivalist preaching on a tombstone in the graveyard of Talgarth, felt he was "apprehended as by a warrant from on high". He was ordained deacon in the Church of England, 1740, but George Whitefield recommended him to leave his curacies in order to preach on highways and hedges.

Rowlands and Harris had been at work fully eighteen months before they met in 1737 at a service in Devynock church in the upper part of Breconshire. The acquaintance then formed lasted to the end of Harris's life.

In January 1743, Whitefield chaired a meeting at Plas Watford near Caerphilly, Glamorgan, attended by Rowland, Williams, Harris, John Humphreys, John Powell — afterwards of Llanmartin – and a layman called John Cennick. They met in order to organise their societies. Seven lay exhorters were also at the meetings; they were questioned as to their spiritual experience and allotted their several spheres; other matters pertaining to the new conditions created by the revival were arranged. This is known as the first Methodist Association, held eighteen months before John Wesley's first conference (June 25, 1744).

Monthly meetings covering smaller districts, were organised to consider local matters, the transactions of which were to be reported to the Quarterly Association, to be confirmed, modified, or rejected. Exhorters were divided into two classes — public, who were allowed to itinerate as preachers and superintend a number of societies; and private, who were confined to the charge of one or two societies. The societies were distinctly understood to be part of the Church of England and every attempt at estranging them from the Church was reproved; but persecution made their position anomalous. They did not accept the discipline of the Church of England, so the plea of conformity was a feeble defence; nor had they taken out licenses, so as to claim the protection of the Toleration Act. Harris's ardent loyalty to the Church of England, after three refusals to ordain him, and his personal contempt for ill-treatment from persecutors, were the only things that prevented separation.

A controversy on a doctrinal point "Did God die on Calvary?" raged for some time, the principal disputants being Rowlands and Harris; and in 1751 it ended in an open rupture, which threw the Connexion first into confusion and then into a state of coma. The societies split up into Harrisites and Rowlandites, and it was only with the revival of 1762 that the breach was fairly repaired. This revival is a landmark in the history of the Connexion.

William Williams Pantycelyn had just published (1744) a little volume of hymns entitled Aleluia, the singing of which inflamed the people. This led the Bishop of St. David's to suspend Rowlands's licence, and Rowlands had to confine himself to a meeting-house at Llangeitho. Having been turned out of other churches, he had leased a plot of land in 1759, anticipating the final withdrawal of his license, in 1763, and a spacious building was erected to which the people crowded from all parts on Sacrament Sunday. Llangeitho became the centre of Welsh Methodism; and Rowland's popularity never waned until his physical powers gave way.

=== Peter Williams and Thomas Charles ===
A notable event in the history of Welsh Methodism was the publication in 1770, of a 4th annotated Welsh Bible by the Rev. Peter Williams, a forceful preacher and an indefatigable worker, who had joined the Methodists in 1746 after being driven from several curacies. It gave birth to a new interest in Scripture, being the first definite commentary in the language. A powerful revival broke out at Llangeitho in the spring of 1780 and spread to the south but not to the north of Wales.

In North Wales, the Rev. Thomas Charles (1755–1814) became a major figure. Having spent five years in Somerset as curate of several parishes, Charles returned to his native North Wales to marry Sarah Jones of Bala. Failing to find employment in the established church, he joined the Methodists in 1784. His circulating charity schools and then his Sunday schools gradually made the North a new country. In 1791 a revival began at Bala, a few months after the Bala Association had been ruffled by the proceedings which led to the expulsion of Peter Williams from the Connection, in order to prevent him from selling John Canne's Bible among the Methodists, because of some Sabellian marginal notes.

In 1790 the Bala Association passed rules regarding the proper mode of conducting the Quarterly Association, drawn up by Charles; in 1801, Charles and Thomas Jones of Mold, published (for the association) the Rules and Objects of the Private Societies among the People called Methodists. About 1795, persecution led the Methodists to take the first step towards separation from the Church of England. Heavy fines made it impossible for preachers in poor circumstances to continue without claiming the protection of the Toleration Act, and the meeting-houses had to be registered as dissenting chapels. In a large number of cases this had only been delayed by so constructing the houses that they were used both as dwellings and as chapels at one and the same time. Until 1811 the Calvinistic Methodists had no ministers ordained by themselves; their enormous growth in numbers and the scarcity of ministers to administer the Sacrament — only three in North Wales, two of whom had joined only at the dawn of the century made the question of ordination a matter of urgency. The South Wales clergy who regularly itinerated were dying out; the majority of those remaining itinerated but irregularly, and were most of them against the change. The lay element, with the help of Charles and a few other stalwarts, carried the matter through ordaining nine at Bala in June, and thirteen at Llandilo in August. In 1823, the Confession of Faith of the Connextion of Calvinistic Methodists in Wales was published following the Association meetings in Aberystwyth and Bala that year; it is based on the Westminster Confession as Calvinistically construed, and contains 44 articles. The Connection's Constitutional Deed was formally completed in 1826 and tied all its property to the ascension to its Confession of Faith.

=== Trevecca College ===
Thomas Charles had tried to arrange for taking over Trevecca College when the trustees of the Countess of Huntingdon's Connexion removed their seminary to Cheshunt in 1791; but the Bala revival broke out just at the time, and, when things grew quieter, other matters pressed for attention. A college had been mooted in 1816, but the intended tutor died suddenly, and the matter was for the time dropped. Candidates for the Connexional ministry were compelled to shift for themselves until 1837, when Lewis Edwards (1809–1887) and David Charles (1812–1878) opened a school for young men at Bala. North and South alike adopted it as their college, the associations contributing a hundred guineas each towards the education of their students. In 1842, the South Wales Association opened a college at Trevecca, leaving Bala to the North; the Rev. David Charles became principal of the former, and the Rev. Lewis Edwards of the latter. After the death of Lewis Edwards, T. C. Edwards resigned the principalship of the University College at Aberystwyth to become head of Bala (1891), now a purely theological college, the students of which were sent to the university colleges for their classical training. In 1905, David Davies of Llandinam, one of the laymen in the Connection, offered a large building at Aberystwyth as a gift to the denomination for the purpose of uniting North and South in one theological college; but in the event of either association declining the proposal, the other was permitted to take possession, giving the association that should decline the option of joining at a later time. The Association of the South accepted, and that of the North declined, the offer; Trevecca College was turned into a preparatory school on the lines of a similar institution set up at Bala in 1891.

=== Missions ===
The missionary collections of the denomination were given to the London Missionary Society from 1798 to 1840, when a Connectional Society was formed; and no better instances of missionary enterprise are known than those of the Khasi and Jaintia Hills, Lushai Hills (Mizoram) and the Plains of Sylhet in northern India. The Presbyterian Church of India is the result of this missionary activity. There had also been a mission in Brittany since 1842.

=== Constitution ===
The constitution of the denomination (called in Welsh, Hen Gorff, i.e. the "Old Body" because, at its formation in 1811 issuing from the Anglican Church, it was an established 'body' or Connexion of believers with roots hailing back to the Methodist Revival), is a mixture of Presbyterianism and Congregationalism; each particular society constituted themselves to be churches and manage its own affairs and were to report (I) to the district meeting, (2) to the monthly meeting, the nature of each report determining its destination. The monthly meetings (known now as Presbytery meetings) were, and continue to be made up of all the officers of the churches comprised in each, and are split up into districts for the purpose of a more local co-operation of the churches. The monthly meetings appointed delegates to the quarterly Associations (now bi-annually), of which all officers are members. The Associations of North and South are distinct institutions, deliberating and determining matters pertaining to them in their separate gatherings. For the purpose of a fuller cooperation in matters common to both, a general assembly, which meets once a year, was established in 1864. This is a purely deliberative conclave, worked by committees, and all its decisions have to be confirmed by the Association meeting in its three provinces before it can have any force. The annual conference of the English churches of the denomination had no decision-making power, and was meant for social and spiritual intercourse and discussion until 1944, when the Association in the East was established with equal standing, forming, together with the North and the South, one Association in three provinces.

=== Turn of the century ===
The Calvinistic Methodists formed in some respects the strongest church in Wales, and its Forward Movement, headed by Dr. John Pugh of Cardiff, brought thousands into its fold since its establishment in 1891. Its Connexional Book Room, opened in 1891, yielded an annual profit (at the time) of from £1,600 to £2,000, the profits being devoted to help the colleges and to establish Sunday school libraries, etc. Its chapels in 1907 numbered 1,641 (with accommodation for 488,080), manses 229; its churches numbered 1,428, ministers 921, unordained preachers 318, elders 6,179; its Sunday Schools 1,731, teachers 27,895, scholars 193,460, communicants 189,164, total collections for religious purposes 300,912. The statistics of the Indian Mission (at the time, known now as The Presbyterian Church of India) were equally good: communicants 8,027, adherents 26,787, missionaries 23, native ministers (ordained) 15, preachers (not ordained) 60, and have continued to grow ever since.

According to the Encyclopædia Britannica Eleventh Edition:

The Calvinistic Methodists are intensely national in sentiment and aspirations, beyond all suspicion loyalists. They take a great interest in social, political and educational matters, and are on public bodies. They support the Eisteddfod as the promoter and inspirer of arts, letters and music, and are conspicuous among the annual prize winners. They thus form a living, democratic body, flexible and progressive in its movements, yet with a sufficient proportion of conservatism both in religion and theology to keep it sane and safe.

The origins of the Presbyterian Church in Wales arose out of a series of revivals across the country, and at the beginning of the 20th century, the last major Welsh revival took place during 1904-1905. This helped to increase the number of members and adherents in the denomination to its highest level, approaching 350,000 people in those years, around 17% - 20% of the Welsh population at the time.

=== Presbyterian Church in Wales ===
In 1928 it officially adopted the name Presbyterian Church in Wales but still retained the name Welsh Calvinistic Methodism with equal standing. In 1933 its constitution was modified as a result of the Presbyterian Church in Wales Act of Parliament in 1933, receiving Royal assent. In 1947 the Association in the East was established for English-speaking churches. In 1978 Pamela Turner became the first woman to be ordained as a minister. In 2004 the central office moved to Whitchurch, Cardiff. In 2007 new boundaries and structures was adopted for presbyteries.

== Statistics ==
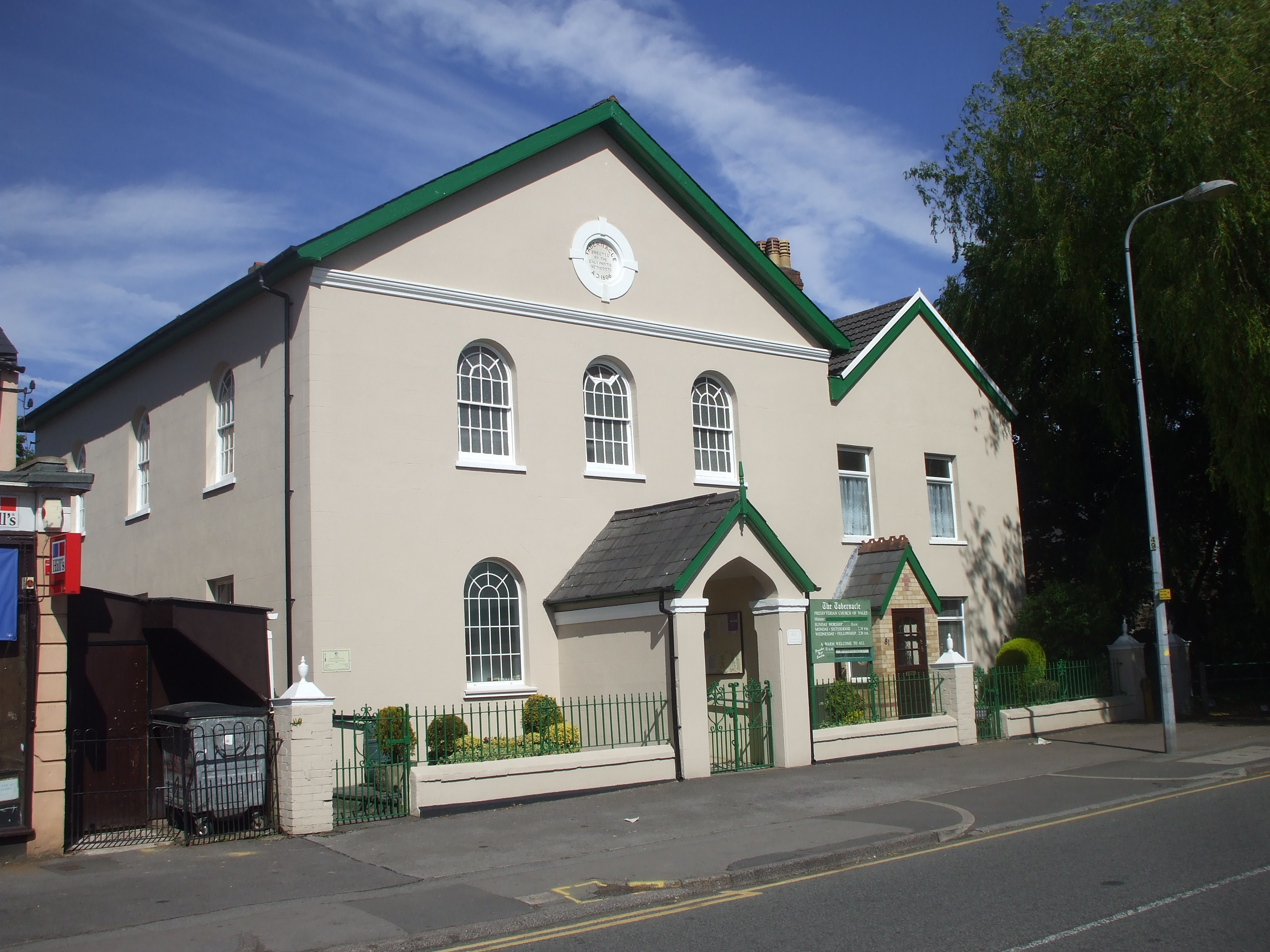
Tabernacle, Whitchurch, Cardiff

As of statistics recorded in June 2022, the Presbyterian Church of Wales has around 12,938 members who worship in around 471 churches. It is estimated that because of continued decline, the Church of Wales may be extinct by 2033, as decline which has been taking place since 1905 is still progressing.

Most of these churches are in Wales, but due to strong historical links between the Welsh and certain English cities, there are churches using both the English and the Welsh languages in London, Manchester, Birmingham, Coventry and Liverpool. Churches belong to one of eighteen Presbyteries, grouped into three Provinces, the Association in the South, the Association in the North (Welsh language), and the Association in the East (English language), along with a General Assembly.

The Church offices are located at the Tabernacle Church, 81, Merthyr Road, Whitchurch, Cardiff CF14 1DD.

Since the peak membership in the early 20th century, the denomination has continued to decline, now representing only about 3% of its highest membership figures. The decline was very steep after the First World War, only slowing after 1980. Between 2015 and 2020, it suffered an annual membership loss about 6%.

== Social issues ==
The church is active in discussing social issues within Wales.

In 2013, the denomination responded to a consultation on blessing same-sex unions. In response, it decided not to have an official doctrine on the matter, allowing each local congregation to have its own practice regarding whether or not to bless same-sex unions. This position led to a protest from some of its members and the resignation of officials of the denomination, who saw, in this decision, the permission for the celebration of marriages between people of the same sex.

The church has ordained women as ministers since 1978.

== Presbyteries and chapels ==
| Presbytery | Churches |
|---|---|
| Môn / Anglesey (Welsh) | Aberffraw, Bethesda (Amlwch), Capel y Drindod (Beaumaris), Benllech, Gad Newydd (Bodffordd), Bethel (Bodorgan), Beulah (Bodorgan), Hebron (Bryngwran), Rehoboth (Burwen), Brynrefail, Horeb (Brynsiencyn), Ty Mawr (Capel Coch), Engedi (Ceirchiog), Bethesda (Cemaes), Siloam (Cemlyn), Disgwylfa (Gaerwen), Bethlehem (Garreglefn), Jerwsalem (Gwalchmai), Eglwys Unedig Hyfrydle (Holyhead), Newry Street Presbyterian Church (Holyhead), Paradwys (Llanallgo), Glasinfryn (Llanbedrgoch), Peniel (Llanddona), Barachïa (Llandegfan), Seion (Llandrygan), Abarim (Llanfachraeth), Ty'n y Maen (Llanfachraeth), Eglwys Unedig Rhos-y-Gad (Llanfairpwllgwyngyll), Bethania (Llangaffo), Lôn y Felin (Llangefni), Moreia (Llangefni), Capel Ty Rhys (Llangoed), Horeb (Llangristiolus), Gosen (Llangwyllog), Carmel (Llannerch-y-medd), Parc (Llannerch-y-medd), Bethel Hen (Llanrhuddlad), Capel Mawr (Menai Bridge), Jerwsalem (Mynydd Mechell), Ebeneser (Newborough), Penygarnedd, Pengarnedd (Rhosgoch), Paran (Rhosneigr), Cana (Rhostrehwfa), Gorslwyd (Rhos-y-bol), Capel Nyth Clyd (Talwrn), Eglwys Unedig Noddfa (Trearddur Bay)^{B}, Dothan (Ty Croes), Tabor (Y Fali) |
| Arfon (Welsh) | Bethania (Abergwyngregyn), Berea Newydd (Bangor), Eglwys y Cysegr (Bethel), Eglwys Unedig Jerwsalem (Bethesda), Brynrefail^{closed 2020}, Caeathro, Noddfa (Caernarfon), Seilo (Caernarfon), Carmel^{closed 2021}, Ebeneser (Clynnog)^{closed 2023}, Cefnywaun (Deiniolen), Capel Coch (Llanberis), Bwlan (Llandwrog), Horeb (Llanfairfechan), Capel y Rhos (Llanrug), Glanrhyd (Llanwnda), Baladeulyn (Nantlle), Peniel (Nantmor), Eglwys y Berth (Penmaenmawr), Capel y Groes (Penygroes), Brynaerau (Pontllyfni), Horeb (Rhostryfan), Eglwys y Waun (Waunfawr), Bethania (Y Felinheli) |
| Gorllewin Gwynedd / West Gwynedd (Welsh) | Deunant (Aberdaron), Uwchmynydd (Aberdaron), Capel Isaf (Abererch), Abergeirw, Capel Ty'n Ddôl (Abergynolwyn), Y Graig (Abersoch), Caersalem (Barmouth), Christ Church (Barmouth), Y Bowydd (Blaenau Ffestiniog), Rhydbach (Botwnnog), Bryncir, Ty Mawr (Bryncroes), Brynengan, Capel Uchaf (Chwilog), Capel y Traeth (Criccieth), Cwm Prysor, Capel Salem (Dolgellau), Horeb (Dyffryn Ardudwy), Edern, Capel Berea (Efailnewydd), Jerwsalem (Garndolbenmaen), Garnfadryn, Maentwrog Uchaf (Gellilydan), Bethel (Golan), Y Babell (Llanaelhaearn), Capel y Ddôl (Llanbedr), Peniel Newydd (Llanbedrog), Peniel Newydd (Llanegryn), Smyrna (Llangian), Dinas (Llaniestyn), Llithfaen, Llwyndyrus, Bethesda (Manod), Moreia (Morfa Nefyn), Capel Isaf (Nefyn), Libanus (Pantglas), Pencaenewydd, Pennal, Bethel (Penrhos), Nasareth (Penrhyndeudraeth), Pentreuchaf, Capel y Porth (Porthmadog), Ala Road Presbyterian Church (Pwllheli), Capel y Drindod (Pwllheli), Salem (Sarn Meyllteyrn), Moreia (Trawsfynydd), Peniel (Tremadog), Tudweiliog, Bethel (Tywyn), Ebeneser (Y Ffôr) |
| Conwy a Dyfrdwy / Conwy and Dee (Welsh) | Capel Tegid (Bala), Llidiardau (Bala), Parc (Bala), Capel y Gro (Betws Gwerfyl Goch), Bryn Mawr (Betws y Coed), Seion (Capel Garmon), Seion (Carrog), Cefnddwysarn, Jerwsalem (Cerrigydrudion), Carmel (Conwy)^{closed 2022}, Tal-y-bont (Conwy), Eglwys Unedig Seion a Bryneglwys (Corwen), Ty Mawr (Cwmpenanner), Cwmtirmynach, Cynllwyd, Bethel (Cynwyd), Peniel (Deganwy), Dinmael, Moreia (Dolwyddelan), Salem (Efail Uchaf), Eglwysbach, Glan-yr-afon, Cefnbrith (Glasfryn), Moriah (Gwyddelwern), Hermon (Llandrillo), Eglwys Unedig Seilo (Llandudno)^{BIM}, Pensarn (Llandudno Junction), Maes yr Odyn (Llanfihangel Glyn Myfyr), Capel y Cwm (Llangernyw), Cefn Nannau (Llangwm), Heol Scotland (Llanrwst), Seion (Llanrwst), Bryn Ebeneser (Llansantffraid), Glanaber (Llanuwchllyn), Tabernacl (Llechwedd), Bethel (Melin y Coed), Cynfal (Melin y Wig), Hebron (Old Colwyn), Padog, Pandy Tudur, Eglwys Unedig (Penmachno), Rhosygwalia, Talybont (Rhyduchaf), Capel y Rhos (Rhos on Sea), Peniel (Trefriw), Ty'n y Groes, Seion (Y Ro-wen), Seion (Ysbyty Ifan) |
| Dyffryn Clwyd / Vale of Clwyd (Welsh) | Mynydd Seion (Abergele), Hyfrydle (Betws-yn-Rhos), Capel y Waen (Bodfari), Bontuchel, Capel y Brwcws (Brookhouse), Bethel (Caerwys), Cefn Meiriadog, Cefnberain, Clawdd Newydd, Salem (Cyffylliog), Capel Mawr a Seion (Denbigh), Y Fron (Denbigh), Derwen, Bethel (Diserth), Gellifor, Groes, Henllan, Capel y Dyffryn (Llandyrnog), Salem (Llanfair Dyffryn Clwyd), Soar (Llanfair Talhaearn), Tabor (Llanfair Talhaearn), Llannefydd, Capel y Pentre (Llanrhaeadr), Capel y Glyn (Llanrhaeadr), Capel Coffa Henry Rees (Llansannan), Nantglyn, Peniel, Bethel (Pentrecelyn), Rehoboth (Prestatyn), Prion, Eglwys Unedig y Rhiw (Pwllglas), Rhewl, Ebeneser (Rhuddlan), Clwyd Street (Rhyl), Bethania (Ruthin), Tabernacl (Ruthin), Saron, Bethlehem Unedig (St Asaph), Salem (Towyn), Trefnant |
| Gogledd Ddwyrain / North East (Welsh) | Altrincham, St John Street (Chester), Bethesda (Chirk), Capel Gad (Cilcain), Disgwylfa (Coedpoeth), Bethesda (Cymau), Caersalem (Flint), Soar (Glyn Ceiriog), Bethania (Waterloo, Liverpool), Bethel (Liverpool), Capel y Berthen (Lixwm), Tabernacl (Llanarmon Dyffryn Ceiriog), Bethel (Llanarmon-yn-Iâl), Bethania (Llandegla), Noddfa (Oaker Avenue, Manchester), Bethesda (Mold), Bethel (Nant y Fflint), Soar (Nercwys), Seion (Penbedw), Gwynfa (Penyffordd), Bethel (Ponciau), Capel Mawr (Rhosllanerchrugog), Capel Penbryn (Treffynnon), Carmel (Treffynnon), Capel y Rhos (Treuddyn), Capel y Groes (Wrexham) |
| Trefaldwyn / Montgomery (Welsh) | Capel Coffa Lewis Evan a Charmel (Adfa), Bethel (Birmingham), Eglwys Gymraeg (Coventry), Hermon (Cymdu), Capel Coffa Ann Griffiths (Dolanog), Sardis (Dolanog), Y Bont (Llanbrynmair), Gosen (Llanerfyl), Moreia (Llanfair Caereinion), Pentyrch (Llanfair Caereinion), Soar (Llanfair Caereinion), Rehoboth (Llangadfan), Pentrefelin (Llangedwyn), Penuel (Llangynog), Elim (Llanrhaeadr-ym-Mochnant), Bethania (Llansilin), Rhiwlas (Llansilin), Ebeneser (Llawr-y-glyn), Seilo (Llwydiarth), Cemaes (Machynlleth), Meifod, Bontnewydd (Meifod), Bethel (Newtown), Seion (Oswestry), Y Graig (Penffordd-las), Cefn Canol (Rhydycroesau), Carneddau (Trefonnen), Saron (Wolverhampton) |
| Ceredigion a Gogledd Penfro / Cardiganshire and North Pembrokeshire (Welsh) | Tabernacl (Aberaeron), Capel y Drindod (Aberbanc), Bryn Seion (Aberporth), Capel y Morfa (Aberystwyth), Blaenannerch, Peniel (Blaenpennal), Blaenplwyf, Capel Newydd (Boncath), Capel y Garn (Bow Street), Bronant, Salem (Brongest), Bwlch-llan, Bwlch-y-Groes, Caerfarchell, Penllwyn (Capel Bangor), Tabernacl (Cardigan), Cenarth, Rhydyfagwyr (Cnwch Coch), Llwyn-y-Groes (Cwmrheidiol), Siloam (Cwmystwyth), Clos-y-graig (Felindre), Blaencefn (Ferwig), Dyffryn (Goginan), Berachah (Goodwick), Capel Afan (Llanafan), Shiloh (Llanbedr Pont Steffan), Elim (Llanddeiniol), Bethesda (Llanddewibrefi), Coed-y-bryn (Llandysul), Gwynfil (Llangeitho), Llwynpiod (Llangeitho), Penuwch (Llangeitho), Tabor (Llangwyryfon), Maesyffynnon (Llangybi), Carmel (Llanilar), Llannon, Bethania (Llannon), Pennant (Llannon), Penrhiw (Llanrhystud), Rhiwbwys (Llanrhystud), Rhydlwyd (Lledrod), Gwastad (Llys-y-frân), Capel Madog, Salem (New Inn), Tabernacl (New Quay), Bethel (Newcastle Emlyn), Pontgarreg (Newcastle Emlyn), Tabernacl (Newport), Mynach (Pontarfynach), Ponterwyd, Rhydfendigaid (Pontrhydfendigaid), Twr-gwyn (Rhydlewis), Gosen (Rhydyfelin), Penmorfa (Sarnau), Capel Seion, Soar y Mynydd, Tabernacl (St Davids), Swyddffynnon, Nasareth (Tal-y-Bont), Rehoboth (Taliesin), Bethel (Treamlod), Moreia (Trefenter), Treffynnon, Berth (Tregaron), Bwlchgwynt (Tregaron), Glan-rhyd (Trewyddel), Walton East, Woodstock, Caradog (Ystrad Meurig) |
| Myrddin / Carmarthen (Welsh) | Bancycapel, Bancyfelin, Capel Newydd (Betws), Cwmdwyfran (Bronwydd), Moriah (Brynamman), Caeo, Capel Hendre, Soar (Cilycwm), Capel y Drindod (Crosshands), Saron (Cwmtwrch), Cwrt-y-Cadno, Bethel (Cynwyl Elfyd), Cross Inn (Dryslwyn), Peniel (Foelgastell), Cefnberach (Gelli Aur), Tabernacl (Glanamman), Gosen (Gorwydd), Morfa (Kidwelly), Capel y Dolau (Llanarthne), Capel Newydd (Llanddarog), Salem (Llandeilo), Gosen (Llandybie), Ebeneser (Llanedi), Capel Newydd (Llanelli), Triniti (Llanelli), Spite (Llanfynydd), Bryn Seion (Llangennech), Salem (Llangyndeyrn), Bethel (Llansawel), Moriah (Llansteffan), Tabernacl (Llanymddyfri), Llanlluan (Maes-y-bont), Bethel (Meidrim), Ty Hen (Meidrim), Bethania (Myddfai), Horeb (Mynyddygarreg), Nantgaredig, Salem (Pantgwyn), Bethel (Pembrey), Babell (Pensarn), Jerwsalem (Penygroes), Soar (Pontyberem), Pumsaint, Bethani (Rhydaman), Trinity (St Clears), Esgairnant (Talyllychau), Tabernacl (Trimsaran), Twynllannan, Caersalem (Ty-Croes) |
| Morgannwg Llundain / Glamorgan & London (Welsh) | Seion (Aberdulais), Brynllyfell, Eglwys y Crwys (Roath, Cardiff), Salem (Canton, Cardiff), Hermon (Cilffriw), Horeb (Crai), Tabernacl (Cwmafan), Yorath (Cwmgiedd), Bethania (Cwmtwrch), Libanus (Glanrhyd), Libanus (Hendy), Bethel Nebo (Hirwaun), Bethel (Llangyfelach), Capel Unedig De Llundain (Clapham & Sutton, London), Eglwys y Drindod (Cockfosters, London), Seion (Ealing Green, London), Jewin (London), Moriah (Loughor), Beulah (Margam), Bethania (Morriston), Ebeneser (Newport), Carmel (Pentre-Dwr), Soar (Pontardawe), Gopa (Pontarddulais), Ebeneser (Pontneddfechan), Carmel (Port Talbot), Grove Place (Port Talbot), Tabernacl (Resolven), Soar (Rhiwceiliog), Ebeneser (Rhymney), Gorffwysfa (Skewen), Capel y Cwm (Swansea), Trinity (Swansea), Nasareth (Tonna), Bethlehem (Treorchy), Jerusalem (Ystalyfera), Tabernacl (Ystradgynlais) |
| Northern (English) | Bangor-on-Dee, Caergwrle, Castle Square (Caernarfon), City Road (Chester), Seion (Colwyn Heights), Golftyn (Connah's Quay), Quaystone United (Connah's Quay)^{M}, St Thomas's (Denbigh), Ewloe Green, Bethel (Garden Village), Mancott (Hawarden), Clubmoor (Liverpool), Gloddaeth United Church (Llandudno)^{U}, Menai Bridge, Tyddyn Street (Mold)^{U}, Moreton, Northop Hall, Penrhyn Bay, Trinity (Penyffordd)^{M}, Nant Hall Road (Prestatyn), Tabernacl (Rhostyllen), United Church (Rhyl)^{U}, Rossett, Ruthin, Two Mills, Trinity (Wrexham) |
| Mid Wales & Border (English) | Aberbechan, Aberdyfi, Moriah (Abermule), St David's (Aberystwyth)^{U}, Tabernacle (Arddleen), Jerusalem (Berriew), Brooks (Berriew), Bettws Cedewain, Brecon, Alpha Ecumenical Church (Builth Wells)^{BU?}, Caersws, Cwmgolau, Heartsease (Dolau), Tanhouse (Dolau), Geuffordd (Guilsfield), Groeslwyd, Harmer Hill, Lady Southampton (Kenchester), Llandinam, William Williams Memorial (Llandovery), Ithon Road (Llandrindod Wells), Nazareth (Llangammarch), Oakley Park (Llanidloes), Trinity (Llanidloes)^{U}, Ebenezer (Llanymynech), Bethesda (Lower Chapel), Machynlleth Community Church, Montgomery, Ebenezer (Newchurch), The Crescent (Newtown), Christ Church (Oswestry)^{U}, Sychnant (Pant-y-dwr), Zoar (Pentrefelin), Bryn-y-bont (Pontfaen), Bethany (Rhayader), Talgarth United Free^{BU}, Tynewydd (Trecastle), Bethany (Tregynon), New Street United (Welshpool)^{U}, Yardro |
| South West Wales (English) | Villiers Road (Blaengwynfi), Brynmenyn, Bethesda (Burry Green), Bethel (Cefncaeau), Trinity (Cheriton), Zoar (Crofty), Tabernacle (Gorseinon), Ebenezer (Haverfordwest), Rehoboth (Milford Haven), Millin Cross, Trinity (Nantyffyllon), London Road (Neath), Mission Hall (Neath), Zion (Neyland), Ebenezer (Old Walls), Gilead (Pembroke), Tabernacle (Penclawdd), Pontarddulais, Sandfields (Port Talbot), Arlington Road (Porthcawl), Bethesda (Saundersfoot), Y Capel (Skewen), Argyle & Rhyddings Park (Swansea), Gorse Mission (Cwmbwrla, Swansea), Terrace Road (Swansea), Wiston |
| South East Wales (English) | Whitfield (Abergavenny), Holy Trinity (Barry), Bethel (Beaufort Hill), Oakdale (Blackwood), Zoar (Bonvilston), Bailey Street (Brynmawr), Libanus (Brynmawr), Trecenydd (Caerphilly), Windsor Road (Caerphilly), Cathedral Road Fairwater & Tabernacle (Cardiff), Park End (Heath, Cardiff), Saltmead Hall (Grangetown, Cardiff), Trinity (Cefn Fforest), Ysgwyddgwyn (Deri), Ebenezer (Dinas Powys), Garnlydan (Ebbw Vale), Hilltop (Ebbw Vale), Mount Pleasant (Ebbw Vale), Salem (Forest Coal Pit), Siloh (Gelligroes), Capel Ed (Goytre), Hermon (Maesycoed), Paran (Manmoel), Hope & Market Square United (Merthyr Tydfil)^{U}, Moserah (Llanfihangel Gobion), Tabernacle (Llantwit Major), Bethel (New Tredegar), Beechwood Park (Newport), Community House (Maindee, Newport), Havelock Street (Newport), Ringland (Newport), Stow Park (Newport)^{U}, Trinity (Malpas, Newport), Elfed Avenue United (Penarth)^{U}, Bethania (Pendoylan), Pentwynmawr, Hope-Penuel (Pontyclun), St David's Uniting (Pontypridd)^{BU}, Dan y Graig (Risca)^{MU}, Trehill (St Nicholas), Park (Treforest), Glyn Street (Ynys-y-bwl), Sardis (Ynysddu)^{U} |

== Chapel names ==
In the Welsh chapel tradition, chapels, rather than being dedicated to a particular saint, are named after places from the Bible. Because these place-names are written in Welsh orthography (in some cases based on the spellings used in the Authorised Version or William Morgan's Bible), and because several of the place-names are quite obscure to the interested reader, the table below identifies the referents of these dedications. Welsh words used in chapel names that have a theological meaning are also included. If a chapel name cannot be identified in the below list, it probably refers to a neighbourhood or locality within the town or village in which the chapel is located, or is an adjective such as Hen (old), Hyfrydle (delightful), Newydd (new) or Unedig (united).

| Name | Referent |
|---|---|
| Abarim | The Abarim Range, the range of mountains from which Moses viewed the Promised Land (Deuteronomy 32:49) |
| Ainon | Aenon, a place where John the Baptist conducted baptisms (John 3:23) |
| Babell | A Welsh word meaning 'tent', either a reference to the tabernacle or to the notion of believers as sojourners on the earth |
| Barachïa, Berachah | Probably transliterations of the Hebrew word berakah 'blessing' |
| Beersheba | Beersheba, a town in Israel where Abraham, Isaac and Jacob stayed (Genesis 22:19) |
| Berea | Beroea, a city in Greece whose inhabitants 'received the [gospel] message with great eagerness' (Acts 17:11) |
| Bethabara | Bethabara, the name used in the Authorised Version for 'Bethany beyond the Jordan' where John conducted baptisms (John 1:28) |
| Bethania | Bethany, a village near Jesus where he raised his friend Lazarus from the dead (John 11:1) |
| Bethel | Bethel, a place where Jacob had a vision of God, hence its name which means 'house of God' (Genesis 28:19) |
| Bethesda | Pool of Bethesda, where Jesus healed a paralysed man (John 5:2) |
| Bethlehem | Bethlehem, the home town of David and birthplace of Jesus (Matthew 2:1) |
| Bethmaca | Possibly a reference to Abel Beth Maakah, a town where a rebel against David met his end (2 Samuel 20:15) |
| Beulah, Beula | Beulah, a name meaning 'married' which Isaiah prophesies will be given to Zion (Isaiah 62:4) |
| Bosra | Bozrah, a city in Edom and prophesied location of God's judgment (Isaiah 63:1) |
| Calfaria | Calvary, the name (via Latin) of the place where Jesus was crucified |
| Cana | Cana, the village where Jesus turned water into wine (John 2:1) |
| Carmel | Mount Carmel, the site of several events in Israel's history, most notably the confrontation between Elijah and the prophets of Baal (1 Kings 18:20) |
| Cedron | Kidron Valley, a valley near Jerusalem, close to which was the site of the garden where Jesus spent the last night before his crucifixion (John 18:1) |
| Cysegr | A Welsh word meaning 'sanctuary', referring to the inner part of God's tabernacle and temple |
| Disgwylfa | A Welsh word meaning 'watchtower' |
| Dothan | Dothan, the place where Joseph's brothers sold him into slavery, and also site of a miracle of Elisha's (2 Kings 6:13) |
| Drindod, Triniti | Welsh form of the word Trinity, the Christian doctrine that God is three in one |
| Ebeneser | Eben-Ezer, 'stone of help', a stone erected by the prophet Samuel after a military victory, saying 'Thus far the Lord has helped us' (1 Samuel 7:12) |
| Elim | Elim, an oasis in the desert where the Israelites stayed on the way to Canaan |
| Engedi | En Gedi, a town known for its vineyards, where David found safety from Saul (1 Samuel 23:29) |
| Gad | Gad, one of the twelve tribes of Israel, whose name may be related to the Hebrew for 'good fortune' (Genesis 30:11) |
| Gilead | Gilead, a land on the outskirts of Israel, known as a source of balm (Jeremiah 46:11) |
| Gilgal | Gilgal, the place where the Israelites first crossed the Jordan, and site of several events in later years (Joshua 5:9) |
| Gorffwysfa | A Welsh word meaning 'resting-place', used in the Bible to denote the heavenly rest that God promises (Psalm 95:11) |
| Gosen | Goshen, the part of Egypt where the Israelites stayed during their time there (Genesis 47:27) |
| Groes, Crwys | The Welsh for 'cross', referring to the cross of Jesus |
| Hebron | Hebron, an important city in Judah, and the place where David was crowned king over Judah (2 Samuel 2:4) |
| Hermon | Mount Hermon, a high mountain on the edge of the Promised Land (Psalm 42:6) |
| Horeb | Mount Horeb, the place where Moses received the law for Israel (Deuteronomy 4:10) |
| Jerwsalem, Caersalem | Jerusalem, the capital of Israel, the location of the temple (2 Samuel 5:5) |
| Joppa | Joppa, a city to which Jonah fled, and where Peter received a vision about the Gentiles' acceptance into Israel (Acts 11:5) |
| Libanus | Lebanon, a land to the north of Israel, also used with reference to the temple because of its abundant use of cedar wood from Lebanon (Jeremiah 22:23) |
| Moreia | Mount Moriah, the place where Abraham showed himself willing to sacrifice Isaac, and where the temple was later built (2 Chronicles 3:1) |
| Moserah | A place in the wilderness where Aaron died (Deuteronomy 10:6) |
| Nasareth | Nazareth, where Jesus grew up and lived (Matthew 2:23) |
| Nebo | Mount Nebo, the mountain from which Moses viewed the Promised Land (Deuteronomy 34:1) |
| Noddfa | A Welsh word meaning place of refuge, used in the Bible to refer to the cities of refuge to which sinners could flee (Numbers 35:6) |
| Paradwys, Gwynfa | Welsh words meaning paradise (Revelation 2:7) |
| Paran | Mount Paran, a mountain near Sinai, mentioned as the location of a theophany of God (Deuteronomy 33:2) |
| Peniel, Penuel | Peniel, the place where Jacob wrestled with God and saw his face, hence the meaning 'face of God' (Genesis 32:30) |
| Pisga, Pisgah | Pisgah, the summit of the mountain from which Moses viewed the Promised Land (Deuteronomy 34:1) |
| Preswylfa | A Welsh word meaning dwelling-place, referring to God's dwelling in his temple (Psalm 26:8) |
| Rehoboth | Rehoboth, a place where Isaac dug a well, the name of which means 'broad' or 'roomy' (Genesis 26:22) |
| Salem | The short form of Jerusalem; this part of the name by itself means 'peace' (Hebrews 7:2) |
| Sardis | Sardis, one of the seven churches John writes to in Revelation; there were some in the church who 'had not soiled their clothes' (Revelation 3:4) |
| Saron | Sharon plain, a fertile part of Israel's coastlands (Isaiah 35:2) |
| Seilo, Siloh | Shiloh, where the ark of God's presence was located before its move to Jerusalem (1 Samuel 1:3) |
| Seion, Mynydd Seion | Zion, Mount Zion; part of the city of Jerusalem, later used as a name for the whole city (Isaiah 52:1) |
| Siloam | Pool of Siloam, the place to which Jesus sent the blind man; he washed and came back seeing (John 9:7) |
| Smyrna | Smyrna, one of the seven churches John writes to Revelation, and one of only two which are wholly faithful (Revelation 2:8) |
| Soar | Zoar, the place Lot fled to during the destruction of Sodom and Gomorrah, spared because as its name signifies, it was very small (Genesis 19:22) |
| Tabernacl | Tabernacle, the tent in which God dwelled with his people until the temple was built (Exodus 40:34) |
| Tabor | Mount Tabor, a mountain and the site of an Israelite victory (Judges 4:14) |
| Tiberias | Sea of Tiberias, another name for the Sea of Galilee, around which Jesus lived and taught (Mark 1:16) |

== Bodies to which PCW is affiliated ==
- Cytûn – Churches Together in Wales
- Churches Together in Britain and Ireland
- Conference of European Churches
- World Communion of Reformed Churches
- World Council of Churches

== See also ==
- Nonconformist
- Nonconformity in Wales
- Religion in Wales
- Welsh Methodist revival

== Bibliography ==
- Cross, F. L. (ed.) (1957) The Oxford Dictionary of the Christian Church. London: Oxford University Press; pp. 221–22
- Jones, David Ceri, Boyd Stanley Schlenther, and Eryn Mant White. The Elect Methodists: Calvinistic Methodism in England and Wales, 1735–1811 (University of Wales Press, 2012) 307 pages; Focuses on Griffith Jones, Thomas Haweis, Howel Harris, and George Whitefield.
- Williams, W. Welsh Calvinistic Methodism: a historical sketch. London, 1872 (third, revised edition, Bryntirion Press, 1998)
- Williams, M. W. Creative Fellowship. Caernarvon, 1935
- Davies, Gwyn (2002) A Light In The Land: a history of Christianity in Wales from 200 to 2000 AD ISBN 1-85049-181-X Bryntirion Press
- Bennett, Richard (1909) Howell Harris and the Dawn of Revival (English Translation 1962: Banner of Truth and Evangelical Press of Wales ISBN 1-85049-035-X)
- Roberts, Griffith T. (1951). Howell Harris. London : Epworth Press.

=== Primary sources ===
- Rules of Discipline. Caerleon, 1821 (in Welsh)
- Confession of Faith. Aberystwyth, 1824 (in Welsh)
  - The History, Rules of Discipline and Confession of the Calvinistic Methodists in Wales. London, 1825 (revised Welsh ed. 1876; English trans. 1877)
- The Legal Handbook for the Calvinistic Methodist Connexion; 2nd ed. Wrexham, 1911
- Harris, Howell (1984). Howell Harris: His Own Story.
