= Welsh revival =

The term Welsh Revival can refer to:

- The 1904–1905 Welsh Revival
- The Welsh Methodist revival
- The Celtic Revival of the Welsh language
