= Y Werin =

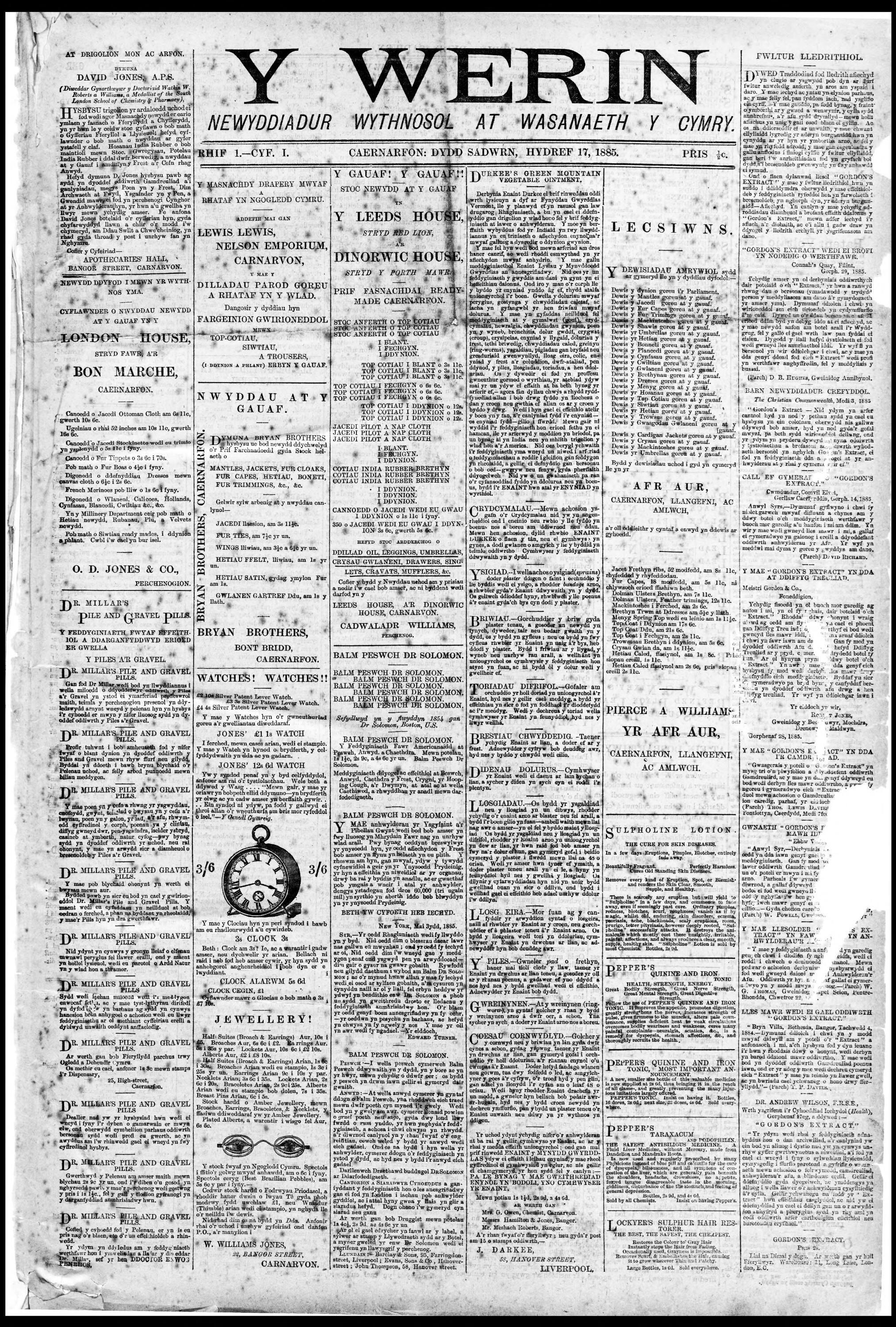
- Y Werin: newyddiadur wythnosol at wasanaeth y Cymry
- Type: weekly newspaper
- Founder: William John Parry
- Editor: William John Parry, Beriah Gwynfe Evans, John Thomas[*], Edward Morgan Humphreys
- Launched: 17 October 1885
- Ceased publication: 3 September 1914
- City: Caernarfon
- OCLC number: 751667548

Y Werin was a weekly Welsh language newspaper, supportive of labour politics, established by Welsh National Press Co. in Caernarfon and which circulated in the counties of Caernarvonshire, Anglesey and Merionethshire. One of the founders was William John Parry (1842–1927), who also edited the paper for the first three years. Other notable editors were Beriah Gwynfe Evans (1848–1927), John Thomas (Eifionydd, 1848–1922) and E. Morgan Humphreys (Celt, 1882–1955). The newspaper's main content included local and national news. In 1914, because of the lack of paper in the months prior to the First World War, it merged with 'Yr eco', to form 'Y werin a'r eco'.

== Associated titles ==
Y werin a'r eco (1914–1937).
