= Welsh Methodist revival =

Religious movement in the 18th century

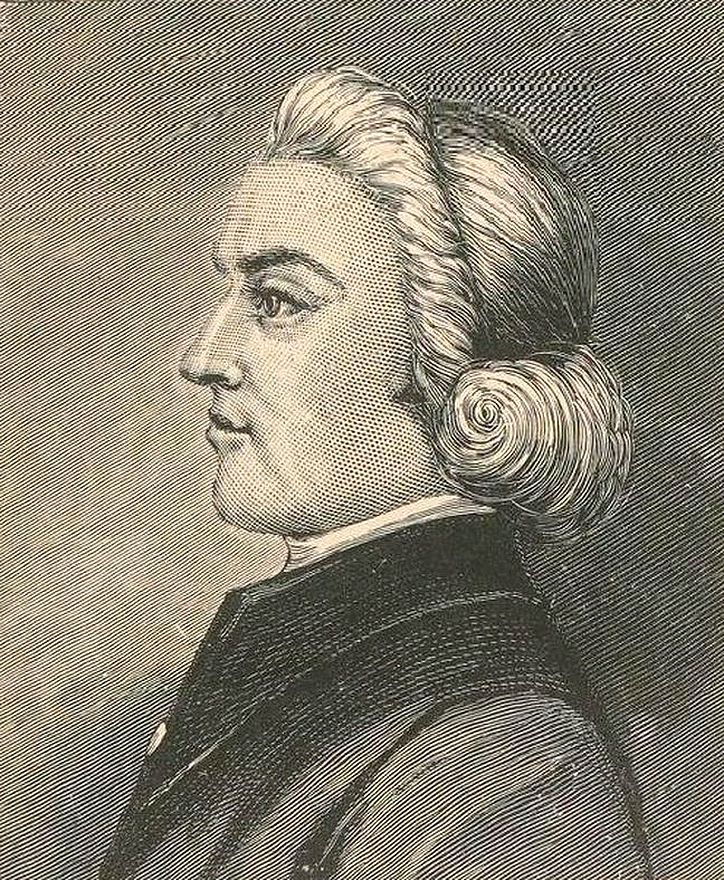
Howell Harris

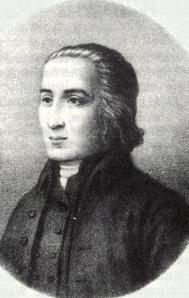
William Williams

The Welsh Methodist revival was an evangelical revival that revitalised Christianity in Wales during the 18th century. Methodist preachers such as Daniel Rowland, William Williams and Howell Harris were heavily influential in the movement. The revival led eventually to the establishment of the Welsh Calvinistic Methodists as a denomination (now more commonly known as the Presbyterian Church of Wales) and it also revitalised older dissenting churches.

== Beginnings ==
The revival's immediate beginnings are usually traced to the religious conversion of Howell Harris at Talgarth church in 1735. While listening to the Rev. Pryce Davies preaching on the necessity of partaking of Holy Communion, Harris came to the conviction that he had received mercy through the blood of Christ. He began to tell others about this and to hold meetings at his home at Trefeca for these followers.

Many consider Griffith Jones (1684–1761), the rector of Llanddowror, Carmarthenshire to have been a forerunner of the Methodist movement in Wales. Through his circulating schools he taught thousands in Wales to read the Bible and created a generation of people which would be receptive to Methodist ideas. He also preached in the open air as later Methodist leaders would do. In fact, the newly converted Harris visited him for spiritual guidance and direction, and it was through his preaching that Daniel Rowland was converted and began to preach Methodist ideas.

The other major leader of the early revival was William Williams, Pantycelyn. He was converted in 1737 as he listened to Harris preaching in Talgarth churchyard.

== Holy Jumpers ==
Following the Llangeitho revival of 1762 members of the revival were often known as Holy Jumpers on account of their habit of jumping for joy. This nickname particularly stuck after William Pantycelyn wrote Llythyr Martha Philopur at y Parchedig Philo Evangelius eu hathro (Martha Philopur's letter to the Reverend Philo Evangelius her teacher) followed by Atteb Philo-Evangelius i Martha Philopur (Philo-Evangelius's reply to Martha Philopur). These texts attempted to teach and defend the practices of the revival including that of jumping. The nickname juxtaposed them with Quakers (who 'quaked') and Shakers (who 'shook').

== A movement ==
Rowland and Harris had been at work for eighteen months before they met at Defynnog church in 1737. This led to a friendship that lasted, with a ten-year break in fellowship, until Harris's death in 1773.

Methodist leaders met regularly to organise their work and to agree on matters of common interest.

Harris and Williams undertook major preaching journeys, starting in South Wales but later venturing north. As they preached they made converts, whom they then gathered together into organised groups of fellowships (known as seiadau (societies) in Welsh). As more converts were made, more evangelists were also created, and by 1750 there were over 400 such fellowship groups in Wales. These groups were supervised by the leaders and were built into a powerful network within the Church of England.

Rowland concentrated his efforts on Llangeitho which became a centre for the movement. On Communion Sundays thousands of the members of the seiadau would travel there to receive the sacrament.

== A Calvinist movement ==
The Welsh Methodist revival differed from the Methodist revival in England in that its theology was Calvinist rather than Wesleyan-Arminian. At the beginning the leaders worked with John Wesley, but gradually they parted company from Wesley and became associated with George Whitfield and his patron, Selina, Countess of Huntingdon.

== Welsh Methodists and other denominations ==
The Methodist revival began within the Church of England in Wales and at the beginning remained as a group within it. But its success meant that Methodists gradually built their own networks, structures, and even meeting houses (or chapels), which led eventually to the secession of 1811 and the formal establishment of the Calvinistic Methodist Presbyterian Church of Wales in 1823.

The Welsh Methodist revival also had an influence on the older nonconformist churches, or dissenters—the Baptists and the Congregationalists—who in turn also experienced growth and renewal. As a result, by the middle of the nineteenth century, Wales was predominantly a nonconformist country.

== Sources ==
- Davies, Gwyn (2002), A light in the land: Christianity in Wales, 200–2000, Bridgend: Bryntirion Press, ISBN 1-85049-181-X.
- James, E. Wyn, 'Lewis Evan, Richard Tibbott and the Methodist Revival', Cylchgrawn Hanes (Journal of the Historical Society of the Presbyterian Church of Wales), 44 (2020), pp. 29–52. ISSN 0141-5255.

== See also ==
- 1904–1905 Welsh Revival
- Religion in the United Kingdom
- Julian Maunoir, leader in the 17th century Breton revival.
- Presbyterian Church of Wales
