= Pantdreiniog quarry =

Former slate quarry in Wales

Pantdreiniog
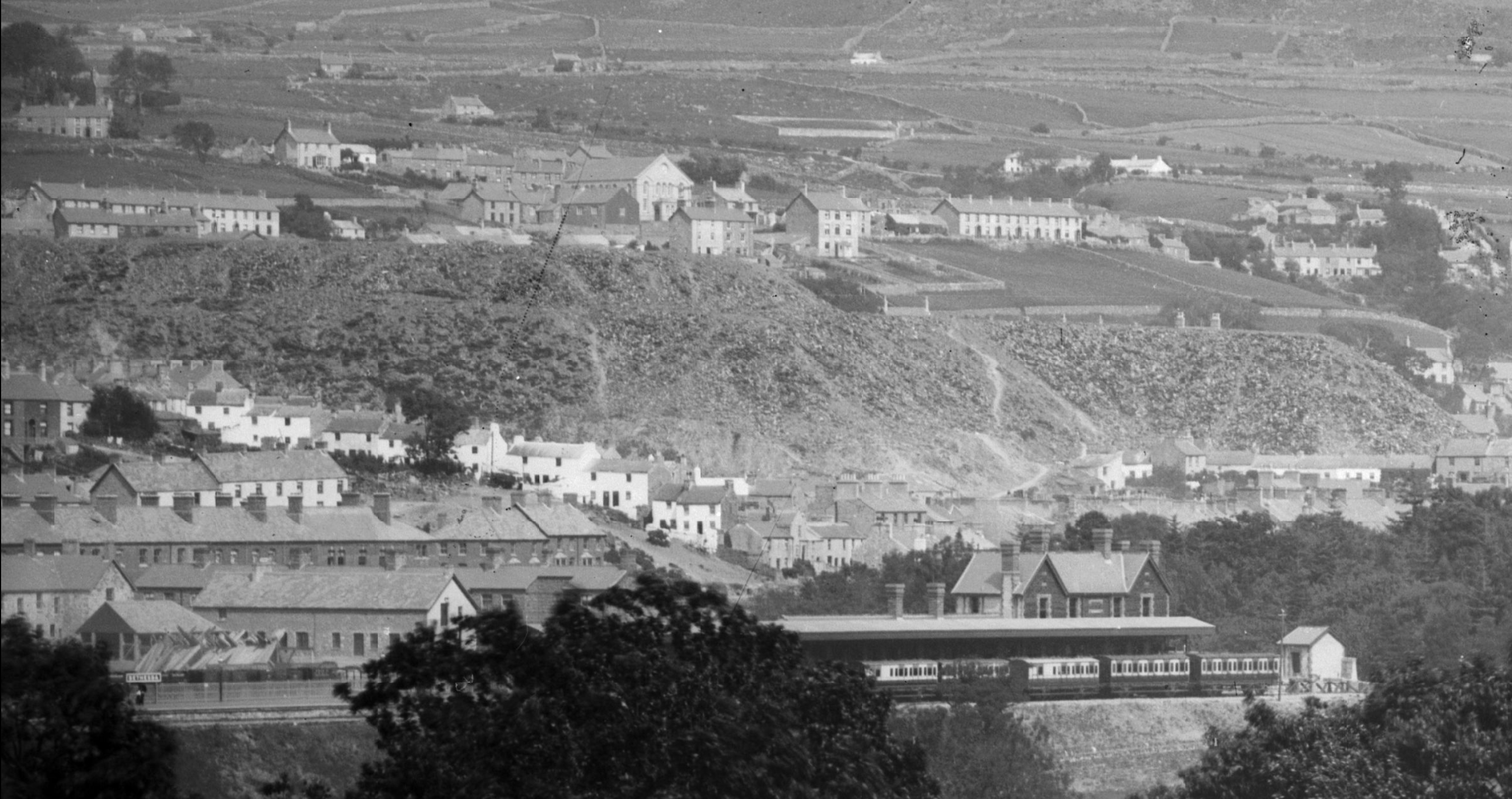
- Bethesda LNWR railway station with the waste tips of Pantdreiniog quarry behind, c.1885

- Location in Gwynedd
- Location: near Bethesda, Gwynedd, Wales; 53°11′0.71″N 4°3′40.12″W grid reference SH6228467174
- Products: Slate
- Type: Quarry
- Discovered: 1830s
- Opened: 1853
- Active: 1853-1873; 1874-1914; 1919-1930
- Closed: 1930

The Pantdreiniog quarry (also known as the Pant Dreiniog quarry) was a slate quarry within the town of Bethesda in North Wales. It was worked between about 1825 and 1923. It played a significant part in the Penrhyn Great Strike, Britain's longest industrial dispute.

== History ==
=== Early history ===
The early history of the quarry is obscure, but it appears to have started around 1825, and was certainly working in 1845, when quarryman John Hughes of Maentwrog fell to his death into the pit, which was then 40 yards (37 m) deep. In 1860, owned by William Owen, the Pantdreiniog Slate Company produced 3,000 tons of slate, dropping to 1,372 tons produced by 30 men in 1864. During the 1860s, the quarry expanded and took over the adjacent Coetmor Quarry. Sometime in the late 1860s the quarry closed.

In 1872, the quarry was re-opened by the Bangor and Pant-Dreiniog Slate Co. (Ltd.) and took on 50 workers. That year they produced 1,500 tons of finished slate. In 1884, it was recorded as worked by the Pant Dreiniog Slate Company and producing blue, purple and red slates, but that was the only year the quarry worked between 1881 and 1886, leaving the quarrymen out of work and reliant on charity.

=== W. J. Parry takes over ===
In 1896, a major industrial dispute at the nearby Penrhyn quarry resulted in hundreds of quarrymen being locked out and left without work. Alderman William John Parry was determined to help. Parry had been one of the founders of the North Wales Quarrymen's Union in 1874, and was the union's first general secretary. He led a syndicate from South Wales that purchased Pantdreiniog and was appointed manager of the quarry. By October he had taken on 40 workers, announcing his intention to only employ married men in an effort to support the families of the strikers as well as the men. This venture failed, and in March 1900 Parry was forced to put the quarry up for sale. There was no successful bid at the auction, and the quarry company went into liquidation, throwing 106 men out of work.

=== The Penrhyn Great Strike ===
On 22 November 1900, the continued friction between the quarrymen an owners at Penrhyn quarry resulted in another strike and lock out. This was the start of the "Great Strike of Penrhyn", which lasted for three years and was the longest dispute in British industrial history. 2,000 skilled workers were locked out and left without income. Parry saw an opportunity to provide work for the strikers at Pantdreiniog. In March 1901, he restarted the quarry as a worker's co-operative. In the first month of operation, the quarry turned a small profit and was able to pay wages of 32s 6p (equivalent to £130 in 2018) a week. Slate produced here was shipped via the LNWR to Deganwy on the River Conwy.

This initial attempt failed sometime in 1902, but in the summer 1903, with the Penrhyn strike still underway, Parry tried again. A new enterprise North Wales Quarries Ltd. was started, funded mainly by the North Wales Quarrymen's Union. The union contributed over £15,000 (£1,209,175) to purchase Pantdreiniog, along with the nearby Moel Faban and Tanybwlch quarries. The quarries were together called the Bethesda Co-operative Quarries and Parry was appointed the Managing Director. The company was formally incorporated on 3 October 1903. Richard Bell, the MP for Derby was the chairman of the company.

In November 1903, the Penrhyn strike ended and many quarrymen started to return to work there.

Despite the good intentions, a rift developed between Parry and the union. Parry's terms of employment were seen as almost as draconian as those that cause the Great Strike at Penrhyn. The President of the union, Henry Jones, was among the quarrymen who refused to work at the co-operative under Parry. In his 1905 address to the union he said:

One of the greatest dangers of labour organisations was to fall into the hands of men ... who professed sympathy with the common people merely in order to attain personal ends. He would say nothing of the agreement which he and others refused to sign, and for which they had been discharged, because, as Mr W. J. Parry admitted, "they had not accepted the terms of the company. If the agreement was fair, then the whole history of the Union was of no avail.

Parry had locked out his quarrymen over the disagreement about their contracts and was generally held to be against the workers and the union.

By May 1906, Pantdreiniog was back at work, but slate prices were falling, and in 1909 the company laid off 55 of its men. The quarry closed in October 1910.

=== Revival after 1919 ===
After the First World War, there was a brief boom in the slate industry as a large number of new houses were built in Britain under the Addison Act. In 1919, a new company the Pant Dreiniog Slate Quarry Company Ltd. was formed. It intended to rework material from the quarry's waste tips and pulverise it. The resulting slate dust would be formed into bricks and slabs. Initially only the grinding operation took place at the quarry, with the dust shipped to factories in Birmingham and Leigh where it was pressed into bricks. Because this process did not require the firing used to make traditional clay bricks, it was claimed to be a faster and cheaper alternative. As well as bricks, the company experimented with creating rubber goods, Portland cement, paint and pottery.

Yet again, William Parry was involved in the new company, called the North Wales Development Company. The company purchased a 30 inches (760 mm) Bradley pulverizing machine for grinding the waste and also attempted to build prefabricated houses using slate slabs in steel frame for the walls. Parry died in 1927, and it appears that this final effort to work Pant Dreiniog for slate failed at or just before this date.

=== Development after closure ===
Finding enough space to tip the large amounts of waste slate is a problem for all slate quarries. Pantdreiniog was surrounded on three sides by the houses of Bethesda, so finding enough tipping space was particularly difficult. In the 1880s, they purchased a row of houses on Cilfodan Street and tipped over them. The high tips were held back by pack walls. After the quarry closed, the tips remained. They were considered both dangerous and a significant urban blight.

Between 1957 and 1976 the Pantdreiniog pit was used as a landfill site. In the 1980s, the waste tips were removed and the quarry site was turned into open land.

== Transport ==
Like most of the local slate quarries, Pantdreiniog had an extensive internal tramway system, of approximately 2 ft (610 mm) gauge. Before 1900, a long incline ran up the east side of the pit, powered by a steam engine. Parry's enterprise of 1896 saw the quarry re-equipped and the incline was replaced by a lift on the north edge of the pit. Tramways ran east to the mill, then south to the waste tips above the town. The North Wales Quarries Ltd. further expanded the tramway network after they took over in 1903. They also purchased a steam locomotive from W.G. Bagnall to work the every lengthening tip line above Tan-y-Ffordd.

Two steam locomotives worked at the quarry, supplied by W.G. Bagnall. They were works number 1726 delivered in October 1903 and named Richard Bell, and works number 1863, delivered in November 1907, named J C Grey. Both were 0-4-0ST locomotives of the Mercedes class.
