= Christian Hymns =

Non-denominational Christian hymnbook

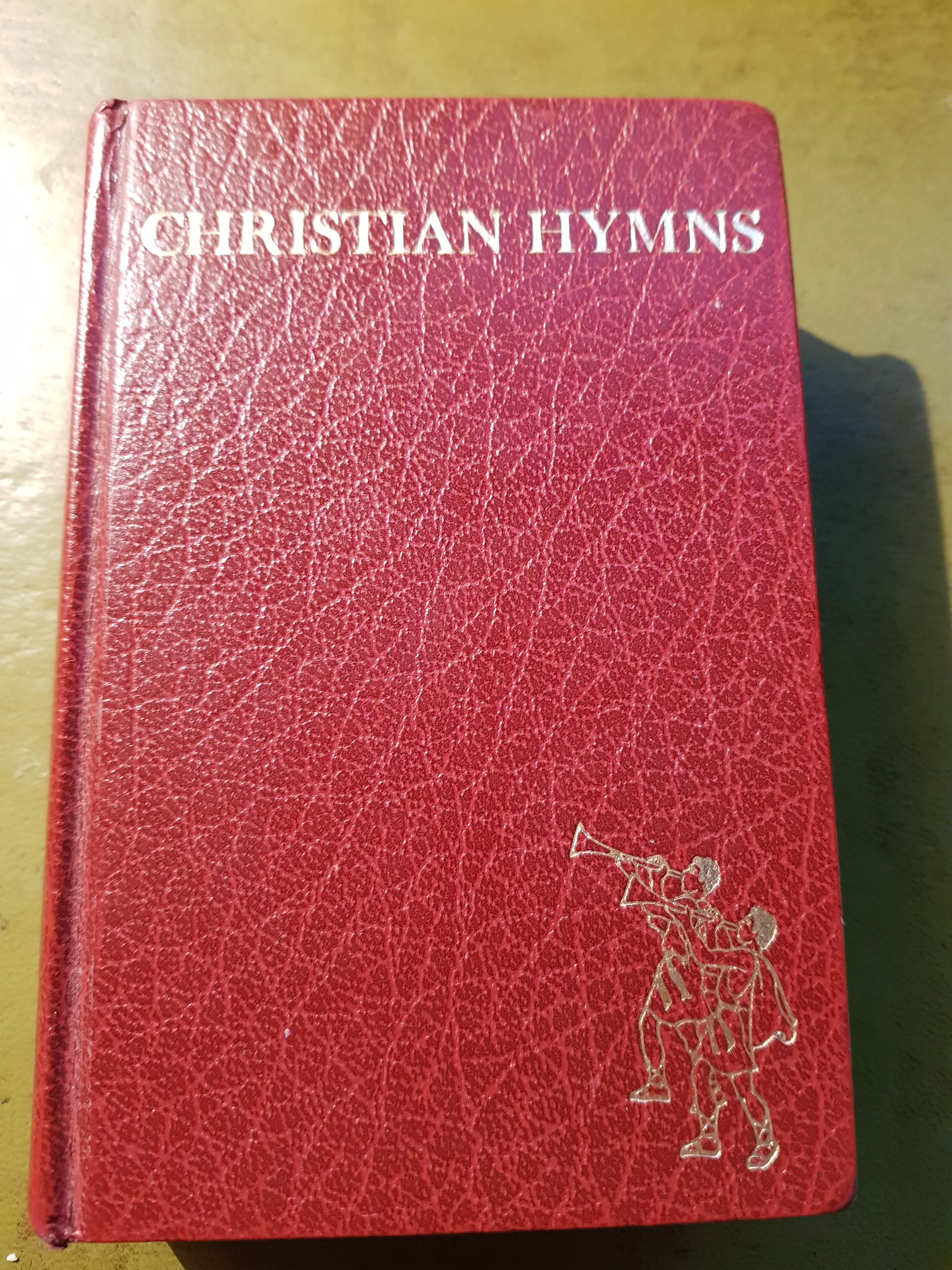
- Original 1977 hand-held version
- Language: English
- Publication date: 1977

Christian Hymns is a non-denominational Christian hymnbook.

It was first published in 1977 by the Evangelical Movement of Wales, with a second edition being published in 2004. Large print and music editions of both editions are also published.

The first edition contains 901 hymns, carols and metrical psalms arranged into 14 sections. The second edition contains over 942 hymns, 235 newly added since the first version, and 190 removed, meaning that the hymn numbers in the two versions do not match up. The book is used not just by Welsh churches but can be found in use in England and the United States.

In 2007 a DVD was released that contains recordings of all the hymns in the second edition in MP3 format. This allows use in meetings where no musician is present, or for personal devotion. This is in addition to the standard words (normal and large print) and music books.

As of December 2008, the publishers of Christian Hymns are working on a new web site, iHymns.org to encourage people to write new hymn tunes to old hymns and release them free of charge. Although the web site is not yet functional, two new tunes have been added to the main Christian Hymns site.

In 2015 an App version of the hymnbook was released in the UK for IOS and Android. It was decided that this would be the mechanism used to release new tunes for existing hymns in the hymnbook.

== See also ==
- List of English-language hymnals by denomination
