= Esyllt Harker =

Esyllt Harker (1947 – 31 May 2014) was a Welsh singer, actor and storyteller. She was born in Birkenhead to Welsh parents and grew up speaking Welsh.

She moved to Wales in 1981 when she performed as Branwen in The Mabinogi at Cardiff Castle. She had many acting roles for S4C TV, including in Pobol y Cwm, the Welsh-language soap opera.
