= Margaret Pritchard =

Margaret Pritchard MBE is a former Welsh television and radio broadcaster, best known for her work at HTV Wales. She was born in Bethesda in Gwynedd and is a first language Welsh speaker. She attended the Welsh College of Music and Drama and later gained a degree in Social Science.

Margaret joined HTV Wales in 1971 as a newsreader and presenter, working on a variety of programmes in both the Welsh and English languages. She later became a in-vision continuity announcer and concentrated on presenting a number of social affairs programmes for the station.

Margaret left HTV in January 1993 when in-vision continuity was abandoned. She then presented several series of programmes for BBC Radio Wales on social action issues such as disability, unemployment, education and health matters and also worked on a number of documentaries on social action issues for HTV such as 'Further To Your Application' which dealt with disability and employment issues.

In May 2000, she became the Chief Executive of George Thomas Hospice Care in Cardiff and the Vale of Glamorgan and five years later, won the Western Mail award for Welsh Woman of the Year in the Community. She was also a non-executive director of the three NHS Trusts including the Pontypridd and Rhondda NHS Trusts. After leading George Thomas Hospice Care (now City Hospice) for 15 years Margaret Pritchard retired in 2015.

In 2010 Margaret was made a deputy lieutenant of the County of South Glamorgan and in 2016 was awarded an MBE for services to palliative care in Cardiff.

In recent years Margaret has chaired Mental Health Hearings for the NHS and other providers.

Margaret has been married to Dr. John Copley since July 1972 and they have two daughters and two grandchildren.
