= William John Parry =

Welsh businessman, politician and author

William John Parry CBE
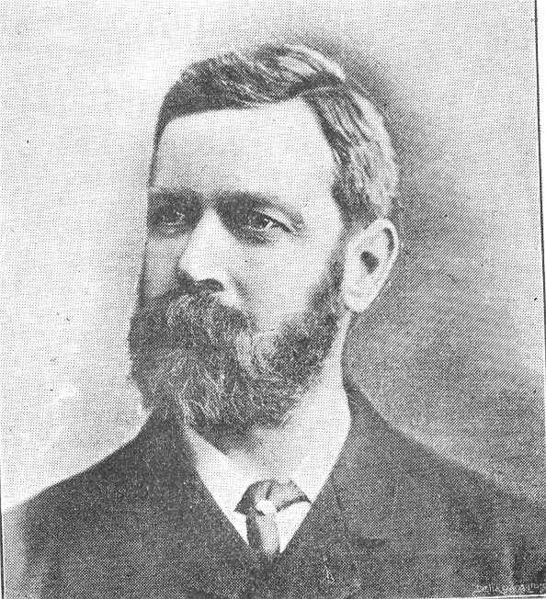
- Parry in 1897
- Born: September 28, 1842; Bethesda, Caernarfonshire, Wales
- Died: September 1, 1927 (aged 84); Bethesda, Caernarfonshire, Wales

William John Parry (28 March 1842 – 1 September 1927) was a Welsh labour leader, politician and author. Parry was a leading voice in a range of activities and causes, and was the first general secretary of the North Wales Quarrymen's Union.

== Early life and education ==
Born in Bethesda, Caernarfonshire, to John and Elizabeth, Parry initially attended the local national school before moving to Llanrwst Grammar School in 1850, where he completed his schooling. Following his graduation, he trained as an accountant.

== Career ==
=== Early career ===
Parry worked at various accountant's offices in Bangor and Caernarfon from 1857 to 1863. He held the role of secretary of Bethesda Cymreigyddion Society from 1863 to 1868, supporting local concerts and eisteddfods.

Parry was elected a deacon of Bethesda Chapel, the local Independent church, in 1866, becoming a member of the church's Local Board the next year.

=== Union leader ===
Parry religious views led him to take a keen interest in the plight of local slate and stone quarry workers, playing a prominent role in the creation of the North Wales Quarrymen's Union in 1874 and becoming the union's first general secretary. Parry later became the union's president, an office he held for 9 years. In 1871 and 1879 he visited slate mines in the United States on the request of his union.

=== Politics ===
In 1889 Parry became a member of the first Caernarfonshire County Council, and held the role of chairman from 1892 to 1893. In 1896, he led the purchase of the Pantdreiniog quarry in Bethesda and became the manager.

Parry was appointed Commander of the Order of the British Empire in 1920 for services to politics.

=== Writing ===
Parry wrote for several local newspapers, in both the Welsh and English language, and published several books. Of note are his works y Ymdrafodaeth (1875) and The Penrhyn Lock-out (1900). Many of his papers and writings are held at Bangor University.

== Death ==
Parry died on 1 September 1927 in Bethesda, Caernarfonshire, at the age of 84.
