= Ysgol y Gader =

Location
- Arran Road; Dolgellau, Gwynedd, LL40 1HY; Wales; 52.7417°N 3.8802°W

Information
- Type: Comprehensive
- Established: 1962; 64 years ago
- Local authority: Gwynedd
- Headteacher: David Jones
- Gender: Coeducational
- Age: 11 to 16
- Enrolment: 382
- Publication: Gair y Gader
- Website: www.gader.gwynedd.sch.uk

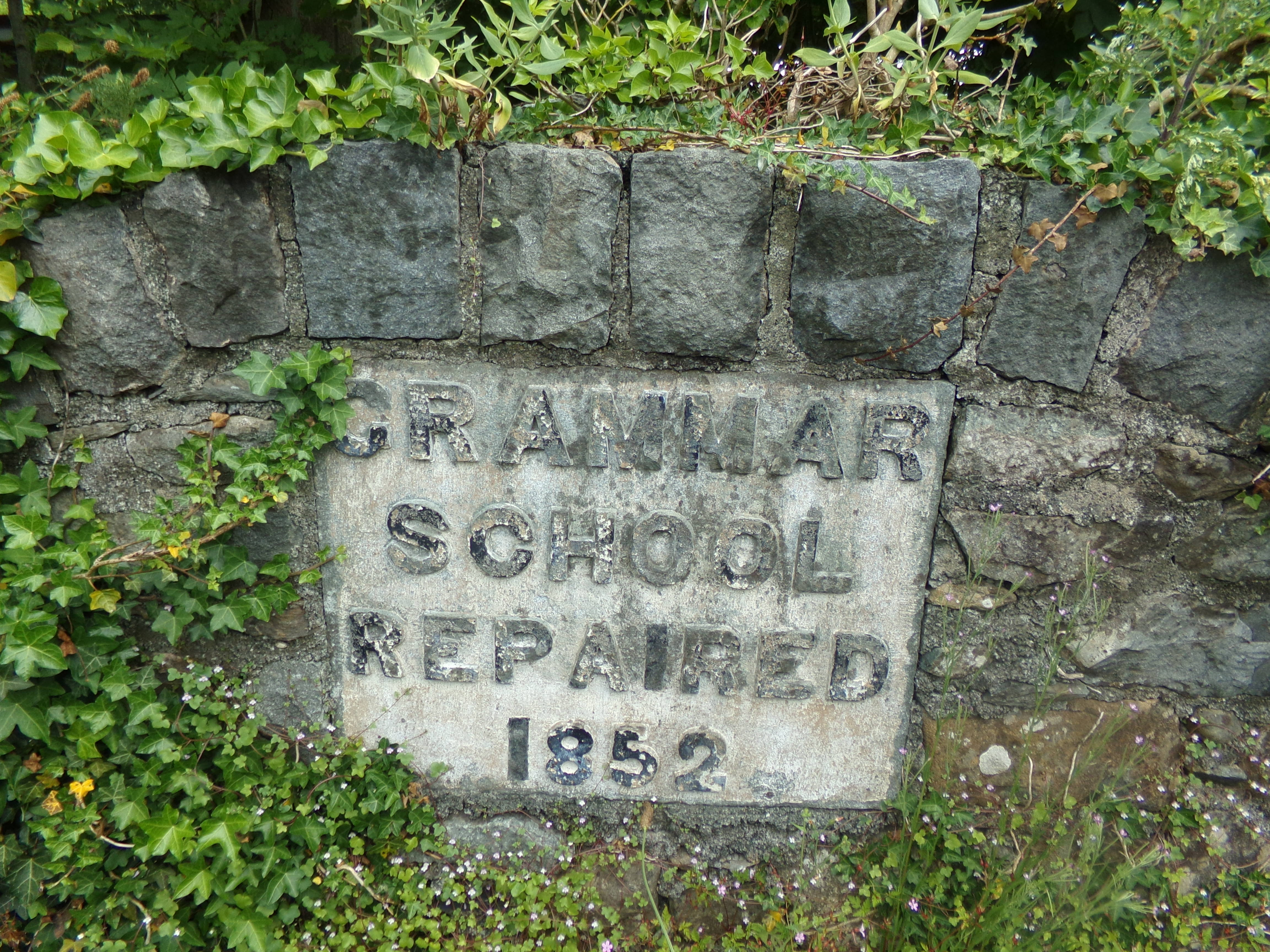
Stone marking the original site of Dolgellau Grammar School

Ysgol y Gader was a bilingual comprehensive school for pupils aged 11–16 that served the town of Dolgellau and the surrounding area in South Meirionnydd.

The school was categorised by the Welsh Government as a 'Bilingual 2CH' secondary school, meaning that all subjects, except Welsh and English, were taught to all pupils using both languages. According to the latest Estyn inspection report conducted in 2015, 29% of pupils came from homes in which Welsh is the main language, with 94% of pupils being able to speak Welsh to first language standard.

Ysgol y Gader closed on 7 September 2017 and was replaced by a 3-16 all-through school - Ysgol Bro Idris.
