= Evangelical Movement of Wales =

- Classification: Protestant
- Theology: Evangelical
- Region: Wales
- Origin: 1948
- Official website: https://www.emw.org.uk

The Evangelical Movement of Wales (EMW) is a registered charity that supports churches and Christians in Wales, led by church leaders.

The Movement runs conferences, children's camps and events as well as support churches through a publishing house (Bryntirion Press), pastoral support and theological training.

== Priorities ==
The stated priorities of the organisation are:

- Supporting, training and developing church leaders
- Resourcing churches and Christians with resources and publications
- Organising conferences and events that teach the Bible and promote Christian unity
- Running camps and other ministries for young people
- Supporting churches and Christians in mission and evangelism
- Encouraging prayer for Wales

== Beliefs ==
The stated beliefs of the organisation are:

- In the only true and living God, the Holy Trinity of Divine Persons in perfect unity, Father, Son and Holy Spirit, each of whom is co-equal and co-eternal, and sovereign in creation providence and redemption.
- In the God and Father of our Lord Jesus Christ, who is holy, righteous, full of grace, mercy, compassion and love. In His infinite love He sent forth the Son that through Him the world might be saved.
- In the Lord Jesus Christ, the incarnate Son of God, whose true humanity and full deity were mysteriously and really joined in the unity of His divine person. We believe in His virgin birth, in His perfect life and teaching, in His substitutionary, atoning death on the cross, where He triumphed over Satan, sin and death; in His bodily resurrection and His ascension into heaven, where now He sits in glory at the right hand of God.
- In the Holy Spirit, the third person of the Godhead, whose work is indispensable to regenerate the sinner, to lead him to repentance, to give him faith in Christ, to sanctify the believer in this present life and fit him to enjoy fellowship with God. For spiritual power and effectiveness His ministry is essential to the individual Christian and the Church.
- That as a result of the Fall all men are sinful by nature. Sin pollutes and controls them, infects every part of their being, renders them guilty in the sight of a holy God and subject to the penalty which, in His wrath and condemnation, He has decreed against it.
- That through faith (and only faith) in the Lord Jesus Christ, whose death was a perfect oblation and satisfaction for our sins, the sinner is freely justified by God who, instead of reckoning to us our sins, reckons Christ’s righteousness to our account. Salvation is therefore by grace and not by human merit.
- That the Lord Jesus Christ will return personally, visibly and gloriously to this earth, to receive His saints to Himself and to be seen of all men. As the righteous Judge, He will divide all men into two, and only two categories-the saved and the lost. Those whose faith is in Christ will be saved eternally, and will enter into the joy of their Lord, sharing with Him His inheritance in heaven. The unbelieving will be condemned by Him to hell, where eternally they will be punished for their sins under the righteous judgement of God.

== History ==
The Evangelical Movement of Wales, formed in 1948, came to light as a counter move by reformed Christians to the liberal theology which was gaining influence into the Protestant denominations of Wales during the 20th century. The Movement is a fellowship of churches and individuals who accept and recognise the Holy Scriptures, as originally given, as the infallible Word of God and of divine inspiration, and their sole authority in all matters of faith and practice. The Movement serves both English and Welsh speakers. Given this bilingual focus, where appropriate, parallel and corresponding status is given to both languages in their work.

The Movement's first initiative was to publish Y Cylchgrawn Efengylaidd (The Evangelical Magazine), of which the first edition was November / December 1948. The magazine was originally published in Welsh and soon after a sister magazine was published in English. Editions of the magazine continues to be published every two months in English, and every three months in Welsh. As well as the flagship magazine, a Welsh language youth magazine (Llwybrau) and a bilingual evangelistic magazine (Ask) are also published.

The General Secretary of the Movement for 45 years and one of its founders was Rev J. Elwyn Davies, who stated "The Movement became a focus for fellowship, nurture and service for Christians who found themselves placed at a considerable disadvantage in churches and denominations which, to a very considerable extent, had departed from the main tenets of the Christian faith."

The Movement and Dr Martyn Lloyd-Jones (one of its influential supporters), have been influential among Evangelical Christians in Wales and beyond. Experiencing increased hostility in the 1960s and 1970s within their churches, a number of pastors and congregations sympathetic to the Movement left their denominations and set up independent evangelical churches in many parts of Wales.

== See also ==
- Christian Hymns (hymnbook)

== Sources ==
- Davies, Gwyn : 'A Light in the Land - Christianity in Wales 200–2000' : 2002 : ISBN 1-85049-181-X
- Gibbard, Noel : 'The history of the Evangelical Movement of Wales 1948–98' : 2002 : ISBN 1-85049-191-7
