= Calvinistic Methodism =

Protestant Christian tradition

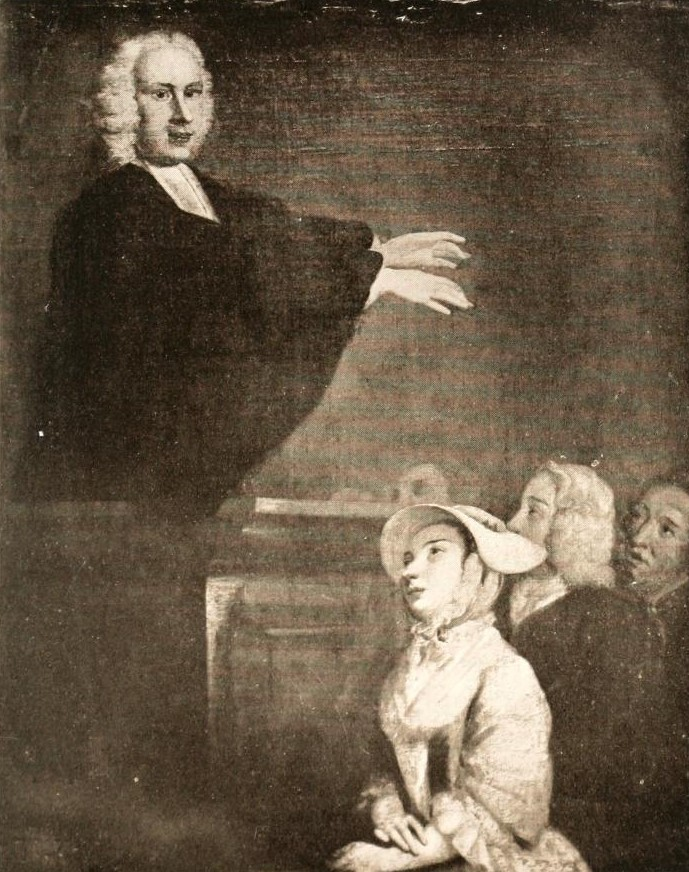
George Whitefield, the father of Calvinistic Methodism, preaching to a congregation

Calvinistic Methodism is a Protestant Christian tradition historically associated with Methodism and distinguished by its adherence to the Reformed theology of John Calvin. In addition to Reformed soteriology, Calvinistic Methodists adhere to Reformed covenant theology. (The majority of Methodism in the present day adheres to Wesleyan-Arminian theology, formulated by John Wesley and codified by John William Fletcher.) Calvinistic Methodism traces its origins to the Evangelical Revival work of George Whitefield, a contemporary of John Wesley. Calvinistic Methodist doctrine is explicated in the Confession of Faith of the Calvinistic Methodists of Wales (1823).

Like their Wesleyan Methodist counterparts, Calvinistic Methodists engage in Bible study, extemporaneous prayer, self-examination, and emphasize preaching. The sermon is the centre of Calvinistic Methodist worship. Unlike other Reformed Churches, Calvinistic Methodists teach the Methodist doctrine of the New Birth—a personal experience of salvation. George Whitefield experienced an evangelical conversion in 1735 and his sermon The Nature and Necessity of our New Birth in Christ Jesus in Order to Salvation (1737) was widely read. Calvinistic Methodists who write about their salvation do so "within the framework of the Calvinist ordo salutis—this 'order of salvation' of ruin, redemption and restoration." However, the distinctive doctrine that characterizes Wesleyan Methodism—entire sanctification—is not upheld by Calvinistic Methodists; while both Wesleyan Methodists and Calvinistic Methodists teach a growth in grace, Calvinistic Methodists do not believe that believers can be entirely sanctified in this life. Calvinistic Methodists teach believers should "expect the Christian life to be characterised by a gradual process of conquestion over indwelling sin and training in the habits of practical godliness." Tempation is addressed through participation in the means of grace. Calvinistic Methodists teach that "one who had been justified by faith could have the inner, personal assurance of their acceptance with God through the witness of the Spirit." In contrast, "Cavin believed the inner testimony of the Holy Spirit confirmed the authority of Scripture instead of confirming inwardly one's assurance of salvation; although Calvin believed the Spirit was the agent who joined the believer to Christ."

In 1741, a formal schism between Calvinistic Methodists led by George Whitefield and Wesleyan Methodists led by John Wesley occurred; points of contention were outlined in A Letter to the Rev. Mr. John Wesley: In Answer to his Sermon Entituled Free Grace. Subsequently, the Evangelical Revival was characterized by three groups: the Moravians, Wesleyan Methodists, and Calvinistic Methodists. Calvinistic Methodist preacher Howell Harris "developed an organisational structure that tied together Calvinistic Methodism in England and Wales." In 1741, the main centres of Calvinistic Methodism included London, Bristol, Gloucestershire, and Wales. Between 1741 and 1743, Calvinistic Methodist societies implemented the use of bands that met once a week to pray, encourage one another and study the faith. By 1750, over 420 Calvinistic Methodist societies were present in the Kingdom of Great Britain.

== Denominations ==
Calvinistic Methodism is represented in the Countess of Huntingdon's Connexion, which has congregations around the world; Calvinistic Methodism was formalized in the Presbyterian Church of Wales, which is also known as the Calvinistic Methodist Church.

== See also ==
- Welsh Methodist revival
