= Afon Cegin =

River in Wales

Coordinates: 53°13′52″N 4°06′39″W

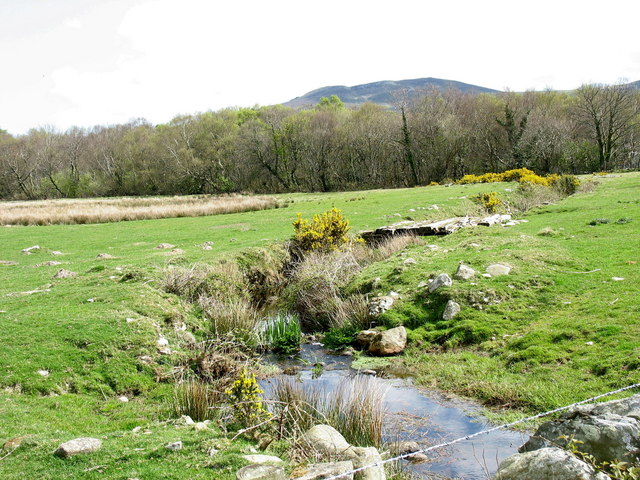
Afon Cegin headwaters

Afon Cegin (Welsh for 'kitchen river'; also "River Cegin" in English) is a small river draining parts of North Wales and discharging to the Menai Strait at Porth Penrhyn.

== Course ==
The headwaters include two sites near Pentir. From here the Cegin flows to the east, before turning towards the north and passing through the village of Glasinfryn. Just north of here it is crossed by the A55 Expressway. Immediately after this, the Lôn Las Ogwen joins the line of the river, and the two run close together until the mouth of the river.

The river is forded by a minor road near Llandygai, and is crossed by the Cegin Viaduct, which carries the main Chester to Holyhead trainline. The river then passes between Maesgeirchen housing estate to the west, and Llandygai Industrial Estate to the east. The river is also crossed by the A5 closer to Bangor.

The most northerly stretch is crossed by a further two bridges, which carried the former L. & N.W.R. branchline. The river passes through the arches of the Penrhyn viaduct, before entering the Cegin pool, an area of tidal saltmarsh.

The final crossings are: Pont Penrhyn, carrying a road way accessing the west gatehouse of Penrhyn Castle, and a lower bridge now carrying road traffic to Porth Penrhyn. North of these bridges stone walls leading the river to its entry into Bae Hirael.

== History ==
The Cegin valley was heavily industrialised in the eighteenth and nineteenth centuries with two railway lines - the Penrhyn Quarry Railway and the Bethesda branch line - carrying slate from quarries in the hills down to Porth Penrhyn to be shipped across the world. The Lôn Las Ogwen cycleway and footpath runs beside the river along the trackbed of the quarry railway. Just above Port Penrhyn a series of closely connected old bridges cross the Cegin. This complex is a listed building.
