= Tregarth =

Village in Gwynedd, Wales

Coordinates: 53.189°N 4.091°W

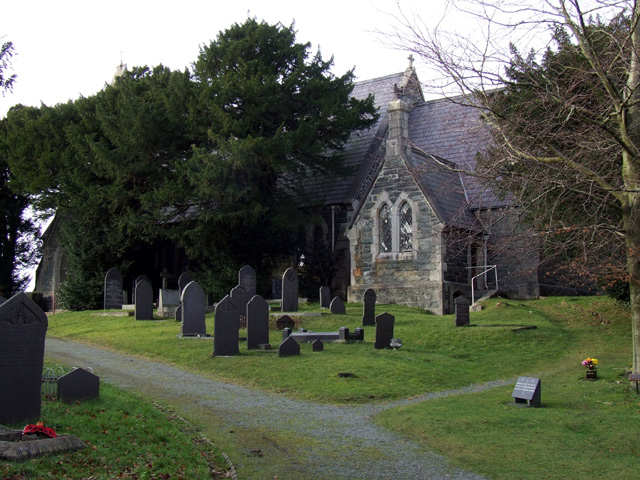
- St Mary's Church, Tregarth

- Location within Gwynedd
- Population: 1,307
- OS grid reference: SH603678
- Community: Llandygai
- Principal area: Gwynedd
- Country: Wales
- Sovereign state: United Kingdom
- Post town: BANGOR
- Postcode district: LL57
- Dialling code: 01258
- Police: North Wales
- Fire: North Wales
- Ambulance: Welsh
- UK Parliament: Bangor Aberconwy
- Senedd Cymru – Welsh Parliament: Arfon

Tregarth is a village between the town of Bethesda and the city of Bangor in Gwynedd, North Wales. It is in Llandygai Community. It had a population of over 1,300 as of the 2011 census.

== History ==
The village grew around the local slate industry, with many houses being built to house quarry workers and their families. The village is renowned for a street of houses that were built by Lord Penrhyn, proprietor of the Penrhyn Quarry and occupier of Penrhyn Castle, to accommodate the workers that refused to strike during the Penrhyn Lockout of 1900–1903. The street, Tanrhiw Road, was known locally as 'Stryd y Gynffon' (Traitor's Row or Tail Terrace) and was one of the first main settlements in the village based alongside the farmsteads of Ty'n Clawdd, Tanrhiw Isaf and Tanrhiw Uchaf.

Tregarth has a population of around 1,300 people, of whom around 80% consider the Welsh language their first language.

The village is the birthplace of Ifor Williams, Ifor Bowen Griffith, T. Gwynn Jones and actor John Ogwen. Tregarth is also home to sculptor Ann Catrin Evans.

== Amenities ==
Tregarth has its own primary school, chapel (Shiloh), parish church (Santes Fair, St Mary's) and community centre which is the venue for many village activities such as Ysgol Feithrin (nursery school), Youth Club, Clwb yr Henoed (Senior Citizens Club) and Snooker Club. The public house, Pant yr Ardd, was closed and put up for sale in June 2014. It was bought by an unknown source and is re-opened in December 2014.

Owing to Bethesda's industrial heritage, Tregarth has two railway lines running through its centre, one the Bethesda Branch Line (London and North Western Railway) which was closed in 1963 and the other The Narrow Gauge Penrhyn Quarry Railway Line which was used to transport slate from the Penrhyn Quarries to Port Penrhyn and was closed in 1962. There was a station on the Bethesda Branch which opened in 1884 and closed in 1963. These lines have since been converted to the Lôn Las Ogwen cycle path as part of Sustrans Lôn Las Cymru cycle route 5 and take the cyclist on a journey from the Nant Ffrancon Pass winding through Tregarth down along the River Cegin towards Bangor and Port Penrhyn. An hourly bus service into the town is provided by Arriva Buses Wales.

The Moelyci Environmental Centre (Canolfan Amgylcheddol Moelyci) can also be found on the outskirts of Tregarth; it is a community-based centre which specialises in the practice and teaching of sustainability. The centre runs many open days and activities and welcomes visitors.
