= Felin Hen Halt railway station =

Disused railway station in Gwynedd, Wales

Felin Hen Halt

General information
- Location: Glasinfryn, Gwynedd; Wales
- Coordinates: 53.1935°N 4.1112°W
- Grid reference: SH590683
- Platforms: 1

Other information
- Status: Disused

History
- Original company: London and North Western Railway
- Pre-grouping: London and North Western Railway
- Post-grouping: London, Midland and Scottish Railway

Key dates
- 1 July 1884: Opened
- 3 December 1951: Closed
Location

Felin Hen Halt railway station was a station in Glasinfryn, Gwynedd, Wales on the Bethesda branch line. The station was opened on 1 July 1884 and closed on 3 December 1951.

| Preceding station | Disused railways | Following station |
|---|---|---|
| Bangor; Line and station open | London and North Western Railway; Bethesda Branch Line | Tregarth; Line and station closed |
