= Lôn Las Ogwen =

Cycle route in Wales

Coordinates: 51.2111°N 4.1180°W

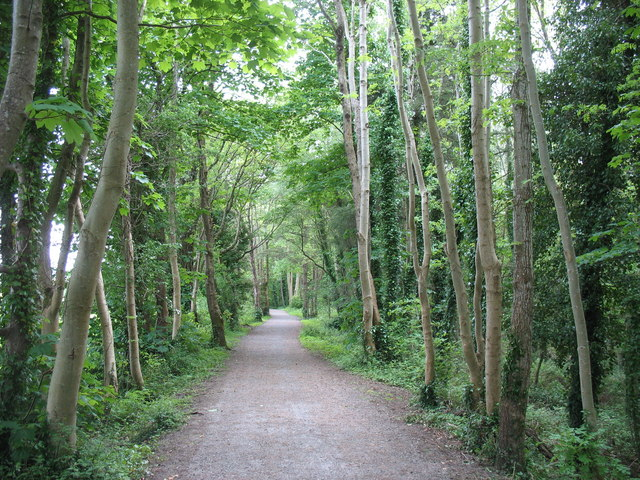
The Lôn Las Ogwen where it follows the route of the Penrhyn Quarry Railway in the valley of Afon Cegin.

Lôn Las Ogwen is a 17.7 km (11 mi) cycle route in the National Cycle Network which runs south from the NCN 5 at Porth Penrhyn on the north coast of Wales to Llyn Ogwen in Snowdonia. Lôn Las is Welsh for "green lane".

From Porth Penrhyn to Penrhyn Quarry it follows the former Penrhyn Quarry Railway trackbed. After Tregarth the route climbs about 700 feet (210 m) to Ogwen Cottage.

== Route ==
Porth Penrhyn | Glasinfryn | Tregarth | Bethesda | Nant Ffrancon | Ogwen Cottage | Llyn Ogwen

== See also ==
- Rail trail
