= Tregarth railway station =

Disused railway station in Gwynedd, Wales

Tregarth
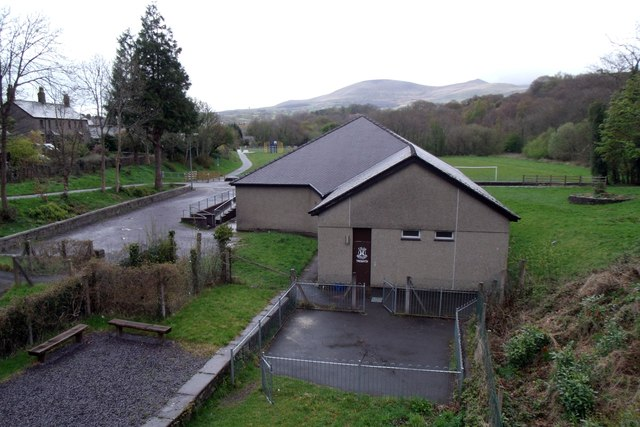
- The site of the station in 2012

General information
- Location: Tregarth, Gwynedd; Wales
- Coordinates: 53.1911°N 4.0931°W
- Grid reference: SH602680
- Platforms: 1

Other information
- Status: Disused

History
- Original company: London and North Western Railway
- Pre-grouping: London and North Western Railway
- Post-grouping: London, Midland and Scottish Railway

Key dates
- 1 July 1884: Opened
- 3 December 1951: Closed to passengers
- 7 October 1963: Closed
Location

Tregarth railway station is a disused railway station in Gwynedd, Wales. It was located on the Bethesda Branch line, just north of the village of Tregarth itself.

== History ==
The station was opened by the London and North Western Railway on 1 July 1884 as originally the terminus of the 4.25-mile (6.84 km) Bethesda branch line before it was later extended to the town of Bethesda.

The station was host to two LMS caravans from 1935 to 1939.

The station closed to passengers on 3 December 1951 and was closed on 7 October 1963. Since closure the station building has been demolished and only a short section of platform remains.

Preceding station	Disused railways	Following station
Felin Hen Halt; Line and station closed	London and North Western Railway; Bethesda Branch Line	Bethesda; Line and station closed
