= Bethesda railway station =

Disused railway station in Gwynedd, Wales

Bethesda
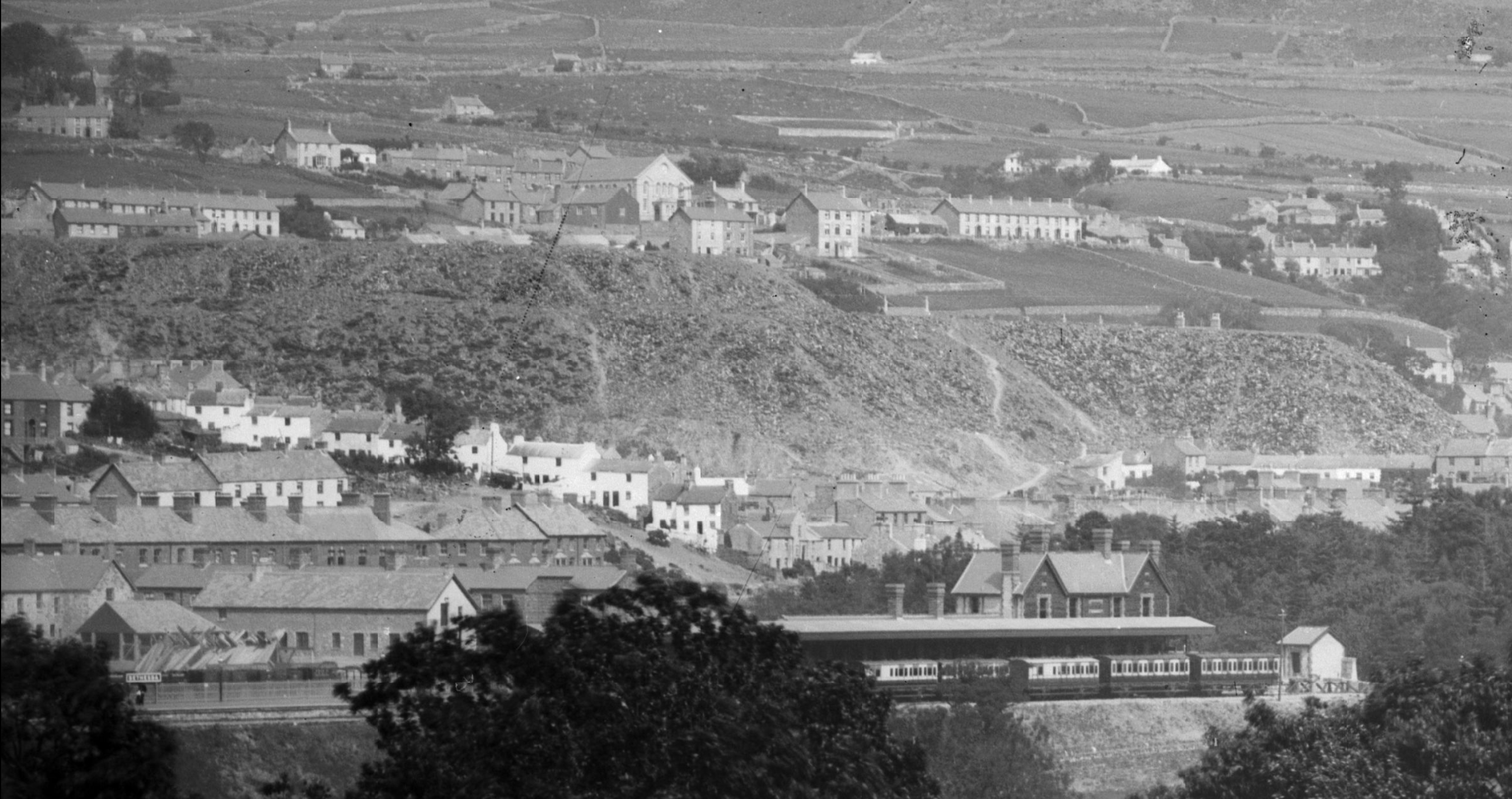
- The station and Pantdreiniog quarry circa 1885

General information
- Location: Bethesda, Gwynedd; Wales
- Coordinates: 53.1807°N 4.0687°W
- Grid reference: SH618668
- Platforms: 1

Other information
- Status: Disused

History
- Original company: London and North Western Railway
- Pre-grouping: London and North Western Railway
- Post-grouping: London, Midland and Scottish Railway

Key dates
- 1 July 1884: Opened
- 3 December 1951: Closed to passengers
- 7 October 1963: Closed completely
Location

Bethesda railway station was a station in Bethesda, Gwynedd, Wales.

== History ==
The station was opened by the London and North Western Railway on 1 July 1884 as the terminal of the 4.25-mile (6.84 km) Bethesda branch line.

The station was host to three LMS caravans from 1934 to 1936, with four caravans from 1937 to 1939.

The station closed to passengers on 3 December 1951 and closed completely on 7 October 1963. Since closure the station has been demolished.

Preceding station	Disused railways	Following station
Tregarth; Line and station closed	London and North Western Railway; Bethesda Branch Line	Terminus
