= Rock cannon =

Rock with gunpowder inside that is made to explode

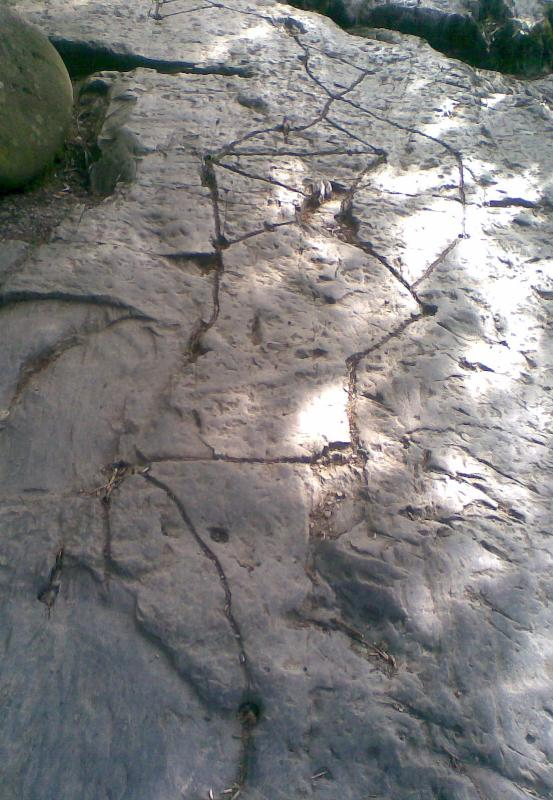
Part of the 53-hole rock cannon at Betws-y-coed

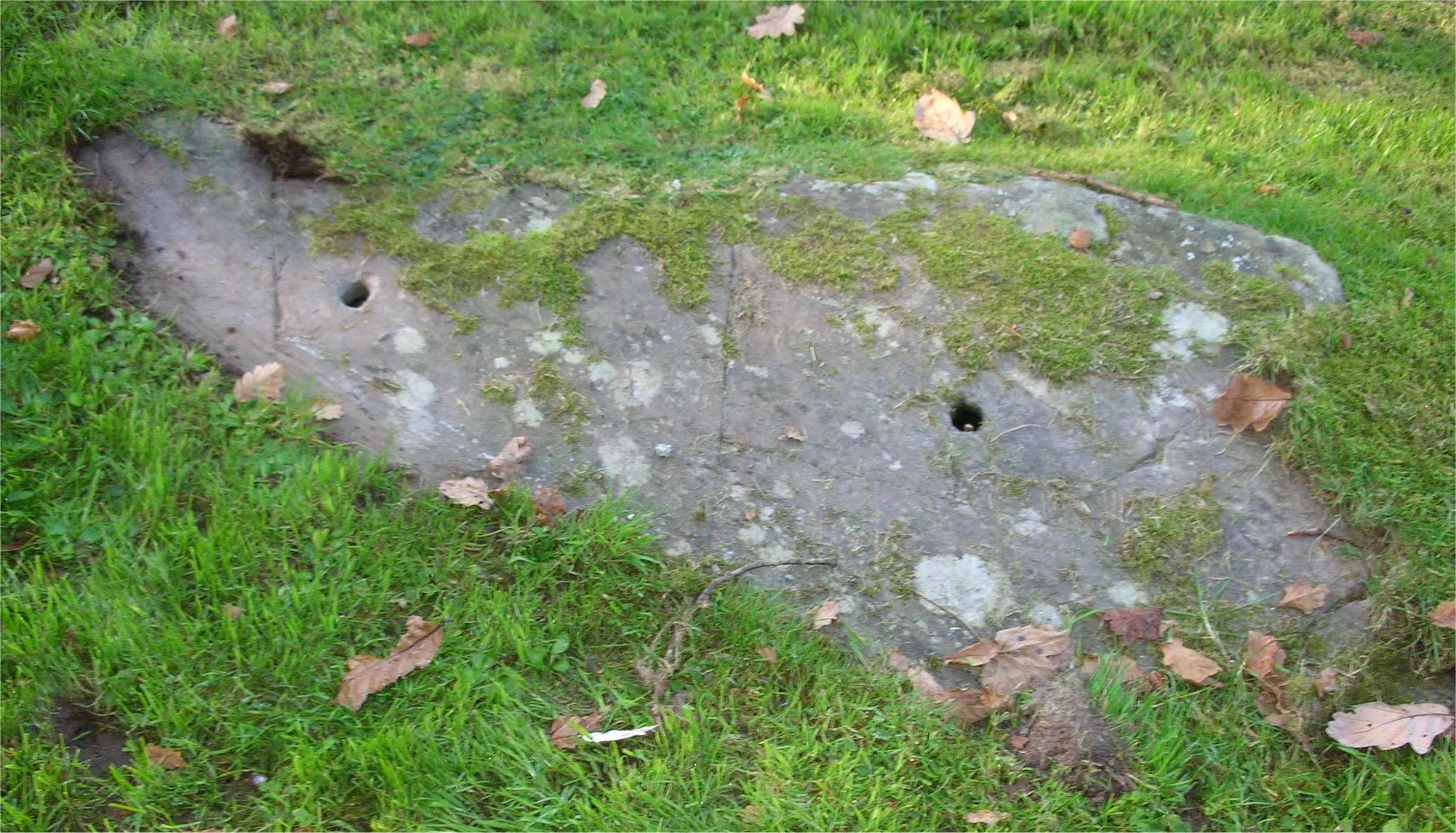
Two of the five holes in the rock cannon in Parc Bron y Graig, Harlech

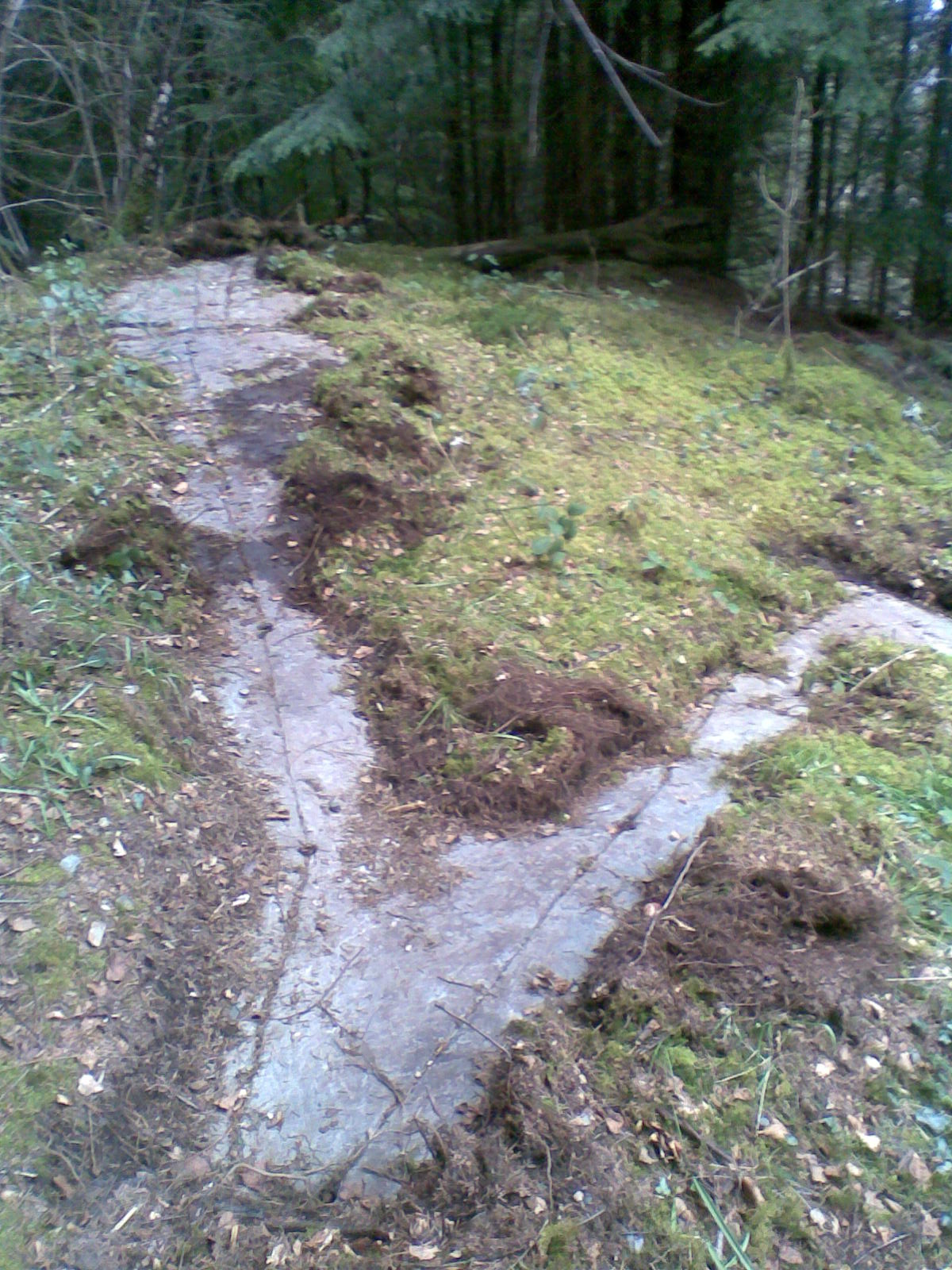
The rock cannon on the hillside above Trefriw now lies in the forest.

A rock cannon, also known in Welsh as a carreg cannan (plural: cerrig cannan), craig cannan, or in the 19th century, craig fagnel (plural: craig fagnelau; Welsh: magnel - gun, cannon), is a rock or boulder which has been bored with holes which can be partly loaded with black powder (gunpowder) and ignited to make explosive sounds during traditional celebrations. They are largely found in the slate quarrying areas of Gwynedd in North Wales (235 sites found up to 2001). Each cannon has a number of holes which may range from 3 to 195 (at Y Parc, Sling, Tregarth).

The firing of rock cannon was a traditional part of social events and celebrations in north Wales from the late 18th century, accompanied by fireworks and bonfires. The cannon firing, as part of wider celebrations, often marked a national or local event, visits by royalty, or notable births and marriages.

On a national level, the marriage of Albert Edward, Prince of Wales to Princess Alexandra of Denmark in 1863 was widely celebrated, as was the Diamond Jubilee of Queen Victoria and subsequent coronations. It is recorded that the afore-mentioned marriage was celebrated at the 13 hole cannon at Trefriw, in Gwynedd, where local newspaper stated that "Rock and metal cannons were fired in such profusion that about 8cwt of gunpowder was consumed."

The visit of the Duchess of Kent to Blaenau Ffestiniog saw a firing as late as 1951.

On a more local level cannon were fired to mark the laying of the first stone on the Ffestiniog Railway in 1832, its opening in 1836, and the opening of the Moelwyn Tunnel in 1842.

In Gwynedd the Penrhyn, Vaynol, and Tanybwlch quarrying estates had large numbers of cannon.

At Betws-y-coed, in Conwy the river-side cannon at Pont-y-pair comprises 3 separate cannons. The largest covers an area of 9.25 m x 3.22 m, and comprises 53 holes. Close to it lies a second cannon, comprising just 7 holes in a single train measuring 2.7 m long. A third cannon, comprising 24 holes, lies in an elevated position a little upstream, and covers an area measuring 3.5 m x 1.7 m. This was constructed at a different time from the other two, and is of a poor design, the holes being bored into the cleavage plane.

Llangynog in the Berwyn range, Llandderfel near Corwen, and east Denbighshire also had cannon. One site exists at Seathwaite (Lake District) and four in Cornwall, where they are known in Cornwall as merriment holes.

There are two basic patterns of construction. The stone may simply have a series of holes drilled at regular intervals. The ignition was carried between adjacent holes by a trail of black powder over the surface of the stone which was held in place by goose grease. A later construction had the holes linked by shallow grooves, often curved to lengthen the interval between bangs. The black powder was then laid in the grooves and covered with powdered stone to keep it in place.
