= Padarn Bus =

Bus operator in Gwynedd, Wales

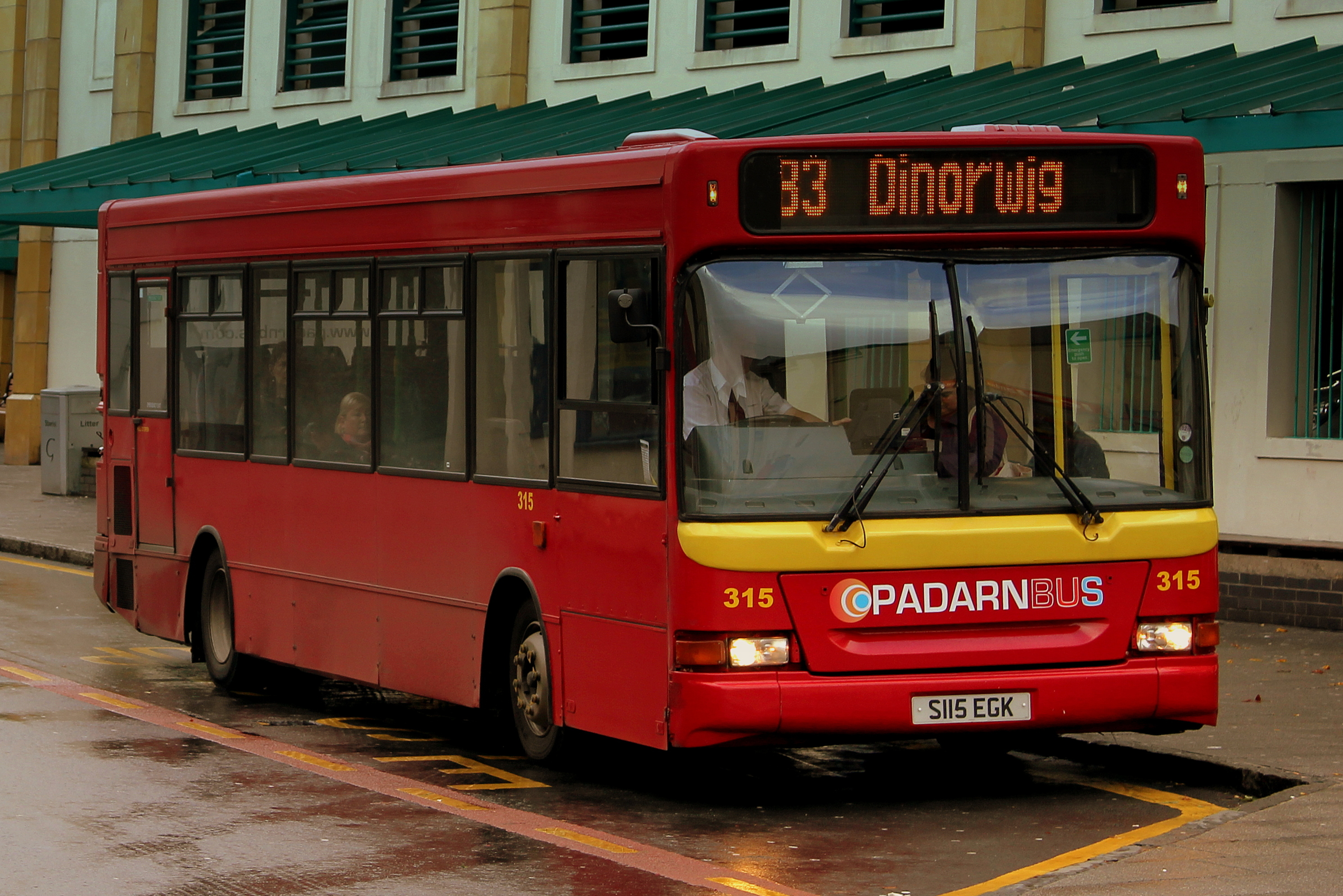
- Plaxton Pointer 2 bodied Dennis Dart SLF at Caernarfon bus station in October 2013
- Parent: Charles Price
- Founded: 1979; 47 years ago
- Ceased operation: 30 May 2014; 11 years ago
- Headquarters: Llanberis
- Service area: Gwynedd
- Service type: Bus services
- Routes: 21 (October 2013)
- Fleet: 47 (October 2013)
- Website: www.padarnbus.co.uk - Web Archive

Padarn Bus was a bus company based in Llanberis, Gwynedd. It operated 21 routes in North Wales plus three summer services in Snowdonia National Park. Many of its vehicles and routes were acquired when it merged with larger company KMP. The operator, who were being investigated by North Wales Police over allegations of fraud at the company, closed down on 30 May 2014.

== History ==
=== Creation and early growth (1979-2006) ===
The company was founded as a taxi firm in 1979 by Dafydd and Darren Price, moving into coach hire in 1984. The name is derived from the nearby lake, Llyn Padarn. Padarn began operating a tendered route in Bangor in 1989 as part of the Bws Gwynedd scheme. It won work on Anglesey a year later and launched two competing routes in Bangor with new Dennis Darts in 1991. However, in 1995, the loss of contracted work prompted the company to give up local service work, although some school contracts continued.

In 2003, the company returned to local bus operation by winning Conwy Council contracted route 75 Llandudno to Llanfairfechan, but was forced to give this up in January 2006 due to rising costs. However, in October 2005, it launched its first commercial route, hourly route 77 linking Bangor and Bethesda, and quickly followed this with a similar hourly route 76. This was reported to be at the request of local councillors unhappy with the parallel service provided by Arriva Buses Wales.

Later in 2006, passengers in the Maesgeirchen area of Bangor asked Padarn to provide a service as an alternative to Arriva's route; a half-hourly service numbered 71 was introduced as a result. Padarn also ran route 79 from Maesgeirchen to Parc Menai, which replaced the old 79 service which was previously operated by Arriva.

=== Expansion and closure (2007-2014) ===
In 2007, Ken Williams, the manager of 34-vehicle independent KMP of Llanberis, announced that he wished to sell the business. Padarn were interested in buying KMP as Darren Price had previously worked at the company, but could not afford to buy the whole of KMP. In August 2008, Arriva Buses Wales purchased part of KMP, including seven vehicles and route 9 from Caernarfon to Llandudno.

The remainder of KMP was sold to Padarn in April 2009. It had been intended that the deal should occur several months earlier, but it had been delayed owing to a lack of funding due to the credit crunch. The acquisition took the combined fleet size to 36 vehicles operating a total of 18 routes and safeguarded 50 jobs. Padarn Bus continued to grow over the following three years, with its fleet standing at 49 vehicles in July 2012, of which eight were coaches.

In 2014, North Wales Police confirmed that two people connected with the company were arrested on allegations of fraud. The company announced it would cease operations at midnight on 30 May, blaming its closure on lost contracts following a police inquiry. 84 staff were employed at the time. Many of the Padarn's routes passed to other operators in the area, while some were not replaced as they were already covered by existing services.

== Fleet ==
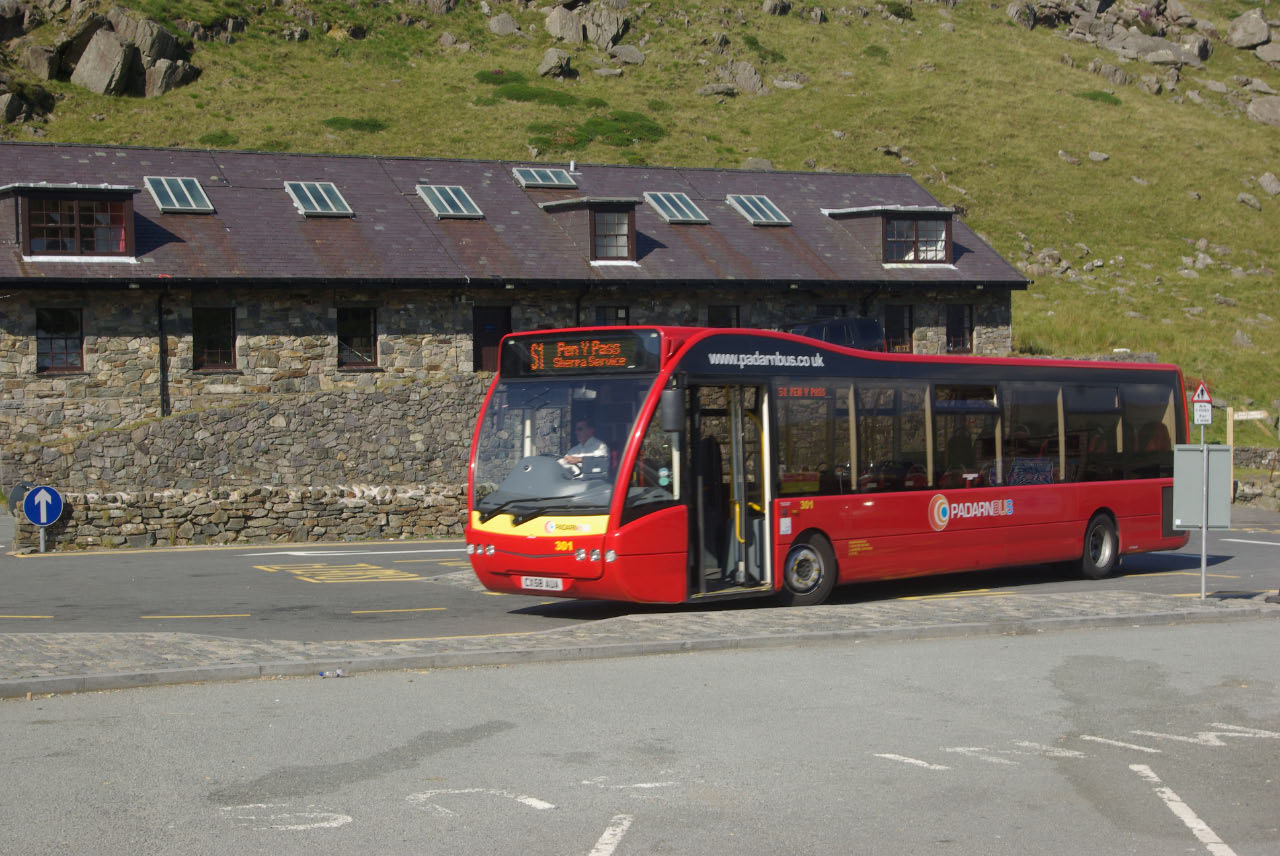
Optare Versa at Pen-y-Pass on route S1 in July 2011

As of October 2013, the Padarn Bus fleet consisted of 47 vehicles. The bus fleet operated regular services consisted of seventeen Dennis Darts, several of which were low floor, two Mercedes-Benz Varios, two Mercedes-Benz 811Ds, four Alexander Dennis Enviro200s, six Optare Solos, an Optare Versa and two Volvo B6BLEs.

Double deck vehicles in the fleet were three Leyland Olympians, four Volvo Olympians and a single MCW Metrobus. An open-top Leyland Atlantean new to Plymouth Citybus was used on routes S1 and S2 in the Snowdonia National Park in the summer.

Padarn had bought additional vehicles at a rate of one a year between 2006 and 2008. The KMP purchase included 26 vehicles, joining ten which had previously been owned by Padarn. In late April 2009 the newly enlarged company bought its first new vehicle, an Optare Versa for route 77. Three integral Wright StreetLite midibuses entered service in late 2010 for use on contracted routes on Anglesey. The StreetLites were withdrawn and returned to the dealer in May 2011 due to reliability issues. They were replaced by three new Alexander Dennis Enviro200s.
