= Maesgeirchen =

Coordinates: 53.22263°N 4.11642°W

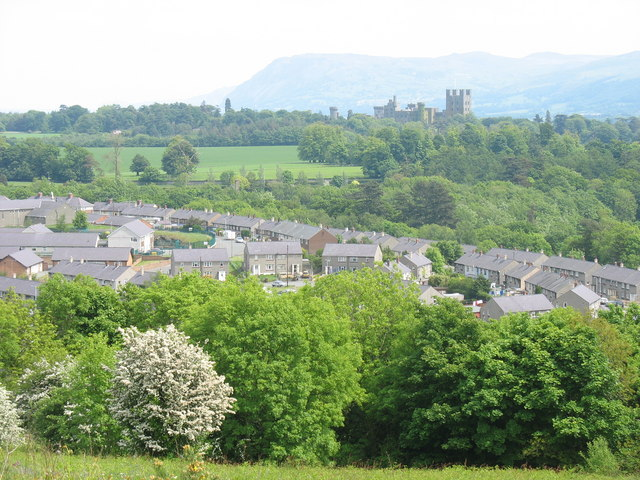

- Location within Gwynedd
- Population: 4,000
- Principal area: Gwynedd
- Preserved county: Gwynedd
- Country: Wales
- Sovereign state: United Kingdom
- Post town: BANGOR
- Postcode district: LL57
- Dialling code: 01248
- Police: North Wales
- Fire: North Wales
- Ambulance: Welsh
- UK Parliament: Bangor Aberconwy
- Senedd Cymru – Welsh Parliament: Arfon

Maesgeirchen is a suburb of Bangor and housing estate in Gwynedd, Wales, with roughly 4,000 inhabitants.

It is the third-largest single housing estate in Wales behind Gurnos, Merthyr Tydfil, the second largest and Caia Park in Wrexham, which is the largest with nearly 12,000 inhabitants.

The estate is located away from Bangor's main spread, being separated by Bangor Mountain. The name of the estate is often shortened to a simpler "Maes-G" in casual use, by residents of both the estate and the city.

North it goes over Bangor Mountain towards the city and south it goes through the nearby Llandegai industrial estate. Recently there have been major environmental works throughout the river area including walkways, paths, and picnic areas designed for use by pedestrians and wheelchair users.

The estate also boasts its own residents' organisation and 'communities first' division which is run by locals. It has a community centre (Ty Cegin, built with National Lottery funding as a Healthy Living Centre and later taken over by the local Communities First Partnership following cessation of five years of lottery funding), It used to have a social club, which closed in 2014, although plans were made to demolish it and replace it with a Costcutter convenience store in 2020.

== History ==
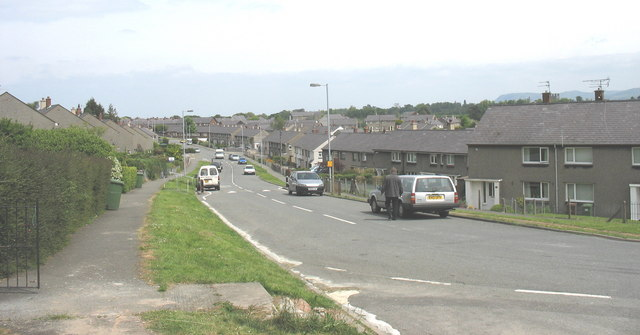
Penrhyn Avenue, Maesgeirchen

It was originally constructed in the late 1930s, with more homes being added after World War II and in recent years. It was named after the farm Maes-y-geirchen which settled near Queens Avenue. In 2002 the estate was fitted with CCTV, which covers most streets, In 2003, the local council-owned pre-war homes on the estate underwent an expansive home-improvement scheme funded by the council, which saw them all fitted with double-glazing and central heating, as well as maintenance and modernisation work to both the interior and exterior of the buildings.

== Transport ==
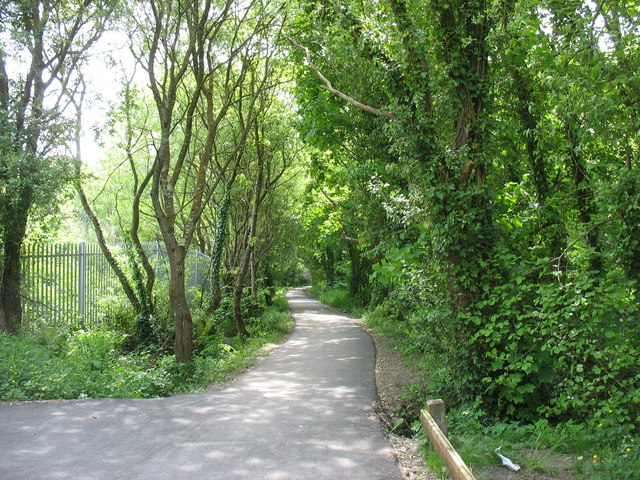
Path between the Maesgeirchen Housing Estate and the Llandegai Industrial Estate, formerly part of the Penrhyn Quarry Railway.

Bus services into the estate until 2006 were provided exclusively by Arriva Buses Wales, but starting in 2006 services from Padarn Bus commenced following a request by residents unhappy with Arriva's service, Following Padarn Bus ceasing operations in 2013, services returned to be exclusive to Arriva.
The estate has only one road entrance and exit, via "Maes-G Hill" (official road name: Penrhyn Avenue), which gives the residents of Maesgeirchen a strong sense of community. There are also numerous un-made footpaths leading to and from the estate; one called Lôn Felin Esgob (meaning "Bishop's mill lane") is an old highway with some of the paving still in place.
