= Felin Fawr Slate Works =

Coordinates: 53.1764°N 4.0738°W

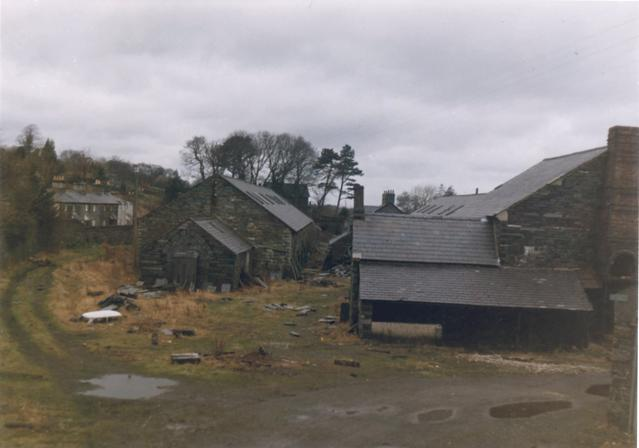
Penrhyn Quarry workshops, Coed y Parc, at the former meeting point between the main line of the 2' gauge railway to Porth Penrhyn and the internal quarry railway system, 1973.

Felin Fawr Works is a former slate works to Penrhyn Quarry Railway in Bethesda, Wales. It dates back to 1803; This is when the first mill was supposedly built. Felin Fawr closed in September 1965 with its current owners being Felin Fawr Cyf. Most of the buildings, if not all of them, are listed.

== History ==
The first building at Felin Fawr was the Western Slab Mill, constructed in 1803, shortly after the opening of the Penrhyn Railroad in 1801. The Second Slab Mill opening around 1830, followed by a foundry, engineering facilities, a quarry railway and several slate mills. There are several other buildings on the site.

== Present Day ==
In the present day Felin Fawr is currently owned by Felin Fawr Cyf with most of the buildings being rented out to a diverse range of local companies.

== Layout ==
The site has a number of buildings as shown above. There was also a lot of train track laid out around the site. Felin Fawr Cyf has restored a fraction of this track.

== Buildings and Structures ==
- Waterwheels-On the site there are two waterwheels. One of these mills is thought to be the oldest industrial waterwheel in Wales. It is thought to be built in c.1846. This does not tie in with when the Slab Mill was built as no one knows what would have powered it. The only possibility is that there was another waterwheel on the site before.
- Slab Mills-The first Slab Mill was built on the site in 1803 although many people, and documentary evidence, suggest it was built in 1865-6. This was because the belief WAS that it was built in 1803 though, as it says above, it may have been built in 1865-6.
- Locomotive Shed-The Locomotive Shed is a slate slab-built shed. The loco shed is believed to date from shortly after the introduction of steam on the main line in December 1875 (when steam was introduced onto the line).
