= Glasinfryn =

Coordinates: 53.197°N 4.117°W

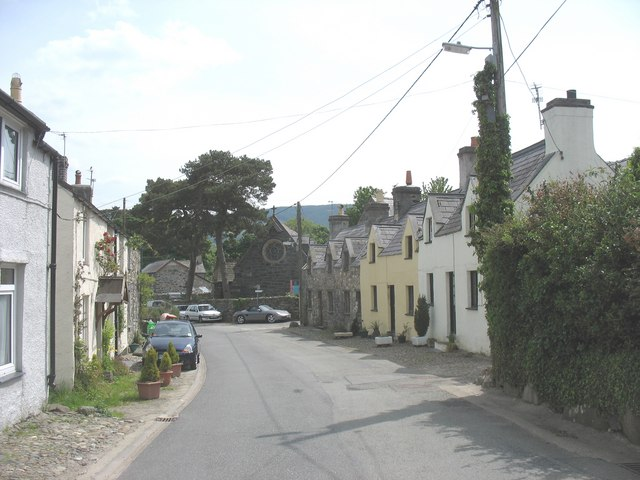
- High Street, Glasinfryn

- Location within Gwynedd
- OS grid reference: SH585687
- Community: Pentir
- Principal area: Gwynedd
- Country: Wales
- Sovereign state: United Kingdom
- Post town: BANGOR
- Postcode district: LL57
- Dialling code: 01248
- Police: North Wales
- Fire: North Wales
- Ambulance: Welsh
- UK Parliament: Bangor Aberconwy
- Senedd Cymru – Welsh Parliament: Arfon

Glasinfryn is a small village in Gwynedd, Wales. It is situated between the village of Tregarth and the city of Bangor, Gwynedd, and in the community of Pentir. The village is residential in nature but with many outlying farms.

It is noted for having two bridges: one carries the old Bethesda to Bangor railway trackbed on an attractive Victorian architecture viaduct; the other is a concrete flyover built in the 1980s carrying the A55.

It is credited as the start of the A4244 road, but in reality the road lies approximately 1 kilometre (0.62 mi) south of the village. "Infryn" means turf, therefore the name of the village means literally "blue/green turf".
