= Bethesda branch line =

Railway line in Wales

The Bethesda branch line was a 4 1/4-mile (6.8 km) railway branch line between Bangor and Bethesda in Gwynedd, North Wales. Its primary purpose was to bring quarried slate down to the main line for onward transport.

It opened in July 1884, and a local passenger service was run as well as trains for the mineral traffic.

Intense road competition led to the cessation of ordinary passenger services in 1951; goods traffic and occasional passenger excursion journeys kept the line going until its complete closure in July 1962.

== Conception ==
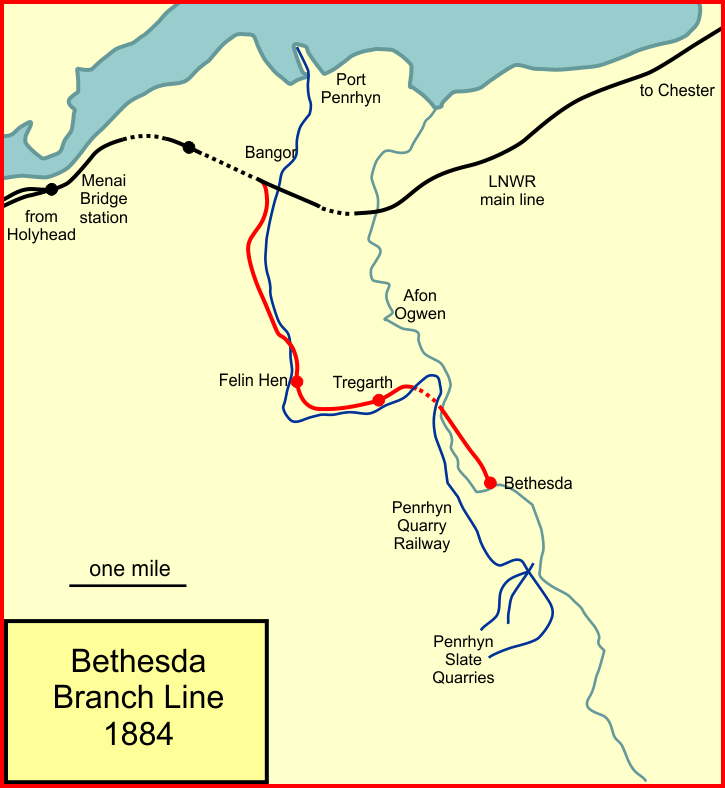
The Bethesda branch line in 1887

The Chester and Holyhead Railway opened its main line in 1850. Its main objective was to convey the Irish mail traffic, and at the time intermediate traffic was expected to be insignificant.

Quarrying was a significant industry in Bethesda: the local quarries were known as Penrhyn Quarry, and they were served by a narrow gauge line, the Penrhyn Railway, opened in 1801. The slate was conveyed to Port Penrhyn, immediately east of Bangor for onward transport to market. The Penrhyn line had inclined planes. In 1852 a standard gauge line was built in partial substitution for the narrow gauge line.

Bethesda was situated on Thomas Telford's road to Holyhead, so road communication was already unusually good for the early period.

A line was proposed in 1866 for a line between Bangor and Llanberis through Bethesda, but it failed in Parliament. A similar scheme for a narrow gauge line was put forward in 1871 but it too failed.

Nevertheless, there was local demand for a standard gauge railway connection, and a branch line from a junction with the Chester and Holyhead line near Bangor was authorised by Parliament on 6 August 1880. By now the Chester and Holyhead Railway had been absorbed into the London and North Western Railway.

== Opening ==
The line was duly built by the LNWR and opened for passenger traffic on 1 July 1884, and for goods trains on 1 September 1885.

== 1895 passenger service ==
Bradshaw's Guide for 1895 shows the passenger trains service: there were four trains each way weekdays, with an additional later train each way on Saturdays.

The passenger train service was six trains each way daily, but railmotors were introduced in 1908 and the service was increased to 16 daily, 9 on Sunday by the 1930s.

== After 1923 ==
In 1923 the main line railways of Great Britain were grouped in to one or other of four new, large concerns, under the Railways Act 1921. The LNWR was a constituent of the new London Midland and Scottish Railway. In 1948 a further restructuring took place, when the four railways including the branch were nationalisation under the Transport Act 1947, and combined into British Railways.

After World War II the passenger use of the line had reduced considerably; more convenient buses to Bangor used the Telford road, and passenger trains were withdrawn on 3 December 1951. Occasional excursions ran after that date, as the area had a certain beauty, but the line closed completely on 7 October 1963.

== Topography ==
The line climbed all the way from the main line, rising for much of the way at 1 in 40.

Tregarth Tunnel was on the line, just below Bethesda. It is 279 yd (255 m) in length.

Location list: all stations opened 1 July 1884; closed 3 December 1951:

- Bethesda Junction, diverging from the main line to Chester;
- Felin Hen;
- Tregarth;
- Bethesda.
