= Port Penrhyn =

Coordinates: 53.2347°N 4.1113°W

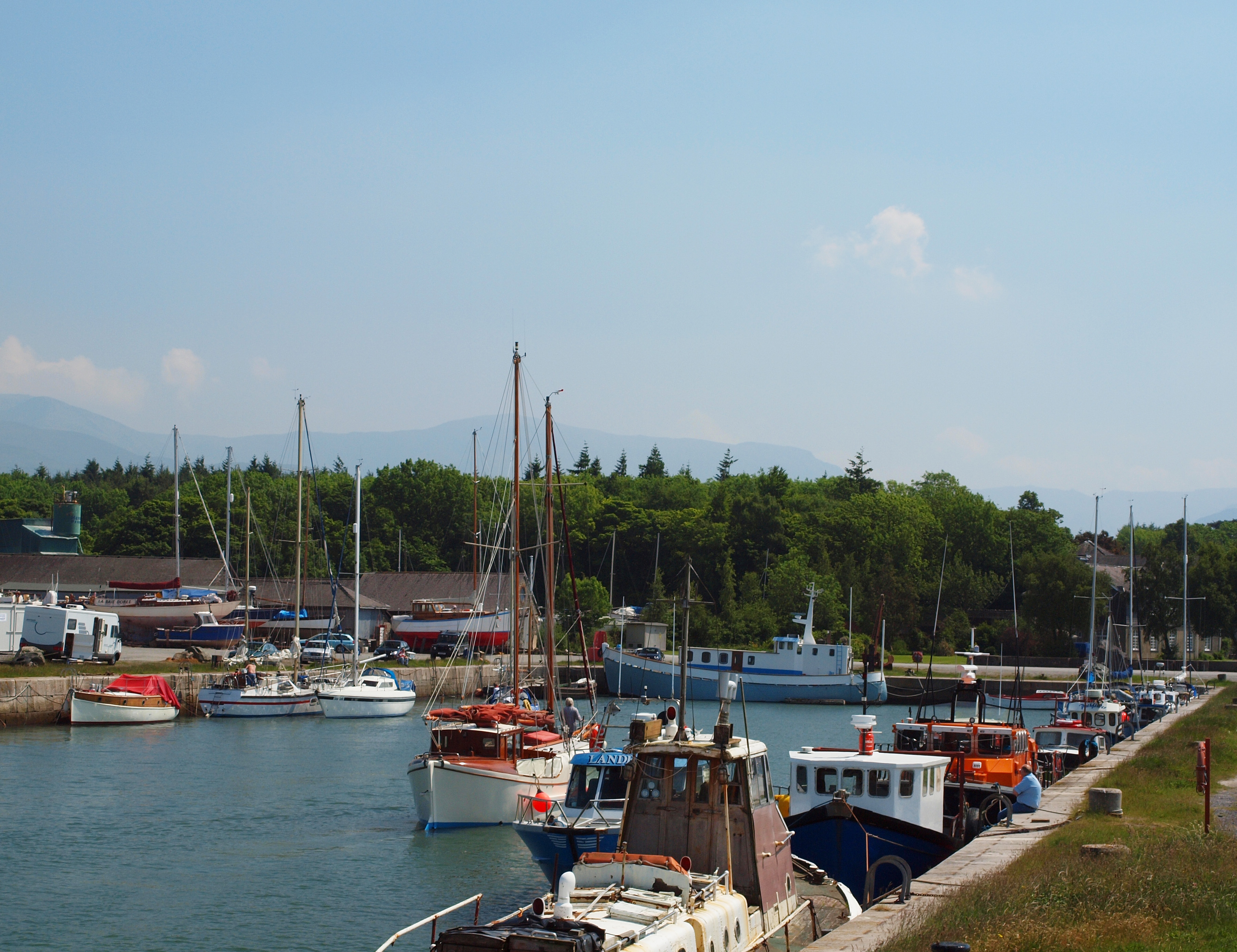
Port Penrhyn in June 2011

Port Penrhyn (Welsh: Porth Penrhyn) is a harbour located just east of Bangor in north Wales at the confluence of the River Cegin with the Menai Strait. It was formerly of great importance as the main port for the export of slate from the Penrhyn Quarry, the largest slate quarry in the world at the end of the nineteenth century. The quarry and the port were connected by the Penrhyn Quarry Railway.

It was built, and later expanded, by the Pennant (later Douglas-Pennant) family of the nearby Penrhyn Castle.

Penrhyn is the Welsh word for 'promontory'.

The port is used by coastal vessels up to about 3,000 tonnes deadweight (DWT) and by fishing vessels.
