= Penrhyn Quarry Railway =

Railway line

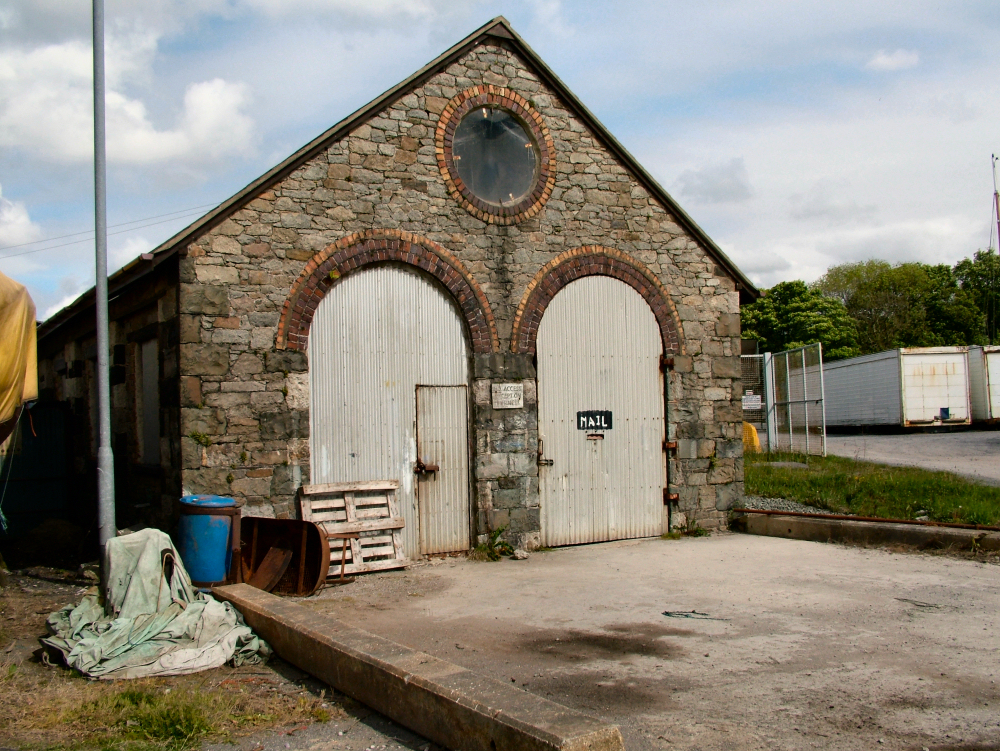
- The railway's locomotive sheds at Port Penrhyn

Overview
- Headquarters: Orig.: The Quarry Office, Port Penrhyn, Bangor; New: Felin Fawr, Bethesda
- Locale: Wales
- Dates of operation: 1801–1962
- Successor: Penrhyn Rail Ltd

Technical
- Track gauge: 1 ft 10 3/4 in (578 mm)
- Previous gauge: 2 ft 1/2 in (622 mm) (until 1879)

The Penrhyn Quarry Railway was a narrow-gauge railway in Caernarfonshire (now Gwynedd), Wales. It served the Penrhyn quarry near Bethesda, taking their slate produce to Port Penrhyn, near Bangor. The railway was around six miles (9.7 km) long and used a gauge of 1 ft 10 3/4 in (578 mm).

The railway opened in June 1801 and was one of the earliest overground narrow gauge railways in the world. It closed on 24 July 1962, the track being lifted in 1965 and sold to the Ffestiniog Railway.

In 2012, a section of the railway was restored at Felin Fawr and regular services were run beginning in February 2017. In July 2017, the railway closed just ahead of the fifth anniversary of operations.

== History ==
=== Llandegai Tramway (1798–1831) ===
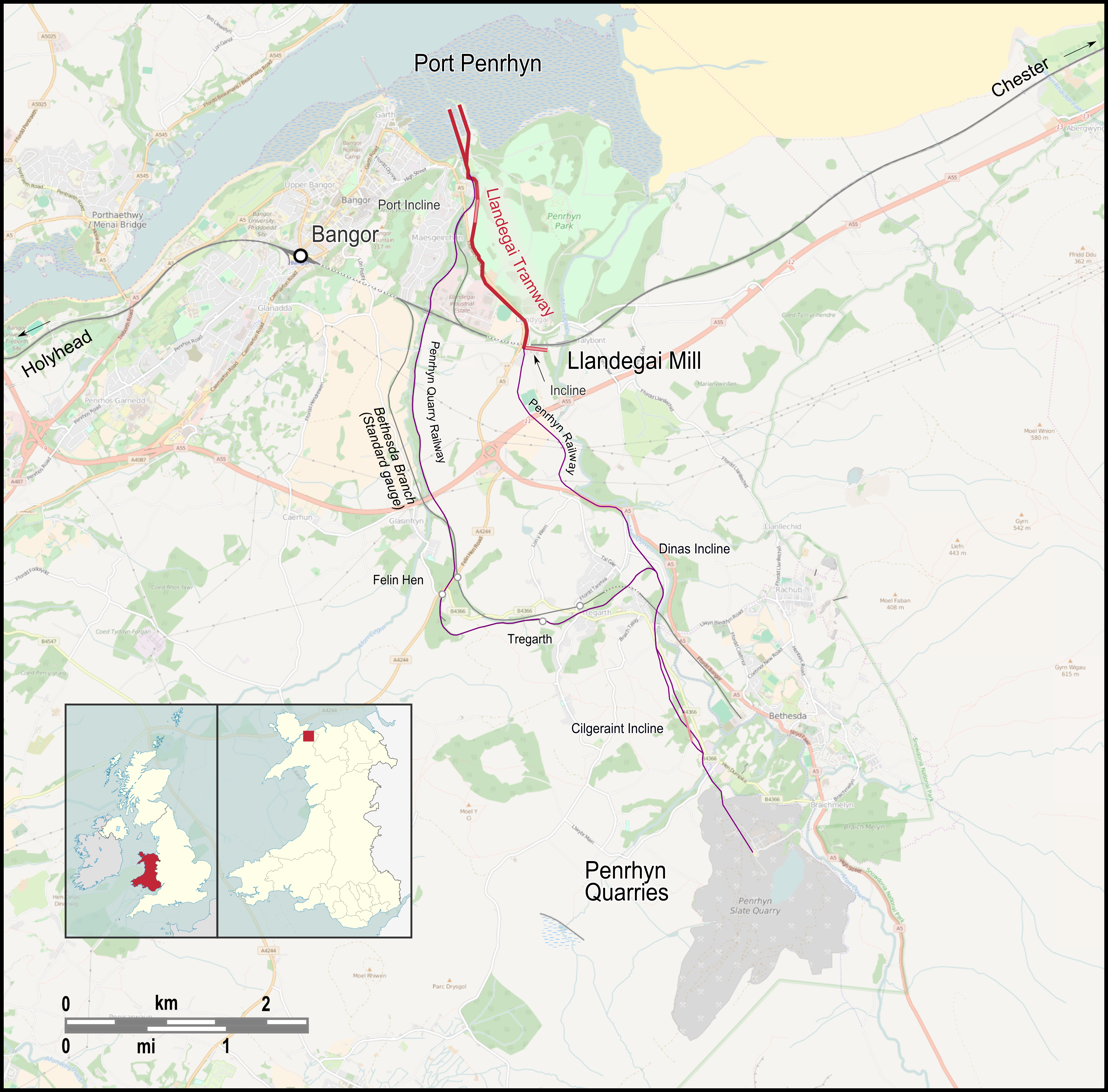
Possible route of the Llandegai Tramway

Author James Boyd suggests that the earliest predecessor to the Penrhyn Quarry Railway was the 1 mile (1.6 km) long 2 ft 1/2 in (622 mm) gauge Llandegai Tramway, built in 1798. The tramway connected the Penlan Mill at Llandegai with Port Penrhyn. The mill ground flint shipped in from Sussex into a powder, which was then shipped on to a pottery in Liverpool. The tramway would have been was one of the earliest overground railways in Britain. It included two balanced gravity inclines one from the floor of the Cegin valley near Llandegai to the hills above Bangor, the other dropping from there to the mill. Both inclines used vertically mounted winding drums. Research in 2021 suggests the tramway may not have existed.

=== Penrhyn Railroad (1801–1878) ===
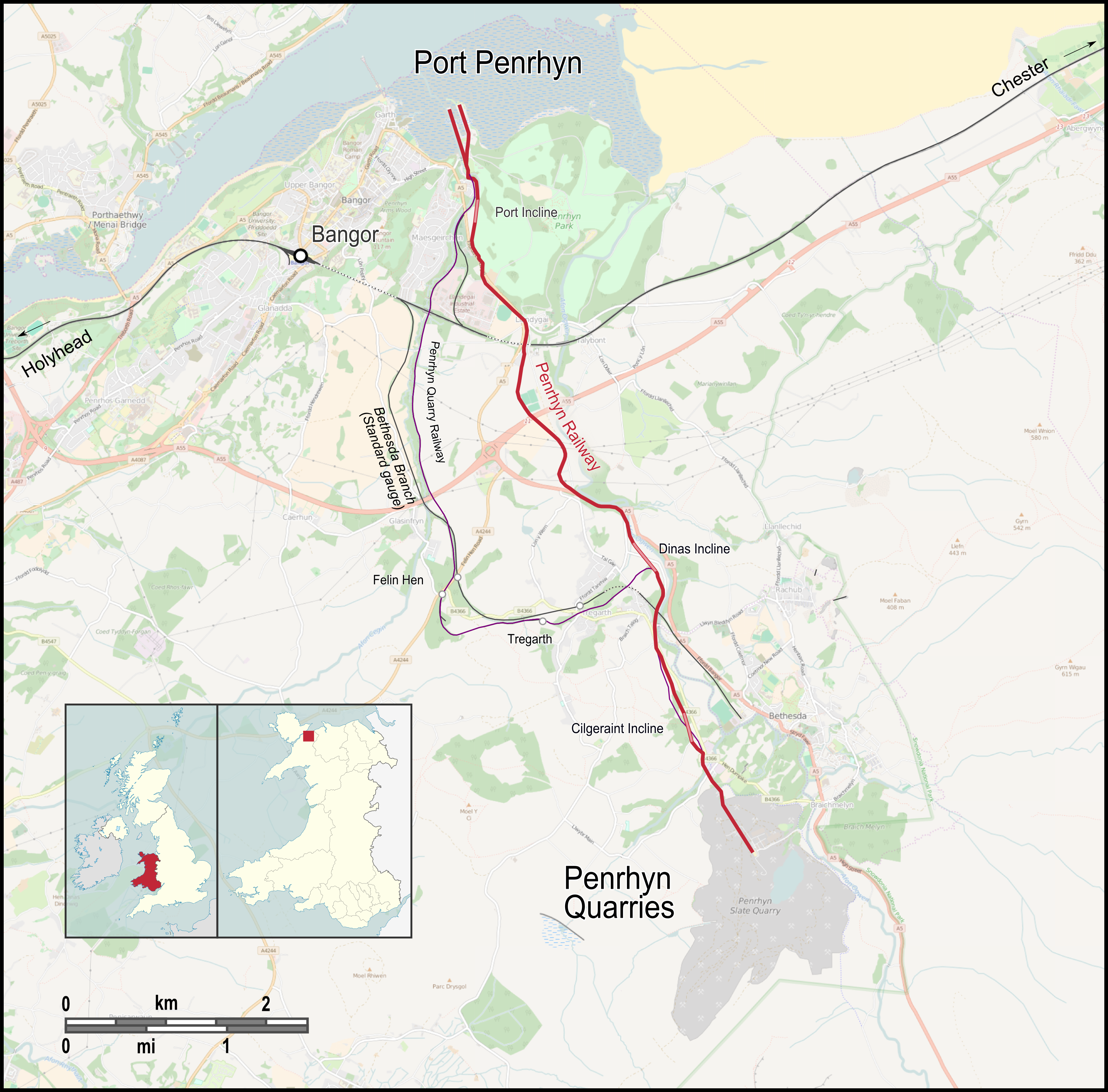
Penrhyn Railroad

In 1793, William Jessop suggested that the owners of the Penrhyn Quarry build a tramway to connect the quarry to the sea at Port Penrhyn. Jessop and his partner Benjamin Outram were then constructing the Little Eaton Gangway in Derbyshire. Samuel Wyatt was also involved in the construction of the gangway, and his brother Benjamin was the Penrhyn estate manager. Before the railroad was constructed, slate was transported to the port by horses along slow and difficult mountain paths.

Benjamin Wyatt was put in charge of building the tramway. Construction started on 2 September 1800, with the first slate train travelling on 25 June 1801. The line cost £170,000 to build. The track used oval rails designed by Benjamin Wyatt, and their quoted gauge of 2 ft 1/2 in (622 mm) was measured between the centres of the rails. The railroad was operated by horse power along with gravity and three balanced inclines – "Port" (sometimes called "Marchogion"), "Dinas" north east of Tregarth and "Cilgeraint" a short distance north of Coed-y-Parc workshops in Bethesda. The longest was 220 yards (200 m). The cost of transport fell from 4 shillings per ton using horses with panniers, to 1 shilling using the railroad.

In 1832, Wyatt's oval rails were replaced with more conventional T-rails. The gauge of this new track was 1 ft 10 3/4 in (578 mm), measured between the inner edges of the rails - the conventional way of measuring track gauge.

In 1868, Charles Easton Spooner, who had been responsible for introducing steam locomotives on the nearby Festiniog Railway wrote to Lord Penrhyn proposing that he replace the railroad with a new line with steam haulage. Spooner was commissioned to survey a suitable route in 1872. The quarry suffered a strike in 1874, which slowed down plans to replace the railroad, but in July 1875 the decision was made to build a new railway and introduce steam. In 1877, two De Winton were delivered from Caernarfon to the port. They were steamed there on 22 June.

Construction of the new railway started on 7 March 1878 at the port. Contractor Richard Parry and civil engineer Robert Algeo were in charge of building a completely new railway that took a more circuitous route to the quarry but avoided the need for any inclines. The work was planned to take two years but was completed early. The first steam-hauled train on the new Penrhyn Quarry Railway on 3 October 1879.

=== Penrhyn Quarry Railway (1878–1962) ===
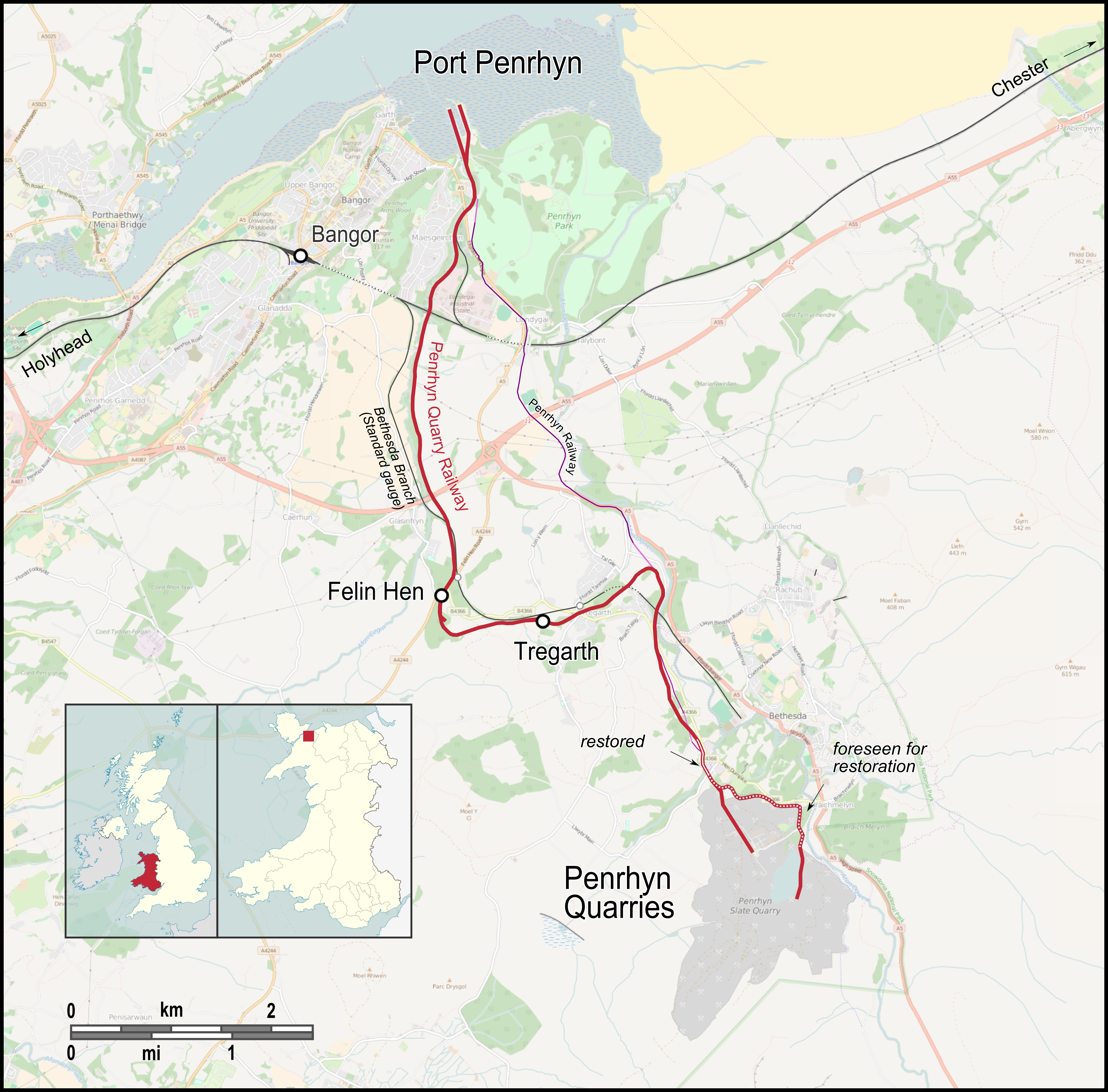
Penrhyn Quarry Railway

The first locomotives used on the new railway were three De Winton's with horizontal boilers. Although successful, these locomotives were not powerful enough for the substantial traffic that passed down the line. In 1882 the railway ordered 'Charles', a large 0-4-0ST from Hunslet. Charles proved very successful and was followed by 'Blanche' and 'Linda' in 1893 to the same basic design. These locomotives were the mainstay of the railway for the rest of its life.

There was a significant demand for building materials after the First World War, as Britain recovered from the conflict and many new houses were built to replace slums. The slate industry had been largely mothballed during the conflict, but now found itself in a boom period. Shortly after the war, the quarry began producing Fullersite - ground slate waste - which was shipped in large quantities along the railway. In 1924, with traffic continuing the rise, three additional Baldwin locomotives were purchased. These had been built for war use by the United States Army Transport Corp, and were refurbished before being sold to the railway, but were not successful, and after three years of intermittent use they were put aside.

Immediately after the Second World War, there was a short boom in demand for Welsh slate, to meet reconstruction needs throughout the United Kingdom. However this proved to be a short-lived period of success, and cheap foreign imports of slate and new man-made roofing materials quickly began to eat into the market for the higher-quality and more expensive Penrhyn product. A steady decline in traffic through the 1950s and growth in the use of roads for transporting slates direct from the quarry to market meant the end of the railway was inevitable. In June 1962, the last slate train ran, though a few unofficial trips were run as late as the summer of 1963.

=== Traffic and rolling stock ===
Heading seawards (northwards) from the quarry at Bethesda the first (Cilgeraint) incline was bypassed by building an almost parallel straight line at a gentler end-to-end gradient whose foot was some distance north of the foot of the incline. A similar approach was not feasible for the other two inclines, so the traditional approach was taken – to increase the length of the line to spread the grade. The old route was retained to the head of the Dinas Incline where the new line swung through 180 degrees in a horseshoe bend, thereby changing from heading northeast to southwest. It then swung past a new halt at Tregarth before swinging northwards again past a new halt at Felin Hen, whereafter the line headed more or less straight for Port Penrhyn, meeting the original alignment below the foot of the Marchogion Incline.

The main line's primary purpose was to carry finished slates and Fullersite (powdered slate) to Port Penrhyn where they were loaded onto ships or, from February 1852 when the Chester and Holyhead Railway opened its Port Penrhyn Branch, onto standard gauge trains. The ships and standard gauge trains took the products to national and international markets. Secondary traffic consisted of slate materials which were finished at workshops at Port Penrhyn into bitumen blocks and, notably, writing slates on which the port had a British near-monopoly in the 1930s. Paying backloads were few, but sufficient coal was brought from the port to the quarries to warrant the company buying a fleet of 50 coal wagons. The line also carried internal user traffic such as spare parts. The intermixing of standard and narrow gauge lines at the port produced some remarkable pointwork.

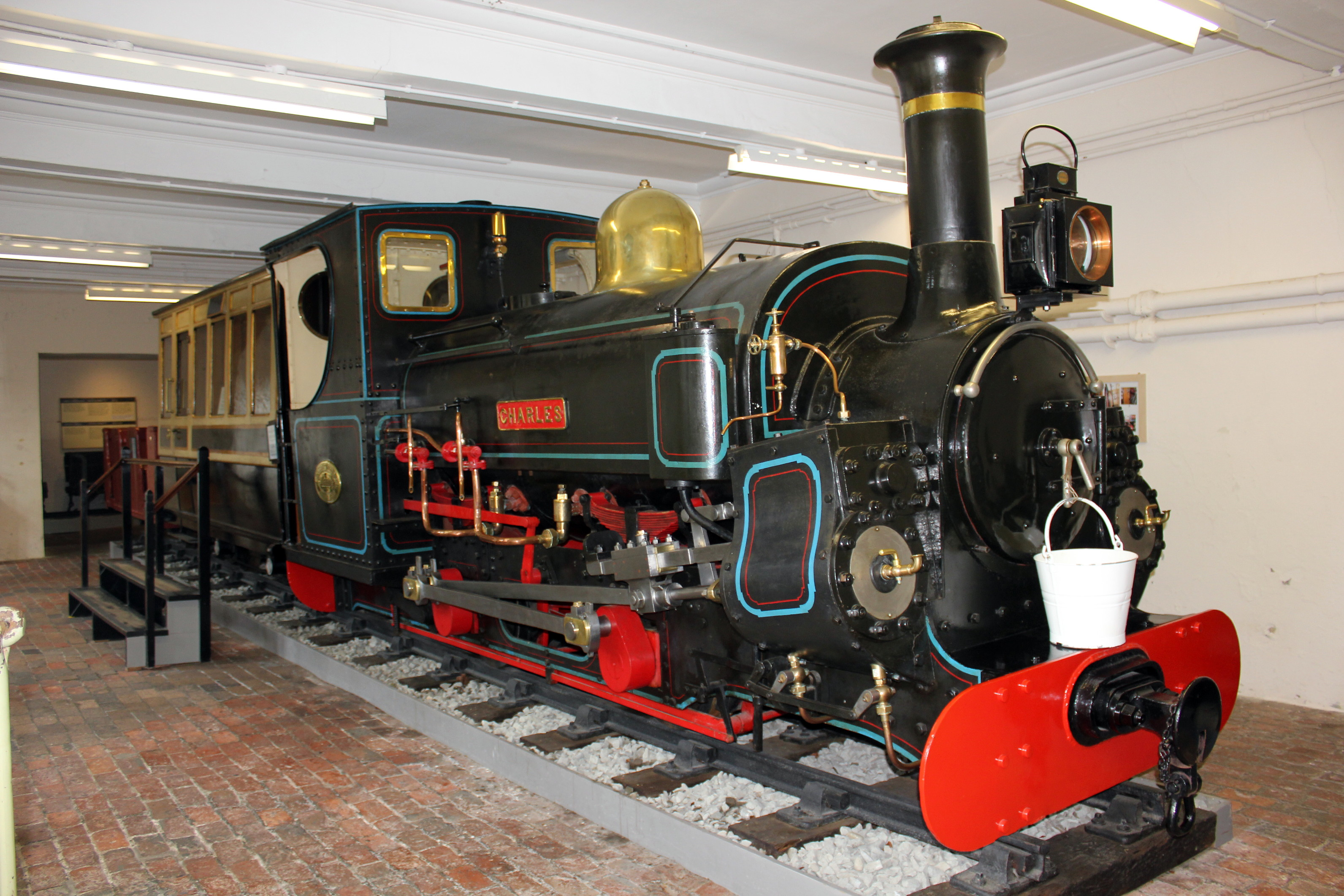
Main line locomotive Charles with Lord Penrhyn's saloon at the Penrhyn Castle Railway Museum

Lord Penrhyn had his own saloon coach, which has survived into preservation. An example of the second type of passenger vehicle – an Incline Carriage – has survived in the Penrhyn Castle Railway Museum. It was intended for conveying visitors and guests round the quarry itself, having inclined seats for comfort when travelling up and down inclines between levels.

Workmen's trains were provided, along with specials for visitors and dignitaries, but the railway never provided a public passenger service. The quarrymen's carriages were unsprung and open to the elements, having neither roofs nor doors. In the frequent event of rain and cold passengers usually covered themselves with sacks to keep out the worst. Each carriage could carry 24 quarrymen "at a pinch". The carriages resembled enlarged versions of many used on garden railways in fine weather. 16 of these were built in two batches between 1878 and 1908, each bore a single letter in the series A to P. The service was withdrawn on 9 February 1951, rendering the carriages redundant. Seven survived, six were given or sold to the Talyllyn Railway where they were modified or cannibalised to such an extent that no Penrhyn bodies survive there. The seventh survivor was acquired by the Penrhyn Castle Railway Museum, where it remained on view in 2016. Contradicting this to a degree is the Moseley Railway Trust which has carriage "O", which came into their hands after a long tour of various preservation sites, starting with Bressingham Steam and Gardens. The trust has also built a replica of carriage "H".

== Restoration ==
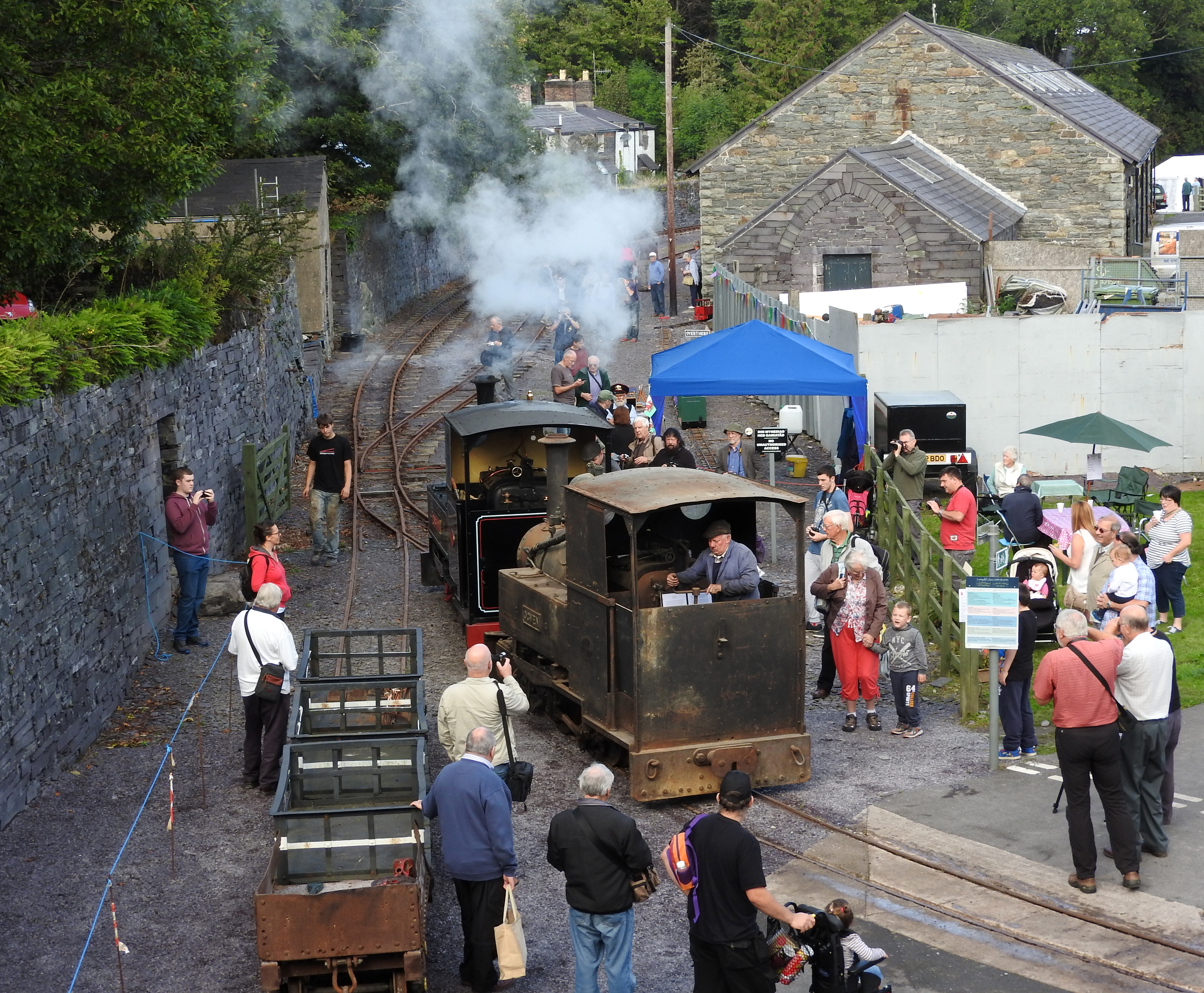
Heritage event on the restored tracks, 2015

Penrhyn Quarries Ltd completed the restoration of a section of the original railway at Felin Fawr, Bethesda in 2012, and further sections were planned.

The section of restored railway was approximately one-fifth mile (0.3 km) in length and ran between Coed y Parc bridge (Felin Fawr) (grid ref. SH 615662) and St. Anns (grid ref. SH 614661). A second phase of the restoration was planned which would add a further mile of track running in a southerly direction. "Open weekends" with public running were held annually from 2013 onwards. From 2016 onwards, a series of "Steam Galas" and regular weekend running with diesel locomotives took place.

The Penrhyn Quarry Railway Society is no longer involved with the team carrying out the restoration work, but continues to record and document the history of the railway. The rebuilding of the line, overseen by PQR Engineering Ltd and the operating company Penrhyn Rail Ltd, - was supported by the Penrhyn Railway Supporters, formed in 2013. To commemorate the 50th. anniversary of the closure of the original railway, original Penrhyn Quarry Hunslet locomotive 'George Sholto' was operated on the restored section.

In July 2017, all railway operations ceased at short notice and the rolling stock was removed from the site. The track remained in place in August 2017, though the lines leading to the loco shed and crossing the footpath, which were removed in September 2017.

== Main line locomotives ==
These are the locomotives that worked trains between the quarry and the port, often known as the "main line" locomotives.

No.	Name	Image	Builder	Type	Date built	Disposal	Notes
	Bronllwyd (or "Fronllwyd", previously named "Coctinor")		Valley Foundry, Holyhead	0-4-0VBT	1875	Scrapped 1906	Used in the construction of the railway by contractor Richard Parry
3	George Sholto		Stephen Lewin or De Winton or "Hughes"	0-4-2WT or 0-4-0T	1875	Scrapped 1880	Not to be confused with the 1909-built Hunslet, also named George Sholto, since preserved
	Edward Sholto		De Winton	0-4-0ST	1876	Scrapped 1907	Not to be confused with the 1909-built Hunslet, also named Edward Sholto, since preserved
	Hilda		De Winton	0-4-0T	1878	Scrapped 1911	
	Violet		De Winton	0-4-0T	1879	Scrapped 1911 (or 1902)	
	Charles		Hunslet	0-4-0ST	1882	Preserved at Penrhyn Castle Railway Museum, Bangor	Out of regular use since 1955, though did run one trip on 31 May 1963. Static display. Awaiting restoration.
	Linda		Hunslet	0-4-0ST	1893	Loaned to the Ffestiniog Railway in 1962, and sold to them in December 1963.	Rebuilt as a 2-4-0ST+T. In regular service.
	Blanche		Hunslet	0-4-0ST	1893	Loaned to the Ffestiniog Railway in 1962, and sold to them in December 1963.	Rebuilt as a 2-4-0ST+T. In regular service.
1	Llandegai		Baldwin	2-6-2PT	1916	Converted to stationary engine 1929, stored 1931, scrapped 1940.	ex-War Department Light Railways
2	Felin Hen		Baldwin	2-6-2PT	1916	Sold 1940 to Australia, now privately owned in France	ex-War Department Light Railways
3	Tregarth		Baldwin	2-6-2PT	1916	Withdrawn April 1928, scrapped 1940	ex-War Department Light Railways

== See also ==
- British narrow-gauge railways
- Talyllyn Railway which purchased several PQR carriages
- Lôn Las Ogwen
