= Fairy Falls =

Fairy Falls may refer to:

== New Zealand ==
- Fairy Falls (New Zealand)

== United States ==
- Fairy Falls (Oregon)
- Fairy Falls (Washington)

== Wales ==
- Fairy Falls, Trefriw
