= River Geirionydd =

River in Snowdonia, Wales

Coordinates: 53.130°N 3.850°W

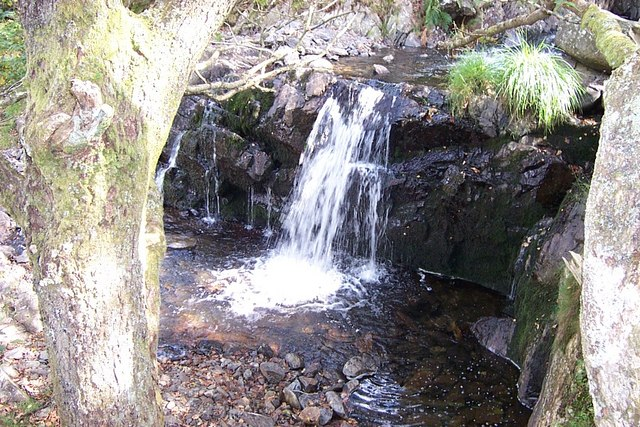
- The River Geirionydd near Klondyke mill
- Native name: Afon Geirionydd (Welsh)

Location
- Country: Wales

Physical characteristics
- Source: Llyn Geirionydd
- Mouth: confluence with Afon Crafnant

The River Geirionydd (Welsh: Afon Geirionydd) is a river in Snowdonia, North Wales. It is a tributary of the River Crafnant (Afon Crafnant), which flows over the Fairy Falls waterfall in Trefriw, and thence on into the River Conwy (Afon Conwy), which is the main river of the Conwy valley.

It flows from Llyn Geirionydd down a steep gorge before joining the river Crafnant. It is less than a mile in length.

The river passes the former Klondyke mill, which used its waters. Klondyke was a mining and milling complex connected with some of the metal mines of the Gwydir Forest by means of an old tramway which ran alongside Llyn Geirionydd. From above the mill wagons used to enter the building via an aerial ropeway.

The Welsh language poet, clergyman, antiquary and literary critic Evan Evans (Ieuan Glan Geirionydd, 1795–1855) was born on a freehold on banks of the river.

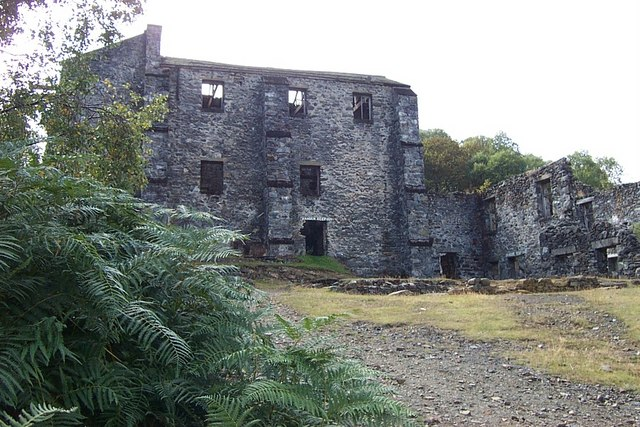
The ruins of Klondyke Mill today
