= Afon Crafnant =

River in north-west Wales

Coordinates: 53°7′57″N 3°52′12″W

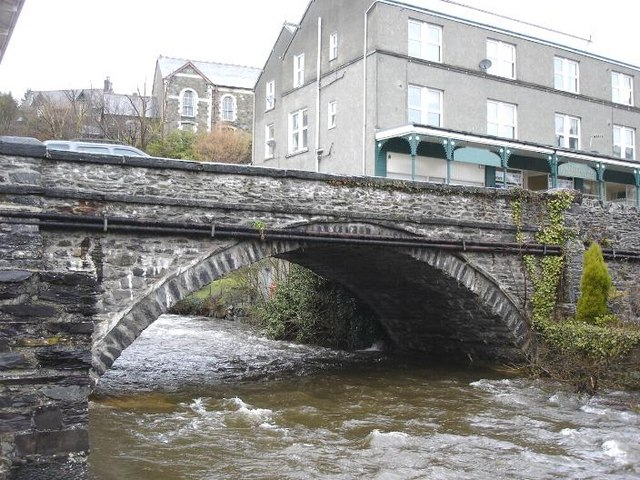
- The Afon Crafnant at Trefriw

Location
- Country: Wales

Physical characteristics
- Source: Llyn Crafnant
- Mouth: confluence with Afon Conwy
- Length: 2.5 mi (4.0 km)

Basin features
- Tributaries
  - right: Geirionydd

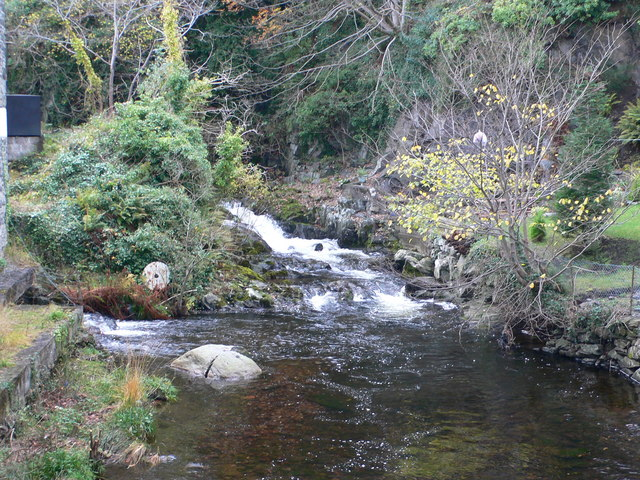
The Afon Crafnant at Trefriw

Afon Crafnant (Welsh for 'River Crafnant') is a tributary of the River Conwy, which is the main river of the Conwy valley in north-west Wales.

It flows from picturesque Llyn Crafnant, joining the river Conwy at Trefriw. It is about 2.5 miles (4.0 km) in length. The river Geirionydd is a tributary which flows from Llyn Geirionydd. They have a confluence a little below the former Klondyke Mill, which used water from both rivers. Klondyke was a mining and milling complex connected with some of the metal mines of the Gwydir Forest.

The Crafnant is also fed by a number of unnamed streams draining from Cefn Cyfarwydd, the ridge to the north-west.

At Trefriw some water from the river is extracted to pass through the Trefriw Woollen Mills to generate hydro-electricity for the machinery, after which the river flows over the Fairy Falls, a popular attraction.

Coed Crafnant, an area of woodland in the valley, is managed by the North Wales Wildlife Trust.

== Cwm Glas Crafnant ==
Cwm Glas Crafnant is a national nature reserve administered by Natural Resources Wales (formerly the Countryside Council for Wales) which lies at the head of the narrow Crafnant valley, beneath the rocky masses of Crimpiau and Craig Wen about 5 kilometres from Betws-y-Coed in Conwy. Partly surrounded by a ridge of volcanic rock, the reserve supports a range of habitats including woodland, marshland and cliffs. This quiet upland area is believed to be home to such species of threatened mammal as the red squirrel and pine marten.
