= Fairy Falls, Trefriw =

Waterfall in Conwy County Borough, Wales

Coordinates: 53.151°N 3.830°W

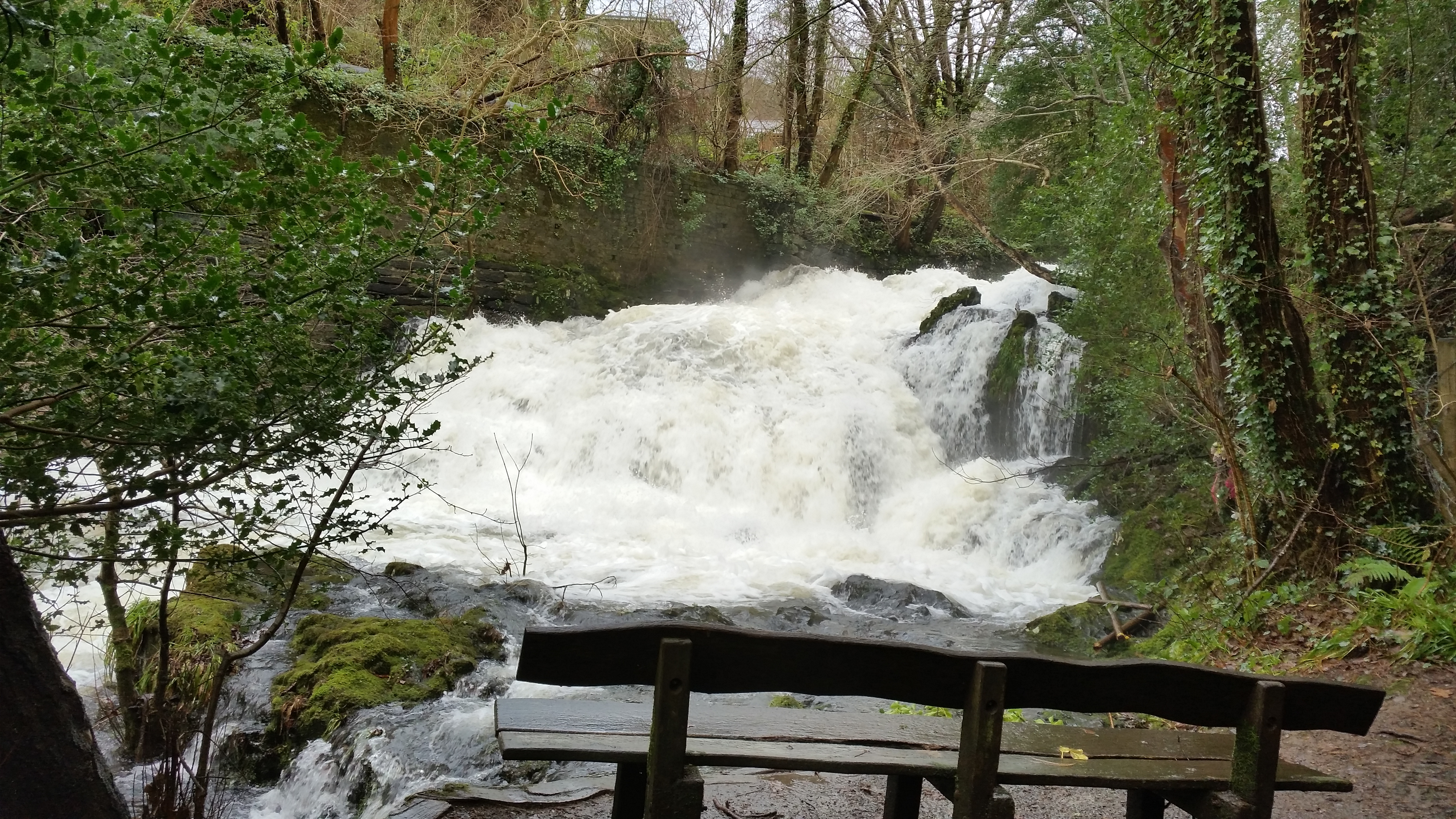
The Fairy Falls in Trefriw after heavy rainfall

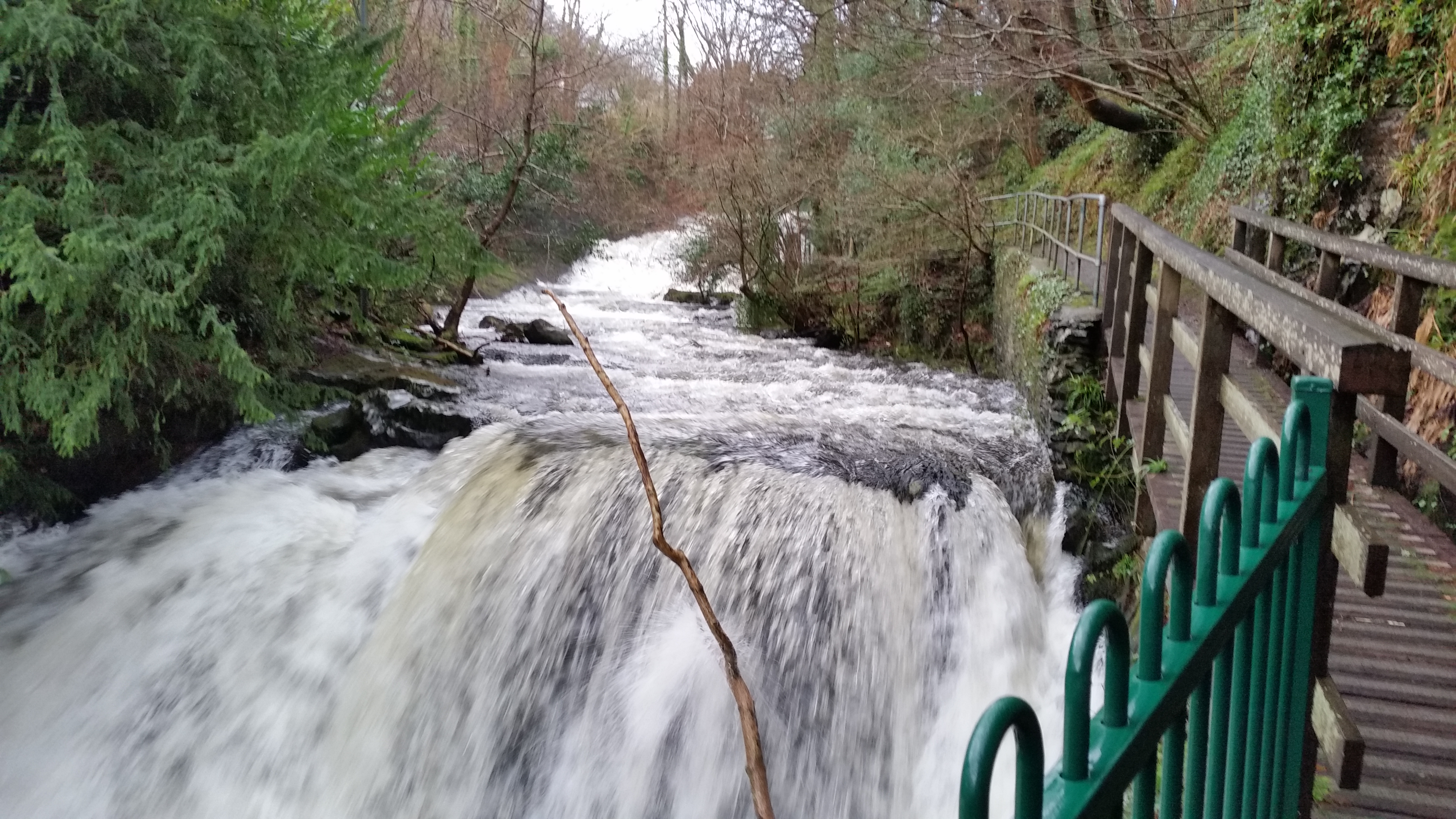
Below the Fairy Falls (seen in the distance)

The Fairy Falls (Welsh: Rhaeadr y Tylwyth Teg) is a waterfall in the village of Trefriw, north Wales. The falls are on the river Crafnant which has its source at Llyn Crafnant, being joined upstream by a tributary, the river Geirionydd. Below the falls the river Crafnant flows on to itself become a tributary of the river Conwy.

The main falls are about 25 feet high, the water falling down an angled rockface, and they were formed during the last ice age some 20,000 years ago. As the main glacier passed down the Conwy Valley, it truncated the Crafnant valley, leaving a hanging valley and this series of falls.

Not all of the water from the river Crafnant passes over the falls, as a little upstream some is diverted through a pipeline to provide hydro-electric power for the woollen mill. During drier periods this can leave the falls with little or even no water, but most of the year there is a good supply of water, as testified by the erosion of the rocks at the base of the falls.

Downstream of the main Fairy Falls are a number of further, lesser, falls, which old postcards also call the "Fairy Falls". Along this lower section of river the water once turned a number of waterwheels which powered various mills. The whole area of this series of falls—from the main falls through the lesser falls downstream—was known as "Fairy Glen", and was altogether more open than it is today. In Edwardian times there was a proper path alongside the river Crafnant, and a popular stroll was to walk from the banks of the river Crafnant, up through the well-known Fairy Glen, and on beside the river Crafnant up towards Llyn Crafnant.

Regarding the name, the information board beside the waterfall states: "The Trefriw Fairy Falls were named by the Victorians who were fascinated with fairies and identified many enchanting locations as home to these diminutive, mythical creatures." Whilst there are no documented sightings of fairies at the falls themselves, in 1880 Wirt Sikes referred to numerous local sightings of fairies in his book British Goblins.

The Fairy Falls pub in the village takes its name from the Falls.

The Falls are easily accessible on foot from various directions, and are on the route of one of the Trefriw Trails, a series of walks around the village and adjacent areas. Route 4, starting from the village shops, follows the riverside path through Fairy Glen and past the falls. Route 5 also takes this route before heading on to Llyn Geirionydd and Llyn Crafnant.

== See also ==
- List of waterfalls
- List of waterfalls in Wales
