= Klondyke mill =

Former ore processing mill in north Wales

Coordinates: 53°08′31.75″N 3°50′51.82″W

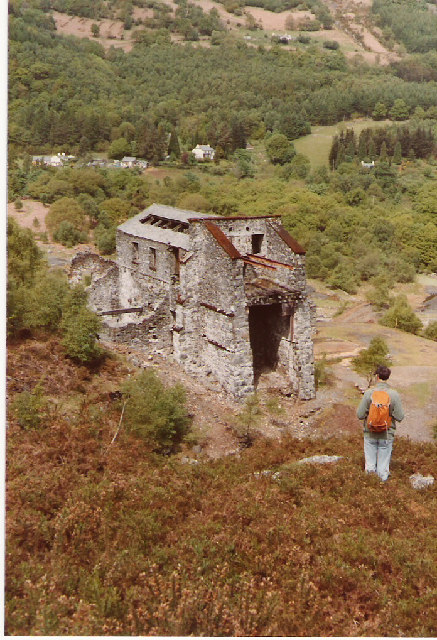
Klondyke mill viewed from the hill above

Klondyke Mill was an ore processing mill on the edge of the Gwydir Forest, near Trefriw, north Wales.

Constructed in 1900, the mill was built to receive lead ore (and some zinc ore) from Pandora mine, some 2 miles away – with which its history is inextricably linked – this ore travelling along a tramway which followed the eastern shore of Llyn Geirionydd. The mill saw little usage; Pandora mine was never profitable after construction of the mill, and the mine ceased operation in 1905. Klondyke mill itself closed in 1911 after having a short succession of optimistic owners.

In the 1920s, the mill achieved notoriety as the scene of an elaborate money-making scam, when investors were sought for the Klondyke mine, which was allegedly rich in silver. It is this scam which gives the mill its current name; during its years of operation it was initially known as Geirionydd Mill, then as the New Pandora Lead Works.

Today the mill lies in a ruined state, a tribute to the false optimism of the time, and is believed to be the largest upstanding building associated with lead mining in north Wales. It is a registered ancient monument and, despite its state of disrepair, is under the guardianship of Cadw, the only mine structure in the Gwydir Forest to be so designated.

== History ==
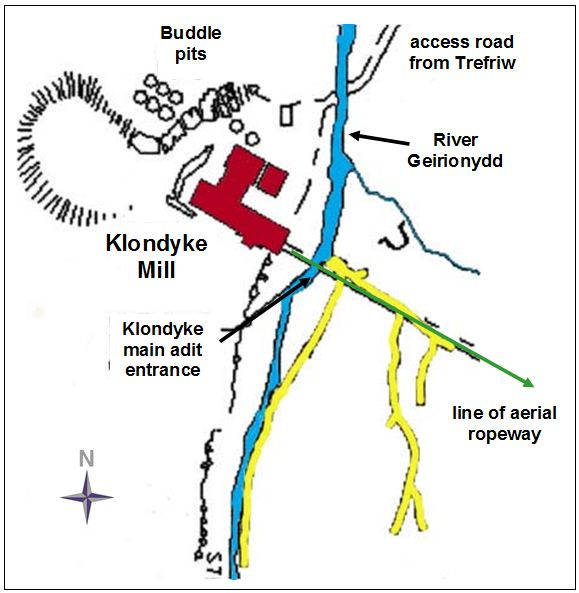
Sketch map showing the mill site, and the main Klondyke adit with tunnels off (in yellow)

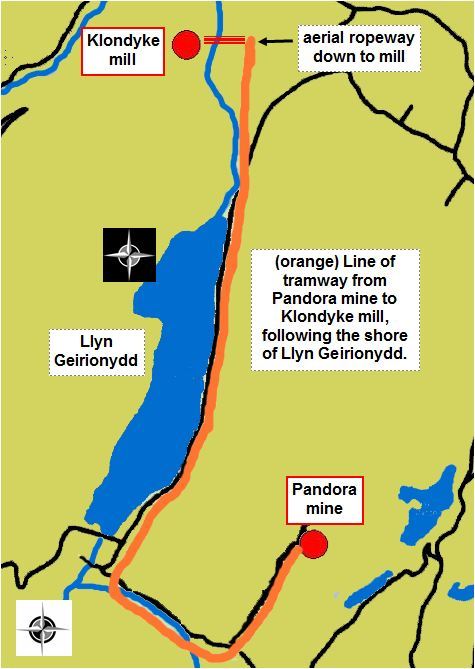
Sketch map showing Pandora mine and Klondyke mill, with the tramway connecting the two

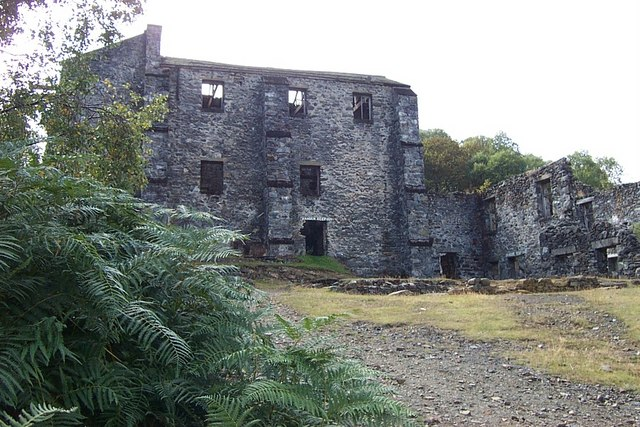
The mill ruins viewed from the north

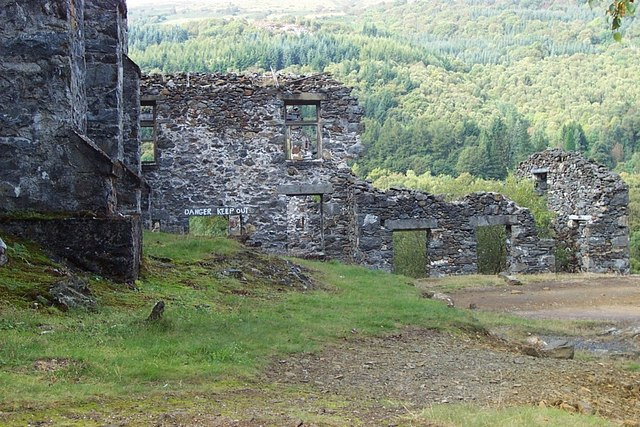
The mill ruins looking west, with the buttressed main building to the left

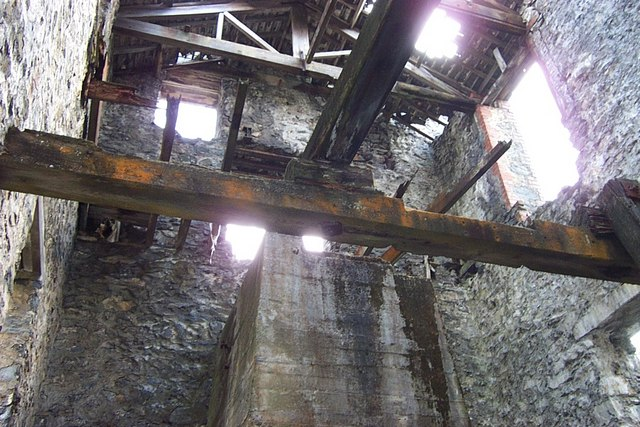
Inside the derelict mill today

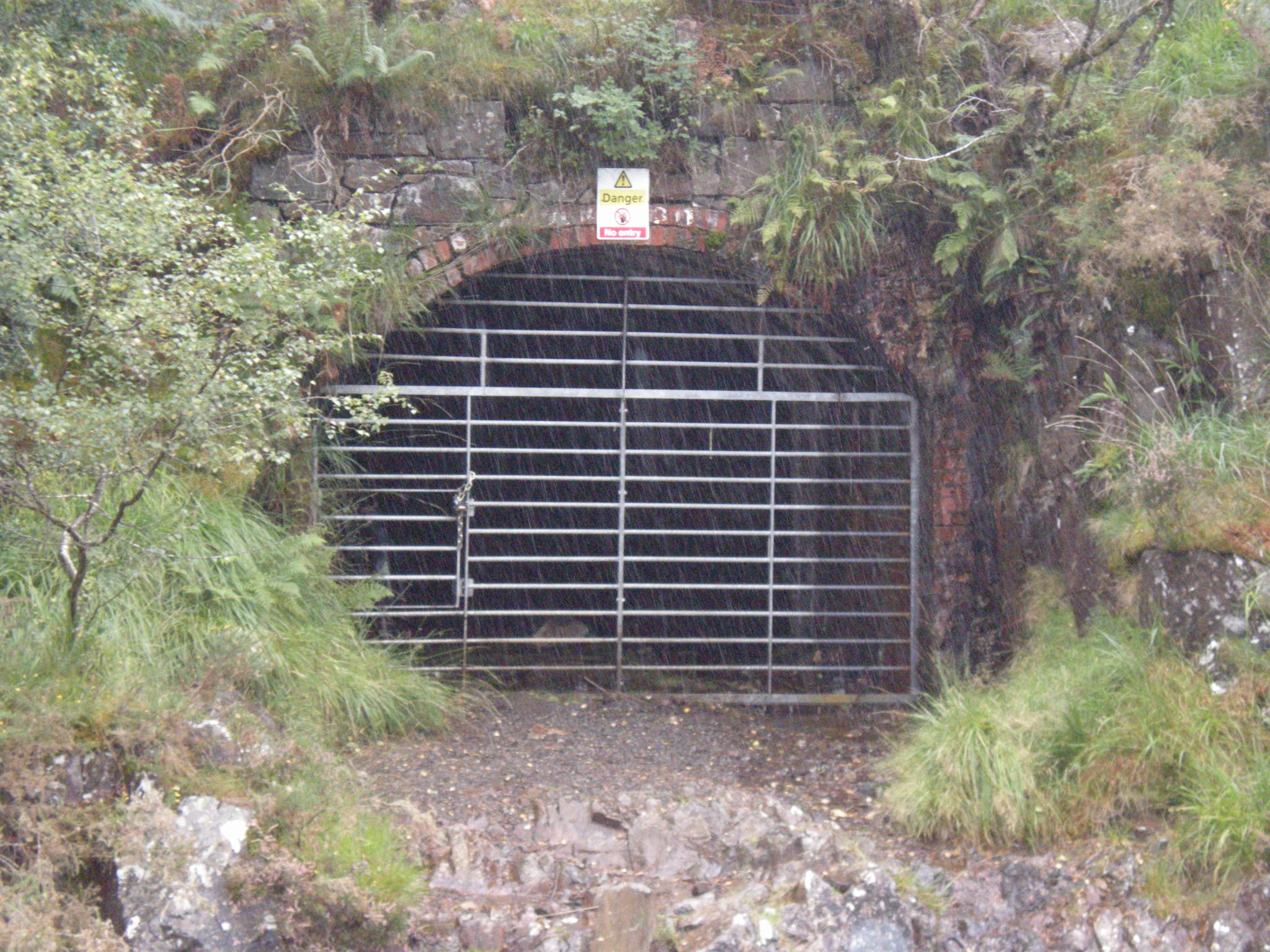
The barred entrance to Klondyke mine

The mill was built by the Welsh Crown Spelter Company, formed in 1899, and a subsidiary company of the English Crown Spelter Company (formed in 1883). (Quite simply, the English Company was involved in zinc smelting, for which it required large quantities of blende. To get supplies of this, the Welsh company was formed, which received assistance from the English Company in the shape of advances on loan. The Welsh company worked a number of mines in the area, having purchased them from previous owners, notably what is today most-commonly known as Pandora mine (though known successively as Willoughby Lead Mine, Welsh Foxdale Lead Mine, and New Pandora Lead Mine), which lies about 1.5 miles south-south-east. The company also developed the small mine known as Klondyke, adjacent to where the mill was built.

The company had grand plans for expanding the production of Pandora mine, which already had dressing floors immediately south of the lane (between Llyn Geirionydd & Capel Curig). Most prominent in the scheme was the construction of a new, large dressing mill at Klondyke, to which the ore would be carried on a 2-mile tramway, before descending by aerial runway from the hillside above into the upper floor of the mill itself. Much of this tramway was level, and it is known that the company had a 22 1/2" gauge Kerr Stuart petrol locomotive. It is logical to assume that it worked the tramway.

Both Pandora and Klondyke were to be state-of-the-art operations, heavily dependent on electricity. The lakes to the east of Pandora mine had previously provided a source of water, and a pipeline was now built directly downhill between Pandora and Lake Geirionydd, at the bottom of which was a small generating station. At the northern end of Lake Geirionydd, water was taken from the stream a little below its outflow from the lake, from where it travelled northwards in a newly constructed leat, alongside the tramway to a location directly above Klondyke mill. Here there was a large water tank, with a pipeline running down the hillside below the aerial ropeway. This water powered the turbine room at Klondyke.

In September 1901, a year after work had started on mill construction, George Grant Francis, consulting engineer to the parent company, reported to a shareholders' meeting of that company that they had, amongst other things at Pandora itself:

...Built two tanks in concrete of 2,250 cubic feet capacity each. Laid two pipe lines, one 15ins. diameter, 900ft. long, one 116ins. diameter, 800ft. long. ... Cut 3000 ft. of canals. repaired and put in order nine or ten reservoirs. Cut and laid over two miles of tram-lines in workings, and connecting mines and mill. Erected cable-way 700ft. long, 200ft. fall from tram-way to mill-house. erected mill-house, which was started in May 1900; two-thirds completed, and considerable portion blown down on Oct. 7th 1900; rebuilt with all machinery and turbine complete and capable of treating about 60 tons a day of 10 hours, and started on June 29th 1901. Built 3 reservoir dams capable of holding several million gallons of slimes and water, and laid down waggon road from Trefriw main road, about three-quarter mile long.

The company financed this development by issuing many thousands of un-issued shares.

The main north and south walls of the mill building are buttressed, and it is not known whether these buttresses were part of the original design, or whether they were added after the collapse mentioned above. Certainly they were needed, given the design of the building which only had solid walls on 3 sides - the western wall was timbered, and clad in corrugated iron. Apart from the cavernous main mill building, which housed the main equipment, i.e. stone-breaker, Cornish rolls, trommels and jigs machinery, the northern extension held Wilfley tables, and the most southerly part was the turbine room. The office was a separate building to the north, half-way to the road bridge.

Vehicle access to the mine was by a newly constructed road on the eastern side of the river Crafnant, as referred to by Francis above, and is now a public footpath. Although the metalled road to Llyn Crafnant had been built by this time (by Hugh Hughes of Tŷ Newydd, Trefriw, a quarry supervisor), access was shorter and more direct this way, crossing the river Geirionydd by a bridge a short distance from the mill. Although the bridge platform has long been removed, the bridge parapets remain in good condition.

=== Klondyke mine ===
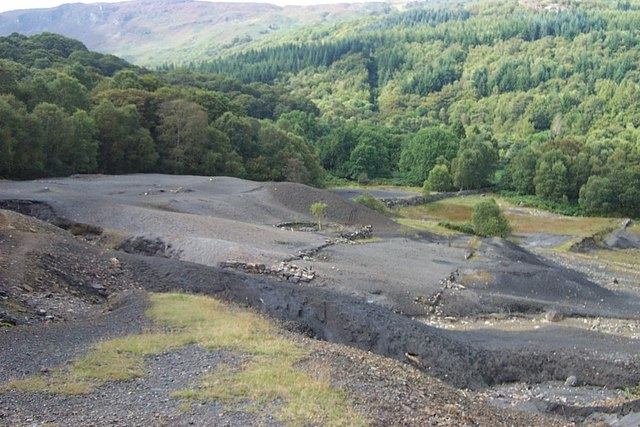
The waste heaps to the west of the mill building

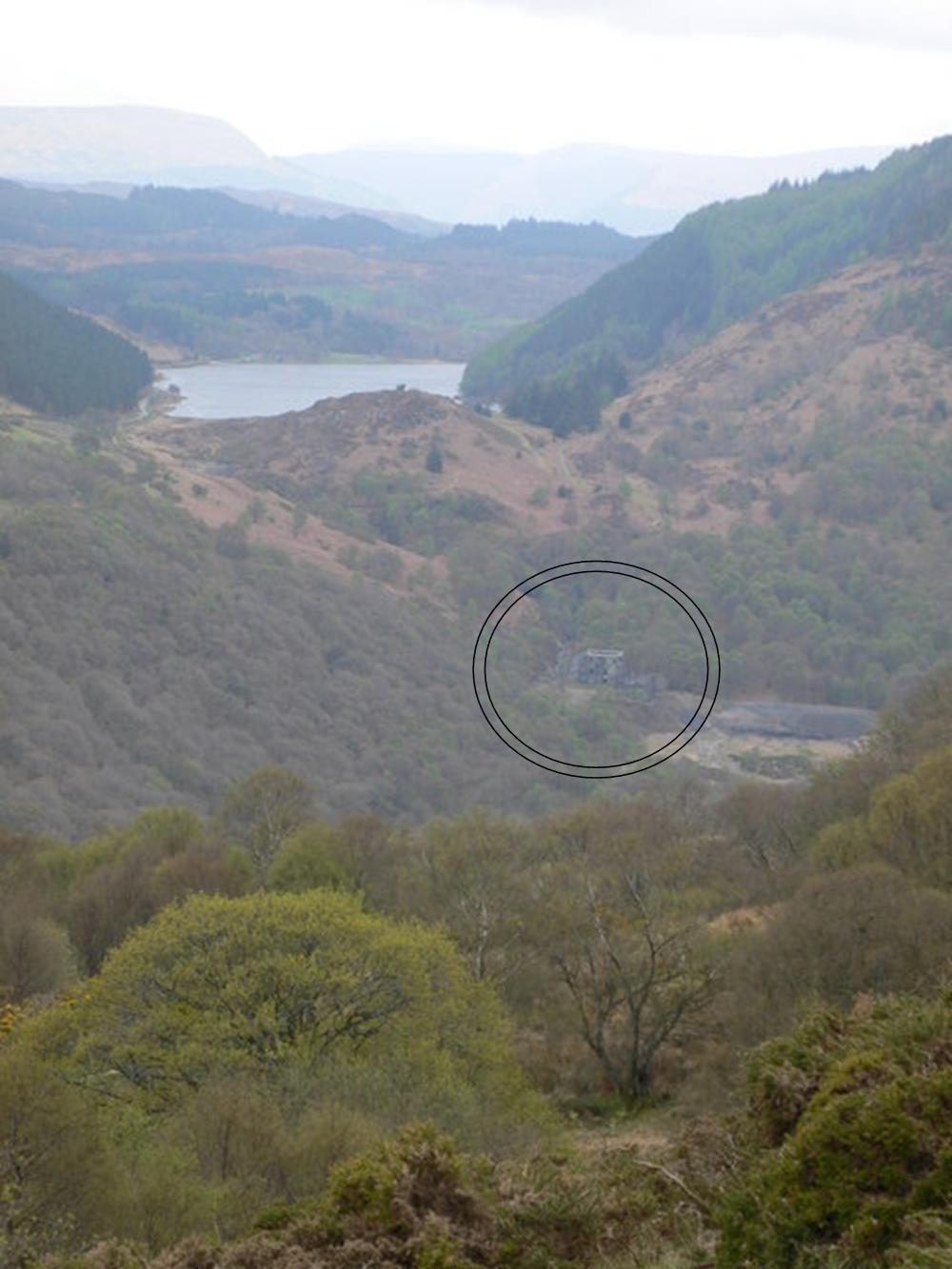
A distant view from Cefn Cyfarwydd showing Llyn Geirionydd in the distance, with Klondyke mill highlighted, with its prominent spoil heaps to the right

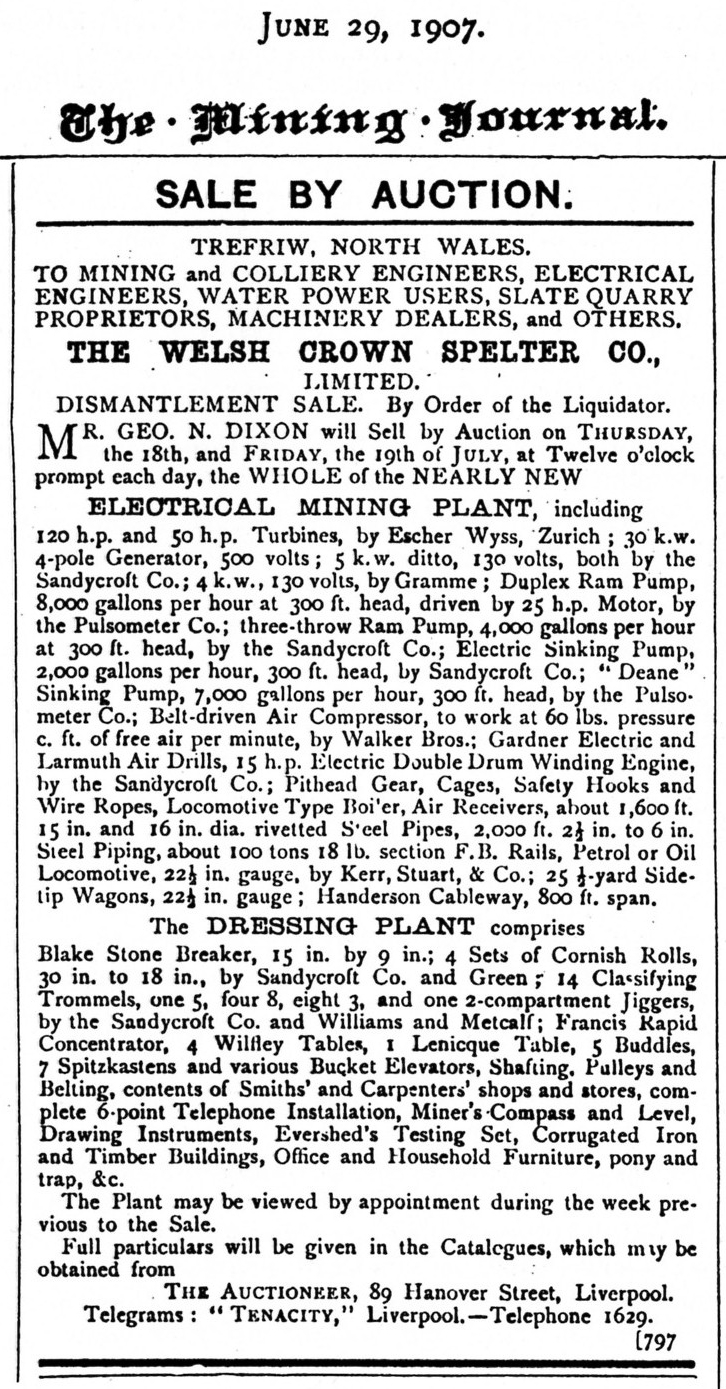
An auction advert from 1907, advertising for sale many items owned by the Welsh Crown Spelter Co. Ltd.

Klondyke mine itself, which lay immediately adjacent to the mill, albeit on the other side of the river Geirionydd (really just a large stream at this point), consisted essentially of one main adit heading south-east, directly below the line of the aerial ropeway into the mill. Although there is no evidence of a bridge today, there would clearly have been one, laid with rails, connecting the mine entrance with the lower storey of the mill - a distance of only some 40 yards. The mine had a brick-lined portal. A matter of yards beyond the portal, the adit splits into a number of very short levels, indicative of an intention to develop the mine in a number of directions. This, however, did not happen, for, inside, three tunnels head off to the right, all in a general southerly direction. The first tunnel is the longest, following the contour of the gorge at this point. Further in, the second tunnel is next in length, splitting into another very short tunnel right at its end. The third tunnel is the shortest, but all of these tunnels are ornate to a degree with mineral intrusion.

As well as this mine, Klondyke mine was worked together with numerous smaller adit workings which lay a little upstream in Geirionydd gorge, although some of these latter working were strictly part of the Bryn Cenhadon Mine.

== Decline ==
Following construction of the mill, shareholders were informed in 1900 that the future was bright, and in 1901, as indicated above, that much was indeed actually happening on the ground. Moreover, Grant Francis was claiming that ore reserves now totalled some 40,000 tons, a figure more than twice that given at the time of purchase, which was just 18,520 tons. These optimistic words were no doubt necessary to keep the shareholders happy, for in 1901, two years after the completion of the mill, there were still no profits being recorded. Francis blamed this on teething problems at the mill. He wrote:

It may be noticed that so far I have not referred to the dressing works. After great trials and nearly a years delay, creating considerable extra costs, the mill is running today, but, as occurs to all such complicated machinery, it has required a great amount of care in its preliminary trials to be sure that every part thereof runs in unison. This has now been accomplished, and it may be considered that from this time on it will do its work well and very economically. Although I have made calculations as to the production of the dressing works, and the cost of production of the dressing works, and the cost of producing a ton of ore. I do not feel justified yet in making these predictions public, but I may say that even with the present low prices for the metals of spelter and lead, we shall be able to make a fair profit on the apparently large outlay which has been made, a great portion of`which is, however, as it were, like security in the bank, which your dressing works must turn into coin. In conclusion, I may say that in the way your mines and dressing floors are now equipped as a going concern, there are, in my humble opinion, no mines and works of their class more up-to-date in natural facilities, equipment, and staff in the United Kingdom, and I am proud to be the chief engineer of them.

Despite Francis' optimism, shareholders were unsettled; all the effort was going into developing Pandora mine and Klondyke mill, and there was no money being made yet.

In July 1902 shareholders were told that still no ore had been processed at Klondyke, but Francis was nevertheless still promising a bright future, and indeed production started in the second half of that year. At Pandora too, the work of development now turned to driving new sections underground.

Since the formation of the company in 1899, some 100 men had been employed annually, and this now increased to some 150. But the company had huge debts, ore prices had dropped, and it was clear that the huge underground reserves predicted were not yielding the profits anticipated. Whilst Pandora mine had been greatly developed, this was done more on the surface than underground, and the levels reached by the former owners had not even been reached, let alone exceeded. In 1903 shareholders were told by Chairman Edmund Pontifex that:

the great delay which was unavoidably incurred in getting the dressing works [i.e. Klondyke mill] perfected prevented the practical testing of the stopes left by the previous owners. It was never anticipated that great results would be obtained from these stopes, and it has, somewhat late in the day, been found necessary to discard them and push developments on into virgin ground.

Loans to the company had been far in excess of those anticipated, but the reported note of optimism to shareholders was that elsewhere the parent Company was doing well. Shareholders, on questioning these figures, learned that the mines had been bought by the company for just £4950, but that some £27,791 had since been spent on them.

The situation locally, however, did not improve; the Pandora mine never did become profitable, having spent some £70,000 and achieved very little. The Welsh Crown Spelter Company went into voluntary liquidation, and it ceased operation in January 1905.

(In a legal Court Case which was to be a precedent for others, that of English Crown Spelter Co. Ltd v. Baker, after the English Company had been required to write off some £38,000 of the Welsh company's debts, the question arose as to whether the advance could be said to be an investment of capital, in which case the English Company would have no right to deduct the amount. But if it was money employed for the business, it could be deducted. The judge who considered these questions, observed:

It is impossible to look upon this as an ordinary business transaction of an advance against goods to be delivered. I can come to no other conclusion but that this was an investment of capital in the Welsh Company and was not an ordinary trade transaction of an advance against goods.

Klondyke mill, in fact, continued operating on a smaller scale until its closure in 1911. The first buy-out of Pandora and Klondyke was by the North Western Spelter Syndicate in 1906, who produced over 10 tons of lead ore and 50 tons of blende before an option on seeking additional funds run out after a year.

The Welsh Crown Spelter company still retained a few men on its books, to safeguard its assets, and a catalogue of these assets was prepared. In June 1907 an auction advertisement (see bottom picture) subsequently appeared in the Mining Journal, selling many of the mechanical assets of the Welsh Crown Spelter Co., and divided into 'Electrical Mining Plant', mostly from Pandora mine and 'Dressing Plant', from Klondyke mill. Pertinent to the Klondyke operation, this sale included the like of 100 tons of 18 lb flat-bottom rail, a petrol locomotive of 22.5" gauge, 25 side-tip wagons, and 800' of Henderson cableway. The dressing plant on offer included a stone breaker and several jiggers, pulleys and belts, the contents of smiths' and carpenters' shops, telephone installations, drawing instruments, office and household furniture, and a pony and trap. It is clear from the full list of auction items that the mill was very dependent on electricity for its operation. This may also have contributed to the decline, for pumping equipment in particular was prone to failure.

The contents of the auction were bought lock, stock and barrel by a Liverpool colliery owner, who went on to form the New Pandora Mining Syndicate Ltd., registered in 1908. Some 50 men were employed, but in 1912 the company folded. In that year Hafna Mines Ltd. (of 1907) bought Pandora mine, but not Klondyke mill, as they had other dressing floors available to them on their Hafna site.

In 1919, Edward McCarthy, Mining Engineer and Consultant, wrote of the following causes regarding the failure of the Welsh Crown Spelter Company:

- Underground development bore little proportion to expenditure on surface works.
- Too much attention was paid to an unproductive section of the New lode to the north of its intersection with the Goddard lode.
- Unreasonable conditions were demanded for the right-of-way over the considerable distance to the mill.
- The benefit of the adit level was not available until after the company had left the sett.
- The low price of lead and zinc made profitable working impossible.

== Aspinall's Klondyke scam ==
The mill is today known as Klondyke Mill, after the Klondike Gold Rush, and this name derives from a scam operated in the 1920s.

In 1918 Joseph Aspinall, a man with mining credentials, but formerly an undischarged bankrupt (1912) who had served time in jail for failing to disclose this in 1917, formed the Crafnant and Devon Mining Syndicate Ltd, having purchased the lease from the Trefriw Mining Company. (This payment, incidentally, was not ever made!) In 1920 the Mining Journal of 6 May 1920 carried an article stating that this company had acquired the Trefriw silver-lead mines, where it had struck a rich lode – containing 70oz of silver per ton – in the former prospecting level. The mill machinery was described as being modern and in full working order, with a turbine easily capable of dressing 1500 tons a week. By 1920, however, Aspinall was in prison for running a scam.

Much of the detail comes from Charles Holmes, proprietor of the nearby Parc mine, who claims he unearthed the scam. In brief, Aspinall made absurd claims as to the potential and output of the mine, and employed many local men to carry it out. His scheme involved the use of the mill building and of the adjacent mine entrance, which in fact contained only a couple of prospecting tunnels of no great length, and where no minerals had been found.

Aspinall would entertain prospective shareholders from London, paying for their first-class train fare and accommodation, and take them to see the mine and the mill. On approaching the mine, he would give a friendly hoot on his car horn, which was, in fact, a signal for his "workers" to act their roles. The entrance tunnel to the mine had previously been cleaned, and some 20 tons of lead concentrates (shipped from Devon) were glued to the walls, giving a sparkling appearance. Aspinall had also purchased locally galena concentrates for which he would pay 50% above the ordinary market price. This was he said, for use in a new secret process, but was in fact used to provide some evidence of mined ore. Men guarded the entrance to the tunnel, and others ran around, giving an impression of great activity. In Klondyke mill itself, much of the equipment (a stone breaker and a few jigs) was of virtually no use at all, but Aspinall installed a shaking table, then erected a launder from the stonebreaker to the head of the table. Together with a couple of other pieces of equipment, it all looked the part and made a convincing noise.

Holmes, whose suspicions were aroused by a number of factors, notified Scotland Yard, and Aspinall was eventually sentenced to 22 months in prison for having deceptively obtained some £166,000 from his victims. He subsequently moved to France, where he attempted a similar scam, but was sentenced to 5 years in jail. In 1927 he received another 4 years in jail for an oilfield scam.

== The site today ==
Today Klondyke mill is in a fairly dangerous state of disrepair. The roof has long collapsed, and in recent years there has been a small area of collapse on the east wall of the turbine house, though the remainder of the wall appears relatively stable. As a consequence of the well-buttressed walls, the remainder of the building also appears relatively stable, despite its height. To the north-west of the mill building, on the dressing floor below the mill, lie the remains of buddle pits (stone-lined pits to clean and concentrate the lead ore prior to smelting), with the remains of buddle ponds - the dammed reservoirs referred to by Francis, above) a little further away, towards Crafnant road, from where the site can be legally accessed along a right of way. The site can also be accessed from a path from Trefriw which follows the old access road on the eastern side of the river Geirionydd.

The waste heaps of glassy slag on the west side of the main building are so contaminated with lead that even now, a century later, nothing grows on them.

The main adit was blocked by a grill in 2009, for safety reasons. Inside, one of the main Klondyke levels is blocked by a concrete barrier. It is thought to have been installed to use the chamber which the tunnel led to as a "slate-slurry" pit, with the waste being dumped down an air shaft.

The route of the tramway from Pandora mine can be seen running down the hill on and embankment on the southern side of the Capel Curig road and the stream. As it approaches lake Geirionydd it swings to the right, to cross the present day road, before heading for the lake shore. The route alongside Llyn Geirionydd can be discerned in places today, running along the lake's length between the road and the lake shore in a small cutting. (This road was not built until about the 1940s.) North of the lake, the tramway route is a flat path, now a right of way, and part of Trefriw trail No. 5, and on the hillside directly above the mill some minor remains of the loading platform, water tank and pipeline can be seen. From here it can be seen where the aerial runway ran steeply down to Klondyke mill.

Geirionydd gorge, with its associated mine adits, and the area upstream of Klondyke are now popular for gorge walking.

== Gallery ==
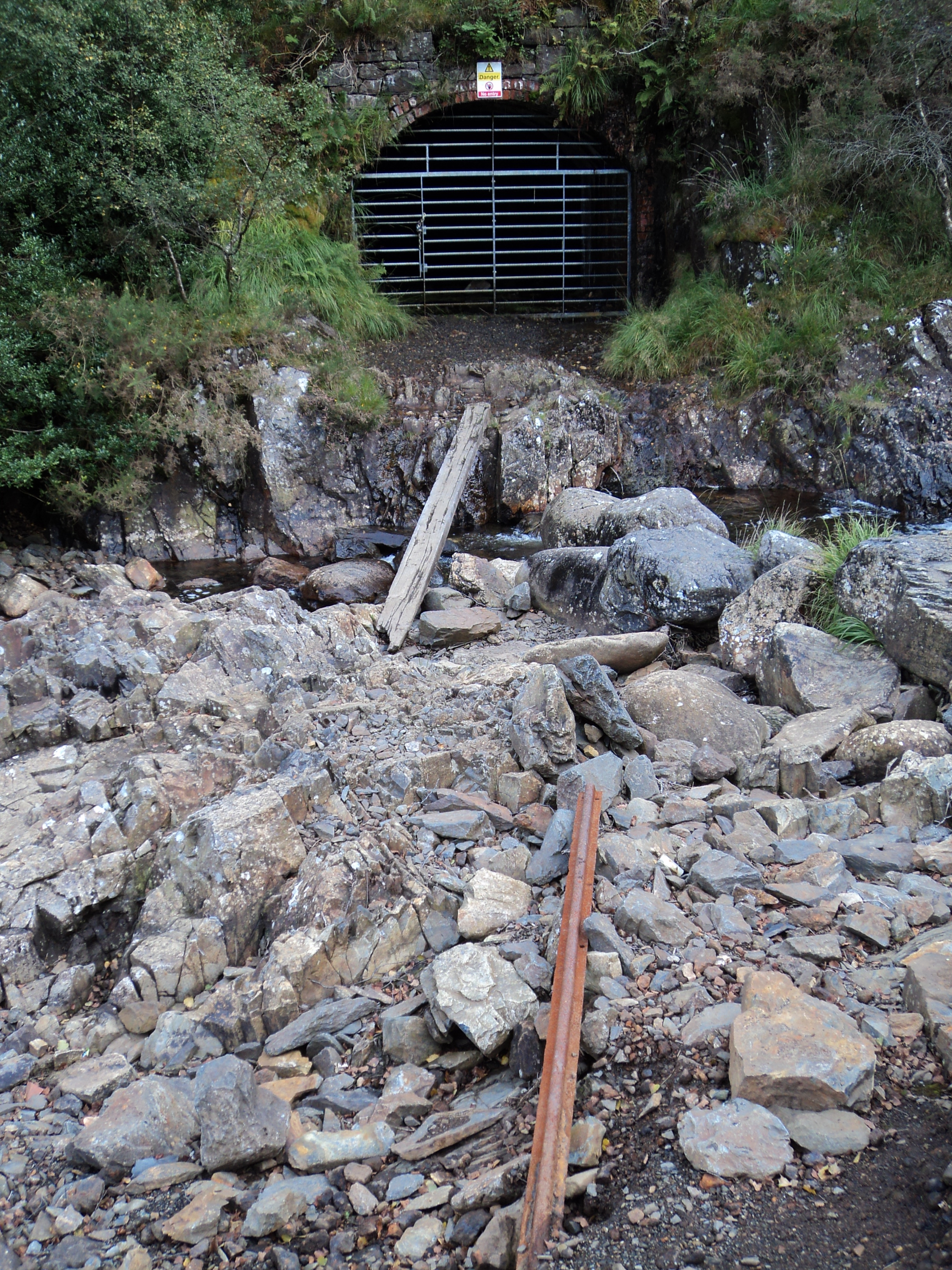
The mine viewed from the foot of the mill. A half-buried piece of rail is still extant.

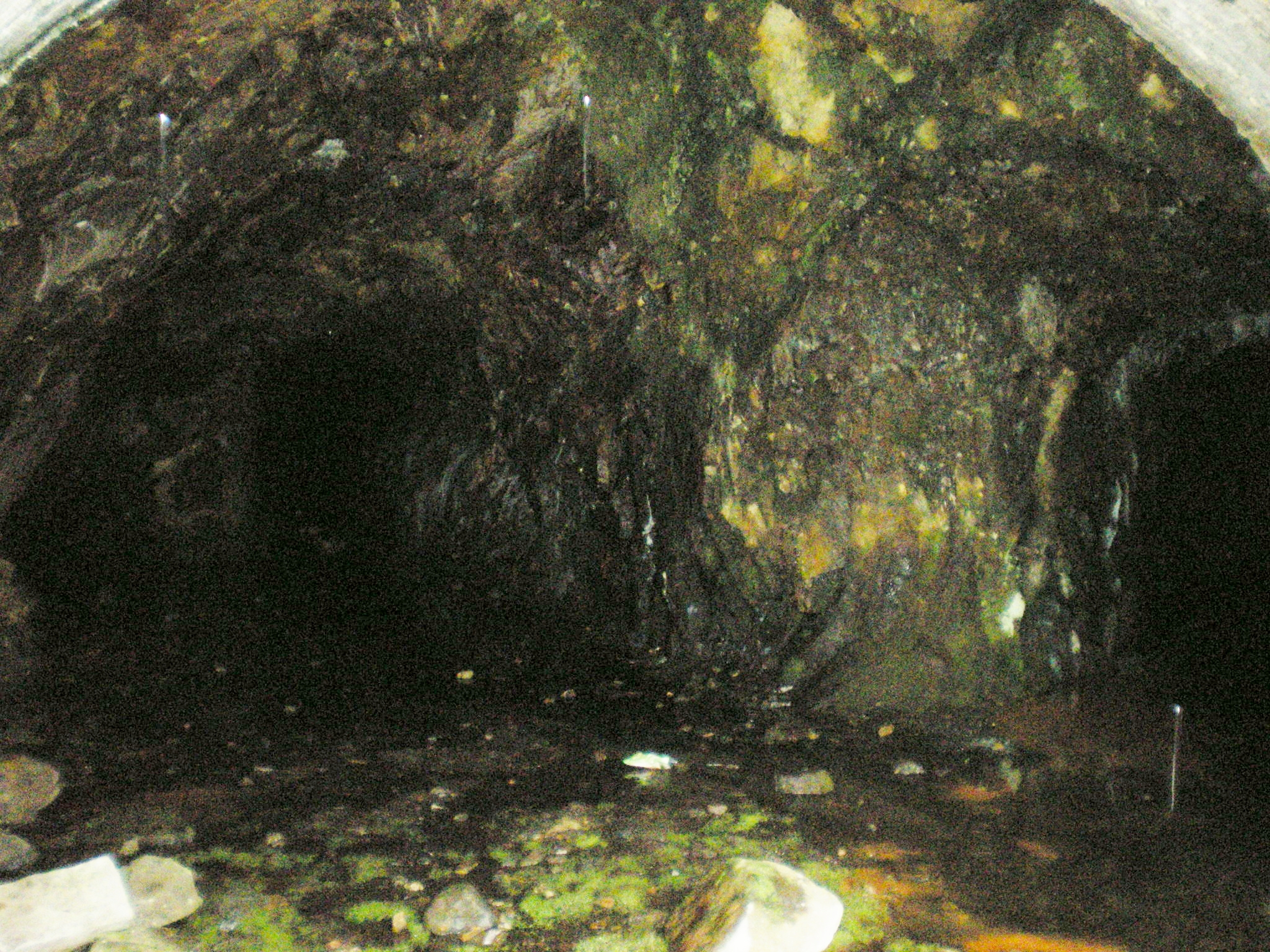
Inside the mine. The main adit heads straight on, with the longest tunnel branching off to the right

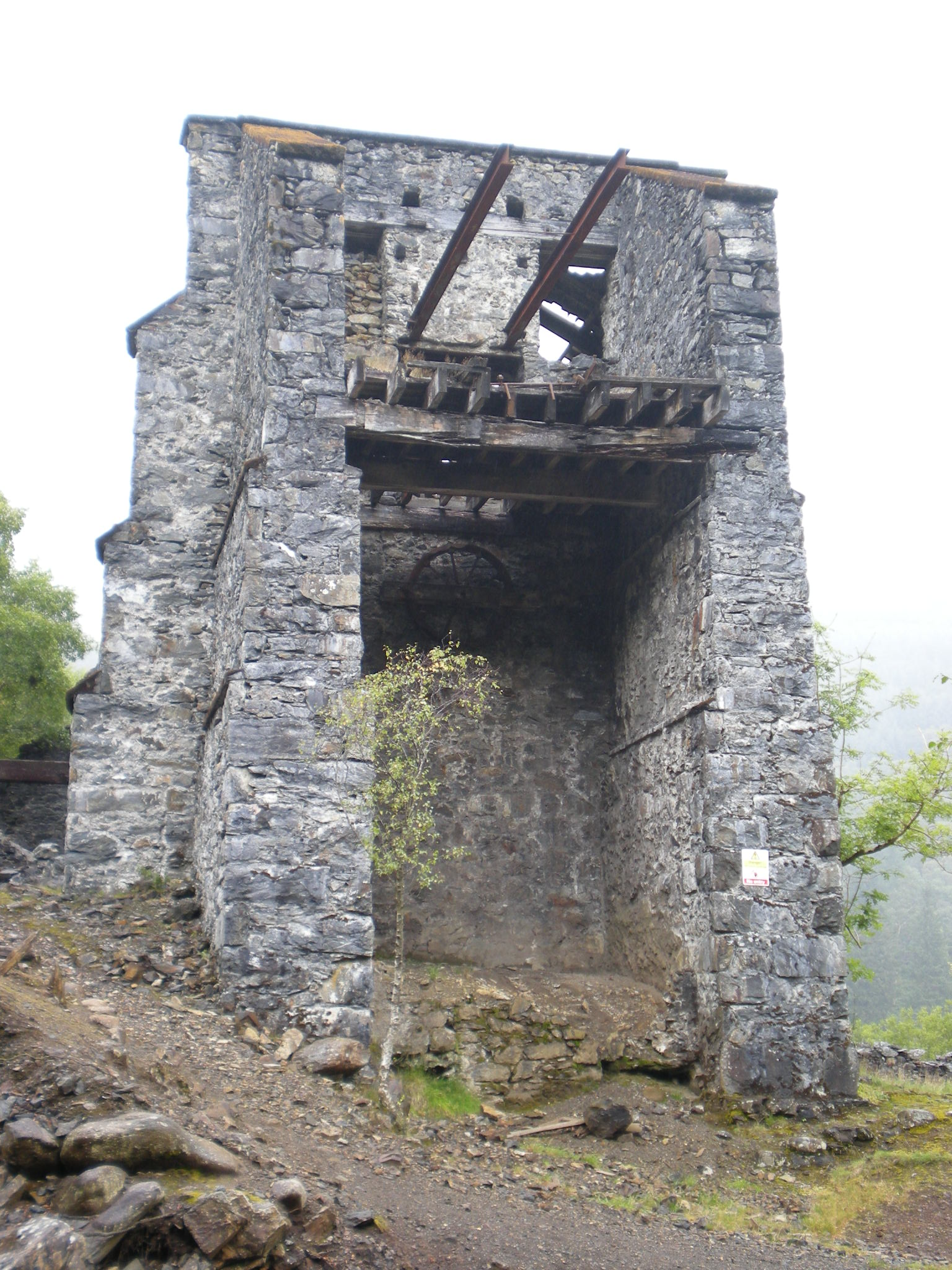
Klondyke mill viewed from the mine entrance

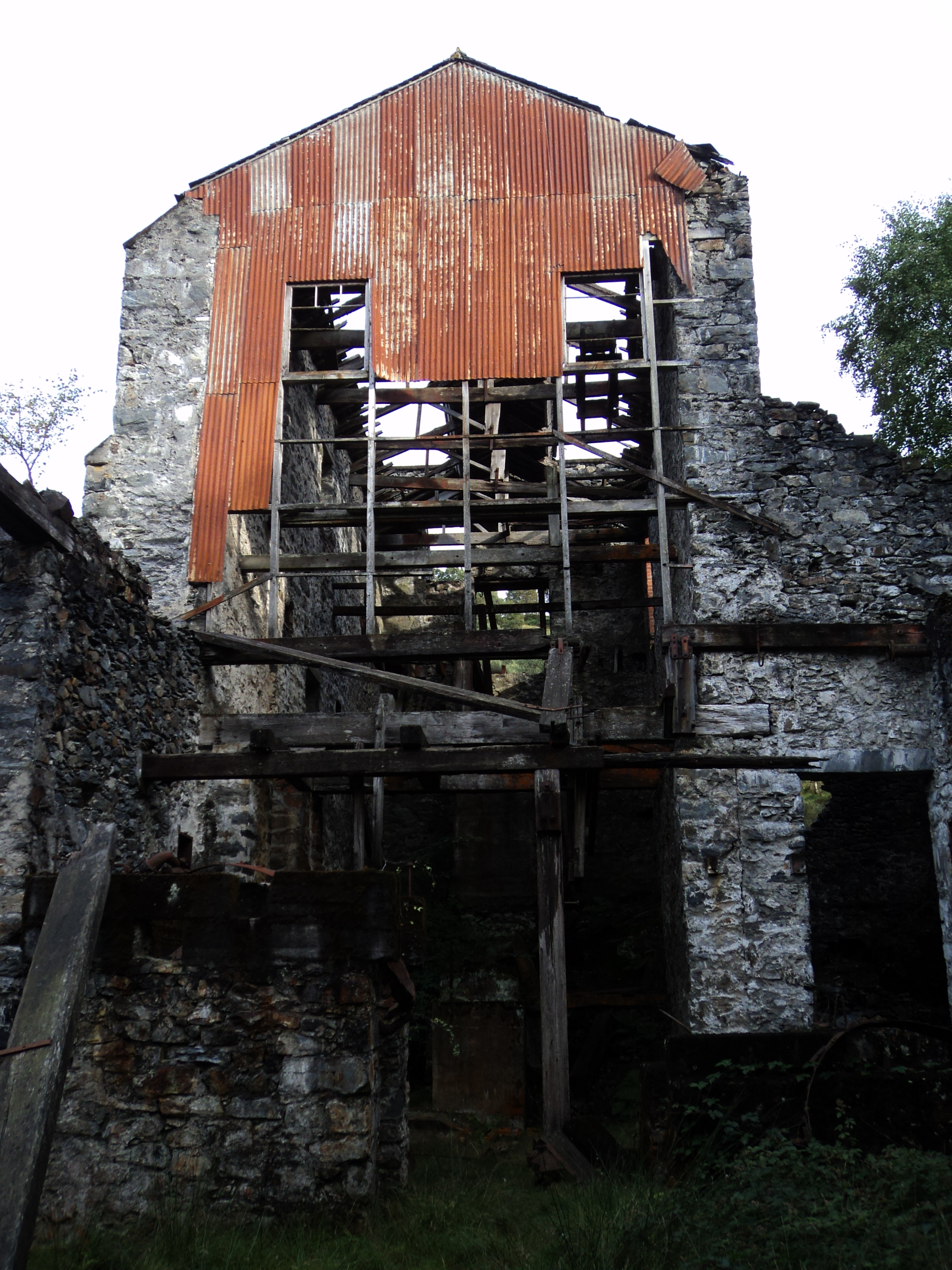
The west end of the main mill building, which was clad in corrugated iron

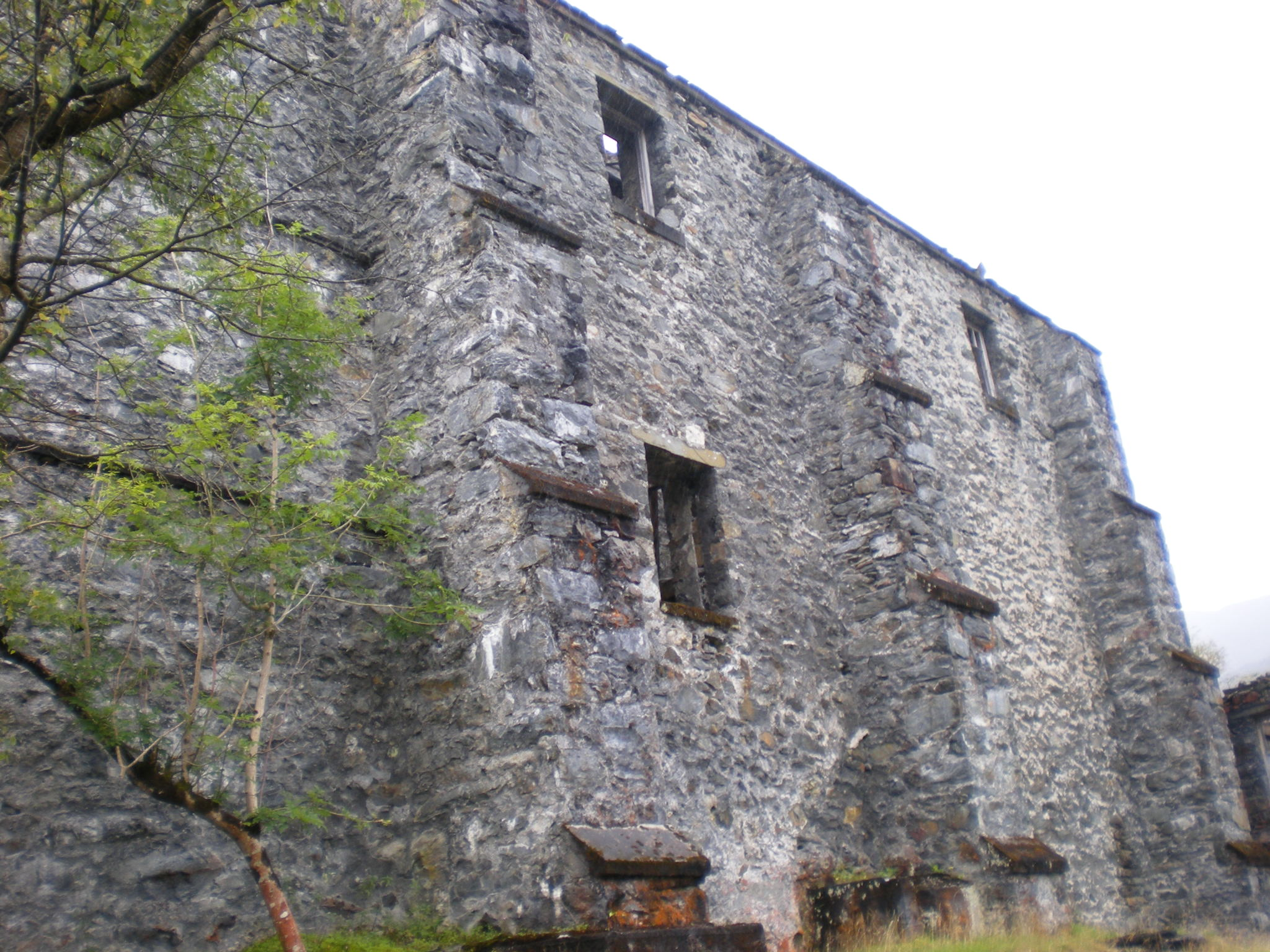
Klondyke mill's buttressed north-east wall

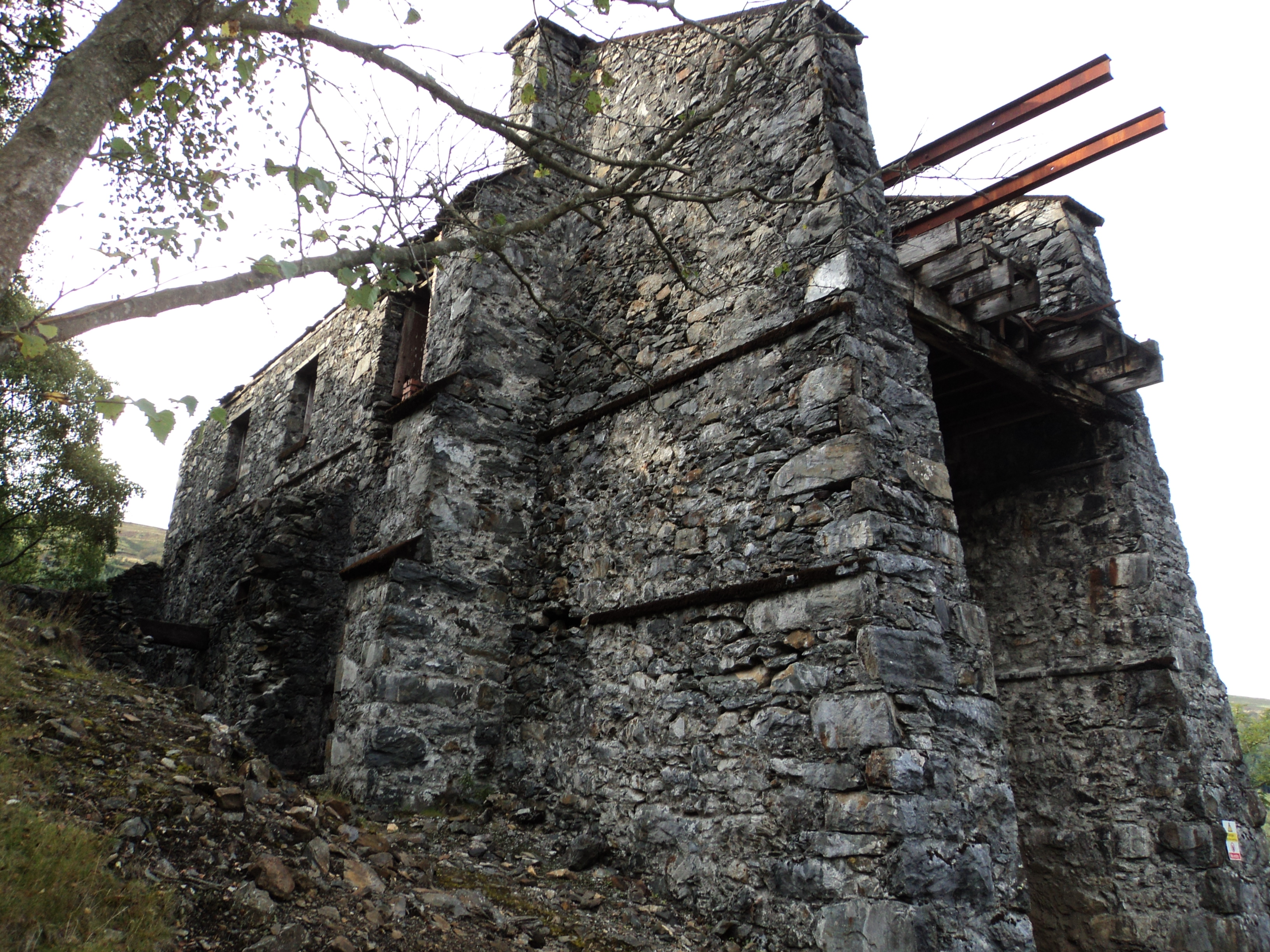
The mill's buttresses south-west wall

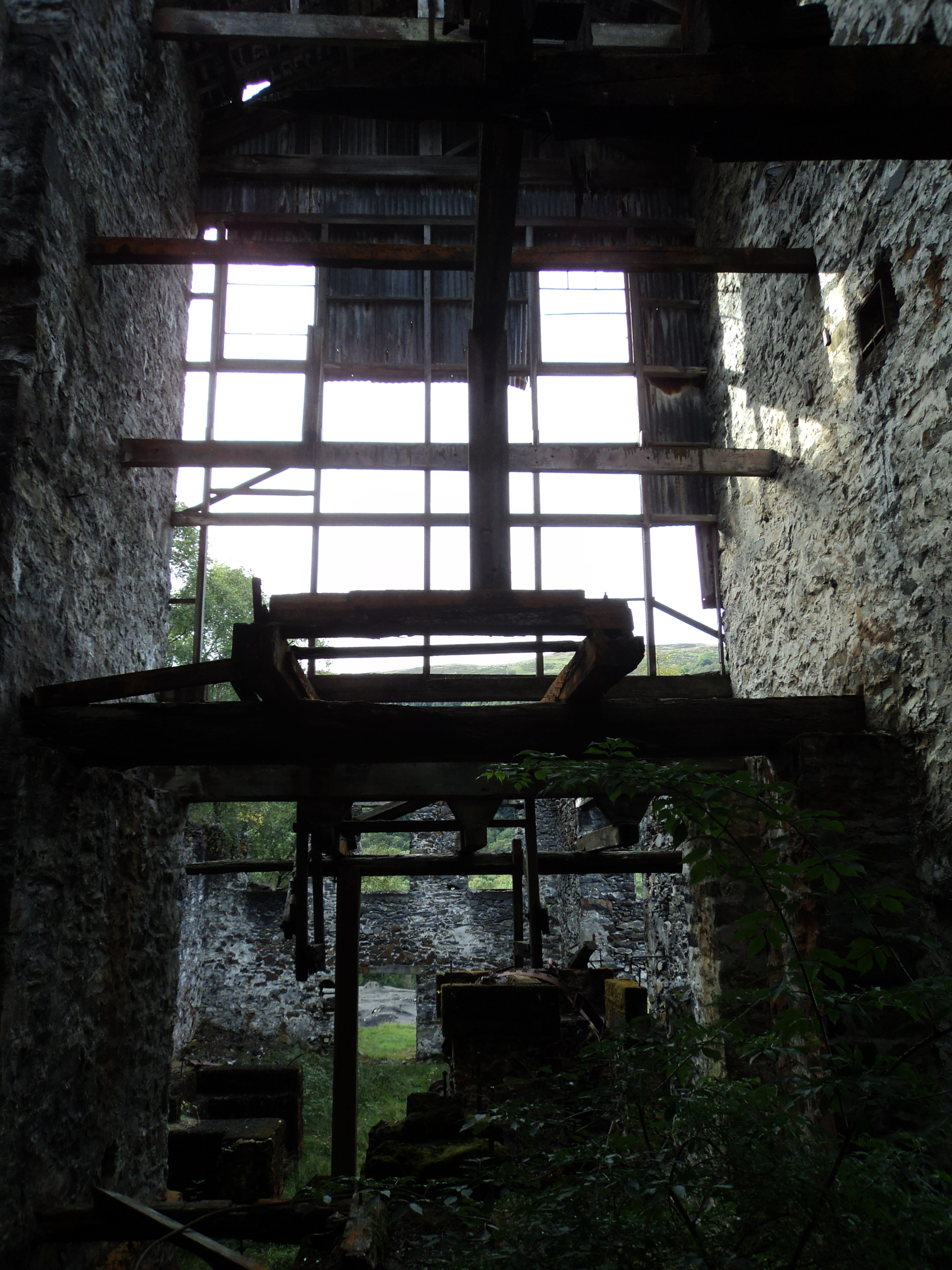
Inside the derelict Klondyke mill

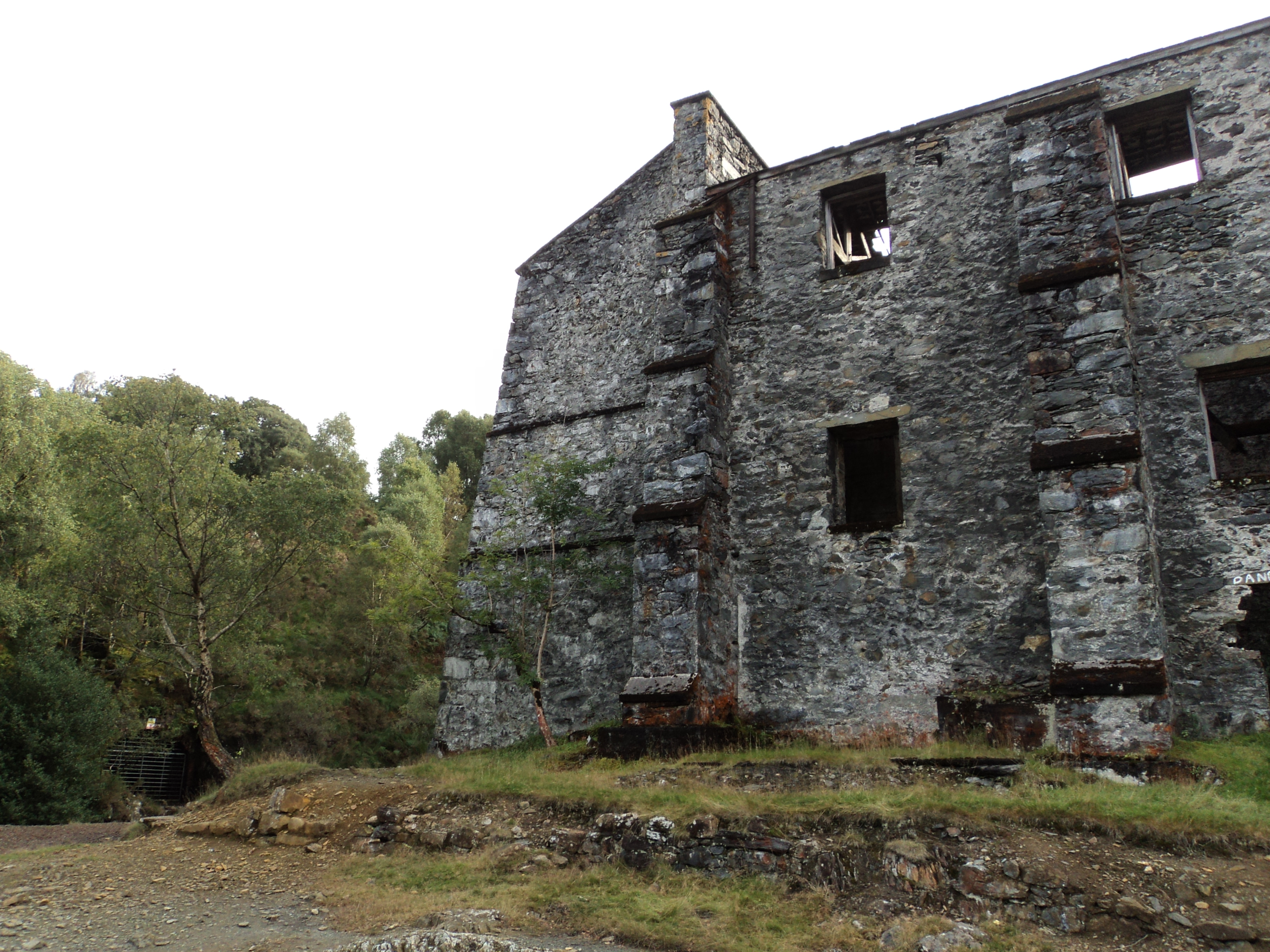
The mill from the south. The mine entrance is just visible in the bottom left corner.

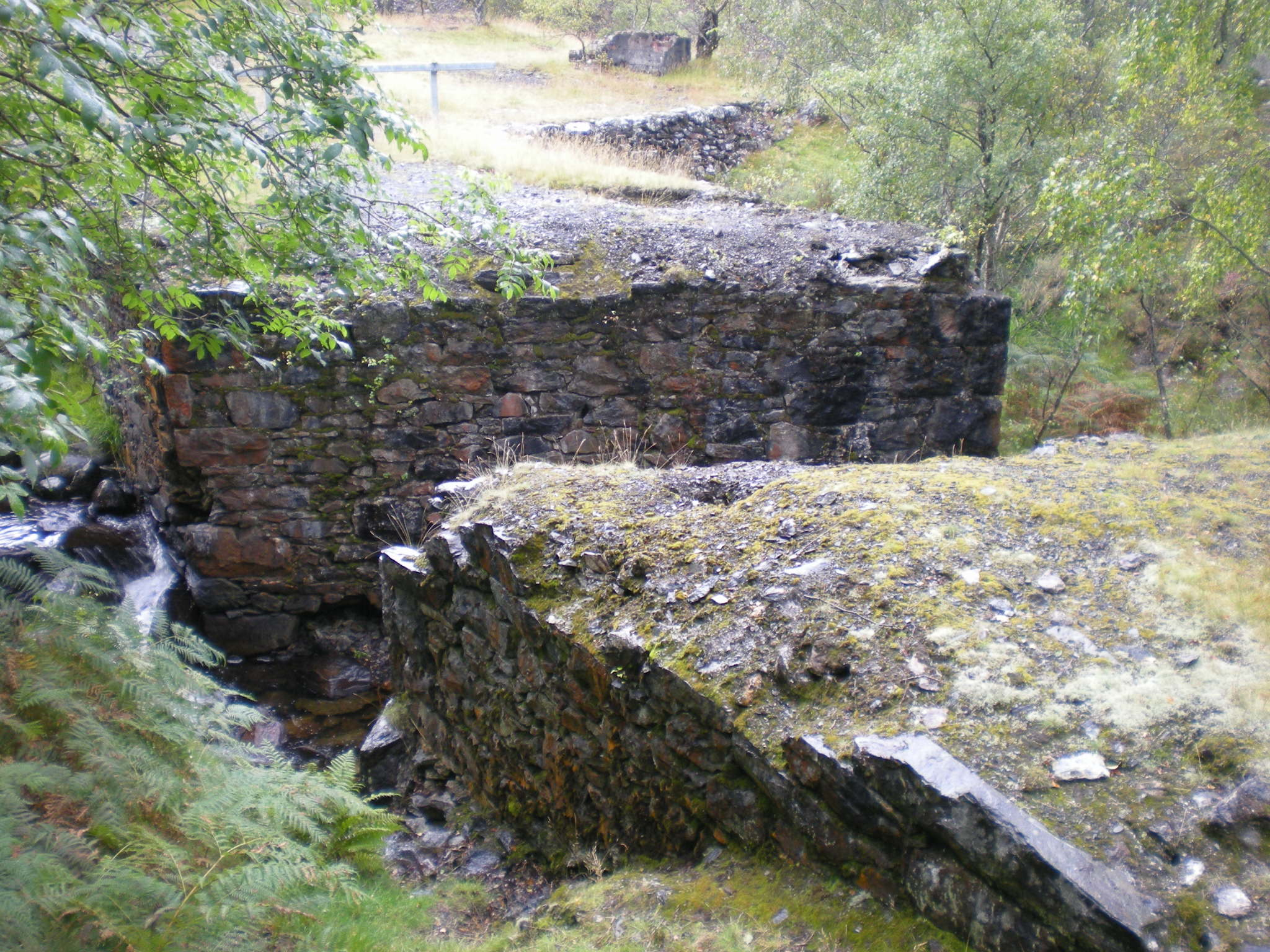
The parapets of the road access bridge, a little to the north-east of the mill

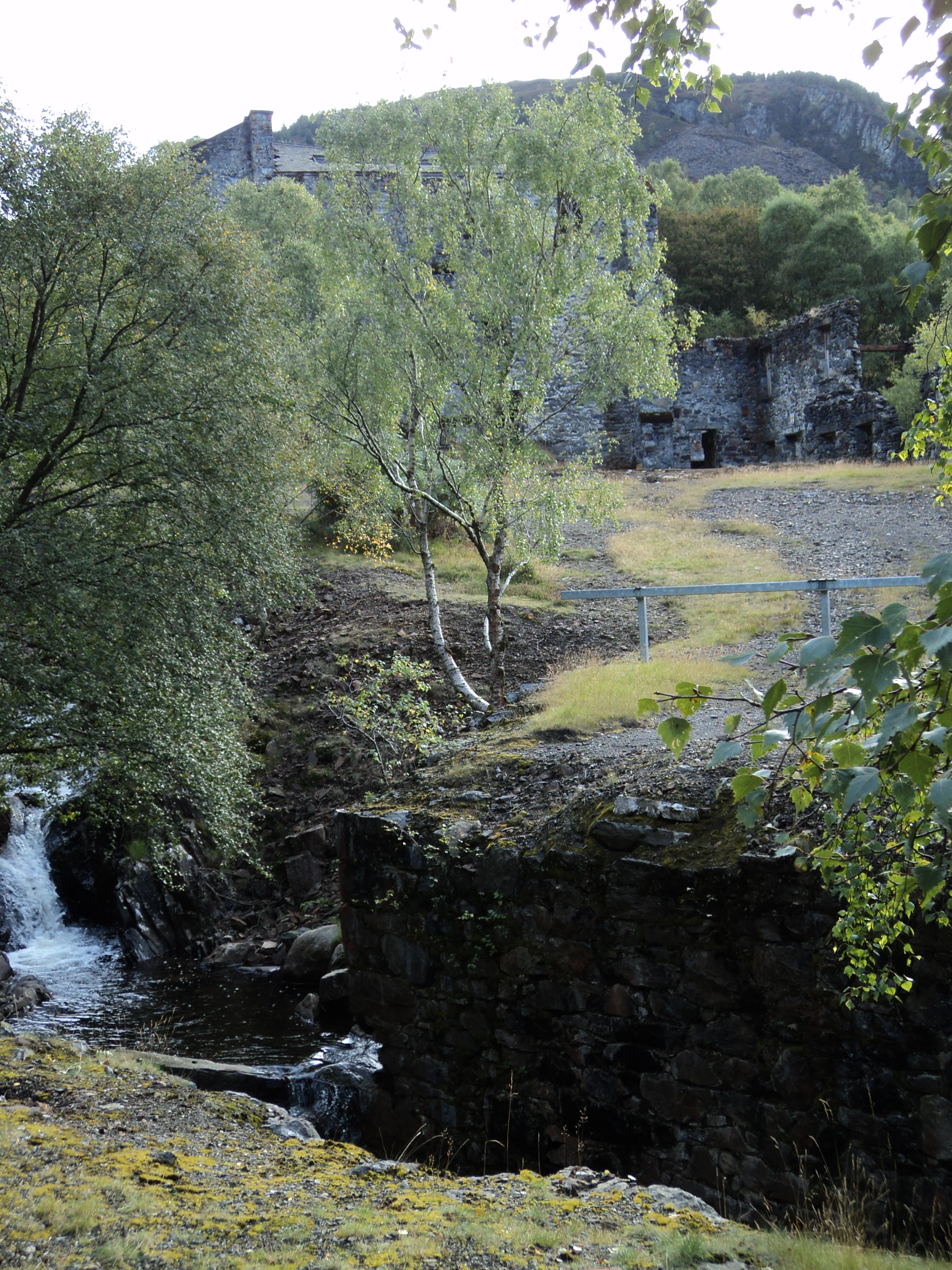
The mill, partly obscured by young birch trees, viewed from the road access bridge

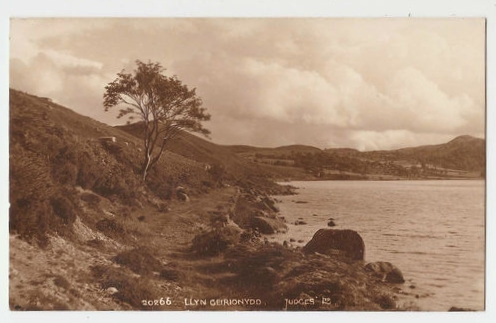
A 1920s postcard picture showing the route of the Pandora to Klondyke tramway along the shore of Llyn Geirionydd, before construction of the present road

== See also ==
- Mineral processing
- Metal mining in Wales
- Mining in Wales
