= Upper Stevens Creek Falls =

Waterfall in Washington (state), United States

- Interactive map of Upper Stevens Creek Falls
- Location: Mount Rainier National Park, Pierce County, Washington, United States
- Coordinates: 46°47′50″N 121°42′27″W
- Type: Horsetail
- Total height: 375 feet (114 m)
- Number of drops: 1
- Total width: 60 feet (18 m)
- Run: 100 feet (30 m)
- Watercourse: Stevens Creek

Upper Stevens Creek Falls is a waterfall in the Mount Rainier National Park in Pierce County, Washington. Although virtually ignored, it is said to be one of the greatest waterfalls in the state.

The falls are fed by Stevens Creek, which is a tributary of the Cowlitz River. The falls drop about 375 feet (114 m) into a narrow, barren canyon in a horsetail form about 60 feet (18 m) wide. Significant off-trail travel, which is prohibited, is required to view this waterfall properly.

== See also ==
- Fairy Falls
