= Llyn Glangors =

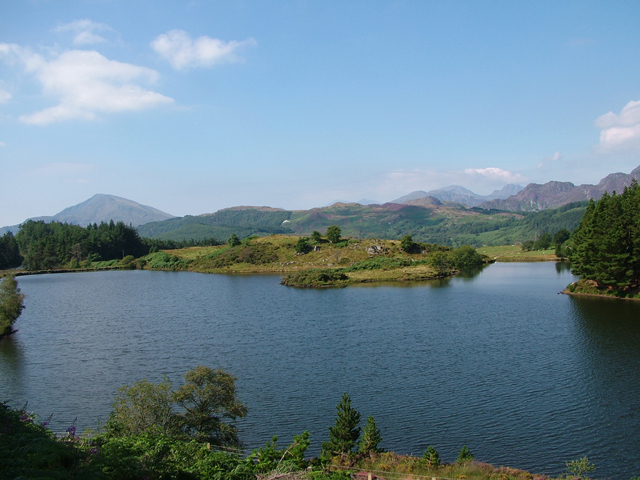
- Looking WSW across the lake. Views across to Moel Siabod (left) and Tryfan and the Glyders (right)

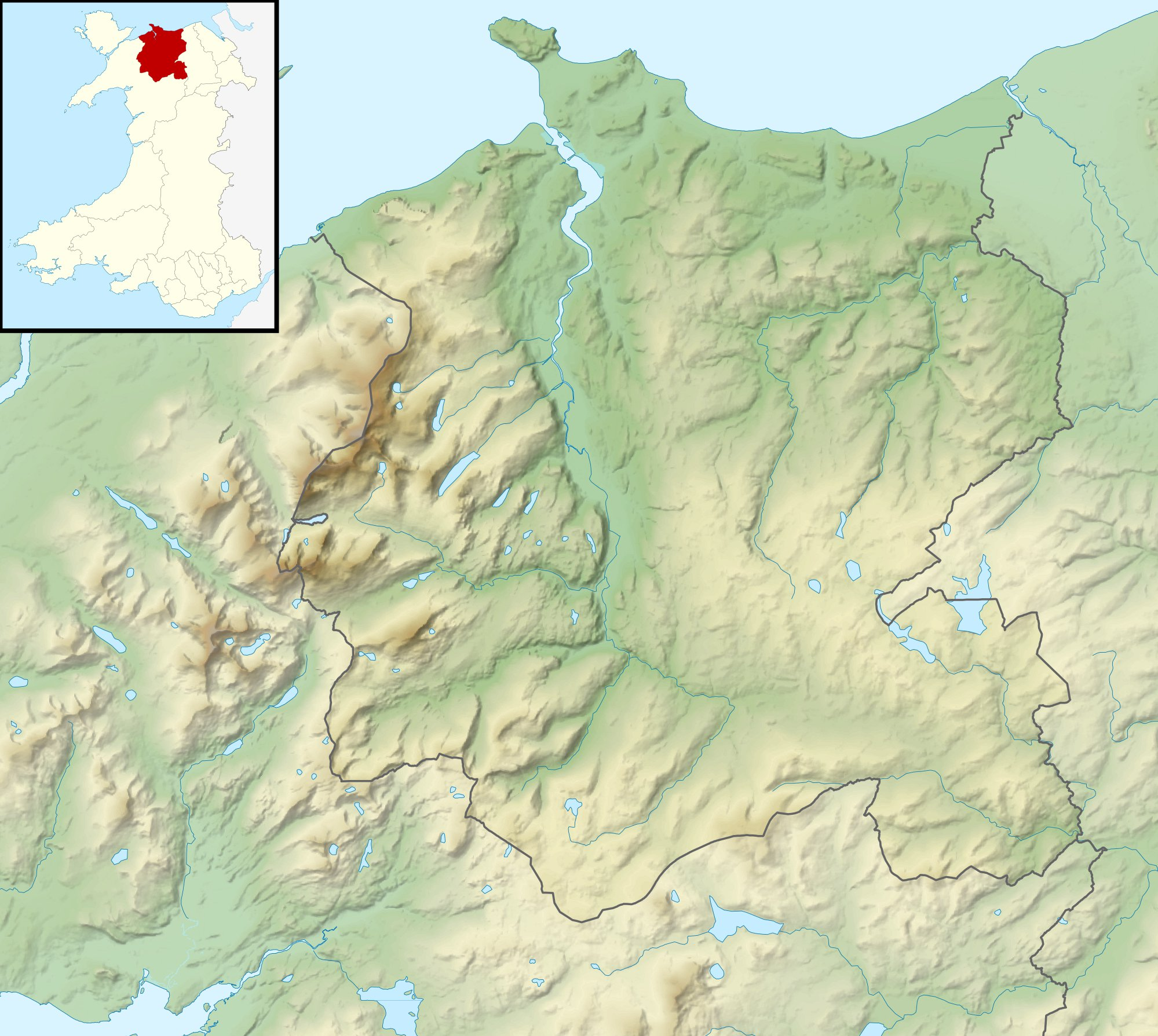
- Location within Conwy
- Location: Gwydir Forest, North Wales
- Coordinates: 53°7′36″N 3°50′8″W
- Type: reservoir
- Basin countries: United Kingdom
- Surface area: 15 acres (6.1 ha)
- Surface elevation: 900 ft (270 m)

Llyn Glangors is a lake in the Gwydir Forest in north Wales. It lies at a height of 900 ft (270 m) and covers an area of 15 acres (61,000 m^{2}). An artificial reservoir, it was created to supply water for the nearby Pandora lead mine.

Sarn Helen, the Roman road, is thought to have passed close to the lake.
