= Fairy Falls (Oregon) =

Coordinates: 45.5705°N 122.1246°W

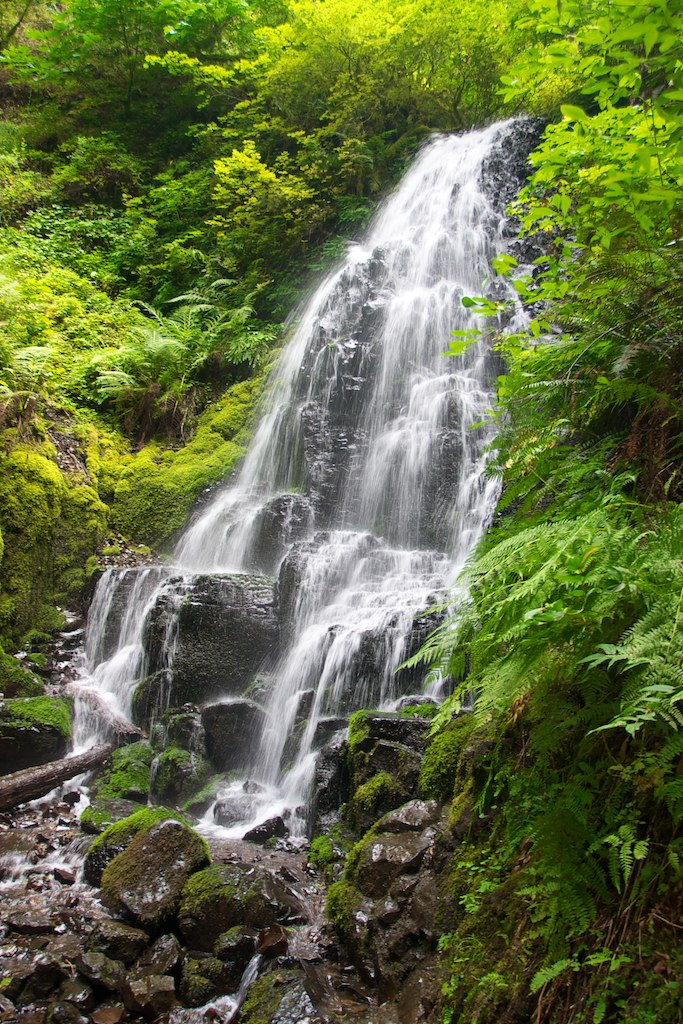
- Interactive map of Fairy Falls
- Location: Columbia River Gorge
- Type: Fan
- Elevation: 960 feet (290 m)
- Total height: 20 feet (6.1 m)
- Number of drops: 1

Fairy Falls is a 20-foot waterfall on the Oregon side of the Columbia River Gorge in the United States. As part of a tributary of Wahkeena Creek, Fairy Falls is located upstream from the much larger Wahkeena Falls. While small, this fan-shaped waterfall is a destination for photographers, mainly because of the scenic view. The creek cascades through a mossy rock slide lined with ferns, until rocky ledges of basalt break the water into various lacy streams.
