= Llyn Geirionydd =

Lake in Snowdonia, Wales

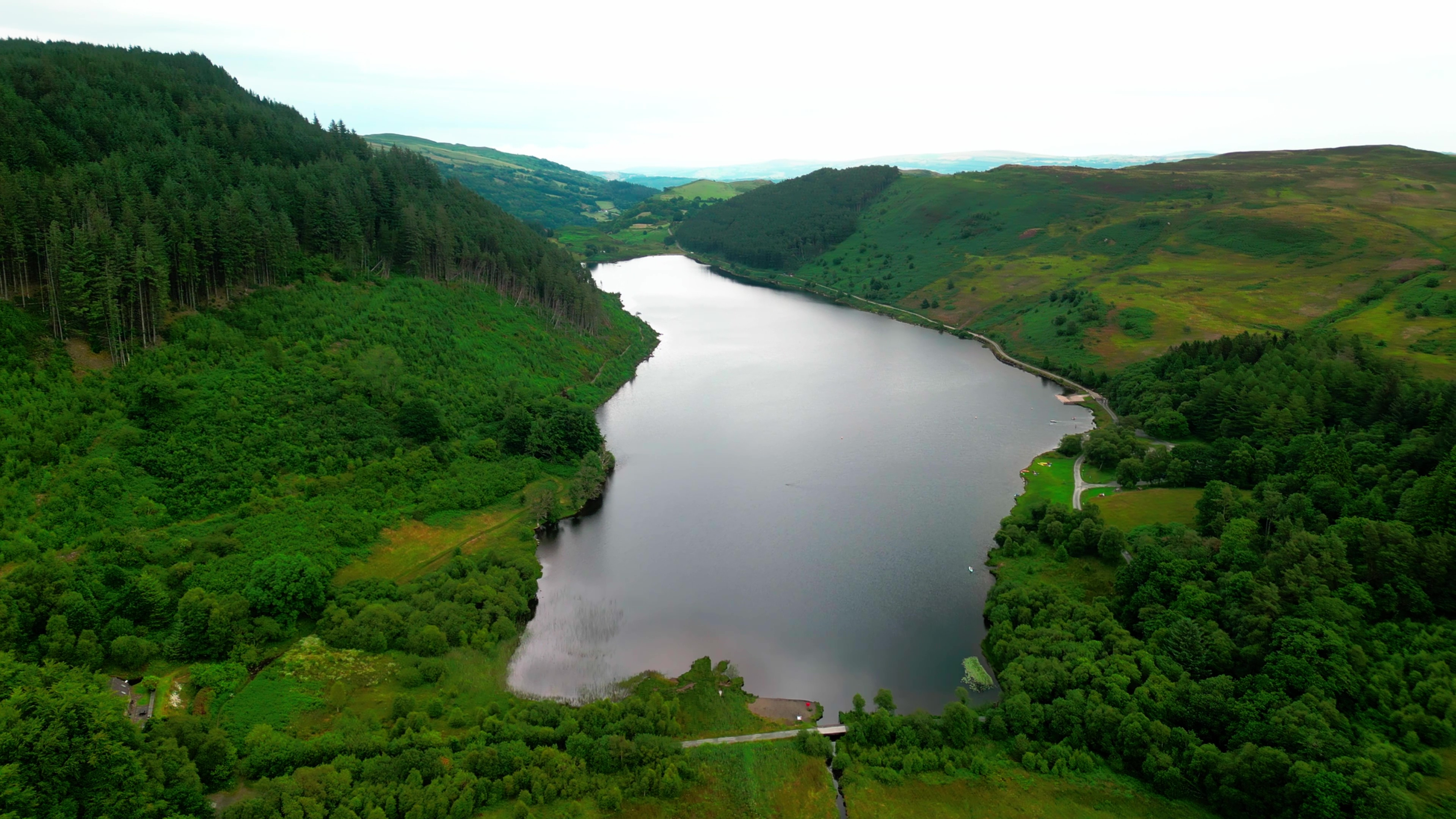

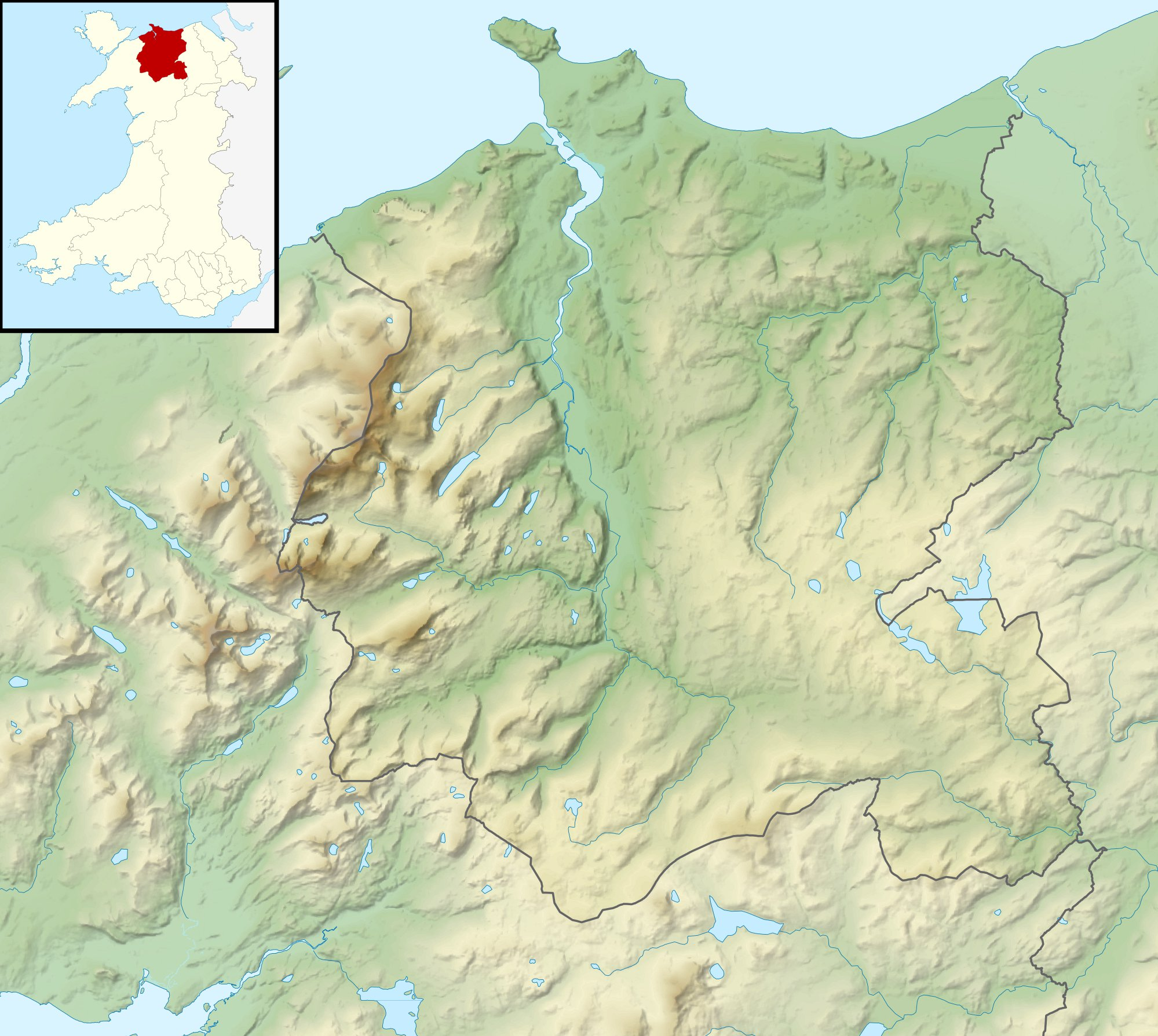
- Location within Conwy
- Location: Snowdonia, North Wales
- Coordinates: 53°7′53″N 3°50′57″W
- Type: natural
- Primary outflows: Afon Geirionydd
- Basin countries: United Kingdom
- Surface area: 45 acres (18 ha)
- Max. depth: 50 ft (15 m)

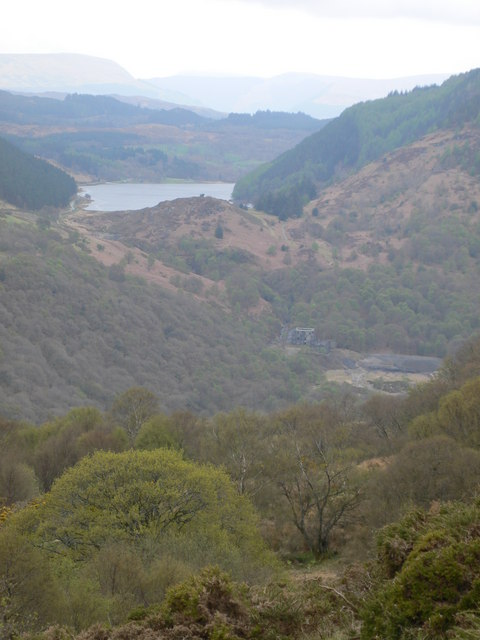
A distant view of Llyn Geirionydd from Cefn Cyfarwydd. Klondyke mill is centre picture, with its prominent spoil heaps

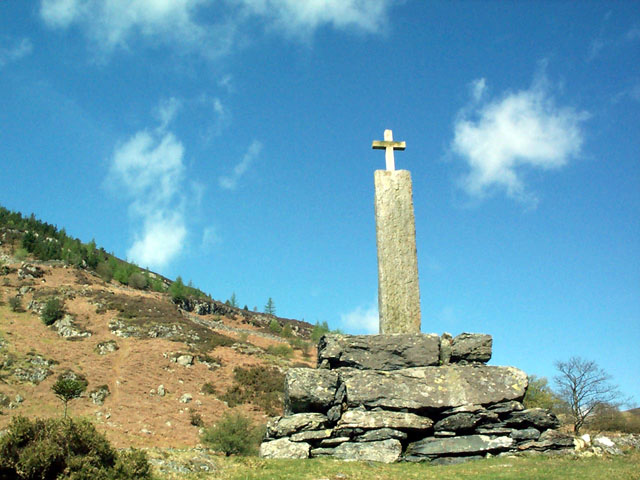
The Taliesin monument, overlooking Llyn Geirionydd

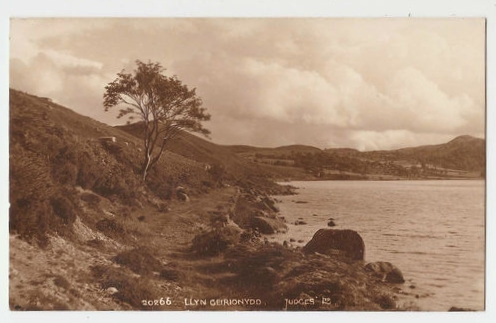
A 1920s postcard picture showing the route of the Klondyke tramway along the shore, before construction of the present road

Llyn Geirionydd lies in a valley in North Wales where the northern edge of the Gwydyr Forest meets the lower slopes of the Carneddau mountains. The lake is almost a mile long and covers an area of 45 acres (180,000 m^{2}), but is never any deeper than 50 ft (15 m) according to Jehu's survey. The lake can be reached by car from Trefriw or Llanrwst in the Conwy valley, the lane passing through the hamlet of Llanrhychwyn, or from the road through the Gwydir Forest. Access is not particularly easy by either route, but this has not stopped the lake being the only one designated in Snowdonia to permit power boats and water skiing. Many visitors also walk to the lake from the village of Trefriw (it is on one of the Trefriw Trail routes) or from the neighbouring lake of Llyn Crafnant, which runs parallel to it, but a mile distant, the two being separated by Mynydd Deulyn, “mountain of the two lakes”.

The lake has a car park (with toilets) and the location is very popular in the summer. This car park was once a waste tip site for the Pandora mine above, and indeed the planting of conifers in the area of the lake has considerably softened the effects of mining. There are few, if any, fish in the lake, and this, it is believed, is the result of the poisoning of the waters from the adjacent metal mines.

Afon Geirionydd, the outflow of Llyn Geirionydd, flows down a steep gorge—Geirionydd Gorge—which is popular for gorge walking. At the bottom of this gorge are the remains of Klondyke mill, which was powered by water from the river. This mill, apart from processing its own metals (which did not amount to much), also received lead and zinc ore from the Pandora mine, and the route of the tramway from that mine ran partly along the route of the lakeside road (which did not exist at the time), and can be clearly seen running between the road and the lake along the northern half of the lake where the road rises somewhat. This tramway continues to a point above Klondyke mill, from where wagons entered the mine via an aerial ropeway. This last part of the tramway is a right of way which runs above the valley, eventually reaching Trefriw. Below Klondyke Mill Afon Geirionydd joins Afon Crafnant, the outflow from neighbouring Llyn Crafnant, which itself is a tributary of the River Conwy.

The current road follows what some believe to be part of Sarn Helen, the Roman road which ran southwards from the fort at Canovium (Caerhun, between Trefriw and Conwy) to the fort at Tomen y Mur (near Trawsfynydd), and beyond, ultimately reaching Moridunum (Carmarthen).

The nearest settlement to Llyn Geirionydd is the hamlet of Llanrhychwyn, which has connections with Llywelyn Fawr, a Welsh prince, who had a hunting lodge in Trefriw, but who used Llanrhychwyn church, regarded by many to be the oldest church in Wales.

Llyn Geirionydd has a number of literary connections:

- Ieuan Glan Geirionydd (1795–1855) was born on the banks of Afon Geirionydd, and he was renowned for his poetry and hymns.
- Taliesin (c. 534–c.599), was a 6th-century Welsh bard, and the earliest poet of the Welsh language whose work has survived. He was an inhabitant of the area, living on the shores of Llyn Geirionydd, and this is also where many say he is buried. The Red Book of Hergest XVII contains the line "I being Taliesin, from the borders of the lake of Geirionnydd." Some sources claim that he was also born in this area, but it is more likely that he was born in Powys, as demonstrated by the contemporary poems to Cynan Garwyn, King of Powys.
- John Roberts (1828–1904) was a native of neighbouring Trefriw, and he used that name in his job as a printer and bookseller. In Eisteddfodau he would assume the bardic name of Gwilym Cowlyd. He was critical of the Anglicization of the Eisteddfodau and in 1865 he founded a separate festival to rival the big National Eisteddfod, and called it Arwest Glan Geirionydd (‘Music Festival on the Banks of the River Geirionydd’), and the meeting point was Bryn y Caniadau (hill of verse). The Taliesin Memorial by Llyn Geirionydd commemorates these Eisteddfodau, although the memorial is not actually on Bryn y Caniadau itself (which is a little further back from the lake).
- David Francis (1865–1929) made his name as “The Blind Harpist of Meirion” at these alternative Eisteddfodau.
