= Fairy Falls (Washington) =

Waterfall in Washington (state), United States

- Interactive map of Fairy Falls
- Location: Mount Rainier National Park, Pierce County, Washington, United States
- Coordinates: 46°47′40″N 121°41′58″W
- Type: Tiered Horsetails
- Total height: 680 feet (210 m)
- Number of drops: 6
- Total width: 20 feet (6.1 m)
- Run: 830 feet (250 m)
- Watercourse: Unnamed; part of Cowlitz River watershed

Fairy Falls is a waterfall in the Mount Rainier National Park in Pierce County, Washington. The falls are fed by an unnamed watercourse, which is a tributary of the Cowlitz River. The falls drop about 680 feet (210 m) into a narrow, wooden canyon in a horsetail form about 20 feet (6.1 m) wide.

Historically, the Paradise Glacier fed into two forks of Stevens Creek above the tree line, one of which produces Upper Stevens Creek Falls and the other Fairy Falls. As the glacier retreated throughout the 20th century, the drainage of Fairy Falls was gradually cut off from the glacial melt and now relies entirely on annual snowfall to sustain its flow. The falls diminish greatly in late summer and may dry-out completely during droughts.

== See also ==
- Upper Stevens Creek Falls
