= Llyn Crafnant =

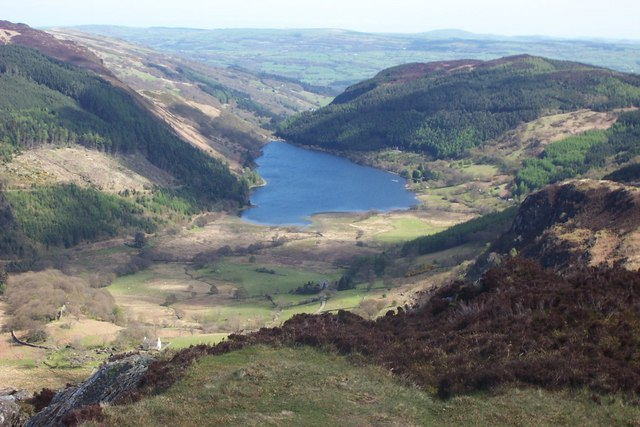
- View from the summit of Crimpiau

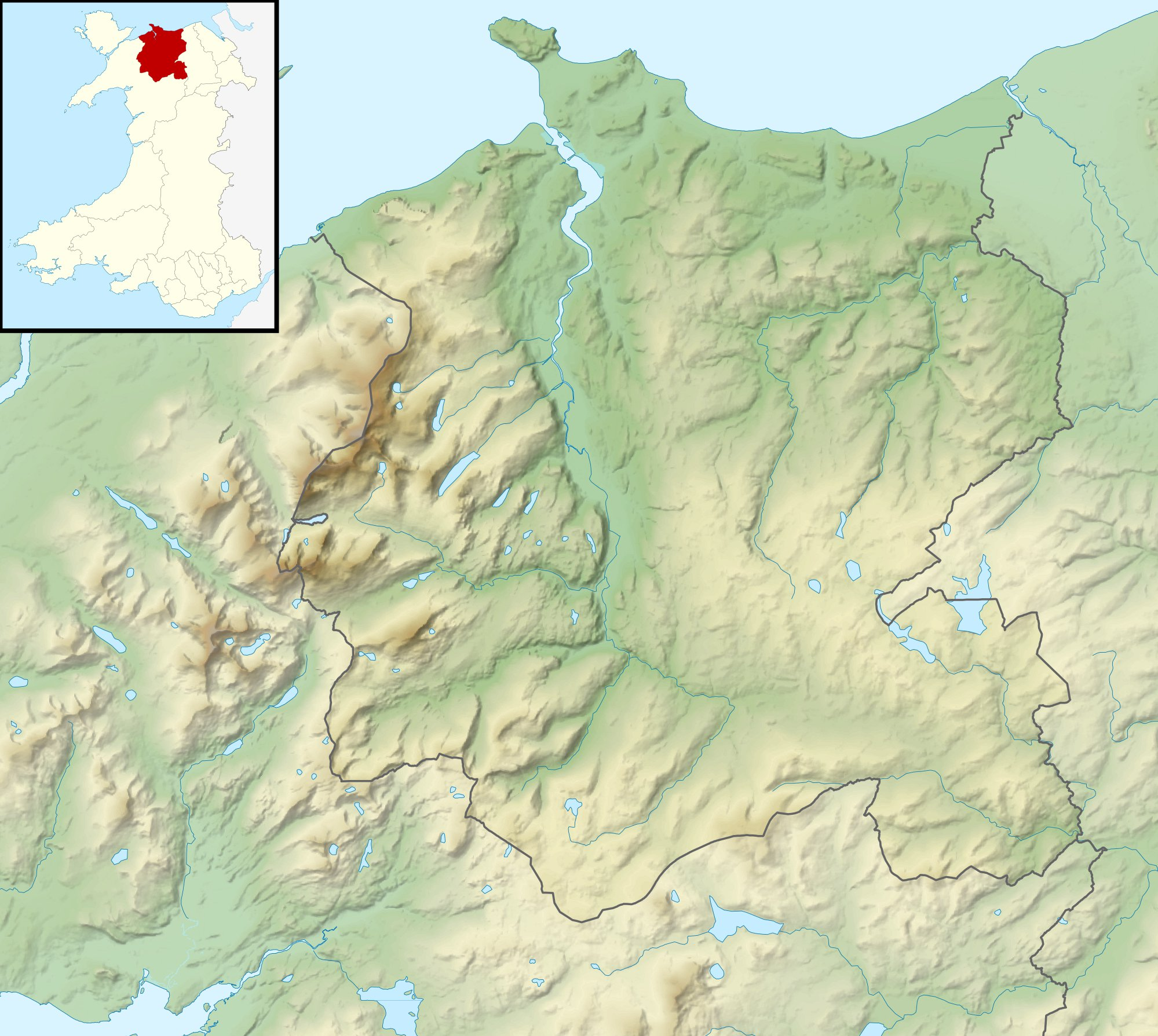
- Location within Conwy
- Location: North Wales
- Coordinates: 53°7′57″N 3°52′12″W
- Type: natural lake
- Basin countries: United Kingdom
- Surface area: 63 acres (25 ha)
- Max. depth: 71 ft (22 m)

Llyn Crafnant is a lake that lies in a valley in Wales where the northern edge of the Gwydir Forest meets the lower slopes of the Carneddau mountains and, more specifically, the ridge of Cefn Cyfarwydd. The head of the valley offers a profile of crags which are silhouetted at sunset. The Forest Park guide (2002) states that "the (view along Llyn Crafnant) is one of the most breathtaking views in all Snowdonia". The summits include Crimpiau 475 metres (1,558 feet), and Craig Wen 548 metres (1,798 feet) which provide views of Moel Siabod and the Ogwen Valley, and Snowdon. Further up is Creigiau Gleision. At 63 acres (250,000 m^{2}) it is the best part of a mile long, although it was clearly once much longer - its southern end shows the evidence of centuries of silting. Jehu's survey (see references) recorded a maximum depth of 71 ft (22 m).

Crafnant takes its name from “craf”, an old Welsh word for garlic, and “nant”, a stream or valley.

The lake can be reached by car only from Trefriw in the Conwy valley, though many visitors walk there from the village or from the neighbouring lake of Llyn Geirionydd, which runs parallel to it, but a mile distant, the two being separated by Mynydd Deulyn – “mountain of the two lakes”. The lake can also be reached on foot from Capel Curig.

There is a Natural Resources Wales car park with toilets, which is reached just before the lake itself, and the lakeside cafe (open from Easter until late summer) offers car parking for patrons. The lake is a popular fishing spot, and is kept stocked with brown trout and rainbow trout. From the cafe, it is possible to hire boats for fishing or pleasure. Private boating and swimming are not permitted.

The lake is a reservoir and was dammed at its northern end in 1874, but the dam itself is barely visible as the outflow plunges steeply from it. By the outflow is an obelisk, erected in 1896 by the inhabitants of Llanrwst which commemorates "the gift to that town of this lake with 19 acres (77,000 m^{2}) of land" by Richard James. The lake is leased to the owners of what is now the cafe.

In the upper part of the valley there is no mains water connection and during the particularly dry summer of 2006 many properties were without water.

The River Crafnant ("Afon Crafnant" in Welsh) joins the River Conwy at Trefriw, but not before some of it has been diverted to pass through the Trefriw Woollen Mills to generate hydro-electricity for the machinery.

Cornel, a large property on 25 acres (10 ha) on the southern banks of the lake, is owned and operated by the Welsh Scout Council.

Areas around the lake have been used for location shots in Hollyoaks, Tomb Raider II, the 1981 fantasy movie Dragonslayer, and the lake also appeared briefly in the 1966 film Morgan: A Suitable Case for Treatment.

== Gallery ==
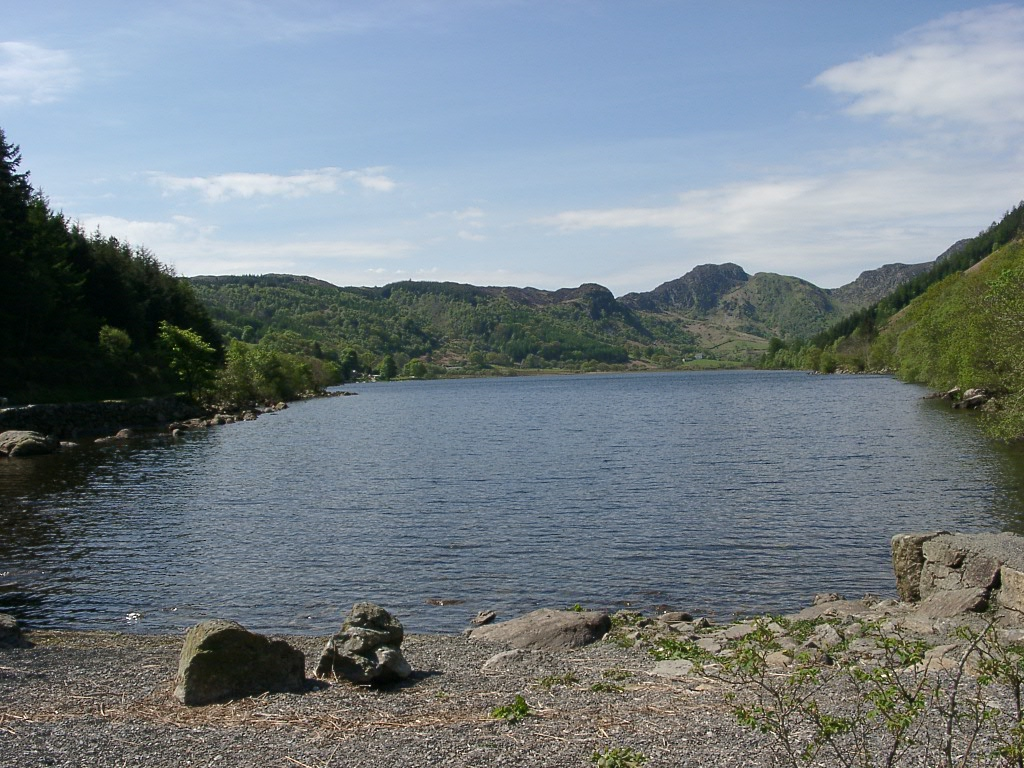
A view of Llyn Crafnant

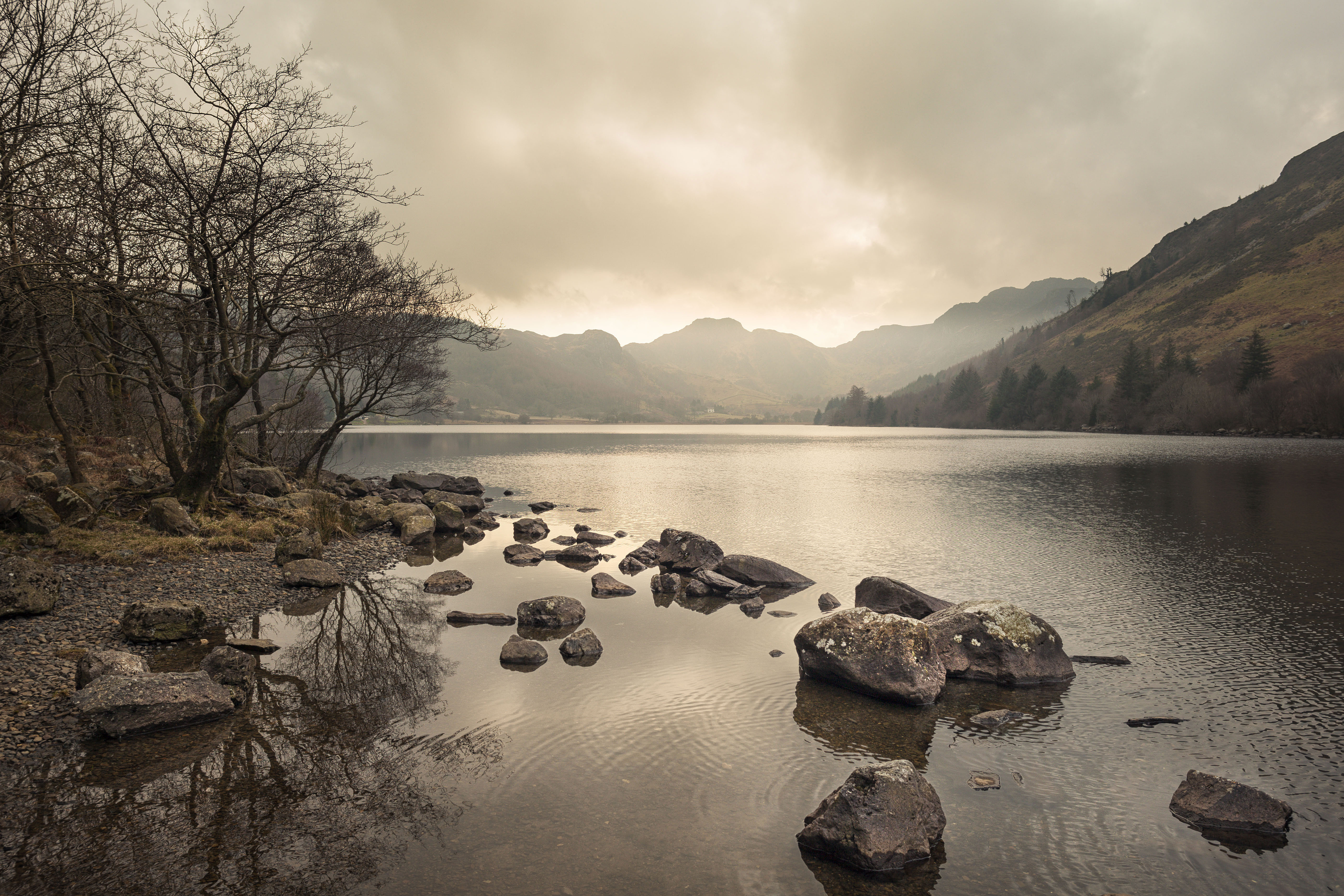
View of Llyn Crafnant

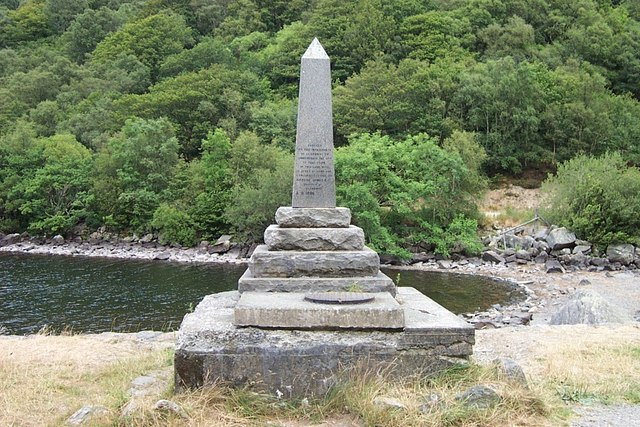
The monument, commemorating the gift of free water to Llanrwst

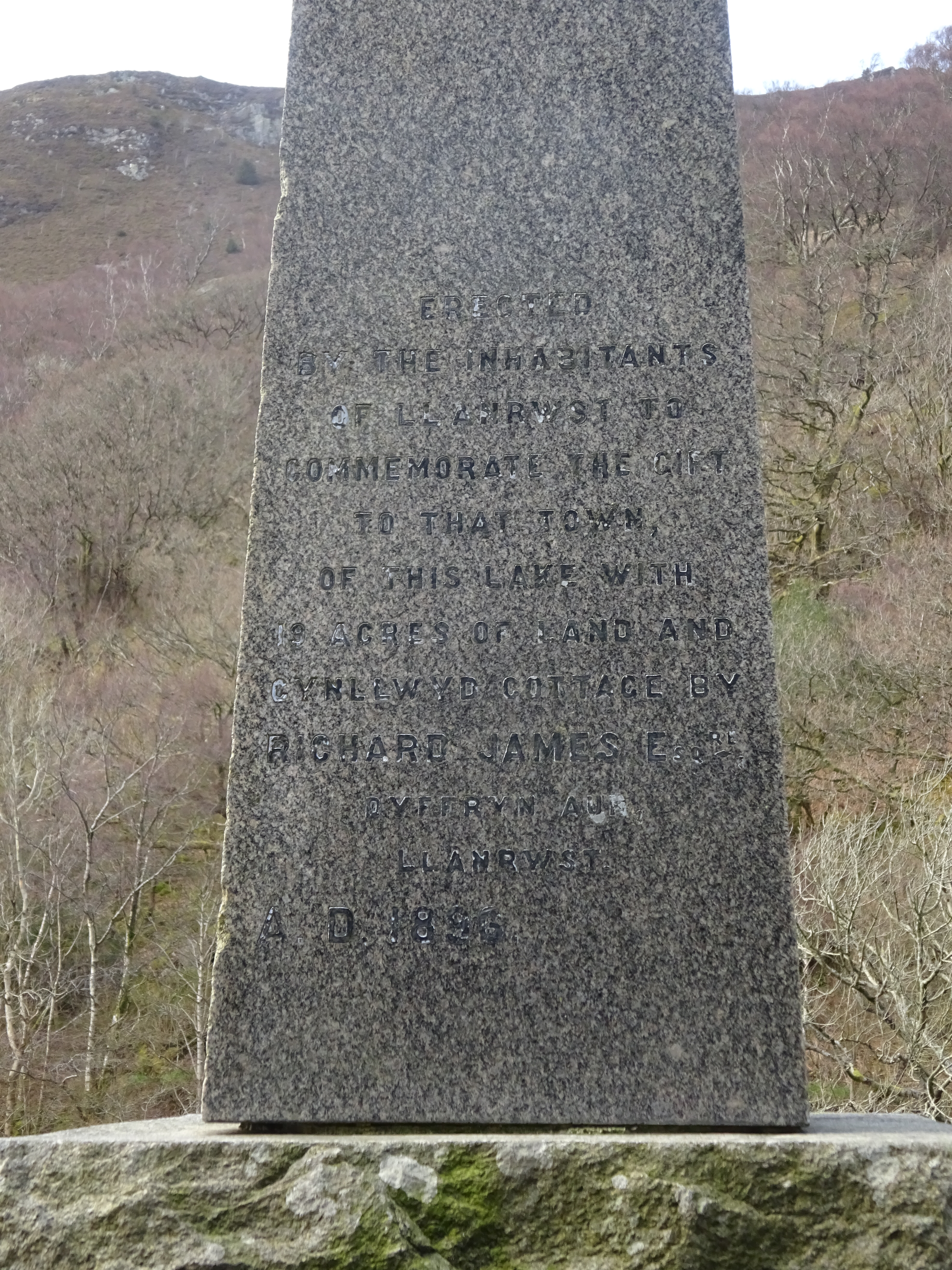

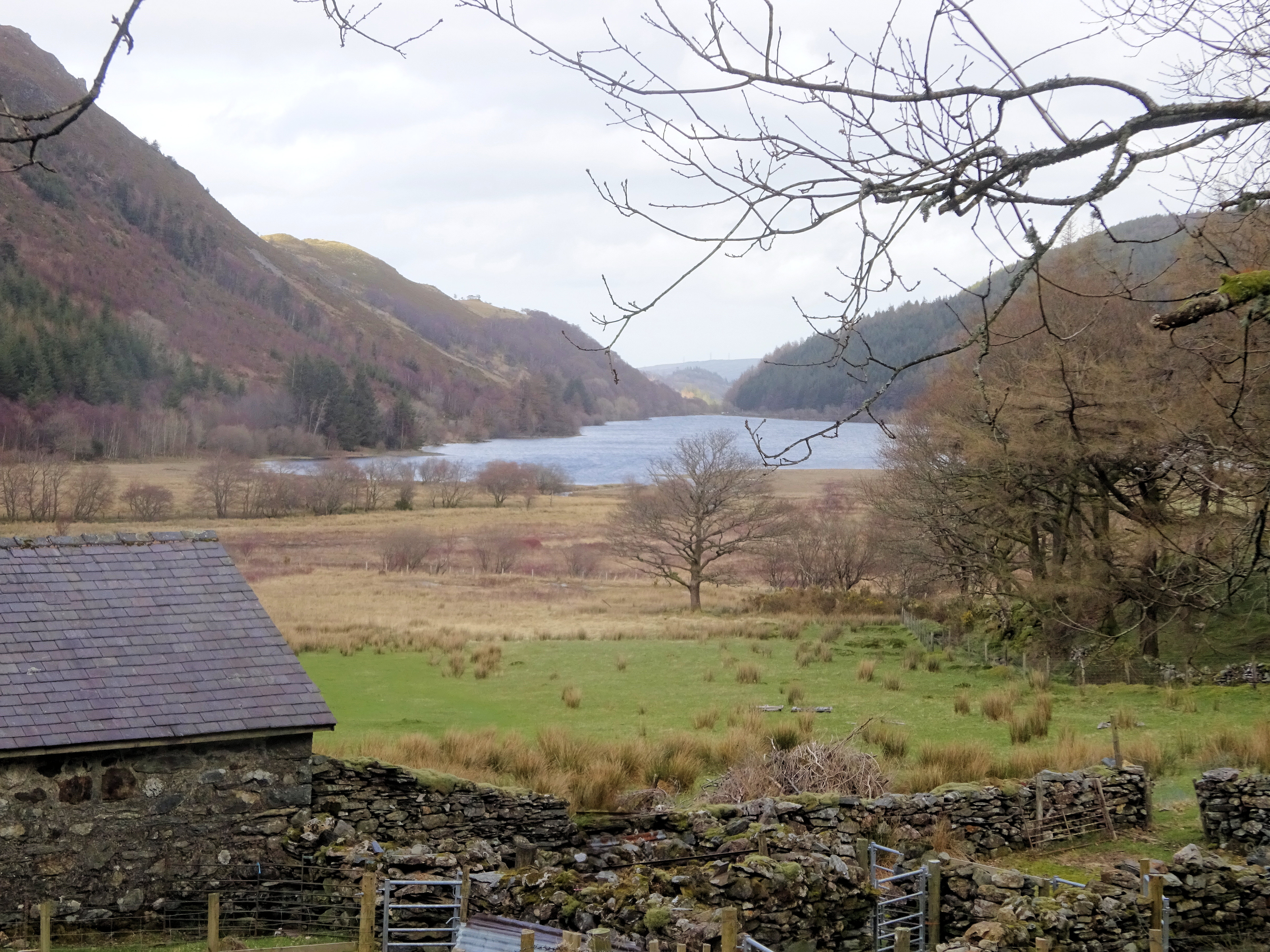
