= Gwydir Forest =

Forest in Snowdonia National Park, Wales

Coordinates: 53.126°N 3.828°W

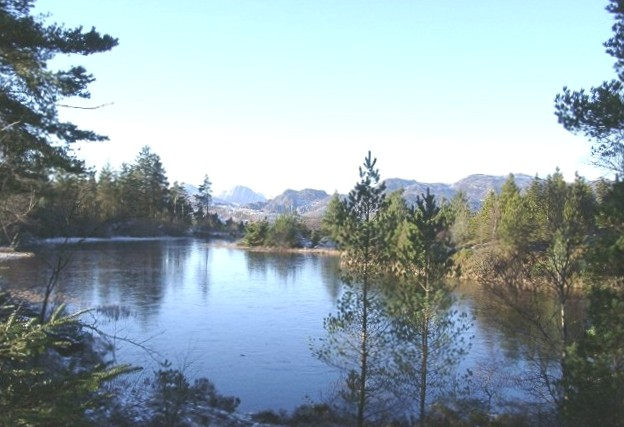
Gwydir Forest lies in an elevated position, affording views towards the Glyderau and Carneddau ranges

Aerial vieo of Gwydir Forest reservoirs, including: Llyn Cyfty, Llyn Sarnau, Llyn Goddionduon and Llyn Tynymynydd

Gwydir Forest, also spelled Gwydyr, is located in Conwy County Borough and the Snowdonia National Park in Wales. It takes its name from the ancient Gwydir Estate, established by the John Wynn family of Gwydir Castle, which owned this area.

Natural Resources Wales uses the alternative spelling (i.e. Gwydyr Forest, Coedwig Gwydyr). Certainly as early as 1536, Leland wrote: "Gwydir lieth two bowshots above the River Conwy. It is a pretty place."

== Geography ==
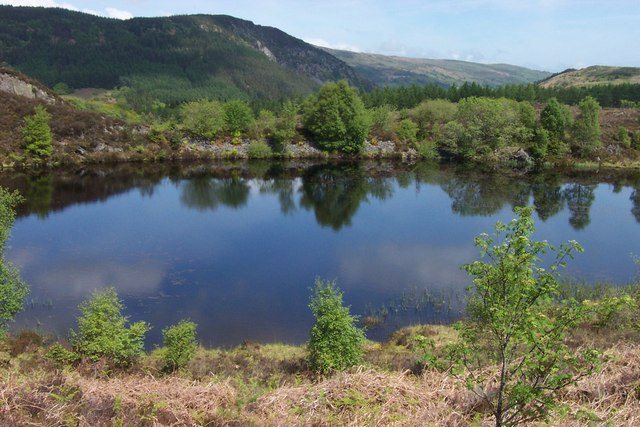
Llyn Bodgynydd Bach, one of the many lakes in the forest

The forest broadly encircles the village of Betws-y-Coed, and much of its midsection lies within the parish. It reaches northwards to the village of Trefriw, and southwards to the village of Penmachno. It covers an area of over 72.5 square kilometres (28.0 sq mi), including 49 square kilometres (19 sq mi) of productive woodland.

Certainly there would have been a certain amount of natural tree growth on these hills thousands of years ago. More recently, records from the 18th century refer to the rafting of timber down the River Conwy. In the 19th century, use was made of the quay at Trefriw for the shipment of timber to the coast. In 1778, referring to Carreg-y-Gwalch, just above Gwydir Uchaf, Thomas Pennant was told that "the noblest oaks in all Wales grew on this rock within living memory."

The forest occupies an undulating plateau, reaching to between 700 and 1,000 feet (210 and 300 m) above sea level, which is divided by the valleys of the rivers Llugwy, Lledr, and Machno, all of which are tributaries of the River Conwy. Despite being a forest, much of it is not dark and enclosed, and it offers fine views over these valleys, with further views to the mountains of the Glyderau, the Carneddau and the Snowdon massif itself.

The forested areas occupy the steep slopes and poorer soils of the plateau, the best of the soil being in the agricultural valley bottoms. Rainfall in the forest varies from under 50 inches (1,300 mm) to over 80 inches (2,000 mm) p.a.

The forest is home to numerous lakes, all of which are reachable by footpaths, and nearly all of which were created to serve the mines of the Forest. In order of size, these include:

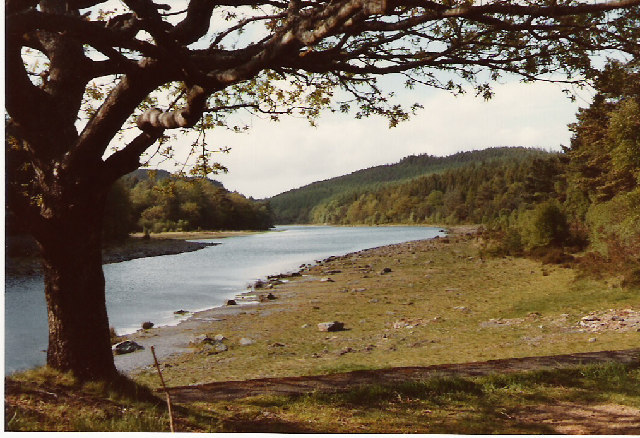
Llyn Parc, with the water at a lower level than normal

- Llyn Crafnant 63 acres (250,000 m^{2})—on the northern edge of the forest
- Llyn Geirionydd 45 acres (180,000 m^{2})
- Llyn Elsi 26 acres (110,000 m^{2})
- Llyn Parc 22 acres (89,000 m^{2})
- Llyn Glangors 15 acres (61,000 m^{2})
- Llyn Bodgynydd 14 acres (57,000 m^{2})
- Llyn Goddionduon 10 acres (40,000 m^{2})
- Llyn Pencraig 5 acres (20,000 m^{2})
- Llyn Bychan 3 acres (12,000 m^{2})
- Llyn Sarnau 3 acres (12,000 m^{2})
- Llyn Tynymynydd 1 acre (4,000 m^{2})

There are also a number of smaller, unnamed lakes.

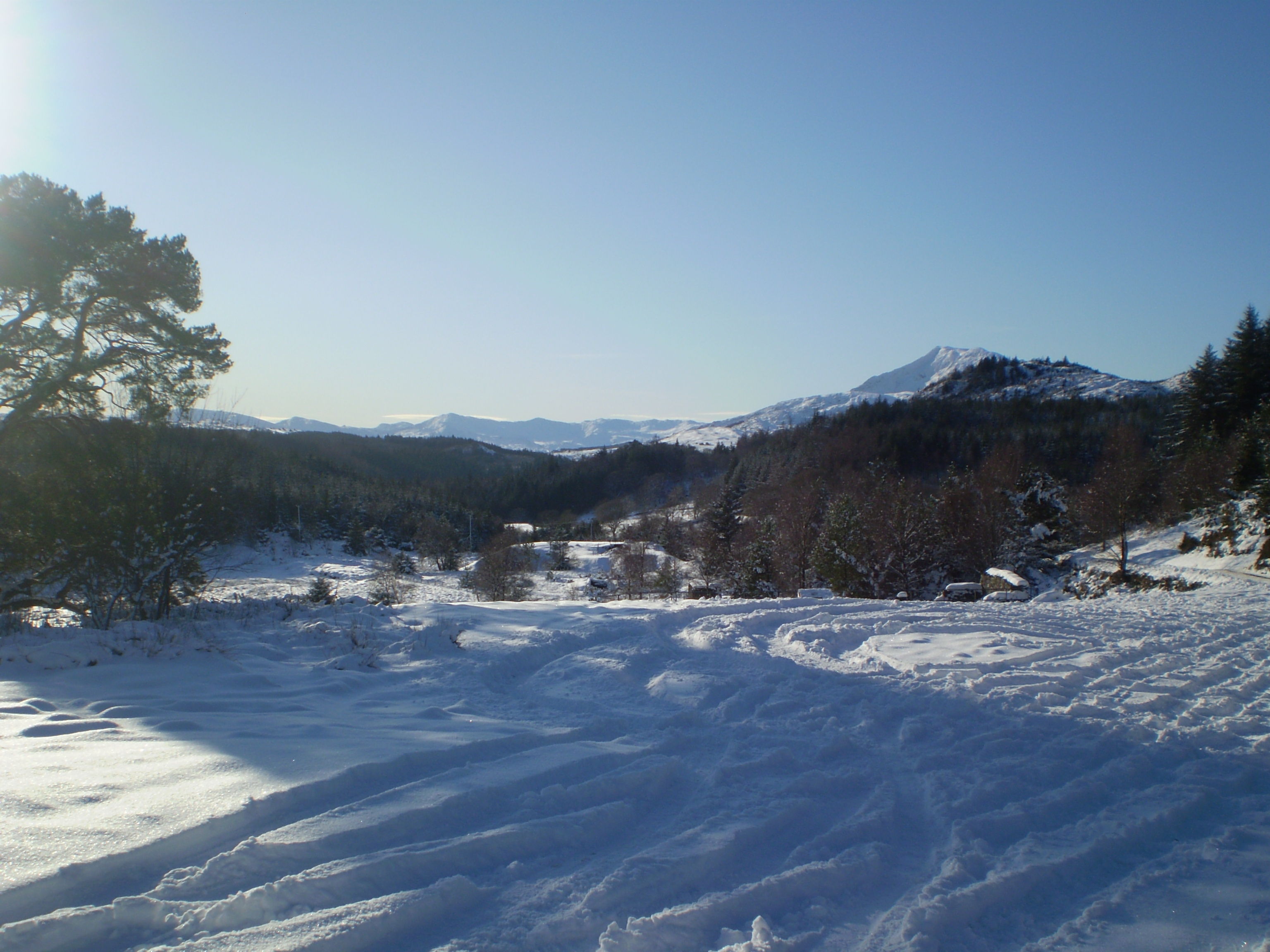
Moel Siabod from Gwydir Forest

== Forestry operations ==
Following the Forestry Act 1919, Gwydir Forest was established by the Forestry Commission in 1921, after much of the land was acquired from Lord Ancaster, whose family had inherited the Wynn estate. The First World War had highlighted a shortage in wood production, and left the area with little natural woodland. Many of the early planters and forestry workers had no experience of forestry, being formerly employed in the forest's mines, and many anecdotes from this era can be found in the book Tales from the Gwydyr Woods. Millions of seedlings were grown in the Diosgydd nursery, and the first areas planted were those that previously had some coverage. Most of the original plantations have now been felled and replanted as part of the forestry cycle.

The majority of the forest is conifer (Sitka spruce, Douglas fir, Japanese larch, Norway spruce and Scots pine), relatively suited to the area's poor, shallow soils, but recent years have seen the increased planting of native broadleaf species such as Welsh Oak, beech and ash. This has largely been done for aesthetic reasons, i.e. to produce variety and to reduce the hard lines produced by conifers. However, commercial reasons will always dictate the need for faster-growing conifers. These have a plant-harvest cycle of between 20 and 40 years (depending on type), whereas oak requires the best part of a century.

The forest still gives direct employment to 75 people, and creates local work for many others. It is estimated that the forest is growing at a rate of 125 tons a day, and is naturally being harvested at much the same rate. At times rights of way in the forest may be closed or restricted where forestry work is being undertaken. This property was built by Sir John Wynn in 1604.

== Tourism ==
The land owned by Natural Resources Wales in Snowdonia National Park amounts to just over 12%, and of the four forest areas, the Gwydir Forest is probably the most popular based on visitor numbers. In 1937, Gwydir was designated a National Forest Park, and since 1993 the heartland of the forest has been accorded the special status of Forest Park. Promotion as an attraction has been an integral part of this designation.

The forest is very accessible by wide tracks, old miners' paths, and long-established forest walks, a number of which follow waymarked routes. This popularity has further increased in recent years after the construction of the Marin Trail (named after the mountain bike manufacturer), a competition-standard mountain bike route, which is approximately 28 kilometres (17 mi) long with 860 metres (2,820 ft) of climbing in all.

Whilst the forest has to be accessible to forest workers' vehicles (there are over 100 miles (160 km) of roads and tracks in the forest), it is not open to private vehicles except on designated Open Days. However, there are a number of forest car parks and most of these have picnic sites. The forest was used as a special stage in the 2013 Wales Rally GB.

== The former mines ==
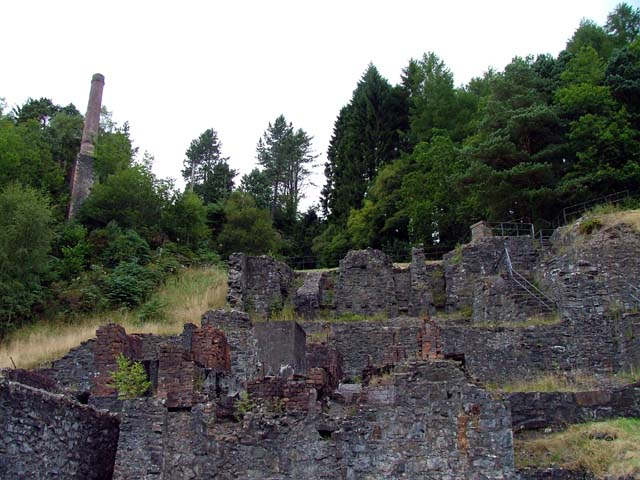
The remains of Hafna mine and mill

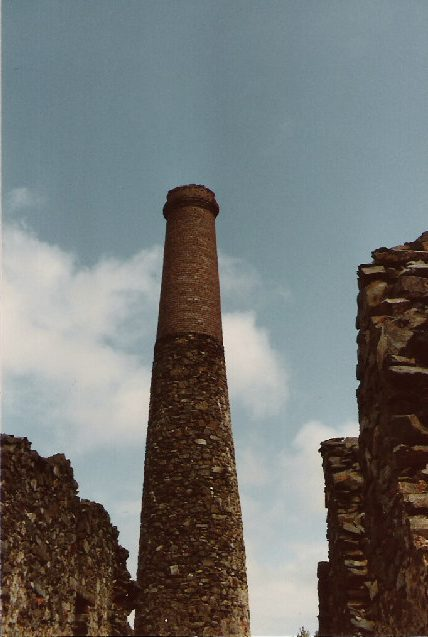
The chimney of the former Llanrwst mine

Today the forest is dotted with the remains of former metal mines: old engine houses, waste tips, reservoirs, and the surface remains of the pits themselves. This, however, is nothing compared to the labyrinth of tunnels below the surface, which run to many miles in length. Predominantly lead and zinc were mined, and the heyday of metal mining in the forest was between 1850 and 1919, although mining on a small scale began in the early 17th century. Indeed, whilst evidence is difficult to find following centuries of subsequent mining work, it is more than likely that a certain amount of shallow mining was undertaken by the Romans—the Roman road of Sarn Helen passed through the forest.

The principal mines were those of:

- Parc Mine
- Hafna Mine
- Llanrwst Mine
- Cyffty Mine
- Pandora Mine
- Aberllyn Mine

These lie in the central part of the forest around the area known as Nant Bwlch-yr-haearn.

Parc Mine was the largest and most successful of these mines. It opened in 1855 as the Gwydyr Park Consols and was worked intermittently up to the 1940s. By World War II it was the only mine to be still working. It reopened in 1950, and it produced more lead and zinc ore between 1953 and 1957 than the whole of the Llanrwst area in the century from 1848. Despite some subsequent modernisation it closed down in c. 1960.

The first four of the mines listed above have been linked by the "Miners Trail", a circular route marked with information boards. Their remains can also easily be seen from the unclassified road that runs from Gwydir Castle (on the B5106 road) via Nant Bwlch-yr-haearn to the Ugly House on the A5.

Mention has already been made of the numerous lakes in the forest, and indeed in this central area they were all, almost without exception, created or enlarged to provide reservoirs for the mine workings. In most cases water was run from these via leats, which turned water-wheels to power machinery on site.

On acquisition of the land by the then Forestry Commission, efforts were made to make former mine workings safe, and before increased public access further extensive works were carried out by the National Park Authority, with funding from the Welsh Development Agency and support from the Conservation Council (now the Countryside Council for Wales, the Welsh Mines Society, and Gwynedd Archaeological Trust. Given the opportunities that the wealth of tunnels below the mines offers, it is hoped that future identification of safe areas will allow the re-opening of some areas for limited access.

Much has been written about the mines, most notably a series of seven books called Mines of the Gwydyr Forest.

== Rare plants and animals ==
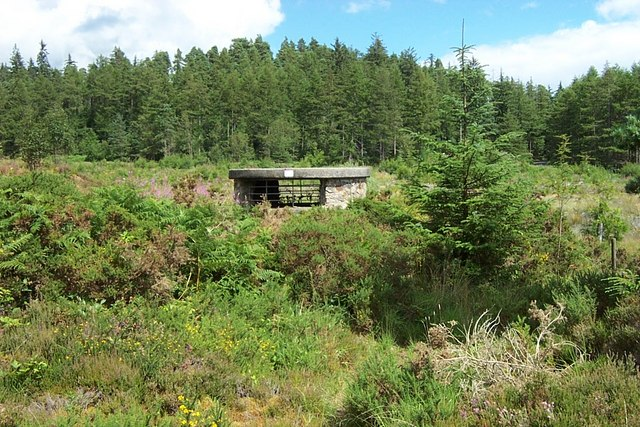
A capped former mine shaft. These are now often a home to bats.

The piles of rock waste on the former mine sites have proved to be ideal breeding grounds for rare plants, and have resulted in the designation of part of the forest as a Site of Special Scientific Interest (SSSI). This very specialised group of plants are known as metallophytes, being found only around old metal workings. They are able to extract minerals from the rock that would kill other species. Principal species found on the Gwydir mine sites are pennycress and forked spleenwort.

The capping of the mine shafts for safety reasons has resulted in an ideal environment for bats, and the designation of a Special Area of Conservation (SAC). In February 2001, a lesser horseshoe bat (Rhinolophus hipposideros) was found hibernating in a disused mine in the forest, the furthest north in the UK that this species had been found. The bat had been ringed as a juvenile in 1999 in the Forest of Dean.

Despite a lack of photographic evidence, there have been over 100 reported sightings of pine martens in north Wales in the last decade, and pine marten DNA was recovered from a dropping found in Gwydir Forest in 1996.

== See also ==
- Caerdroia § Gwydir Forest
- Grey Mare's Tail - waterfall
- Klondyke mill
