= Snowdonia =

Mountainous region and national park in North Wales

- Eryri (Welsh)
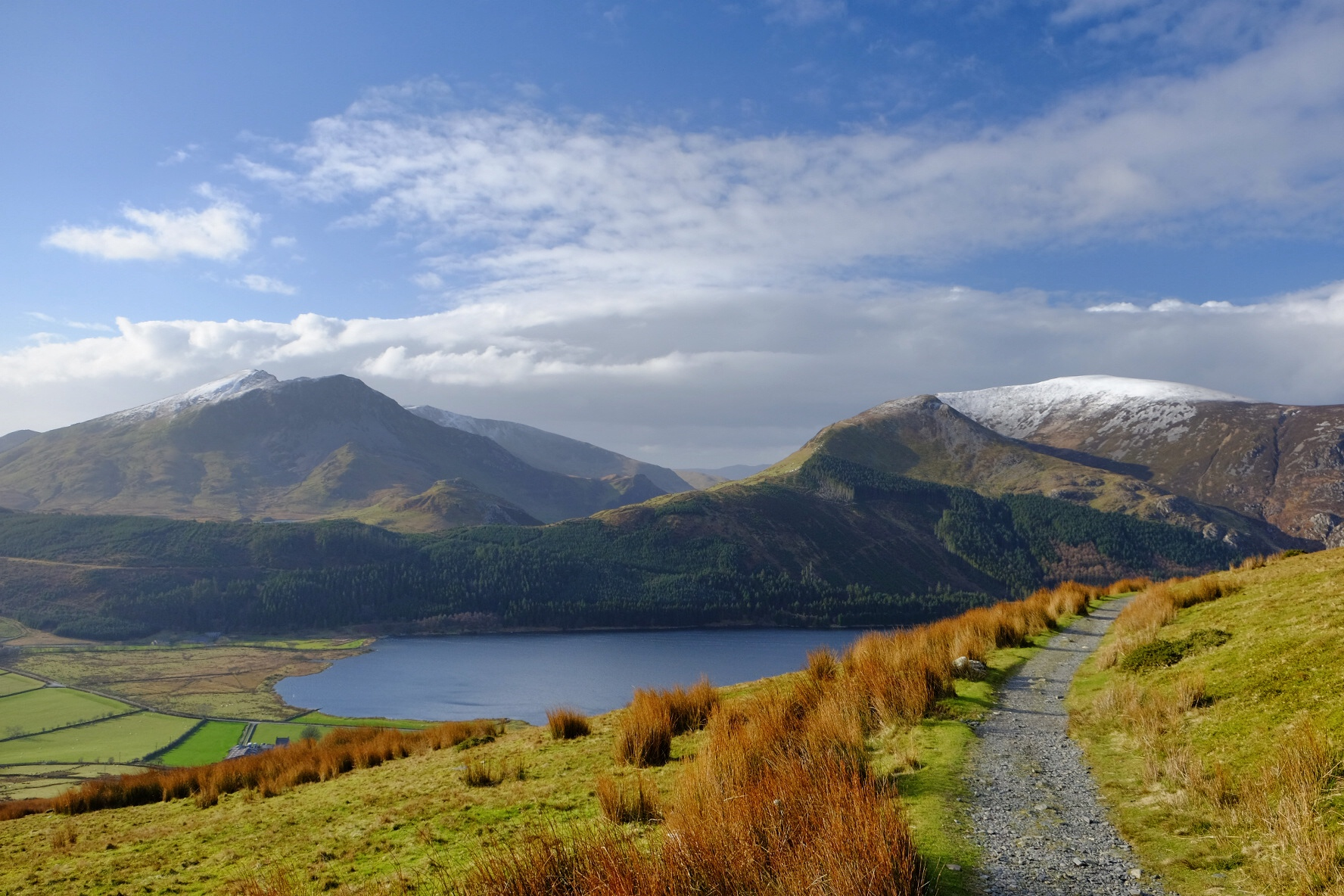
- View of Llyn Cwellyn from the Snowdon Ranger path

Highest point
- Peak: Snowdon
- Elevation: 1,085 m (3,560 ft)
- Coordinates: 53°4′6.59″N 4°4′34.43″W

Dimensions
- Area: 2,130 km^{2} (820 mi^{2}) (national park)

Geography
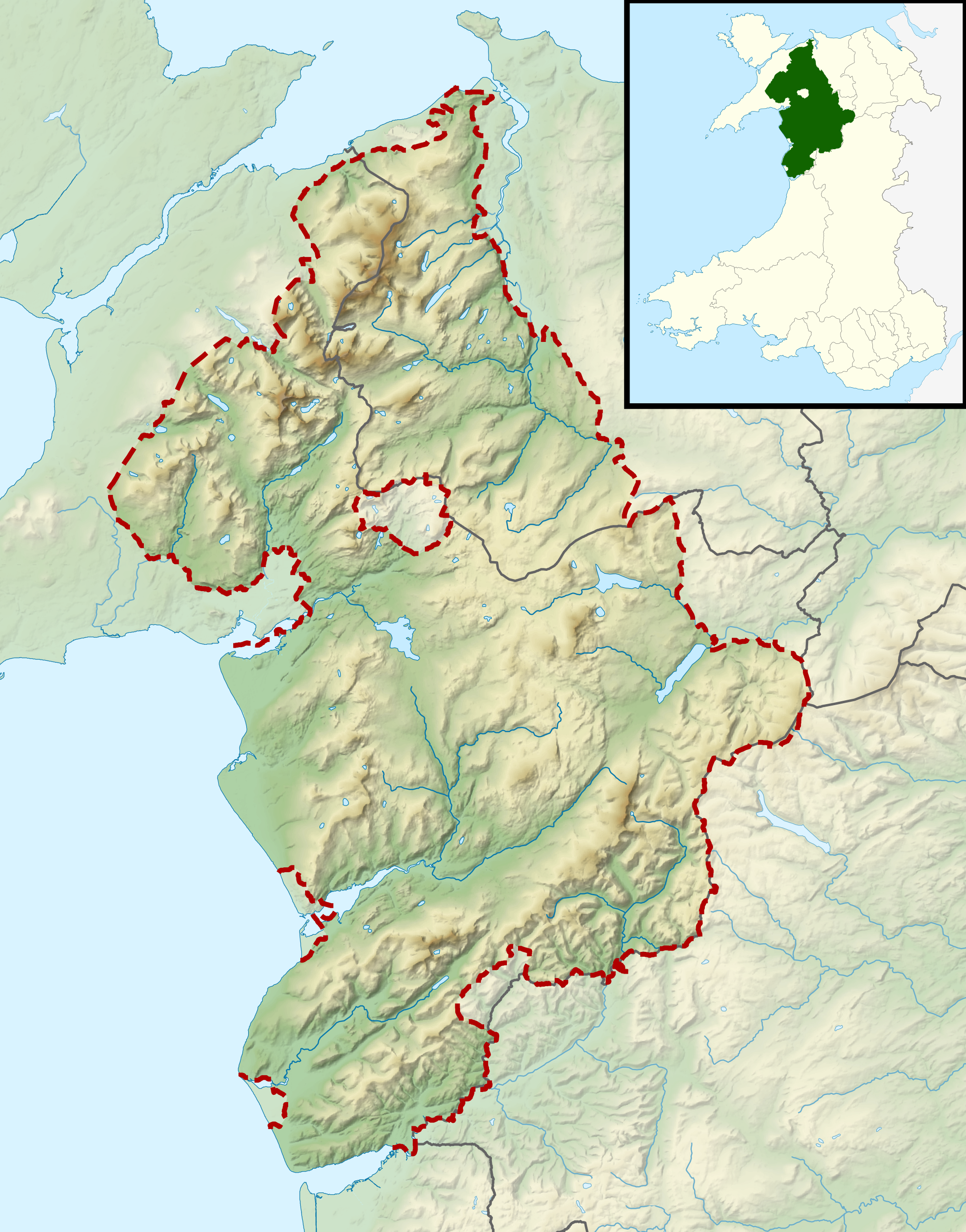
- Relief map of Snowdonia, within the national park boundaries
- Location: North Wales
- Country: Wales, United Kingdom
- Northern ranges: Carneddau; Glyderau; Moel Hebog; Moelwynion; Snowdon
- Southern ranges: Rhinogydd; Cadair Idris; Aran; Dyfi Hills
- Parent range: Glyderau

Geology
- Orogeny: Caledonian
- Rock ages: Cambrian; Ordovician
- Rock types: Igneous; sedimentary
- Snowdonia National Park; Eryri National Park; Parc Cenedlaethol Eryri (Welsh)
- IUCN category V (protected landscape/seascape)
- Location: Conwy and Gwynedd (Wales)
- Coordinates: 52°54′N 3°51′W
- Area: 823 sq mi (2,130 km^{2})
- Established: 1951
- Governing body: Snowdonia National Park Authority
- Website: eryri.gov.wales

Snowdonia, or Eryri (Welsh: [ɛˈrəri]), is a mountainous region and national park in North Wales. It contains all 15 mountains in Wales over 3000 feet high, including the country's highest, Snowdon (Yr Wyddfa), which is 1,085 metres (3,560 ft) tall. These peaks are all part of the Snowdon, Glyderau, and Carneddau ranges in the north of the region. The lower Moelwynion and Moel Hebog ranges lie immediately to the south.

The national park has an area of 823 square miles (2,130 km^{2}), and covers most of central and southern Gwynedd and the western part of Conwy County Borough. This is much larger than the area traditionally considered Snowdonia, and in addition to the five ranges above includes the Rhinogydd, Cadair Idris, and Aran ranges and the Dyfi Hills. It also includes most of the coast between Porthmadog and Aberdyfi. The park was the first of the three national parks of Wales to be designated, in October 1951, and the third in the UK after the Peak District and Lake District, which were established in April and May 1951, respectively. The park received 3.89 million visitors in 2015.

== Toponymy ==
The name "Snowdon" means "snow hill" and is derived from the Old English elements "snāw" and "dūn", the latter meaning "hill". It is first recorded as Snawdune in 1095. "Snowdonia" is derived from the name of the mountain and is first recorded in 1284, but there is no evidence it survived in common use until it was re-popularised in the 19th century. The Welsh name of the mountain is Yr Wyddfa, and is unrelated to the name of the area.

Eryri is first recorded in 1191. It likely derived from eryr, meaning "ridge", with the collective form eryri referring to the area around Snowdon. A popular interpretation is that the name means "place of the eagle", as eryr also means "eagle" and the two meanings are probably cognate.

== Extent ==
Before the designation of the national park in 1951, "Snowdonia" was generally used to refer to a smaller upland area of northern Gwynedd centred on the Snowdon massif. F. J. North, writing in 1949, states that "When the Committee delineated provisional boundaries [of the national park], they included areas some distance beyond Snowdonia proper".

In George Borrow's 1862 Wild Wales, he states that "Snowdon or Eryri is no single hill, but a mountainous region, the loftiest part of which [is] called Y Wyddfa", making a distinction between the summit of the mountain and the surrounding massif. The 1925 Mountains of Snowdonia by H. Carr & G. Lister defines "Eryri" as "composed of the two cantrefs of Arfon and Arllechwedd, and the two commotes of Nant Conwy and Eifionydd", which corresponds to Caernarfonshire with the exception of the Creuddyn Peninsula and the south-west of the Llŷn Peninsula.

A 1941 article by Thomas Cotterill Warrington in the Geographical Association's Geography journal described "Snowdonia" as a "tourist's or mountaineer's term" and defined it as:

the district of which Pen y Gwryd is the centre. It is bounded by the Conway valley as far as the Fairy Glen, thence by the Lledr Valley to Dolwyddelen, then over the hills to the Ffestiniog Valley and Portmadoc, and from that point by the road to Carnarvon by Dolbenmaen and Llanllyfni.

In the same article, "Eryri" is defined as the above area and the highlands between Bwlch Mawr and Yr Eifl, with reference to the definition given in The Mountains of Snowdonia.

In the 1946 book National Parks for Britain, Henry Chessell defines Snowdonia is the "mountain district of Carnarvonshire", including the Snowdon, Carneddau, Glyderau, Moel Hebog, and Moelwynion massifs. The area of Merionethshire to the south, bounded by the "glen" between Dolgellau and Trawsfynydd to the east and the Afon Mawddach to the south and including Cadair Idris, is described as "really a southern continuation of Snowdonia".

== National park ==
Eryri National Park (Welsh: Parc Cenedlaethol Eryri), legally and previously officially named Snowdonia National Park in English, was established in October 1951 under the National Parks and Access to the Countryside Act 1949. The 1947 Hobhouse Report, the precursor to the Act, recommended the creation of a "North Wales National Park" with boundaries similar to those ultimately adopted, but including the area around Lake Vyrnwy and excluding the entire coastal strip from Harlech to Barmouth. It was the third national park to be established in the United Kingdom, following the Peak District and Lake District in April and May 1951.

The park has an area 823 square miles (2,130 km^{2}), covering much of central and southern Gwynedd and the western part of Conwy County Borough, and has 23 miles (37 km) of coastline. The Hobhouse Report recommended against including the town of Blaenau Ffestiniog in the national park owing to the "disfigurement" caused by its slate quarries, and it forms an enclave near the centre of the area. The coastal towns of Tywyn and Barmouth are also excluded.

The park is governed by a national park authority, which was established in 1995 and has 18 members: 9 appointed by Gwynedd Council, 3 by Conwy County Borough Council, and 6 by the Welsh Government to represent the national interest. The authority's main offices are at Penrhyndeudraeth. Unlike national parks in other countries, national parks in the United Kingdom consist of both public and private land under a central planning authority. More than 26,000 people live within the park, of whom 58.6% could speak Welsh in 2011. While most of the land is either open or mountainous, there is a significant amount of agricultural activity within the park.

The national park authority used the name "Snowdonia" in English-language contexts until November 2022, when it announced that it would begin a transition to using only "Eryri" in order to prioritise the Welsh language name for the area; it also began using Yr Wyddfa in preference to "Snowdon" to refer to the mountain. Following a two-year transition period, the authority announced in November 2024 that the changes would be kept due to its success in gaining support and its adoption by many businesses and by the media. The authority also announced that the national park logo would be changed to remove "Snowdonia".

== Geology ==
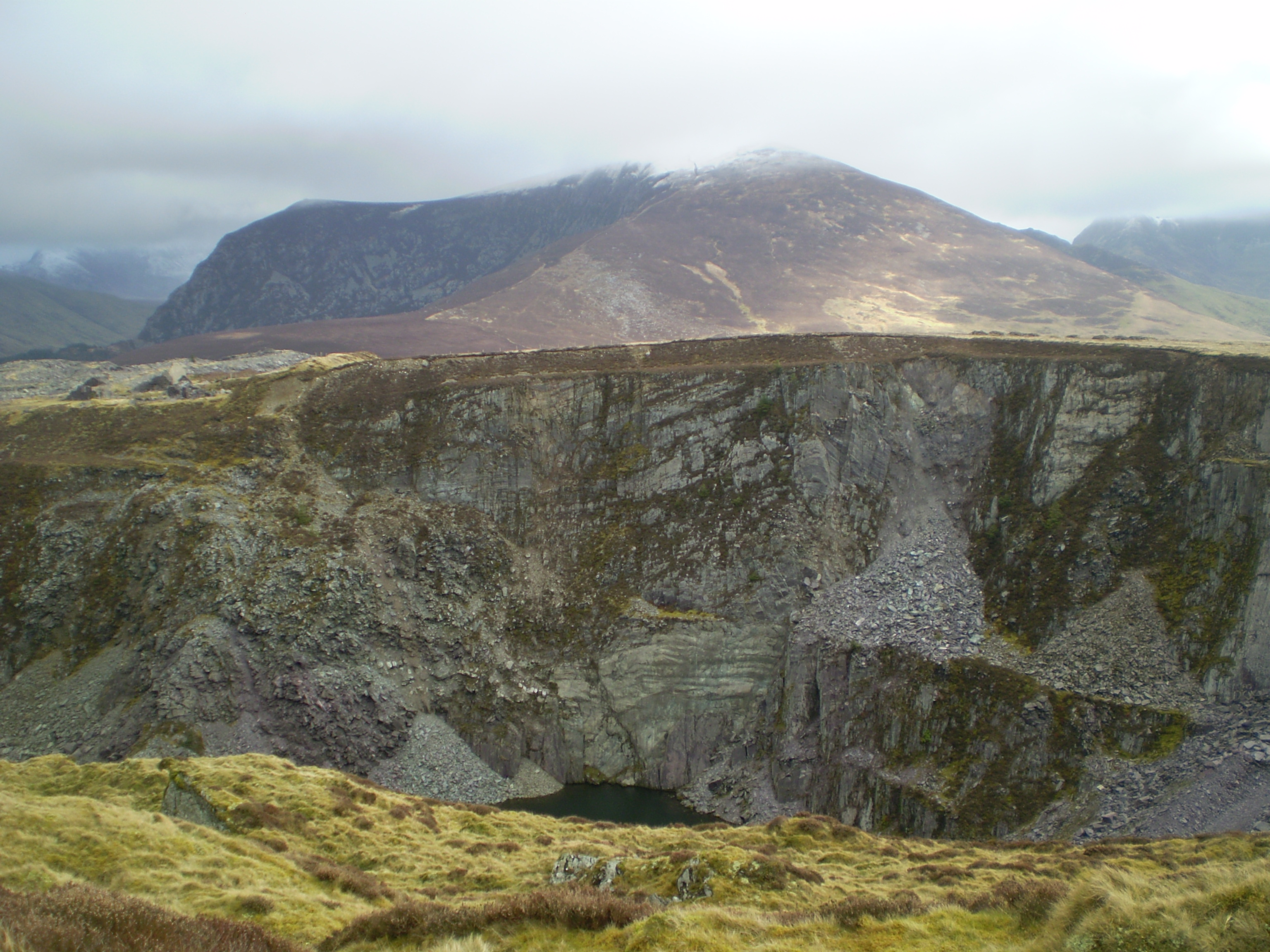
Slate quarry with Mynydd Mawr in the background

The geology of Snowdonia is key to the area's character. Glaciation during a succession of ice ages has carved a distinctive rocky landscape from a heavily faulted and folded succession of sedimentary and igneous rocks. The last ice age ended only just over 11,500 years ago, leaving features attractive to visitors, which have also played a part in the development of geological science and continue to provide a focus for educational visits. Visiting Cwm Idwal in 1841, Charles Darwin realised that the landscape was the product of glaciation. The bedrock dates largely from the Cambrian and Ordovician periods with intrusions of Ordovician and Silurian age associated with the Caledonian Orogeny. There are smaller areas of Silurian age sedimentary rocks in the south and northeast and of Cenozoic era strata on the Cardigan Bay coast, though the latter are concealed by more recent deposits. Low grade metamorphism of Cambrian and Ordovician mudstones has resulted in the slates, the extraction of which once formed the mainstay of the area's economy.

== Climate ==
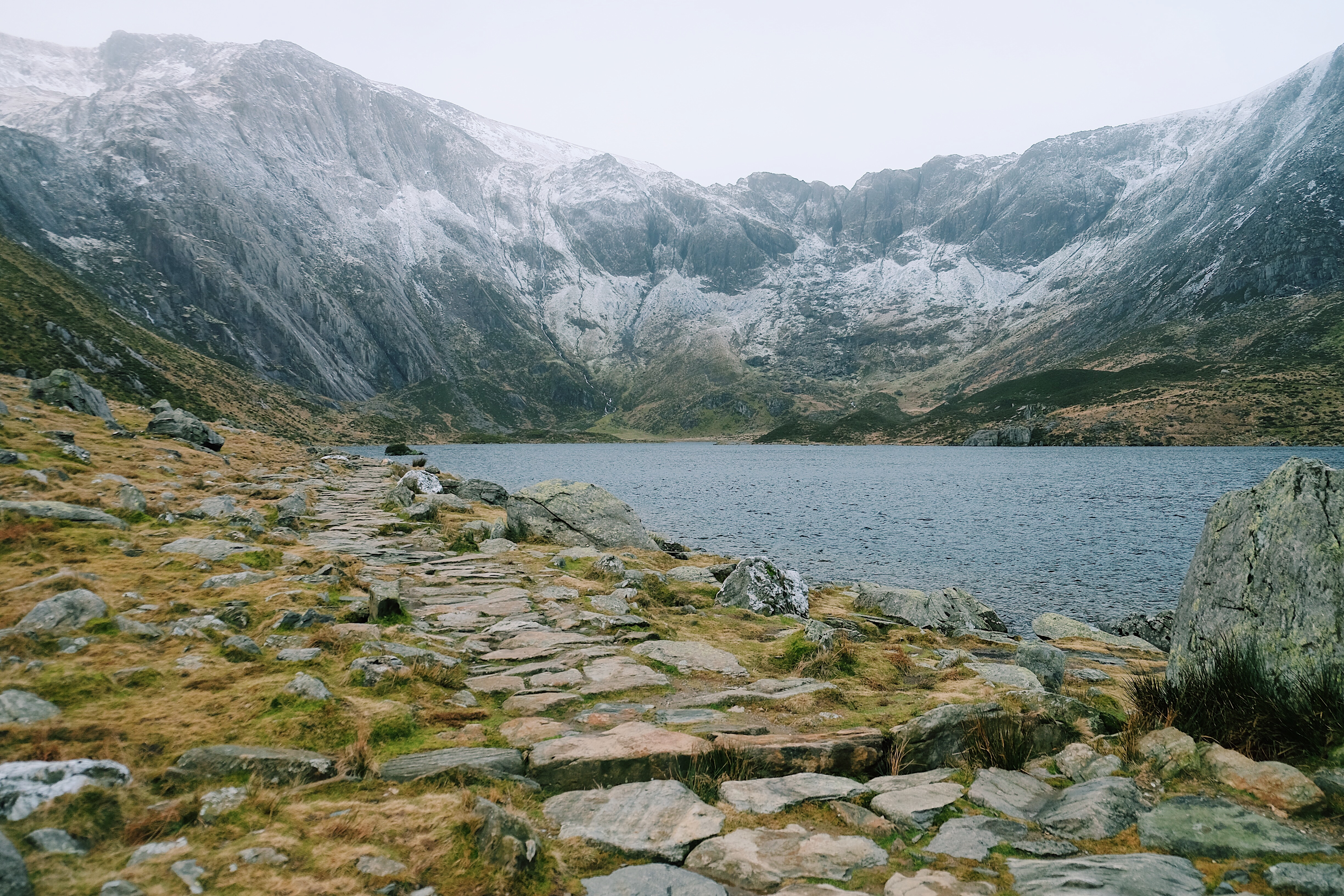
Snowdonia in Winter

Snowdonia is one of the wettest parts of the United Kingdom; Crib Goch in Snowdonia is the wettest spot in the United Kingdom, with an average rainfall of 4,473 millimetres (176.1 in) a year over the 30-year period prior to the mid-2000s. (There is a rainfall gauge at 713 metres (2,339 feet) on the slopes below Crib Goch.)

== Geography ==
=== Mountains ===
The principal ranges of the traditional Snowdonia are the Snowdon massif itself, the Glyderau, the Carneddau, the Moelwynion and the Moel Hebog range. All of Wales' 3000ft mountains are to be found within the first three of these massifs and are most popular with visitors. To their south within the wider national park are the Rhinogydd and the Cadair Idris and Aran Fawddwy ranges. Besides these well-defined areas are a number of mountains which are less readily grouped, though various guidebook writers have assigned them into groups such as the "Arenigs", the "Tarrens" and the "Dyfi hills".

Snowdon's summit at 1,085 metres (3,560 feet) is the highest in Wales and the highest in Britain south of the Scottish Highlands. At 905 metres (2,969 feet), Aran Fawddwy is the highest in Wales outside of northern Snowdonia; Cadair Idris, at 893 metres (2,930 feet), is next in line.

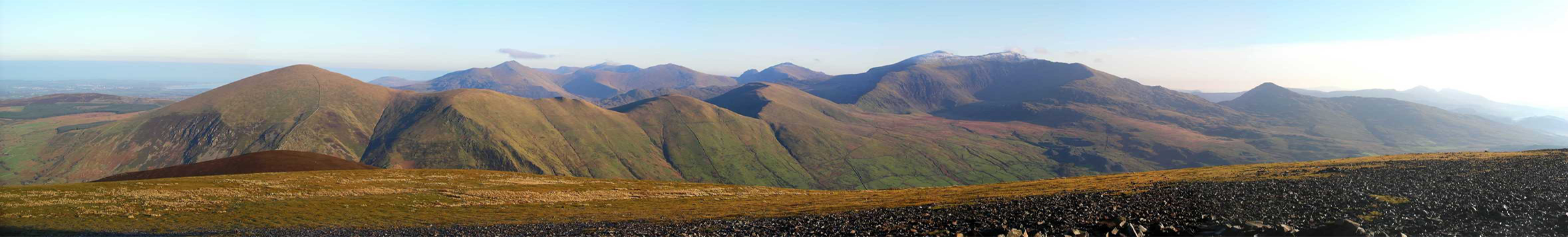
Panorama of some of the Snowdon Massif including Snowdon (centre right) taken from Mynydd Mawr. The Glyderau are visible in the distance.

=== Rivers and lakes ===
Rivers draining the area directly into Cardigan Bay are typically short and steep. From north to south they include:

- the Glaslyn and Dwyryd, which share a common estuary,
- the Mawddach and its tributaries the Wnion and the Eden,
- the smaller Dysynni
- and on the park's southern margin the Dyfi.

A series of rivers drain to the north coast. Largest of these is the Conwy on the park's eastern margin, which along with the Ogwen drains into Conwy Bay. Further west the Seiont and Gwyrfai empty into the western end of the Menai Strait. Part of the east of the national park is within the upper Dee (Dyfrydwy) catchment and includes Llyn Tegid (Bala Lake), the largest natural water body in Wales.

A fuller list of the rivers and tributaries within the area is found at List of rivers of Wales.

Aerial video of parts of Northern Snowdonia (2014)

There are few natural bodies of water of any size in Wales; Snowdonia is home to most. Besides Llyn Tegid, a few lakes occupy glacial troughs, including Llyn Padarn and Llyn Peris at Llanberis and Tal-y-llyn Lake south of Cadair Idris. Llyn Dinas, Llyn Gwynant, and Llyn Cwellyn to the south and west of Snowdon feature in this category, as do Llyn Cowlyd and Llyn Ogwen on the margins of the Carneddau. There are numerous small lakes occupying glacial cirques, owing to the intensity of past glacial action in Snowdonia. Known generically as tarns, examples are Llyn Llydaw, Glaslyn and Llyn Du'r Arddu on Snowdon, Llyn Idwal within the Glyderau and Llyn Cau on Cadair Idris.

There are two large wholly man-made bodies of water in the area, Llyn Celyn and Llyn Trawsfynydd, whilst a number of the natural lakes have had their levels artificially raised. Marchlyn Mawr reservoir and Ffestiniog Power Station's Llyn Stwlan are two cases where natural tarns have been dammed as part of pumped storage hydro-electric schemes.

A fuller list of the lakes within the area is found at List of lakes of Wales. In 2023, the park standardised its Welsh language lake names, to be also used in English.

=== Coast ===
The national park meets the Irish Sea coast within Cardigan Bay between the Dovey estuary in the south and the Dwyryd estuary. The larger part of that frontage is characterised by dune systems, the largest of which are Morfa Dyffryn and Morfa Harlech. These two locations have two of the largest sand/shingle spits in Wales. The Mawddach and Dwyryd estuaries form the largest indentations, and have large expanses of intertidal sands and coastal marsh which are especially important for wildlife: see #Natural history. The northern tip of the national park extends to the north coast of Wales at Penmaen-bach Point, west of Conwy, where precipitous cliffs have led to the road and railway tunnels.

=== Settlements ===
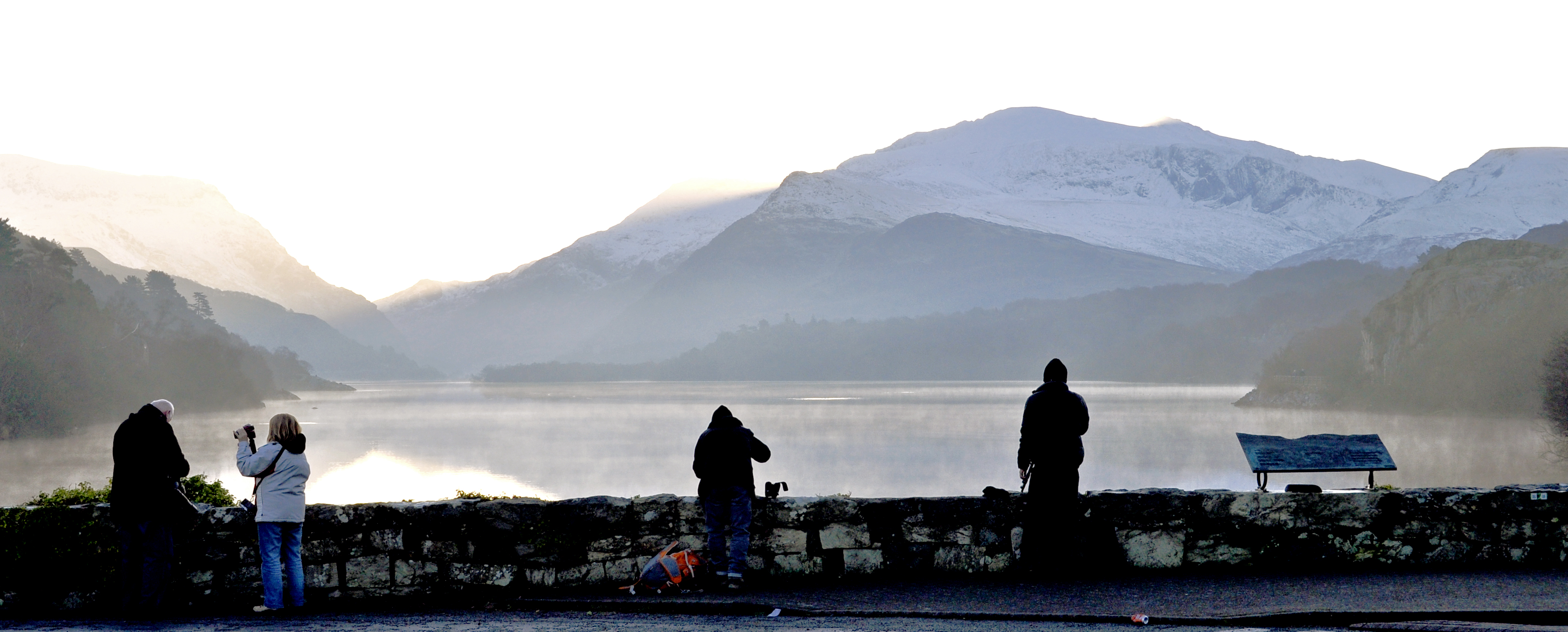
Sunrise over Snowdonia

There are only three towns within the park boundary, though there are several more immediately beyond it. Dolgellau is the most populous followed by Bala on the eastern boundary and then Harlech overlooking Tremadog Bay. More populous than these is the town of Blaenau Ffestiniog, which is within an exclave, that is to say it is surrounded by the national park but excluded from it, whilst the towns of Tywyn and Barmouth on the Cardigan Bay coast are within coastal exclaves. Llanrwst in the east, Machynlleth in the south and Porthmadog and Penrhyndeudraeth in the west are immediately beyond the boundary but still identified with the park; indeed the last of these hosts the headquarters of the Snowdonia National Park Authority. Similarly the local economies of the towns of Conwy, Bethesda, and Llanberis in the north are inseparably linked to the national park as they provide multiple visitor services. The lower terminus of the Snowdon Mountain Railway is at Llanberis. Though adjacent to it, Llanfairfechan and Penmaenmawr are less obviously linked to the park.

There are numerous smaller settlements within the national park: prominent amongst these are the eastern 'gateway' village of Betws-y-Coed, Aberdyfi on the Dovey (Dyfi) estuary and the small village of Beddgelert each of which attract large numbers of visitors. Other sizeable villages are Llanuwchllyn at the southwest end of Llyn Tegid (Bala Lake), Dyffryn Ardudwy, Corris, Trawsfynydd, Llanbedr, Trefriw and Dolwyddelan.

=== Transport ===
==== Roads ====
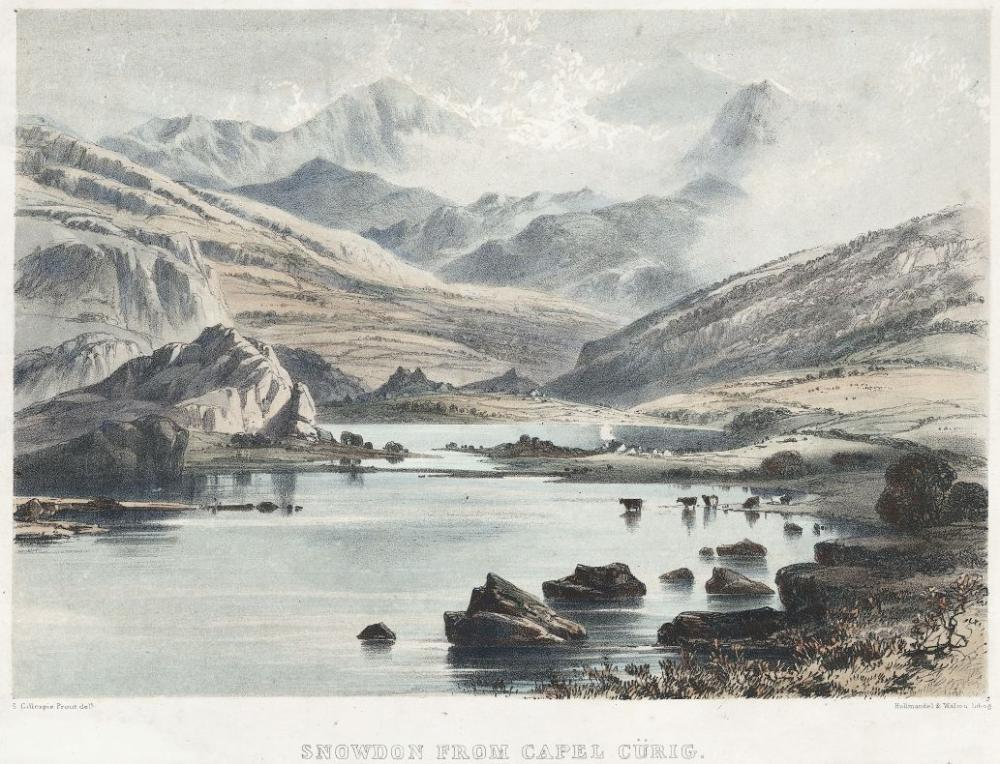
Snowdon from Capel Curig

Six primary routes serve Snowdonia, the busiest of which is the A55, a dual carriageway which runs along the north coast and provides strategic road access to the northern part of the national park. The most important north–south route within the park is the A470 running from the A55 south past Betws-y-Coed to Blaenau Ffestiniog to Dolgellau. It exits the park a few miles to the southeast near Mallwyd. From Dolgellau, the A494 runs to Bala whilst the A487 connects with Machynlleth. The A487 loops around the northwest of the park from Bangor via Caernarfon to Porthmadog before turning in land to meet the A470 east of Maentwrog. The A5 was built as a mail coach road by Thomas Telford between London and Holyhead; it enters the park near Pentrefoelas and leaves it near Bethesda. Other A class roads provide more local links; the A493 down the Dovey valley from Machynlleth and up the coast to Tywyn then back up the Mawddach valley to Dolgellau, the A496 from Dolgellau down the north side of the Mawddach to Barmouth then north up the coast via Harlech to Maentwrog. The A4212 connecting Bala with Trawsfynydd is relatively modern having been laid out in the 1960s in connection with the construction of Llyn Celyn. Three further roads thread their often twisting and narrow way through the northern mountains; A4085 links Penrhyndeudraeth with Caernarfon, the A4086 links Capel Curig with Caernarfon via Llanberis and the A498 links Tremadog with the A4086 at Pen-y-Gwryd. Other roads of note include that from Llanuwchllyn up Cwm Cynllwyd to Dinas Mawddwy via the 545 metres (1,788 feet) high pass of Bwlch y Groes, the second highest tarmacked public road in Wales and the minor road running northwest and west from Llanuwchllyn towards Bronaber via the 531 metres (1,742 feet) high pass of Bwlch Pen-feidiog.

==== Railways ====
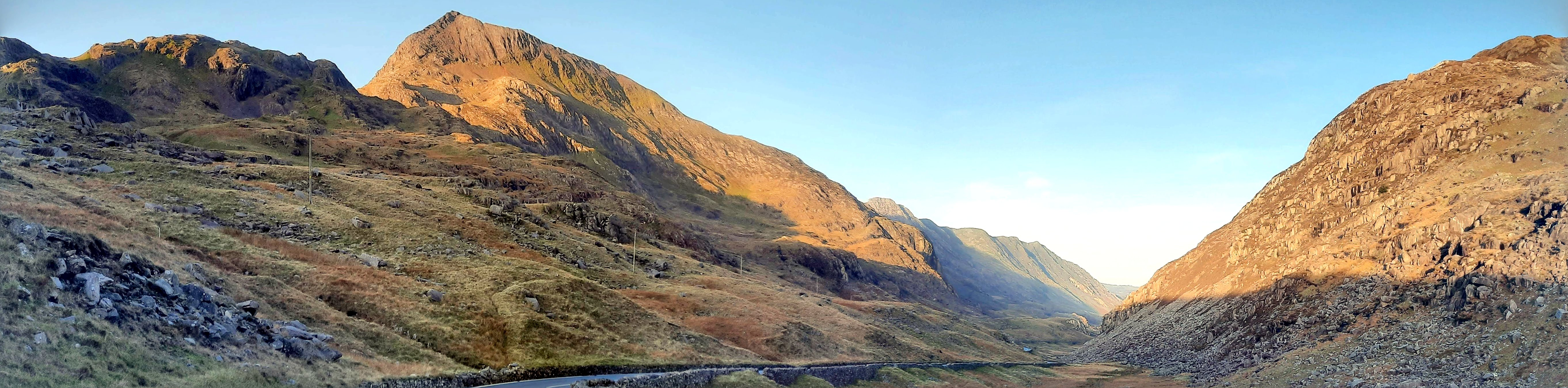
Pen-y-Pass, Snowdonia national park road

- The double track North Wales Coast Line passes along the northern boundary of the park between Conwy and Bangor, briefly entering it at Penmaen-bach Point, where it is in a tunnel. Stations serve the communities of Conwy, Penmaenmawr, Llanfairfechan and Bangor.
- The single-track Conwy Valley Line runs south from Llandudno Junction, and enters the park north of Betws-y-coed, which is served by a station, then continues west up the Lledr valley by way of further stations at Pont-y-pant, Dolwyddelan and Roman Bridge. After passing through a tunnel, the passenger line now terminates at Blaenau Ffestiniog railway station, where it connects with the Ffestiniog Railway.

Before 1961 the route continued as the Bala and Ffestiniog Railway via Trawsfynydd to Bala, joining another former route along the Dee valley which ran southwest via Dolgellau to join the still extant coastal Cambrian Line south of Barmouth.

- The Pwllheli branch of the Cambrian Line splits from the Aberystwyth branch at Dovey Junction and continues northwards via stations at Aberdovey, Tywyn, Tonfanau, Llwyngwril, Fairbourne and Morfa Mawddach to Barmouth where it crosses the Mawddach estuary by the Grade II* listed wooden Barmouth Bridge, a structure which also provides for walkers and cyclists. Continuing northwards, further stations serve Llanaber, Tal-y-bont, Dyffryn Ardudwy, Llanbedr, Pensarn and Llandanwg before reaching Harlech. Tygwyn, Talsarnau and Llandecwyn stations are the last before the line exits the park as it crosses the Dwyryd estuary via Pont Briwet and turns westwards bound for Pwllheli via Penrhyndeudraeth, Porthmadog and Criccieth.

Many sections of dismantled railway are now used by walking and cycling routes and are described elsewhere. The Bala Lake Railway is a heritage railway which has been established along a section of the former mainline route between Bala and Llanuwchllyn. Other heritage railways occupy sections of former mineral lines, often narrow gauge and are described in a separate section.

==== Buses ====
The national park is served by a growing bus network, branded Sherpa'r Wyddfa (formerly Snowdon Sherpa). The network was relaunched in July 2022 with this new brand to reflect the national park's promotion of Welsh place names. Thus the publicity and websites for the newly branded service only use these Welsh names, even though the publicity is also directed at monoglot English speakers.

Together with the TrawsCymru network of buses, this provides a car-free option for tourists and locals wishing to travel across the national park.

== History ==
The earliest evidence for human settlement of the area dates from around 4000–3000 BCE with extensive traces of prehistoric field systems evident in the landscape. Within these are traces of irregular enclosures and hut circles. There are burial chambers of Neolithic and Bronze Age such as Bryn Cader Faner and Iron Age hillforts such as Bryn y Castell near Ffestiniog.

The region was finally conquered by the Romans by AD 77–78. Remains of Roman marching and practice camps are evident. There was a Roman fort and amphitheatre at Tomen y Mur. Roads are known to have connected with Segontium (Caernarfon) and Deva Victrix (Chester) and include the northern reaches of Sarn Helen.

There are numerous memorial stones of Early Christian affinity dating from the post-Roman period. The post-Roman hillfort of Dinas Emrys also dates to this time. Churches were introduced to the region in the 5th and 6th centuries. Llywelyn the Great and Llywelyn ap Gruffudd had various stone castles constructed to protect their borders and trade routes. Edward I built several castles around the margins including those at Harlech and Conwy for military and administrative reasons. Most are now protected within a World Heritage Site. Some of Snowdonia's many stone walls date back to this period too. In the Middle Ages, the title Prince of Wales and Lord of Snowdonia (Tywysog Cymru ac Arglwydd Eryri) was used by Llywelyn ap Gruffudd; his grandfather Llywelyn Fawr used the title Prince of north Wales and Lord of Snowdonia.

The 18th century saw the start of industrial exploitation of the area's resources, assisted by the appearance in the late part of the century of turnpike trusts making it more accessible. The engineer Thomas Telford left a legacy of road and railway construction in and around Snowdonia. A new harbour at Porthmadog linked to slate quarries at Ffestiniog via a narrow gauge railway. At its peak in the 19th century, the slate industry employed around 12,000 men. A further 1000 were employed in stone quarrying at Graiglwyd and Penmaenmawr. Mining for copper, iron and gold was undertaken during the 18th and 19th centuries, leaving a legacy of mine and mill ruins today. Ruins of the gold industry are found at Cefn Coch on the Dolmelynllyn estate.

The Snowdonia Society is a registered charity formed in 1967; it is a voluntary group of people with an interest in the area and its protection.

In 1972, one of the two names Caernarvon Borough Council suggested, for the unnamed third district of Gwynedd, was "Eryri". Its other proposed name would later be chosen as the district of Arfon.

Amory Lovins led the successful 1970s opposition to stop Rio Tinto digging up the area for a massive mine.

== Natural history ==
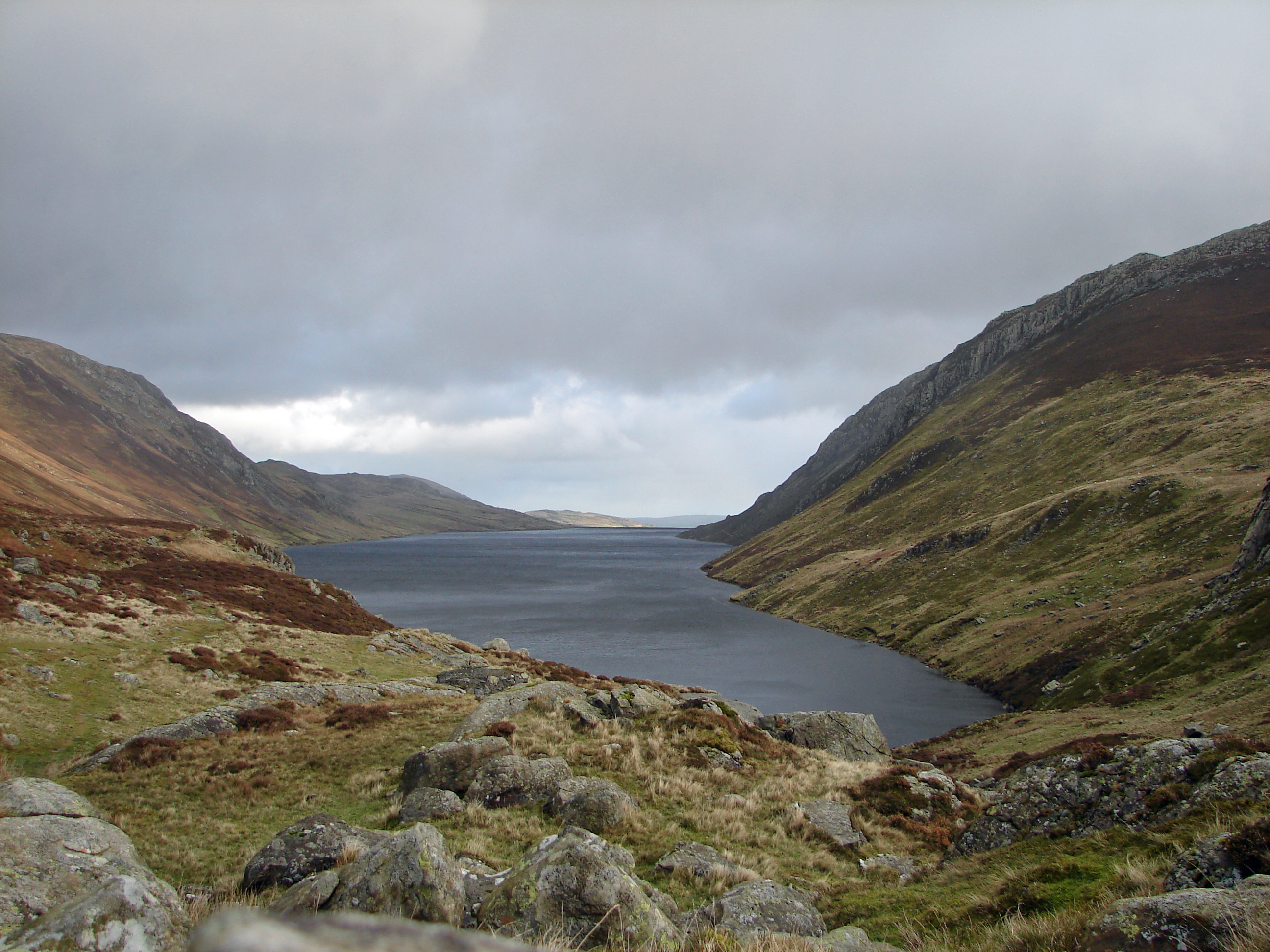
Rain coming in over Llyn Cowlyd north of Capel Curig

The park's entire coastline is a Special Area of Conservation, which runs from the Llŷn Peninsula down the mid-Wales coast, the latter containing valuable sand dune systems.

The park's natural forests are of the mixed deciduous type, the commonest tree being the Welsh oak. Birch, ash, mountain-ash and hazel are also common. The park also contains some large (planted) coniferous forested areas such as Gwydir Forest near Betws-y-Coed, although some areas, once harvested, are now increasingly being allowed to regrow naturally.

=== Flora ===
Northern Snowdonia is the only place in Britain where the Snowdon lily (Gagea serotina), an arctic–alpine plant, is found and the only place in the world where the Snowdonia hawkweed Hieracium snowdoniense grows.

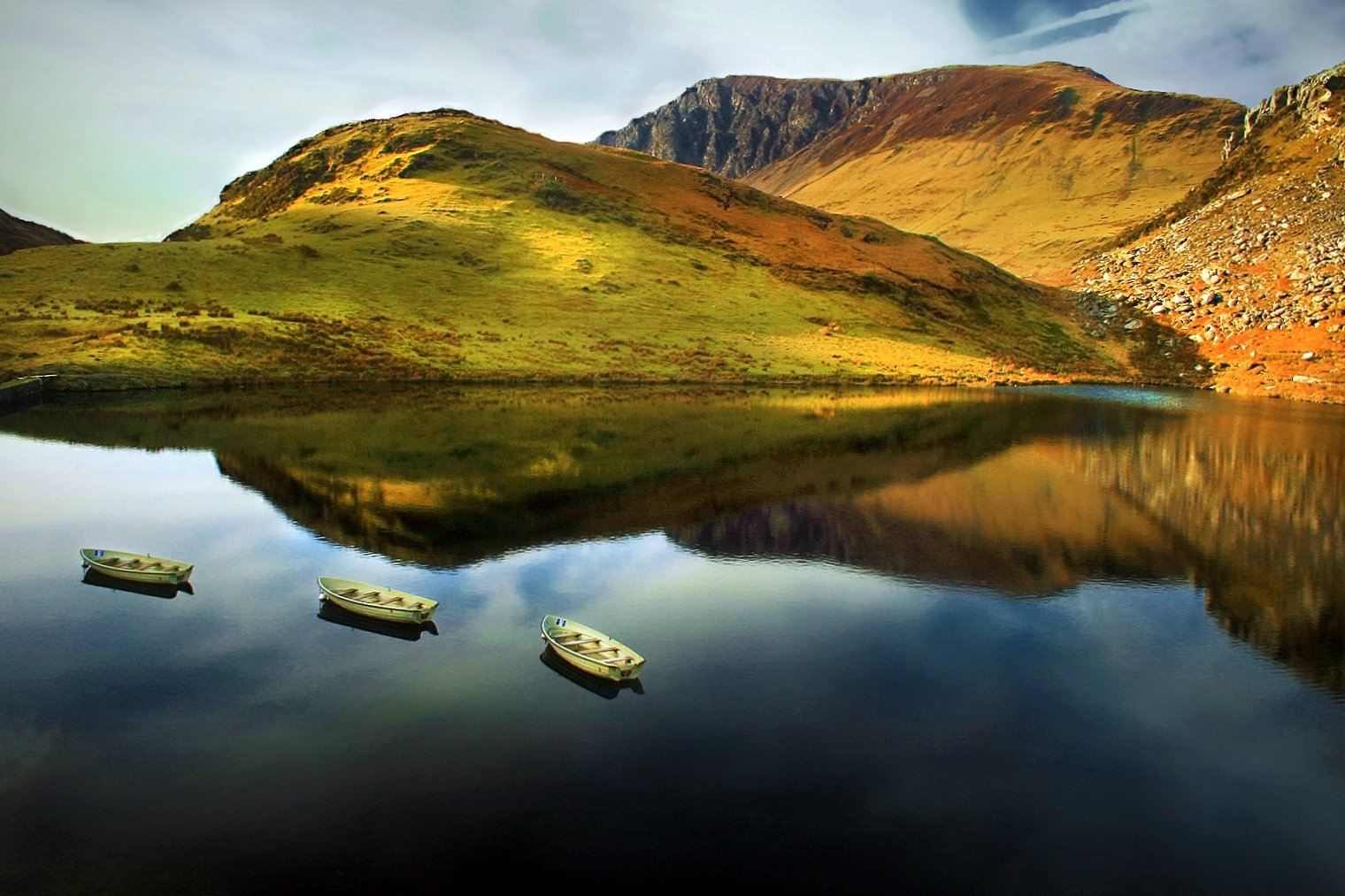
Llyn y Dywarchen, near Rhyd Ddu

One of the major problems facing the park in recent years has been the growth of Rhododendron ponticum. This fast-growing invasive species has a tendency to take over and stifle native species. It can form massive towering growths and has a companion fungus that grows on its roots producing toxins that are poisonous to any local flora and fauna for a seven-year period after the Rhododendron infestations have been eradicated. As a result, there are a number of desolate landscapes.

=== Fauna ===
Mammals in the park include otters, polecats, feral goats, and pine martens. Birds include raven, red-billed chough, peregrine, osprey, merlin and the red kite. The rainbow-coloured Snowdon beetle (Chrysolina cerealis) is only found in northern Snowdonia.

The feral goats found in Snowdonia are adapted to the rough and steep terrain. Thought to be descended from domesticated herds of goats, which were brought to the area by Neolithic farmers approximately 5,000 years ago. The goats are said to have become feral after being left and abandoned by farmers and now live in small herds. One herd that reside above Llanberis consists of more than 50 goats as of 2003, despite a cull in 2006 to control their population.

=== Conservation designations ===
Snowdonia has a particularly high number of protected sites in respect of its diverse ecology; nearly 20% of its total area is protected by UK and European law. Half of that area was set aside by the government under the European Habitats Directive as a Special Area of Conservation. There are a large number of Sites of special scientific interest (or 'SSSIs'), designated both for fauna and flora but also in some cases for geology. Nineteen of these sites are managed as national nature reserves by Natural Resources Wales. The park also contains twelve Special Areas of Conservation (or 'SACs'), three Special Protection Areas (or 'SPAs') and three Ramsar sites. Some are wholly within the park boundaries, others straddle it to various degrees.

==== Sites of Special Scientific Interest ====
There are numerous SSSIs within the park, the most extensive of which are Snowdonia, Migneint-Arenig-Dduallt, Morfa Harlech, Rhinog, Berwyn, Cadair Idris, Llyn Tegid, Aber Mawddach / Mawddach Estuary, Dyfi, Morfa Dyffryn, Moel Hebog, Coedydd Dyffryn Ffestiniog and Coedydd Nanmor.

==== National nature reserves ====
The following NNRs are either wholly or partly within the park: Allt y Benglog, Y Berwyn (in multiple parts), Cader Idris, Ceunant Llennyrch, Coed Camlyn, Coed Cymerau, Coed Dolgarrog, Coed Ganllwyd, Coed Gorswen, Coed Tremadog, Coedydd Aber, Coedydd Maentwrog (in 2 parts), Coed y Rhygen, Cwm Glas Crafnant, Cwm Idwal, Hafod Garregog, Morfa Harlech, Rhinog and Snowdon.

==== Special Areas of Conservation ====
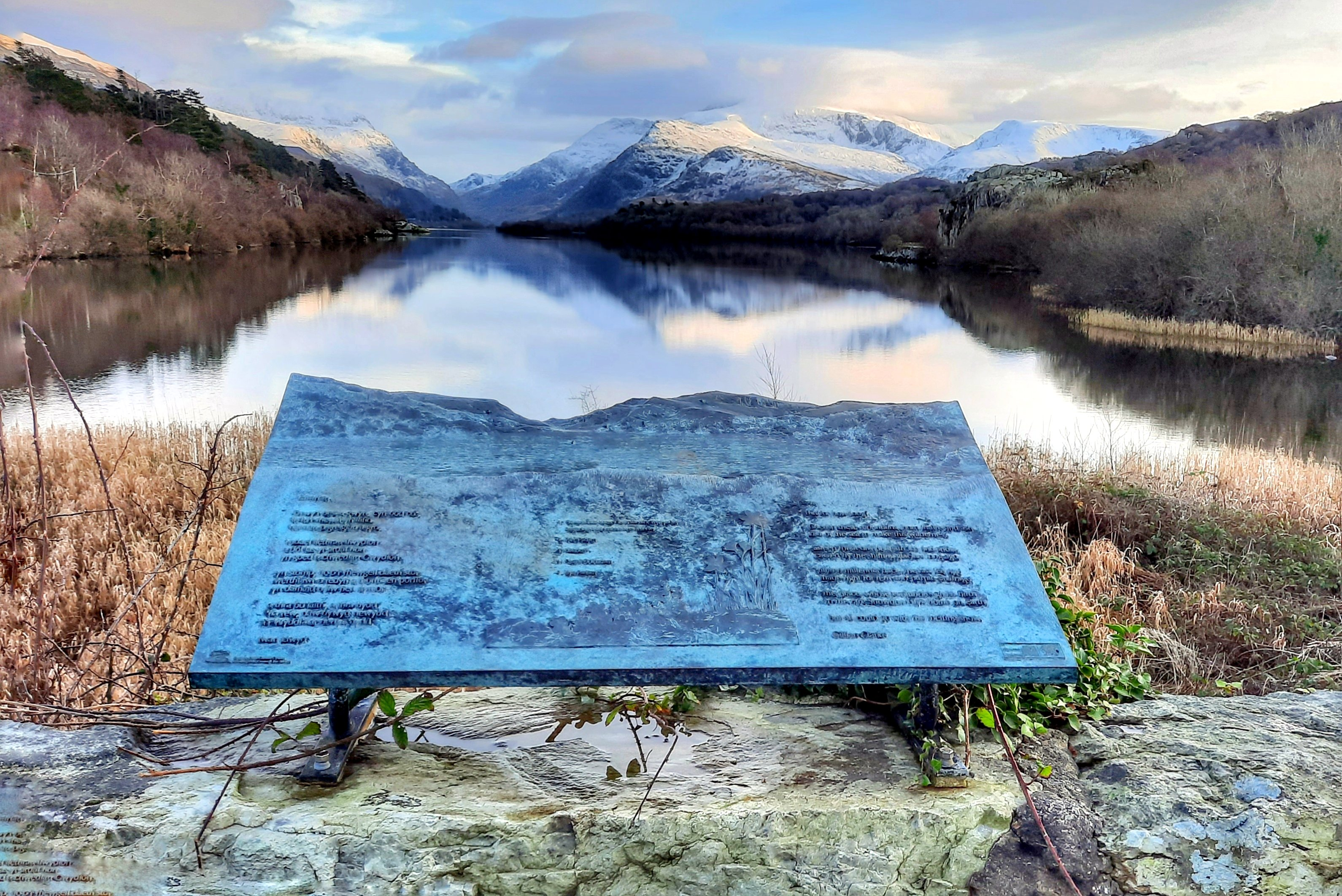
Eryri mountains reflection

The twelve SACs are as follows:

- Afon Eden – Cors Goch Trawsfynydd
- Afon Gwyrfai a (and) Llyn Cwellyn
- Part of the Berwyn a Mynyddoedd De Clwyd / Berwyn and South Clwyd Mountains SAC.
- Cadair Idris (in two parts)
- Coedydd Derw a Safleoedd Ystlumod Meirion / Meirionydd Oakwoods and Bat Sites: a series of sites between Tremadog, Trawsfynydd, and Ffestiniog and Beddgelert and extending up the Gwynant. It also includes many of the oakwoods of the Mawddach and its tributaries.
- Corsydd Eifionydd (Eifionydd Fens) (north of Garndolbenmaen)
- Eryri/Snowdonia, which covers much of the Carneddau, Glyderau, and the Snowdon massif
- Migneint-Arenig-Dduallt
- Mwyngloddiau Fforest Gwydir / Gwydyr Forest Mines (north of Betws-y-Coed)
- The Pen Llyn a'r Sarnau / Lleyn Peninsula and the Sarnau SAC covers the entire Cardigan Bay coastline of the park and the sea area and extends above the high water mark at Morfa Harlech, Mochras and around the Dovey and Mawddach estuaries.
- Rhinog
- River Dee and Bala Lake / Afon Dyfrdwy a Llyn Tegid

==== Special Protection Areas ====
The three SPAs are Dovey Estuary / Aber Dyfi (of which a part is within the park), Berwyn (of which a part is within the park) and Migneint-Arenig-Dduallt.

==== Ramsar sites ====
The three designated Ramsar sites are the Dyfi Biosphere (Cors Fochno and Dyfi), Cwm Idwal and Llyn Tegid (Bala Lake).

== Economy ==
The area's economy was traditionally centred upon farming and from the early 19th century increasingly on mining and quarrying. Tourism has become an increasingly significant part of Snowdonia's economy during the 20th and 21st centuries.

=== Hill farming ===
The extensive farming of sheep remains central to Snowdonia's farming economy.

=== Forestry ===
Significant sections of the park were afforested during the 20th century for timber production. Major conifer plantations include Dyfi Forest, Coed y Brenin Forest between Dolgellau and Trawsfynydd, Penllyn Forest south of Bala, Beddgelert Forest and Gwydyr (or Gwydir) Forest near Betws-y-Coed which is managed as a forest park by Natural Resources Wales.

=== Slate industry ===
The region was once the most important producer of slate in the world. Some production continues but at a much reduced level from its peak. The park boundaries are drawn such that much of the landscape affected by slate quarrying and mining lies immediately outside of the designated area.

=== Energy production ===
Construction of a nuclear power station beside Llyn Trawsfynydd began in 1959 with the first power produced in 1965. The site was operational until 1991 though it continues as an employer during its decommissioning phase. Pumped storage hydroelectric schemes are in operation at Llanberis and Ffestiniog.

=== Tourism ===
Research indicates that there were 3.67 million visitors to Snowdonia National Park in 2013, with approximately 9.74 million tourist days spent in the park during that year. Total tourist expenditure was £433.6 million in 2013.

==== Hiking ====
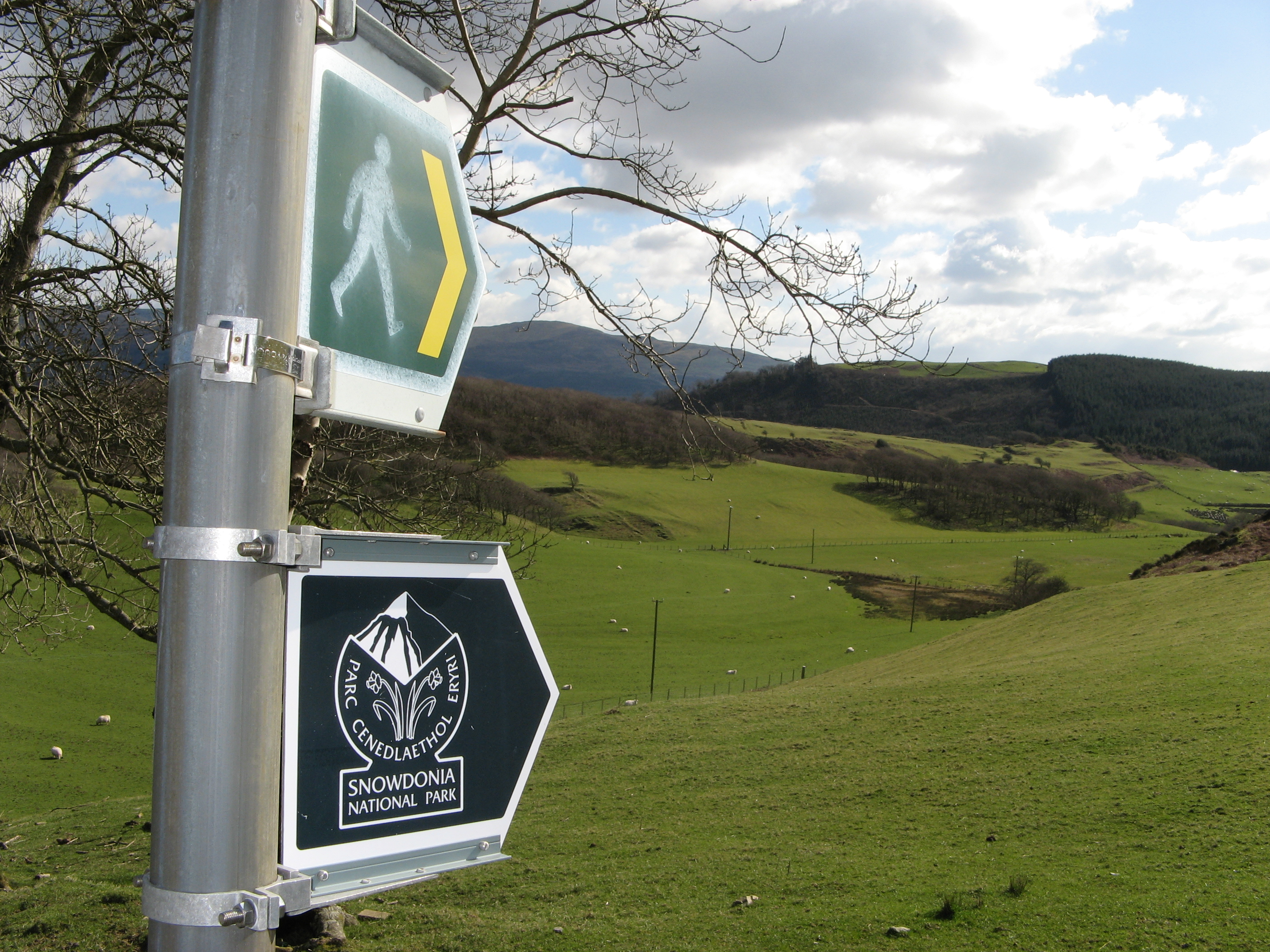
Southern edge. Waymarked path near Llyn Barfog in Gwynedd

Many of the hikers in the area concentrate on Snowdon itself. It is regarded as a fine mountain, but at times gets very crowded; in addition the Snowdon Mountain Railway runs to the summit.

The other high mountains with their boulder-strewn summits as well as Tryfan, one of the few mountains in the UK south of Scotland whose ascent needs hands as well as feet are also very popular. However, there are also some spectacular walks in Snowdonia on the lower mountains, and they tend to be relatively unfrequented. Among hikers' favourites are Y Garn (east of Llanberis) along the ridge to Elidir Fawr; Mynydd Tal-y-Mignedd (west of Snowdon) along the Nantlle Ridge to Mynydd Drws-y-Coed; Moelwyn Mawr (west of Blaenau Ffestiniog); and Pen Llithrig y Wrach north of Capel Curig. Further south are Y Llethr in the Rhinogydd, and Cadair Idris near Dolgellau.

The park has 1,479 miles (2,380 km) of public footpaths, 164 miles (264 km) of public bridleways, and 46 miles (74 km) of other public rights of way. A large part of the park is also covered by right to roam laws.

==== Recreational routes ====
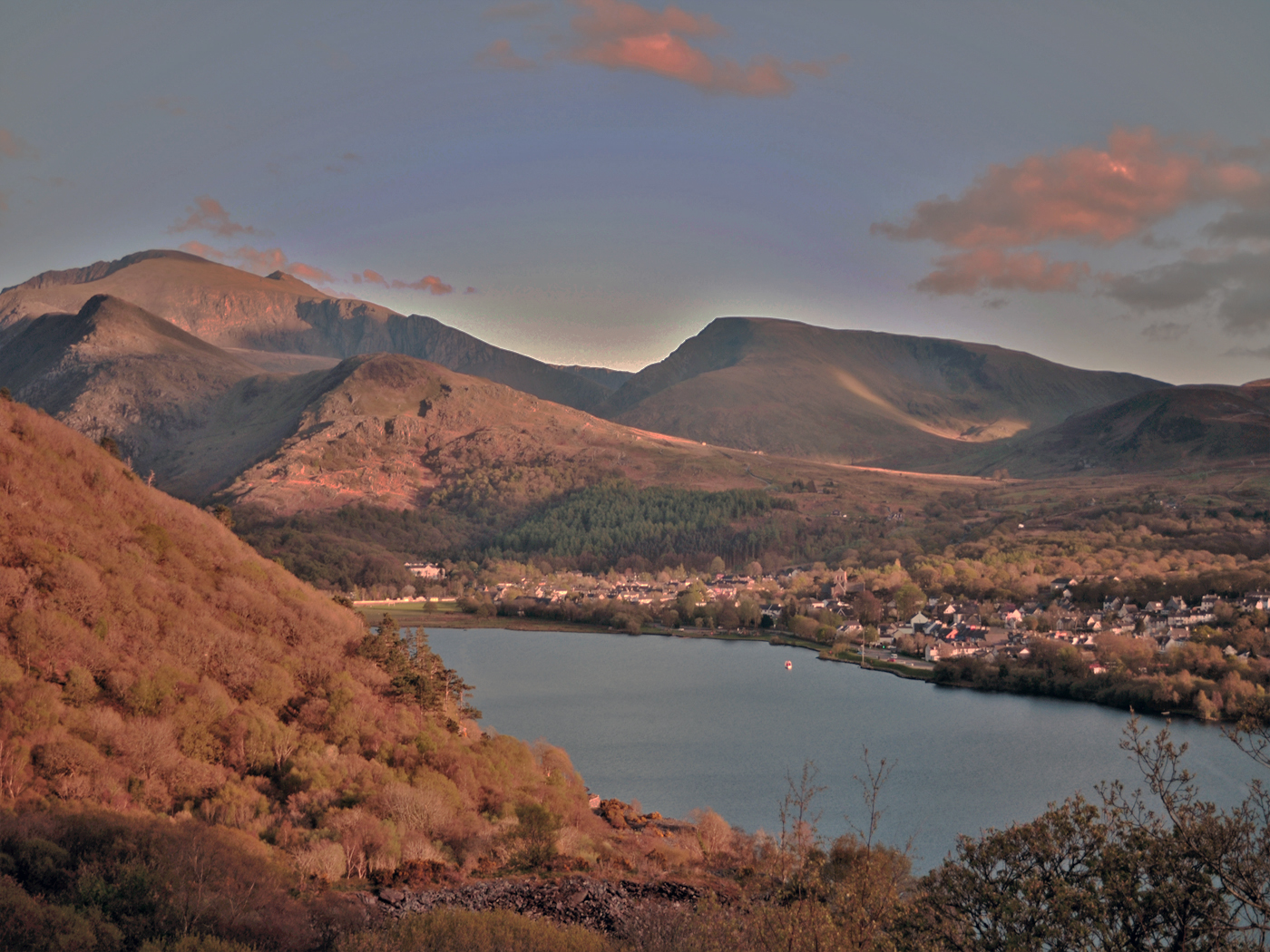
Sunset over Snowdonia & Padarn country park

The Wales Coast Path runs within the park between Machynlleth and Penrhyndeudraeth, save for short sections of coast in the vicinity of Tywyn and Barmouth which are excluded from the park. It touches the park boundary again at Penmaen-bach Point on the north coast. An inland alternative exists between Llanfairfechan and Conwy, wholly within the park. The North Wales Path, which predates the WCP, enters the park north of Bethesda and follows a route broadly parallel to the north coast visiting Aber Falls and the Sychnant Pass before exiting the park on the descent from Conwy Mountain. The Cambrian Way is a long-distance trail between Cardiff and Conwy that stays almost entirely within the national park from Mallwyd northwards. It was officially recognised in 2019, and is now depicted on Ordnance Survey maps.

== Use of Eryri in English ==
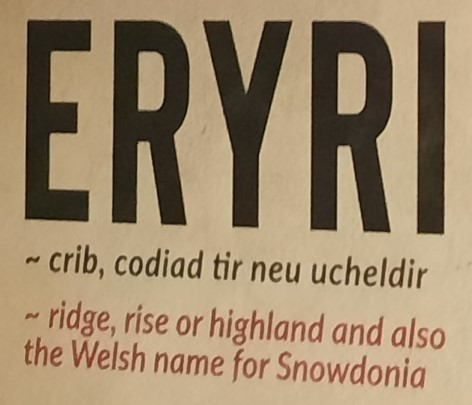
A sign in Hafod Eryri, Snowdon's summit building, giving the meaning of the name Eryri

There have been calls to use the Welsh name for the area, Eryri, in preference to "Snowdonia" in English-language contexts. In 2003, the pressure group Cymuned campaigned for such a change, inspired by other campaigns such as Ayers Rock being known as Uluru and Mount Everest as Qomolangma. In 2020, an e-petition calling for the removal of the English name was put forward to the Senedd, but rejected as responsibility lies with the Snowdonia National Park Authority. In 2021, an e-petition on the same topic attracted more than 5,300 signatures and was presented to the national park authority. The authority was already considering its language policy, but stated that the petition encouraged it to take "decisive action", and it resolved to use Welsh names as far as legally possible in November 2022; it must continue to use "Snowdonia" in statutory documents. Before the decision, the authority had already prioritised the Welsh names by using them first and giving the English names in brackets. The naming policy applies only to the national park authority.

In November 2024, the authority stated that the name change had been a "success" as many businesses and media had followed suit. The authority stated that a summer survey showed "strong support" from locals and visitors for the name change. While some concerns were raised over misconceptions by some that the Welsh names were new and mispronunciations, the authority stated that the change resulted in the park being more associated with a Welsh identity, and more different from other UK national parks. The authority is set to make a pronunciation guide and update its logo which still contains Snowdonia. Two days later the authority revealed the new logo that removed the name "Snowdonia".
