= River Artro =

River in Gwynedd, Wales

Coordinates: 52°51.7′N 4°1.6′W

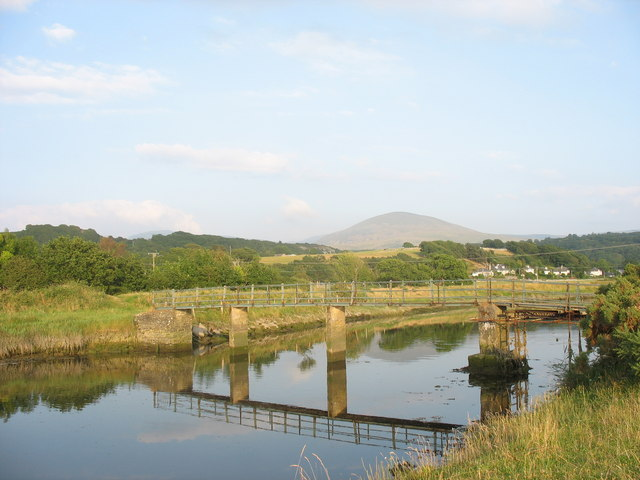
- Footbridge over the lower Artro
- Native name: Afon Artro (Welsh)

Location
- Country: Wales

Physical characteristics
- Source: Llyn Cwm Bychan
- Length: 4.5 mi (7.2 km)

The River Artro (Welsh: Afon Artro) is a river in Gwynedd, Wales.

It is about 4.5 miles (7.2 km) long and has its source at Llyn Cwm Bychan below Rhinog Fawr and Moel Ysgyfarnogod. It flows westwards from its source and is joined by the Afon Cwmnantcol at Pentre Gwynfryn before passing through the centre of Llanbedr where it turns north and passes Pensarn Wharf.

The Artro enters the sea at a sizeable tidal estuary between Llandanwg and Mochras/Shell Island. The current estuary was formed following a diversion of the Artro by the Earl of Winchilsea in 1819 to improve access to the wharf at Pensarn which was the shipment point for slate from Llanfair and Llanbedr. Prior to this the Artro entered the sea to the south of Mochras.
