= Llandanwg =

Village in Wales

Coordinates: 52.835°N 4.124°W

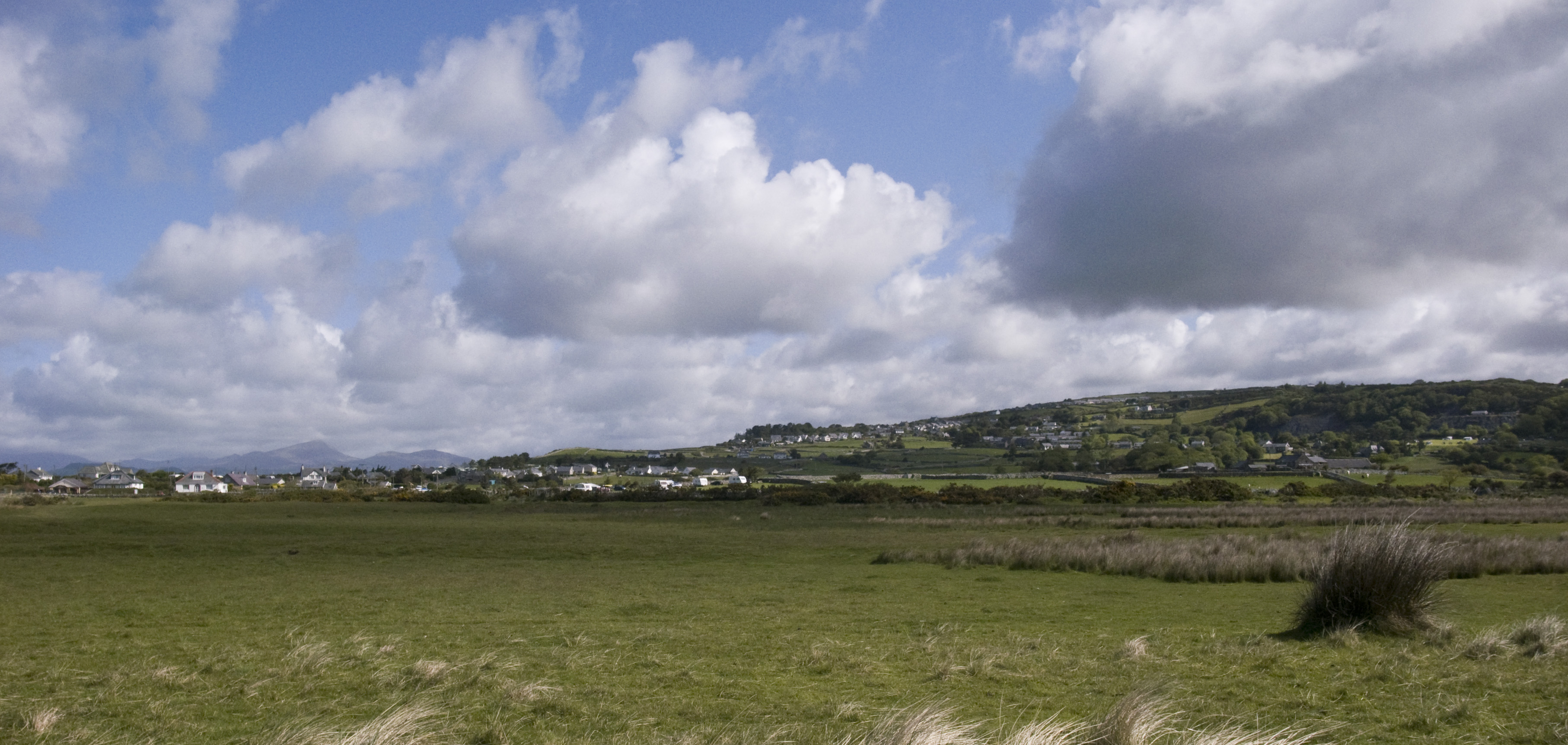
- Llandanwg (left) and Llanfair (right, on the hill)

- Location within Gwynedd
- OS grid reference: SH570285
- Community: Llanfair
- Principal area: Gwynedd
- Preserved county: Gwynedd
- Country: Wales
- Sovereign state: United Kingdom
- Post town: HARLECH
- Postcode district: LL46
- Dialling code: 01341
- Police: North Wales
- Fire: North Wales
- Ambulance: Welsh
- UK Parliament: Dwyfor Meirionnydd
- Senedd Cymru – Welsh Parliament: Dwyfor Meirionnydd

Llandanwg (Welsh pronunciation) is a village in the Llanfair community of the Ardudwy area of Gwynedd, Wales. Situated on the coast, it has a railway station and a Grade II listed medieval church.

== The village ==
Llandanwg is situated to the west of the A496 coastal road between Llanbedr and Harlech, close to the village of Llanfair and about two miles south of Harlech. Originally it was a small collection of farms to the north of the river Artro, close to where it enters the sea. Later developments expanded the size of the village.

The village has a railway station, Llandanwg Halt, where trains on the Cambrian Line stop on request. A new evening train service was introduced in 2015, which angered local residents when it was found that it would not stop at Llandanwg and some other halts. This has since been reversed.

There is an easily accessible, shelving beach at the end of the road through the village. It is part of Snowdonia National Park. Nearby is Mochras or Shell Island, accessible by a causeway but only at low tide. The Llandanwg Holiday Home Park provides static holiday homes on a hillside above the village, with views over Tremadog Bay. Morlyn guesthouse which used to be the village shop offers both bed and breakfast and self-catering accommodation overlooking the estuary and the Llanbedr space centre.

== Church of Saint Tanwg ==
The parish church of Saint Tanwg is situated just behind the beach in the sand dunes just 20 metres (66 ft) above the high tide mark. The church is mediaeval, probably dating from the 13th century, but there are three 5th to 6th century inscribed stones and two stones with inscribed crosses inside the building, indicating much earlier activity; it has probably been a place of worship since the Age of the Saints, possibly as early as the first part of the 5th century. Much of the churchyard – which contains the war graves of a Royal Welsh Fusiliers soldier and Royal Garrison Artillery officer of World War I – is buried in sand. The church is a Grade II listed building.

== Gallery ==
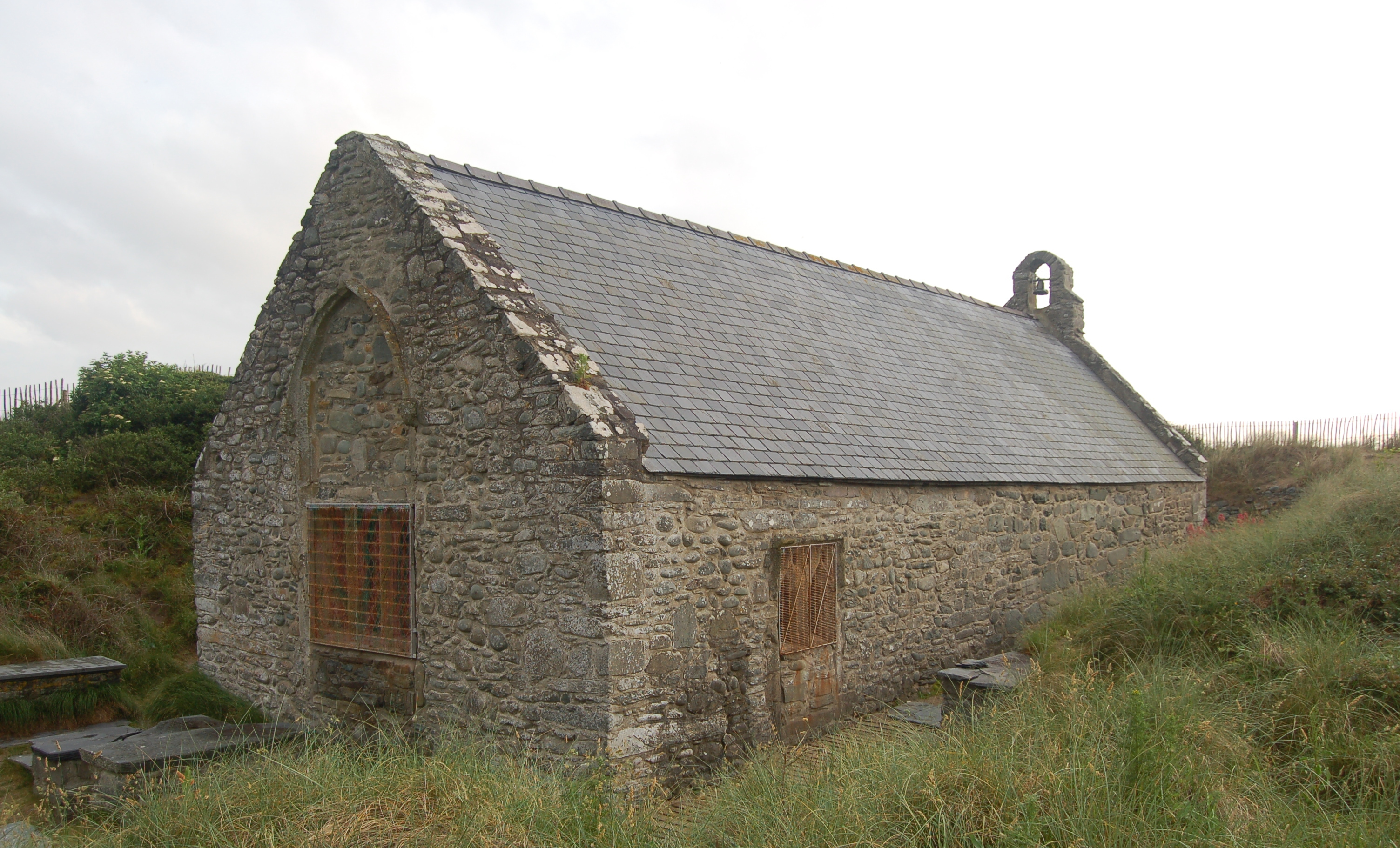
Llandanwg church from the churchyard

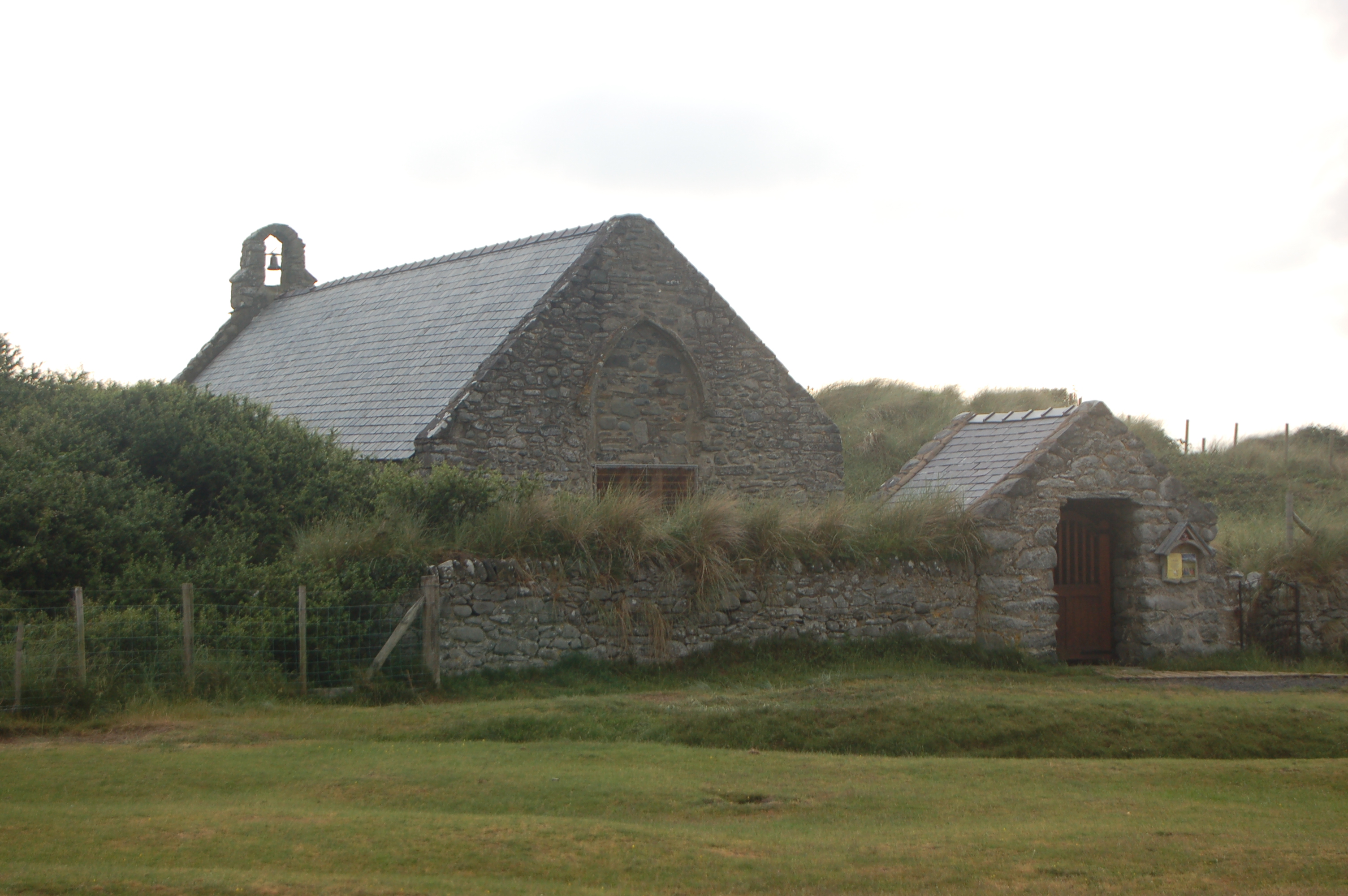
Llandanwg church from Y Maes

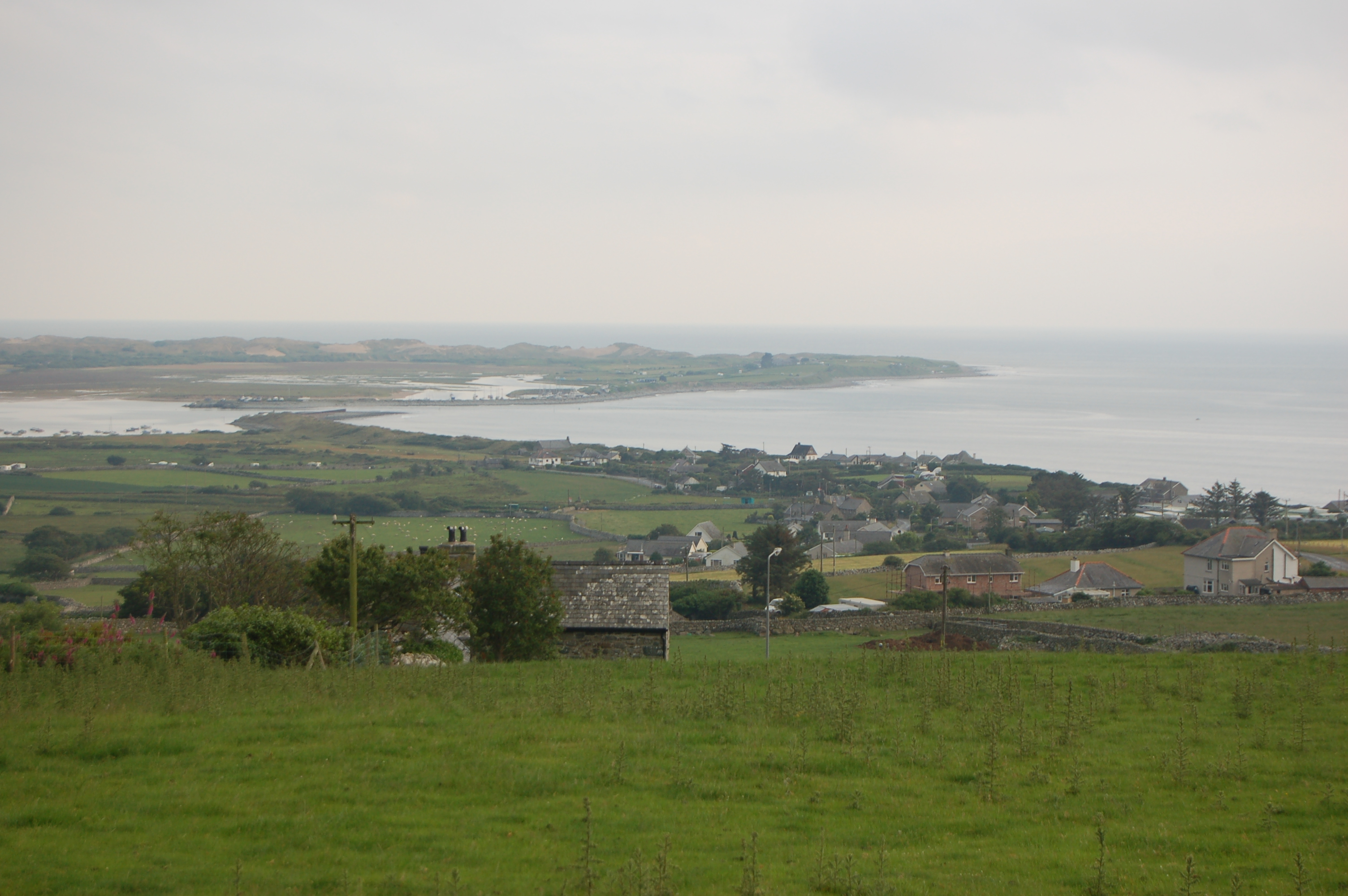
Llandanwg viewed from above the main road with Mochras (Shell Island) in the background

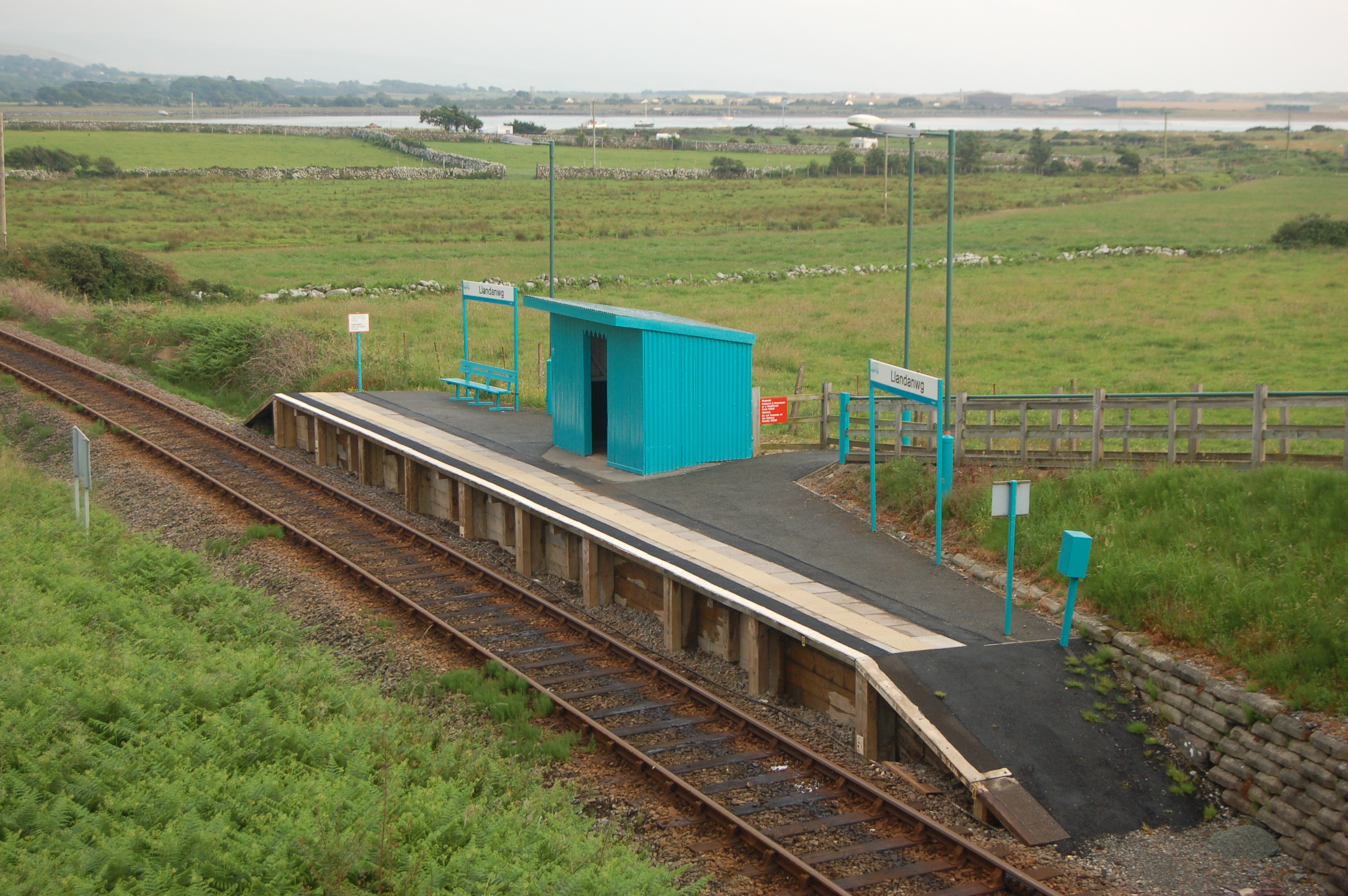
Llandanwg Halt, a design typical of the Cambrian Line. The Great Western opened many such halts between 1923 and 1935 along this line similar to this one.

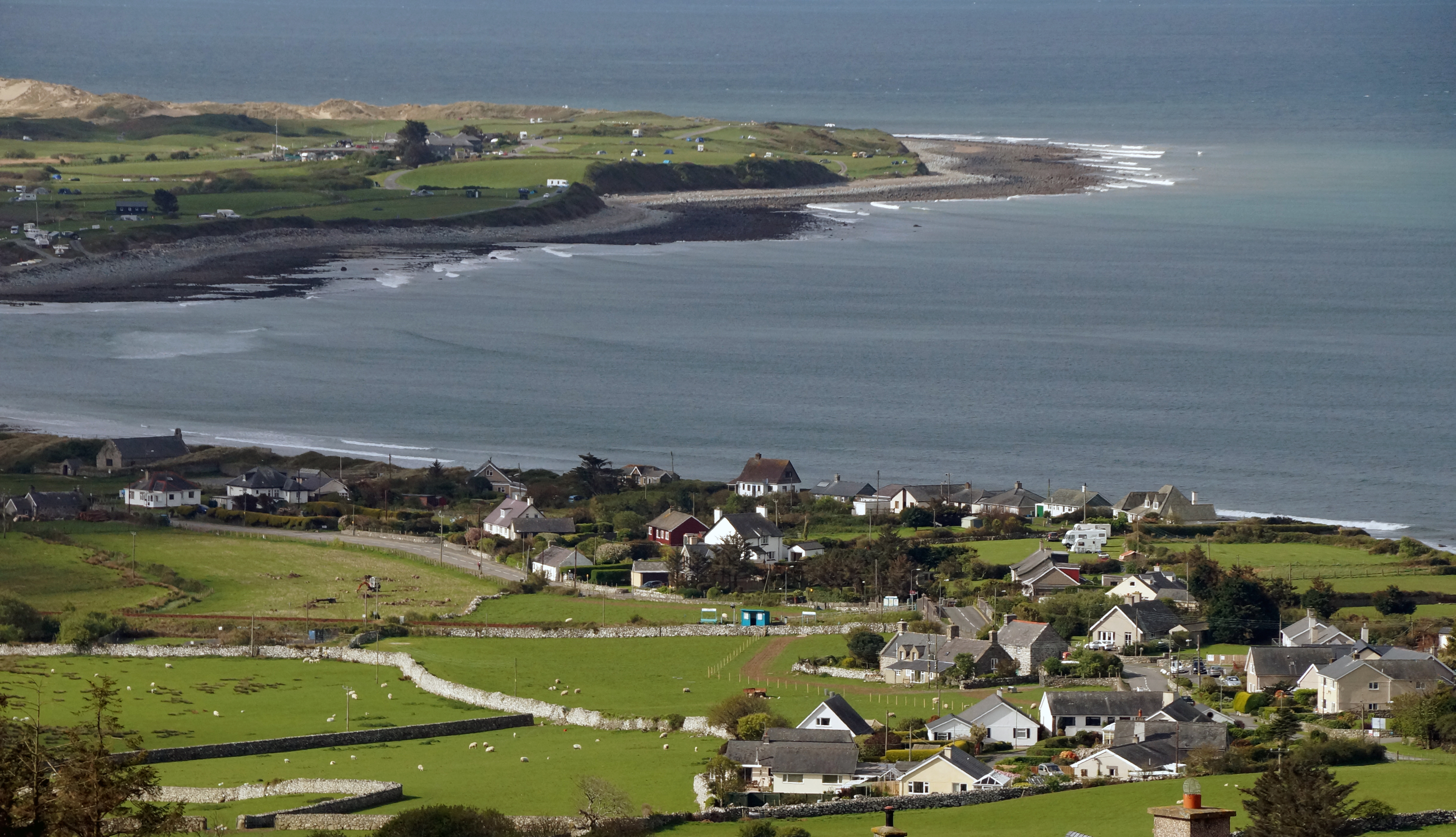
Llandanwg and Shell Island from the north
