= Mochras =

Coordinates: 52.81665°N 4.14997°W

Mochras: Shell Island
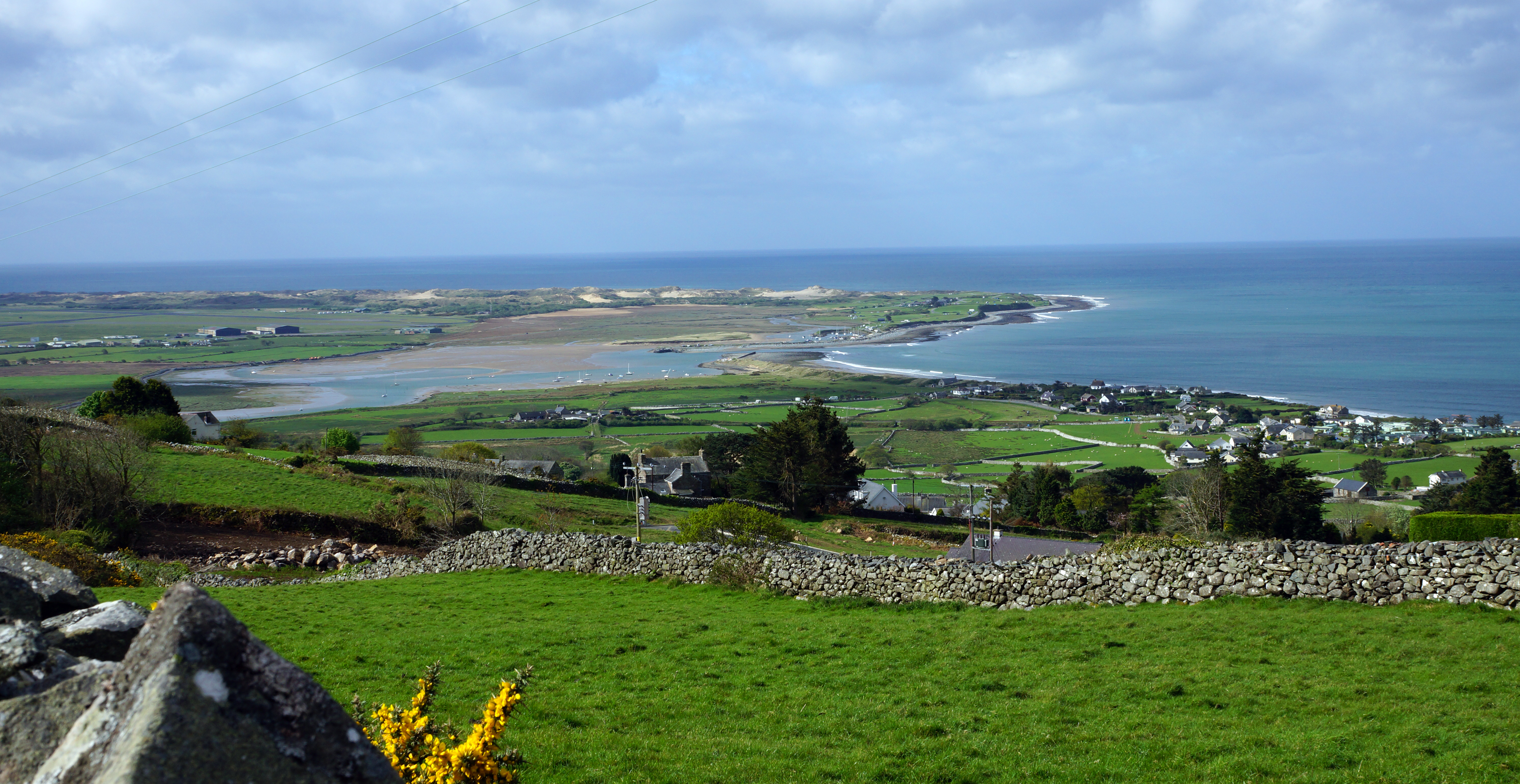
- Mochras above Llandanwg village

- Location within Gwynedd
- OS grid reference: SH552265
- Principal area: Gwynedd
- Preserved county: Gwynedd
- Country: Wales
- Sovereign state: United Kingdom
- Post town: LLANBEDR
- Postcode district: LL45
- Dialling code: 01341
- Police: North Wales
- Fire: North Wales
- Ambulance: Welsh

Mochras, also known in English as Shell Island, is a peninsula lying west of Llanbedr in Gwynedd, Wales. The peninsula was formed after the River Artro was diverted by the Earl of Winchilsea in 1819 from its previous course where it entered the sea to the south of Mochras. Prior to this, access to the ancient settlement would have been through the village of Llandanwg, which is now across the estuary.

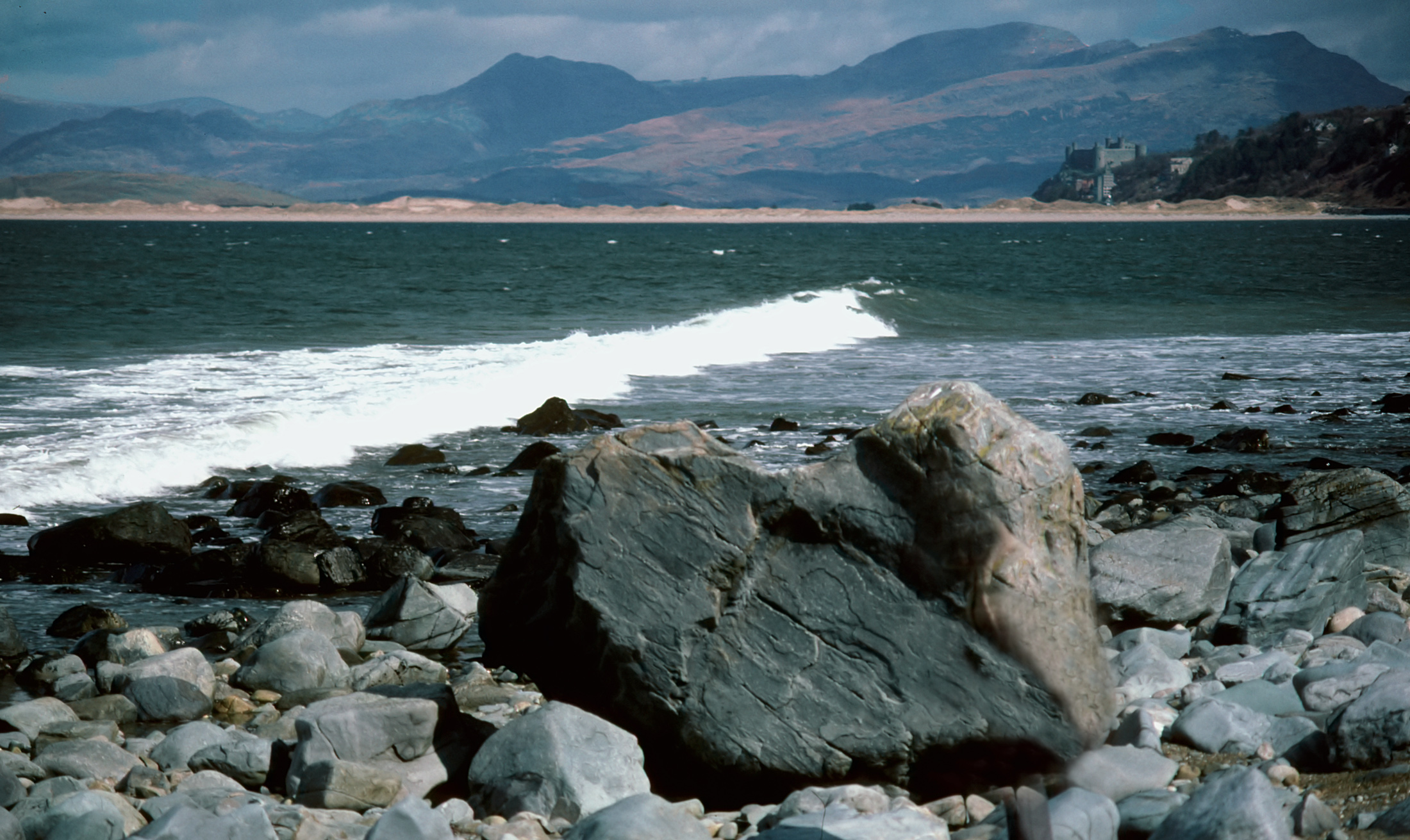
View from Mochras looking north

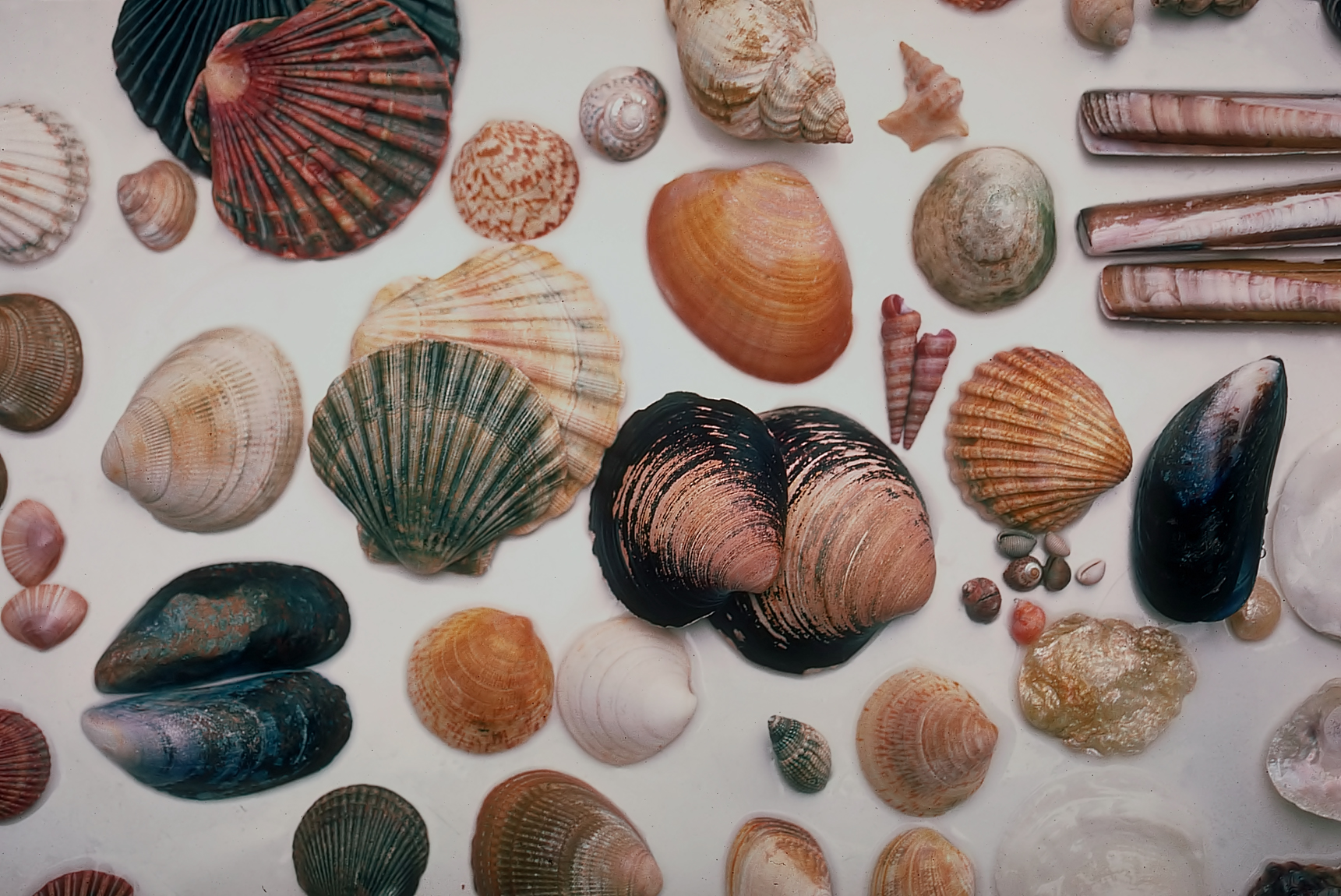
Seashells hand picked from beach drift at Mochras (marine bivalves and gastropods)

Mochras is known for the wide variety of seashells that wash up on the beach, and for its wild flowers. It is said to have been connected to the mythical Cantre'r Gwaelod.

The peninsula lies within the Snowdonia National Park. From the end of October to the following March local farmers bring their sheep from the lowlands to graze.

== Geology ==
Mochras is significant for the UK earth sciences. The area consists of a low lying raised beach (which encompasses the nearby Llanbedr Airport).

Between 1967 and 1969 the Institute of Geological Sciences (now known as the British Geological Survey) drilled a 1,938 m stratigraphic proving borehole at Mochras Farm. This found relatively young Tertiary and Mesozoic rocks (including a well-developed Upper, Middle and Lower Lias section towards the base of the Jurassic), faulted against the ancient Cambrian rocks of the Harlech dome. In 1971, the vertical throw of the fault was judged to be at least 4,500 metres (2.8 mi).

== Access ==
Public vehicular access to the peninsula is only possible via a causeway across the estuary of the River Artro when the tide is out. Access on foot is always possible from the adjacent Morfa Dyffryn beach, which extends for several kilometres south of Mochras. Access to emergency vehicles is available at any time through the neighbouring airfield.

== Amenities ==
Mochras has a popular camp site, under the name Shell Island, which offers the opportunity to practise "wild camping" in pitches which are far from the nearest neighbour (and from toilet and other facilities). Camp fires are allowed on the beach; with only raised, contained fires and barbecues allowed on the campsite.

== Notable people ==
Siôn Phylip was a noted poet and came from Mochras.

== See also ==
- Morfa Dyffryn
- Sarn Badrig
