= Dyffryn Ardudwy railway station =

Railway station in Gwynedd, Wales

Dyffryn Ardudwy
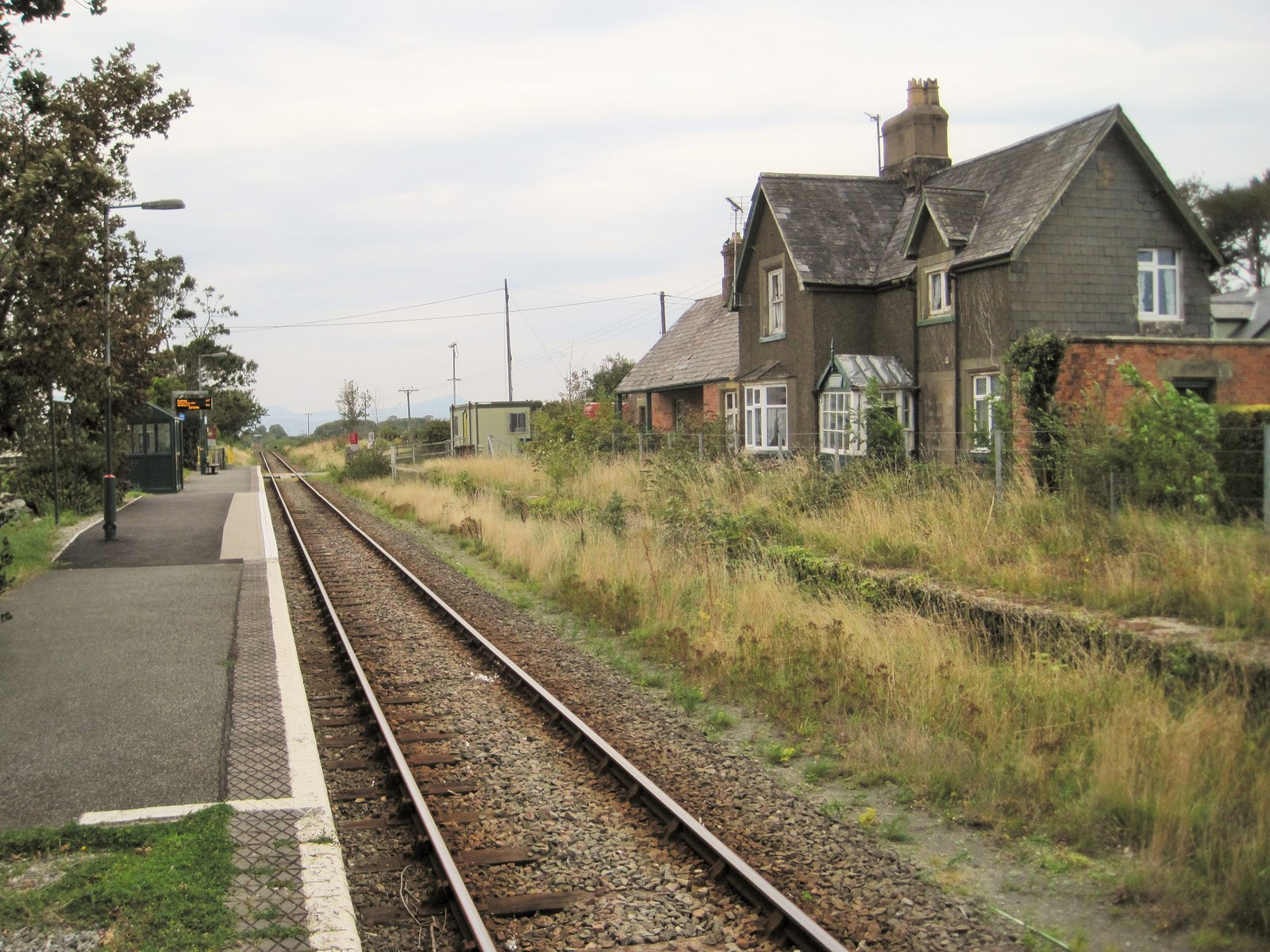

General information
- Location: Dyffryn Ardudwy, Gwynedd; Wales
- Coordinates: 52.789°N 4.105°W
- Grid reference: SH581233
- Manager: Transport for Wales
- Platforms: 1

Other information
- Station code: DYF
- Classification: DfT category F2

Passengers
- 2021/22: ▲9,172
- 2022/23: ▲15,756
- 2023/24: ▲18,728
- 2024/25: ▲21,934
- 2025/26: ▲26,420
Location
Notes
- Passenger statistics from the Office of Rail and Road

Dyffryn Ardudwy railway station serves the villages of Dyffryn Ardudwy, Coed Ystumgwern and Llanenddwyn in Gwynedd, Wales.

Dyffryn Ardudwy gives its name to the district and to the very extensive beach and sand dunes on the coast nearby that are known as Morfa Dyffryn.

== History ==
The station was opened on 10 October 1867 by the Cambrian Railway Company as Dyffryn.

The station once had two platforms and was a passing place for trains between Harlech and Barmouth. There was a goods yard to the east of the station.

On 1 July 1924 it was renamed Dyffryn-on-Sea. The station was host to a GWR camp coach from 1934 to 1939.

On 1 June 1948 was renamed to its present name. A camping coach was also positioned here by the Western Region from 1956 to 1962. In 1963 the administration of camping coaches at the station was taken over by the London Midland, there was a coach here from 1963 to 1964.

The station was destaffed when the passing loop was taken out of use in 1968. The redundant track remained in place until 1980 as did a signal that had been converted to a fixed distant. All trains now use the down platform. The station building on the up platform is today a dwelling.

In 2016, The Welsh Government funded the installation of reinforced glass fibre 'humps' on the platforms to improve access for wheelchair and pushchair users onto and off trains.

== Services ==
The station is an unstaffed halt on the Cambrian Coast Railway with passenger services to Harlech, Porthmadog, Pwllheli, Barmouth, Machynlleth, Birmingham and Shrewsbury.

| Preceding station | National Rail | Following station |
|---|---|---|
| Llanbedr | Transport for Wales Pwllheli Line | Talybont |
| | Historical railways | |
| Llanbedr; Line and station open | Cambrian Railways; Aberystwith and Welsh Coast Railway | Talybont; Line and station open |
