= Llanbedr railway station =

Railway station in Gwynedd, Wales

Llanbedr
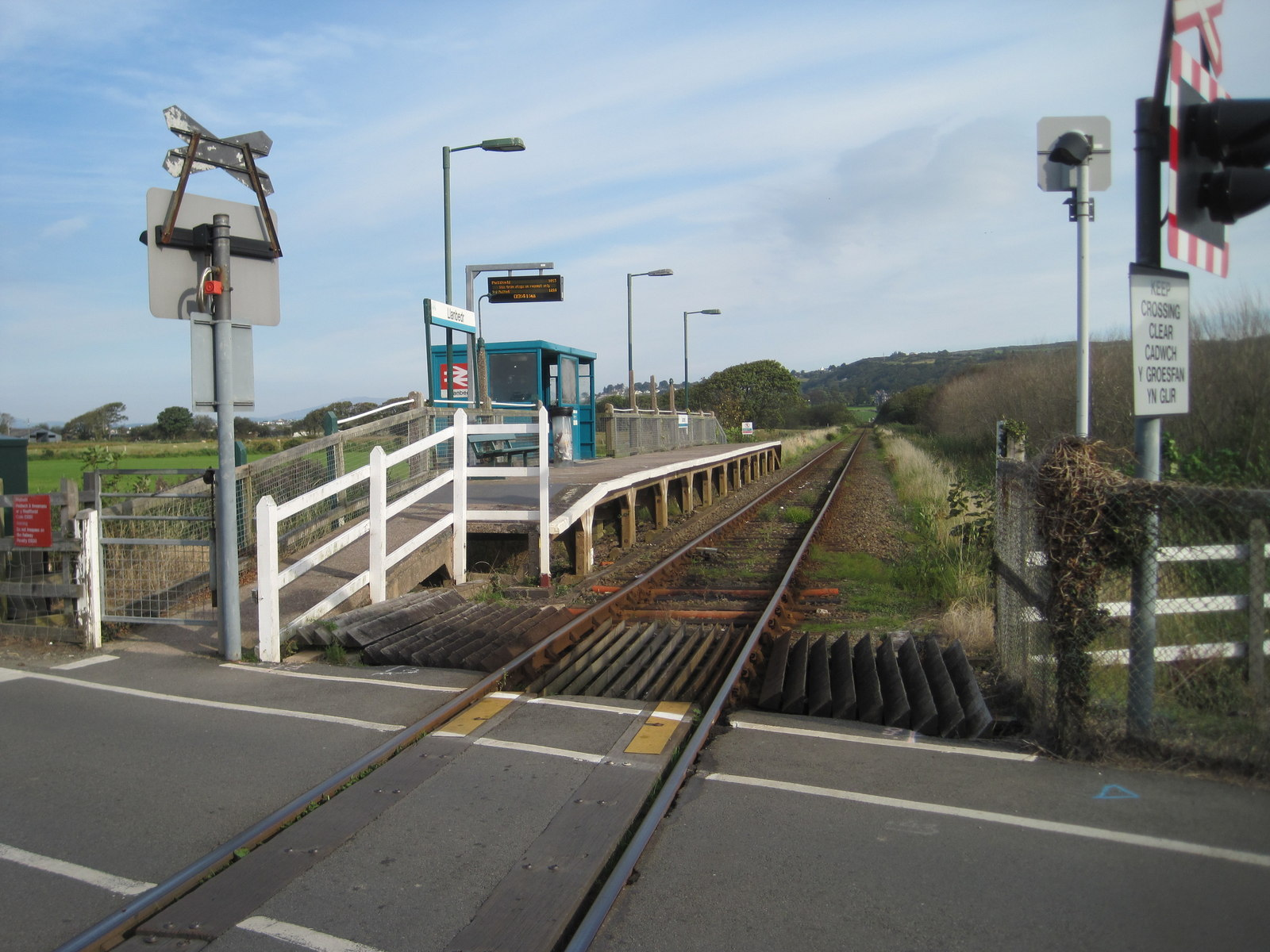

General information
- Location: Llanbedr, Gwynedd; Wales
- Coordinates: 52.821°N 4.110°W
- Grid reference: SH579268
- Manager: Transport for Wales
- Platforms: 1

Other information
- Station code: LBR
- Classification: DfT category F2

Key dates
- 9 July 1923: Opened as Talwrn Bach
- 8 May 1978: Renamed Llanbedr

Passengers
- 2021/22: ▲2,596
- 2022/23: ▲9,782
- 2023/24: ▲9,826
- 2024/25: ▲14,612
- 2025/26: ▲16,332
Location
Notes
- Passenger statistics from the Office of Rail and Road

Llanbedr railway station (formerly Talwrn Bach) serves the village of Llanbedr in Gwynedd, Wales. The station is an unstaffed halt on the Cambrian Coast Railway with passenger services to Porthmadog, Pwllheli, Barmouth, Machynlleth and Shrewsbury. The station is a request stop and close to the popular camping resort of Shell Island.

From 22 June 2020, trains did not call at the station due to the short platform and the inability to maintain social distancing between passengers and the guard when opening the train door. This meant that, in the Office of Rail and Road's statistics, it became one of Britain's least used stations, recording no passengers in the year 2020–21. However, the station has since reopened according to Transport for Wales, the train operator which provides services to and from the station.

Preceding station	National Rail	Following station
Pensarn	Transport for Wales Cambrian Coast Line	Dyffryn Ardudwy
	Historical railways	
Pensarn; Line and station open	Great Western Railway; Aberystwith and Welsh Coast Railway	Dyffryn Ardudwy; Line and station open
