= Katherine Mudge =

British archer (1881–1975)

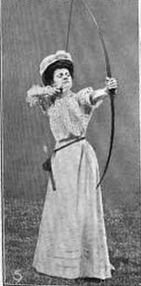

Personal information
- Birth name: Katherine Gwen Mudge
- National team: Great Britain
- Born: 16 August 1881; Llanbedr, Wales
- Died: 26 July 1975 (aged 93); Stratton, Cornwall, England
- Occupation: Archer

Katherine Gwen Mudge (16 August 1881 – 26 July 1975) was a British archer. She competed at the 1908 Summer Olympics in London. She was born in Llanbedr, Gwynedd in Wales. She was a member of the Devon and Cornwall Archery Society. Mudge competed at the 1908 Games in the only archery event open to women, the double National round. She took 17th place in the event with 465 points.

Her married name was Cardale. She died in Stratton in Cornwall on 26 July 1975.

== Sources ==
- Cook, Theodore Andrea (1908). The Fourth Olympiad, Being the Official Report. London: British Olympic Association.
- De Wael, Herman (2001). "Archery 1908". Herman's Full Olympians. Archived from the original on 29 September 2006.
