= Llandanwg railway station =

Railway station in Gwynedd, Wales

Llandanwg
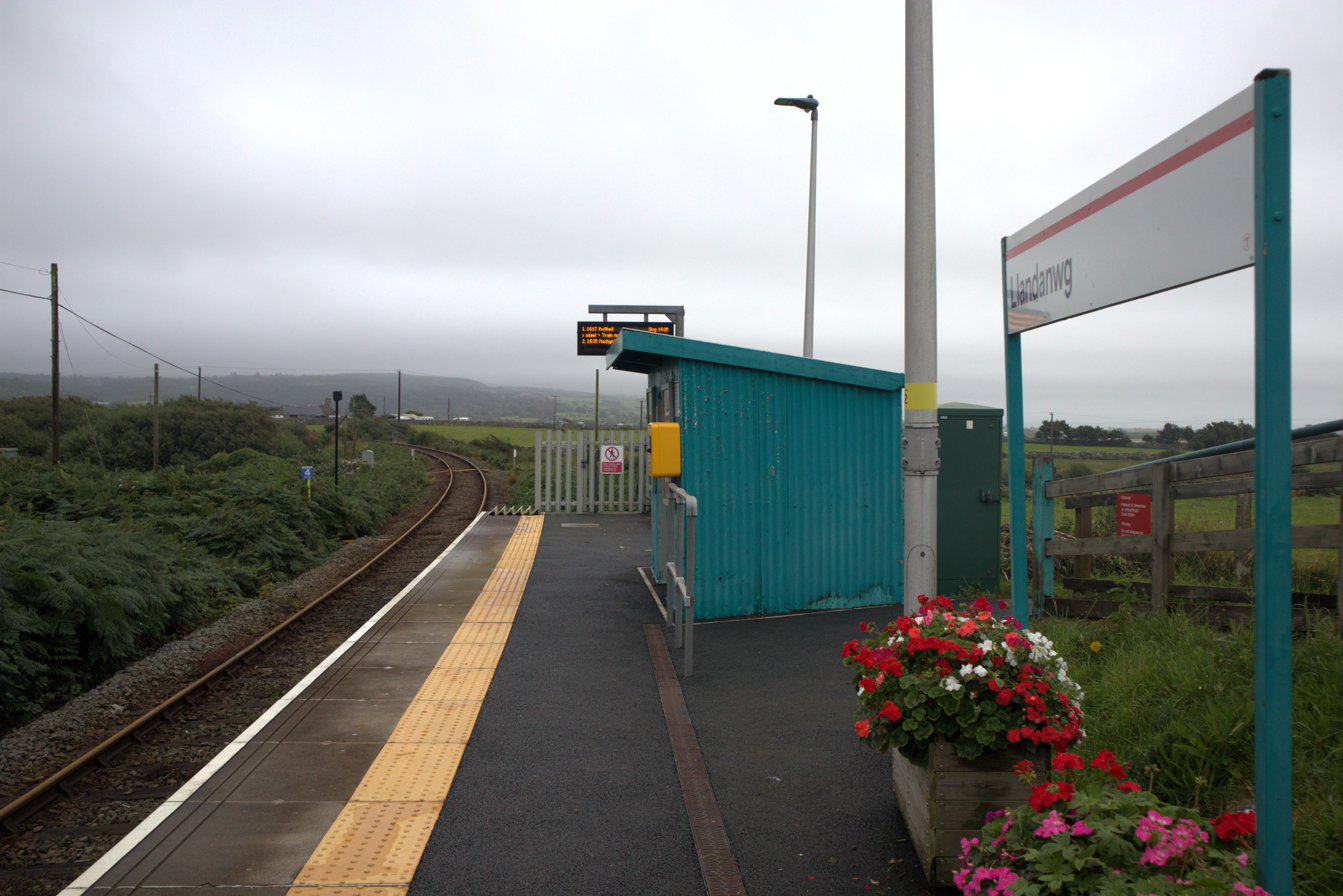
- Llandanwg station pictured in August 2024

General information
- Location: Llandanwg, Gwynedd; Wales
- Coordinates: 52.836224°N 4.123671°W
- Grid reference: SH570286
- Manager: Transport for Wales
- Platforms: 1

Other information
- Station code: LDN
- Classification: DfT category F2

History
- Opened: 8 November 1929
- Original company: Great Western Railway
- Post-grouping: Great Western Railway

Passengers
- 2021/22: ▲464
- 2022/23: ▲3,860
- 2023/24: ▲4,354
- 2024/25: ▲6,086
- 2025/26: ▲7,012
Location
Notes
- Passenger statistics from the Office of Rail and Road

Llandanwg railway station is in the village of Llandanwg in Gwynedd, Wales. It is an unstaffed halt on the Cambrian Coast Railway with direct passenger services to Harlech, Porthmadog and Pwllheli to the north and west, and Barmouth, Machynlleth, Shrewsbury and Birmingham to the south and east.

== History ==
The railway line was opened by the Cambrian Railways in 1867, but the station did not open until 1929, after the Cambrian Railways had been incorporated into the Great Western Railway.

During the Coronavirus pandemic, from 22 June 2020, trains did not call at the station due to the short platform and the inability to maintain social distancing between passengers and the guard when opening the train door. However, trains now call again at the station. The platform, once wooden in construction, has now (2023) been replaced by a modern structure. This has blunt ends, but is still very short, and the original GWR corrugated metal shelter remains. It therefore retains much of its charm as a rural halt.

== Services ==
Trains run approximately every two hours in both directions, but with significantly fewer trains on Sundays. All trains run as far as Pwllheli and Machynlleth, with some running beyond Machynlleth to Shrewsbury and Birmingham, whilst others provide onward connections there. All trains call at Llandanwg only on request.

Preceding station	National Rail	Following station
Harlech	Transport for Wales Cambrian Coast Line	Pensarn
	Historical railways	
Harlech; Line and station open	Great Western Railway; Aberystwith and Welsh Coast Railway	Llanbedr and Pensarn; Line and station open
