= Llanfair, Gwynedd =

Llanfair
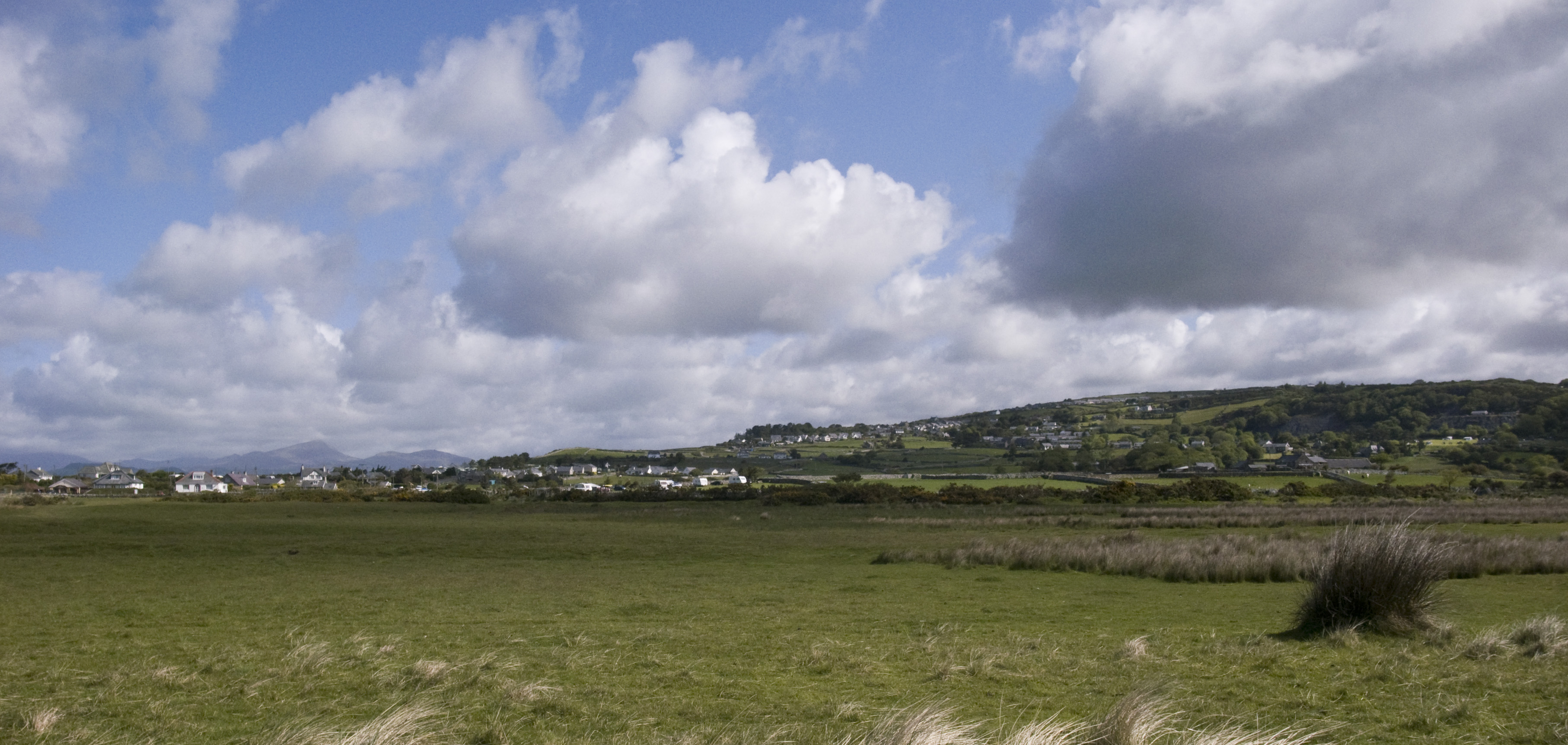
- Llandanwg (left) and Llanfair (right, on the hill)

- Location within Gwynedd
- Population: 453 (2011)
- OS grid reference: SH576291
- Community: Llanfair
- Principal area: Gwynedd
- Preserved county: Gwynedd
- Country: Wales
- Sovereign state: United Kingdom
- Post town: HARLECH
- Postcode district: LL46
- Dialling code: 01341
- Police: North Wales
- Fire: North Wales
- Ambulance: Welsh
- UK Parliament: Dwyfor Meirionnydd
- Senedd Cymru – Welsh Parliament: Dwyfor Meirionnydd
- List of places UK Wales Gwynedd 52.839°N 4.113°W Map of the community

Llanfair is a village and community in the Ardudwy area of Gwynedd in Wales. It has a population of 474, reducing to 453 at the 2011 census.

The village of Llanfair is situated to the east of the A496 coastal road between Llanbedr and Harlech, and includes Llandanwg and Pensarn.

The parish church of St Mair (St Mary), dating from the 12th century, was restored in the 19th century. It is a grade II* listed building.

The Chwarel Hen slate quarry, which operated in the 19th and early 20th century, is situated close to the village and is open to the public.
