= Pensarn railway station =

Railway station in Gwynedd, Wales

Pensarn Welsh: Pen-sarn

General information
- Location: Pensarn, Gwynedd; Wales
- Coordinates: 52.830248°N 4.110966°W
- Grid reference: SH578279
- Manager: Transport for Wales
- Platforms: 1

Other information
- Station code: PES
- Classification: DfT category F2

History
- Opened: 10 October 1867

Passengers
- 2021/22: ▲3,248
- 2022/23: ▼1,414
- 2023/24: ▼1,162
- 2024/25: ▲1,636
- 2025/26: ▲1,674
Location
Notes
- Passenger statistics from the Office of Rail and Road

Pensarn railway station serves the village of Pensarn in Gwynedd, Wales. The station is an unstaffed halt on the Cambrian Coast Railway with passenger services to Porthmadog, Pwllheli, Barmouth, Machynlleth and Shrewsbury.

The station opened as Pensarn but on 1 April 1885 it was renamed Llanbedr and Pensarn (Welsh: Llanbedr a Phensarn) and then on 8 May 1978 it reverted to its original name of Pensarn upon the renaming of Talwrn Back station (one stop to the south) to Llanbedr. Most trains call only on request.

Abergele and Pensarn railway station is on the North Wales Coast Line.

Preceding station	National Rail	Following station
Llandanwg	Transport for Wales Cambrian Coast Line	Llanbedr
	Historical railways	
Llandanwg; Line and station open	Cambrian Railways; Aberystwith and Welsh Coast Railway	Llanbedr; Line and station open
