= Pensarn, Gwynedd =

Village in Gwynedd, Wales

Coordinates: 52.829°N 4.111°W

Pensarn
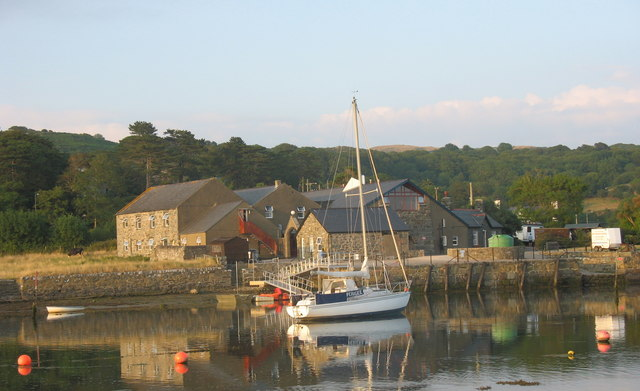
- Pensarn Wharf

- Location within Gwynedd
- OS grid reference: SH577279
- Community: Llanfair
- Principal area: Gwynedd
- Preserved county: Gwynedd
- Country: Wales
- Sovereign state: United Kingdom
- Post town: HARLECH
- Postcode district: LL46
- Dialling code: 01341
- Police: North Wales
- Fire: North Wales
- Ambulance: Welsh
- UK Parliament: Dwyfor Meirionnydd
- Senedd Cymru – Welsh Parliament: Dwyfor Meirionnydd

Pensarn (or Pen-sarn) is a small village in the Ardudwy area of Gwynedd, Wales. It is situated on the coastal road between Llanbedr and Harlech.

Pensarn railway station is an unstaffed halt on the Cambrian Coast Railway. The Christian Mountain Centre (CMC) is housed in the old Pensarn Wharf buildings.
