= Llanbedr =

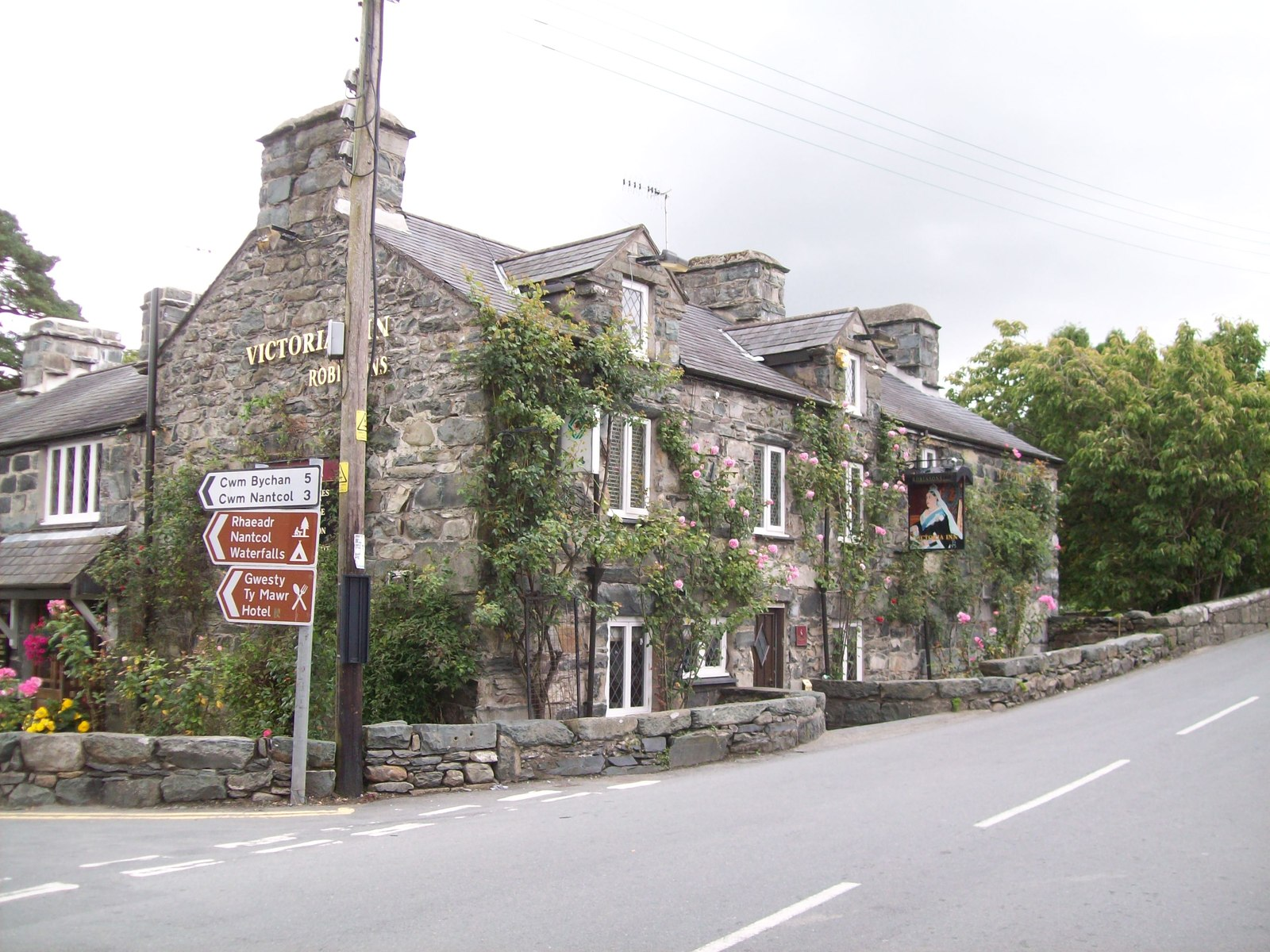
- Victoria Inn, Llanbedr

- Location within Gwynedd
- Population: 645 (2011)
- OS grid reference: SH582268
- Community: Llanbedr
- Principal area: Gwynedd
- Preserved county: Gwynedd
- Country: Wales
- Sovereign state: United Kingdom
- Post town: LLANBEDR
- Postcode district: LL45
- Dialling code: 01341
- Police: North Wales
- Fire: North Wales
- Ambulance: Welsh
- UK Parliament: Dwyfor Meirionnydd
- Senedd Cymru – Welsh Parliament: Dwyfor Meirionnydd
- List of places UK Wales Gwynedd 52.820°N 4.101°W Map of the community

Llanbedr (Welsh pronunciation) is a village and community 2.8 miles (4.5 km) south of Harlech. Administratively, it lies in the Ardudwy area, formerly Meirionnydd, of the county of Gwynedd, Wales. In 2011 the community had a population of 645.

== History ==
Ancient monuments at Llanbedr include Neolithic standing stones; the Stones of Llanbedr and Bronze Age hut circles. The village originally grew around the slate quarrying industry. Glyn Pedr is a Victorian Grade II listed residence on Maes Ffynnon.

During the First World War, Marian Antonia Gamwell, a widow, created a British Red Cross auxiliary hospital at her new home, the country house called Aber Artro, at Llanbedr.

== Climate ==
Climate data for Llanbedr Airfield (1991–2020)
Month	Jan	Feb	Mar	Apr	May	Jun	Jul	Aug	Sep	Oct	Nov	Dec	Year
Record high °C (°F)	12.8 (55.0)	15.3 (59.5)	19.0 (66.2)	23.9 (75.0)	25.8 (78.4)	29.9 (85.8)	30.7 (87.3)	30.1 (86.2)	25.4 (77.7)	20.7 (69.3)	19.6 (67.3)	15.4 (59.7)	30.7 (87.3)
Mean daily maximum °C (°F)	8.1 (46.6)	8.4 (47.1)	10.2 (50.4)	13.0 (55.4)	15.9 (60.6)	18.0 (64.4)	19.6 (67.3)	19.3 (66.7)	17.9 (64.2)	14.5 (58.1)	11.5 (52.7)	9.2 (48.6)	13.8 (56.8)
Daily mean °C (°F)	5.4 (41.7)	5.6 (42.1)	6.8 (44.2)	9.2 (48.6)	11.9 (53.4)	14.3 (57.7)	16.2 (61.2)	16.0 (60.8)	14.3 (57.7)	11.5 (52.7)	9.1 (48.4)	6.3 (43.3)	10.6 (51.1)
Mean daily minimum °C (°F)	2.6 (36.7)	2.7 (36.9)	3.4 (38.1)	5.5 (41.9)	7.9 (46.2)	10.6 (51.1)	12.8 (55.0)	12.7 (54.9)	10.8 (51.4)	8.4 (47.1)	6.7 (44.1)	3.4 (38.1)	7.3 (45.1)
Record low °C (°F)	−6.3 (20.7)	−6.4 (20.5)	−6.3 (20.7)	−3.5 (25.7)	0.3 (32.5)	1.4 (34.5)	4.9 (40.8)	4.8 (40.6)	4.0 (39.2)	−1.7 (28.9)	−4.9 (23.2)	−6.3 (20.7)	−6.4 (20.5)
Average precipitation mm (inches)	95.8 (3.77)	100.1 (3.94)	72.6 (2.86)	55.7 (2.19)	57.3 (2.26)	68.7 (2.70)	90.5 (3.56)	82.5 (3.25)	83.5 (3.29)	118.6 (4.67)	131.9 (5.19)	143.1 (5.63)	1,100.3 (43.32)
Average precipitation days (≥ 1.0 mm)	16.9	13.6	13.9	11.8	11.0	11.4	13.1	13.5	13.5	16.2	17.9	18.2	171.1
Source 1: Met Office
Source 2: Starlings Roost Weather

== Church and chapel ==
The church of St Peter, after whom the village is named (Pedr being the Welsh for Peter), is a Grade II* listed building.

In 2019 approval was given to convert Capel Moriah in Llanbedr, which had gone out of use, into a Mosque.

About 1 mile (1.6 km) east of the village centre is the hamlet of Pentre Gwynfryn whose chapel, Capel Salem, was the subject of a painting by the artist Sydney Curnow Vosper. The painting, entitled Salem, showed a member of the congregation, Siân Owen, in traditional Welsh costume and became famous throughout Britain in the mid-20th century.

== Airport ==
The village is home to Llanbedr Airport, a general aviation aerodrome. Until 2004 the site was operated as a military airfield by the Defence Evaluation and Research Agency (DERA) and QinetiQ as a launch site for remotely-piloted drones for use as aerial targets by the RAF and other UK forces. The airfield was included in the Snowdonia Enterprise Zone by the Welsh Government in January 2013.

In 2018 the airport became home to a flying school offering pleasure flights and flying lessons.

After the UK passed 2021 enabling legislation, in 2022, the Welsh Government announced plans to develop space launch capability at the site, to be named Spaceport Snowdonia.

== Amenities ==
The Morfa Dyffryn sand dunes and Mochras (Shell Island) lie nearby. It has two public houses.

To the north of the village is the smaller village of Pensarn, situated at the estuary of the River Artro. This is the location of Llanbedr & Pensarn Yacht Club and the Christian Mountain Centre, a residential adventure activity centre.

== Railways ==
Llanbedr railway station, formerly known as Talwrn Bach Halt, is a little out of the village itself and is served by the Cambrian Line.

== Governance ==
An electoral ward in the same name existed. This ward also covered the Community of Llanfair. The total ward population at the 2011 Census was 1,098. From the 2022 Gwynedd Council election the ward was merged with Harlech, renamed Harlech a Llanbedr and the representation increased to 2 county councillors.

== Twinning ==
In 2008 Llanbedr was twinned with Huchenfeld, Germany, following many years of exchanges between schools, churches, musicians and community leaders, in remembrance of the occurrences at Pforzheim and Huchenfeld during the Second World War.

== Notable people ==
- Henry Lloyd (ca.1718 – 1783), a Welsh army officer and military writer.
- Katherine Mudge (1881–1975), a British archer; she competed at the 1908 Summer Olympics in London.
- Philip Pullman (born 1946), an English writer; his formative years were spent in Llanbedr.

== See also ==
- Petrosomatoglyph St Mary's footprints at Llan Maria.
