= Morfa Dyffryn =

Beach in Gwynedd, Wales

Coordinates: 52°47′36″N 4°08′08″W

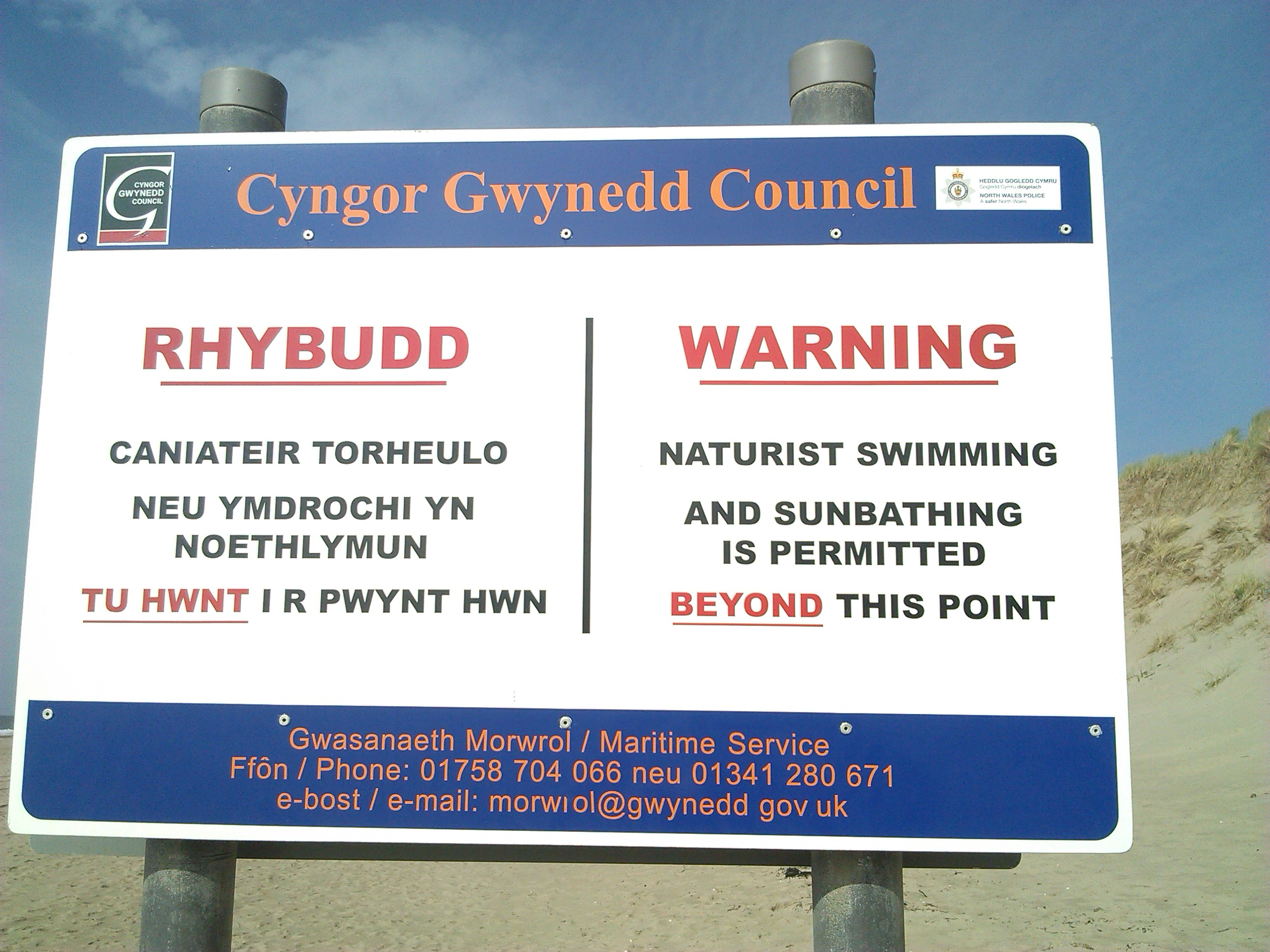

Morfa Dyffryn beach is on the west coast of Wales, between Barmouth and Harlech in Gwynedd. This sandy beach is several miles long and is chiefly known for having an officially recognised naturist area, 1 kilometre (1,100 yd) in length. The beach is very clean and is also known for regular sightings of dolphins.

The nearest settlements are the villages of Dyffryn Ardudwy and Llanbedr where several camp and caravan sites are available.

== Naturism at Morfa Dyffryn ==
In 2000, after complaints from local residents of indecent exposure on other parts of beach and the access footpaths, steps were taken to designate a clearly marked 1 kilometre length of the beach as officially naturist. Although the official designation was resisted by some local residents, complaints of indecent exposure and related behaviour have markedly decreased since 2000. The naturist section of the beach is now clearly marked by signs at both ends. Some naturists complain that the official section is too small - the traditional naturist area was 1 mile (1.6 km) in length.

Another complaint by naturists relates to the ban on naturist sunbathing in the sand dunes. Traditionally, most families and heterosexual couples have sunbathed on the beach while most gay men and many single heterosexual men have sunbathed on the dunes. Patrols by the police or beach patrol take place, and usually result in sunbathers being instructed to move down from the dunes onto the beach. The naturist section of the beach is up to 30 minutes' walk from the nearest car parks.
