= List of lakes of Wales =

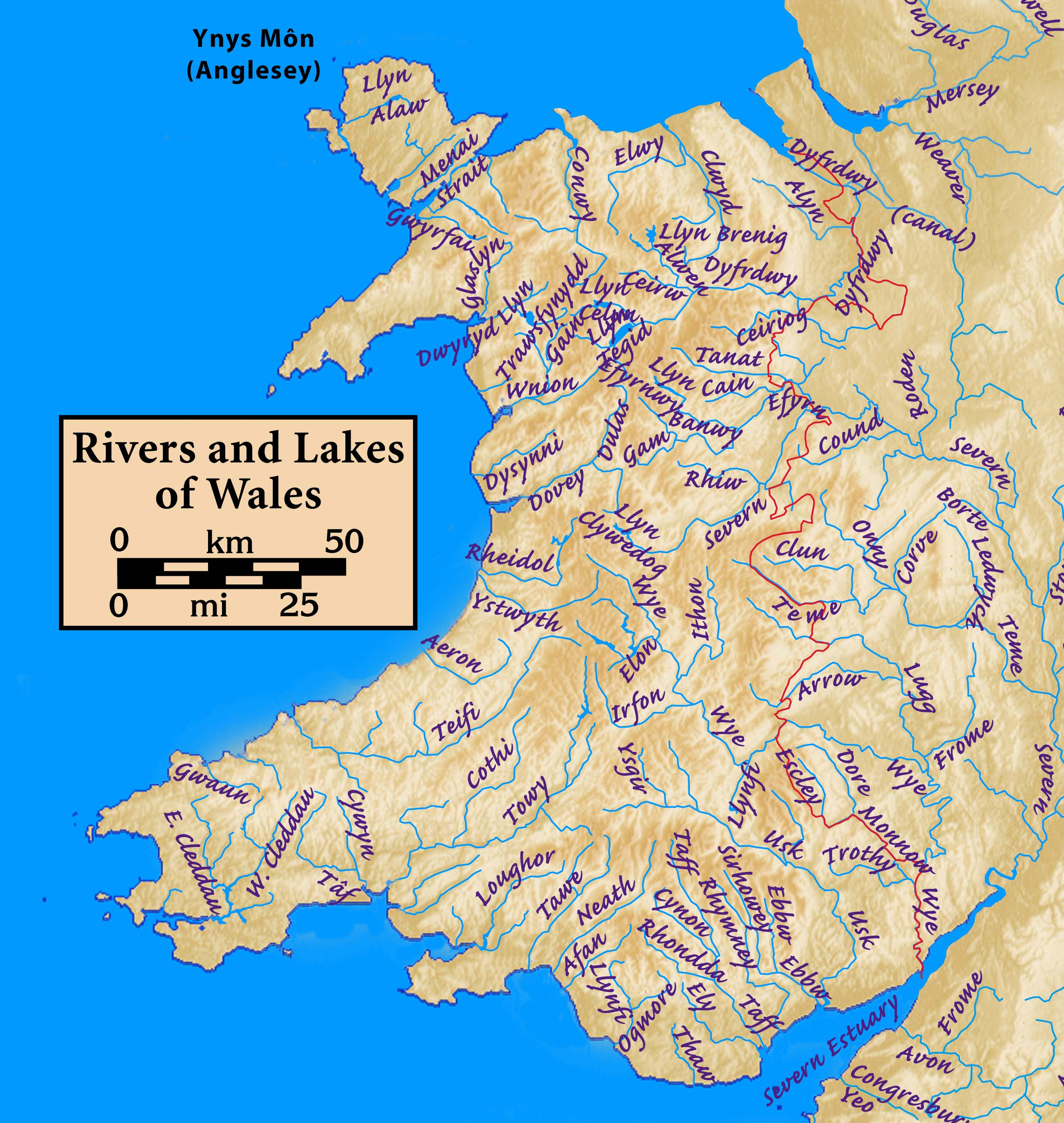

This is a list of lakes in Wales, including those created as reservoirs. The names of most lakes in Wales start with the word "Llyn", which is Welsh for "lake". Except where otherwise referenced, all lakes listed here are named on the relevant Ordnance Survey map at 1:25000 scale.

== By area ==
In terms of surface area, the ten largest lakes in Wales are

- Llyn Tegid (Bala Lake) — 1,196 acres (4.84 km^{2})
- Llyn Trawsfynydd — 1,180 acres (4.8 km^{2})
- Lake Vyrnwy — 1,120 acres (4.5 km^{2})
- Llyn Brenig — 894 acres (3.62 km^{2})
- Llyn Celyn — 800 acres (3.2 km^{2})
- Llyn Alaw — 762 acres (3.08 km^{2})
- Claerwen Reservoir — 655 acres (2.65 km^{2})
- Clywedog Reservoir — 601 acres (2.43 km^{2})
- Nant-y-moch Reservoir — 525 acres (2.12 km^{2})
- Caban Coch Reservoir — 519 acres (2.10 km^{2})

All of the above, with the exception of Llyn Tegid, are reservoirs held back by dams. Llyn Tegid was the largest natural lake in Wales though its level has been artificially controlled by sluices since about 1804. The largest natural lake in South Wales is Llangorse Lake (Llyn Syfaddan), which is also the second largest natural lake.

== By counties and county boroughs ==
This list of Welsh lakes ordered by principal areas (counties and county boroughs) includes lakes with a surface area of greater than 5 acres (2.0 ha), but excludes those lakes and ponds created as part of an active industrial site (i.e., works ponds) and also excludes service reservoirs used to store drinking water as part of the water supply system. Grid references identify the approximate centre of the lake or the dam in the case of artificial reservoirs. For some lakes the principal area boundary passes through a lake; in these cases the lake is represented in the list for each appropriate authority. Known occurrences include Llyn Brenig, Pontsticill Reservoir, Llwyn-on Reservoir, Cantref Reservoir and Dol-y-gaer Reservoir. All occurrences are marked with an asterisk (*).

=== Anglesey ===
Lake name	Catchment	Grid ref.	Area		Satatus/Use
Lake name	Catchment	Grid ref.	Acres	Hectares	Satatus/Use
Llyn Alaw	River Alaw	SH375853	762	308	water supply to north Anglesey
Llyn Bodgylched	No main catchment	SH585770
Llyn Cefni	Afon Cefni	SH443771	167	68	water supply to central Anglesey
Llyn Coron	No main catchment	SH380700	69	28
Llyn Dinam	No main catchment	SH312778	24	9.7
Llyn y Gors	No main catchment	SH575748			amenity (fishing)
Llyn Gwaith-glo	No main catchment	SH450713
Llyn Llygeirian	No main catchment	SH347898
Llyn Llywenan	No main catchment	SH347815			Largest natural body of water on Anglesey
Llyn Llwydiarth	Afon Braint	SH549786
Llyn Maelog	No main catchment	SH325730	65	26	former water supply to Rhosneigr
Llyn Pen y Parc	No main catchment	SH585751			water supply (disused)
Llyn Penrhyn	No main catchment	SH313770	55	22	RSPB bird reserve
Llyn Rhosddu	No main catchment	SH425648
Llyn Traffwll	No main catchment	SH325770	91	37
Llyn Treflesg	No main catchment	SH307770			RSPB bird reserve

=== Blaenau Gwent ===
Lake name	Catchment	Grid ref.	Area		Satatus/Use
Lake name	Catchment	Grid ref.	Acres	Hectares	Satatus/Use
Blaen-y-Cwm Reservoir (Blaen Clydach Reservoir)	Ebbw River/River Clydach	SO174131	50	20	Reservoir, originally constructed in 1813 to supply the Nantyglo Ironworks.
Carno Reservoir	Ebbw River	SO164131			reservoir
Cwmtillery Reservoir	Ebbw River	SO220071			reservoir
Lower Boat Pond	Ebbw River	SO174118	6.25	2.53	amenity, formerly industrial supply along with smaller Upper Boat Pond
Rhyd-y-blew Pond	Ebbw River	SO160112
Parc Brynbach lake	Sirhowy River	SO127101			amenity
Shon-Sheffrey's Reservoir	Sirhowy River	SO129116			reservoir

=== Bridgend ===
Lake name	Catchment	Grid ref.	Area		Satatus/Use
Lake name	Catchment	Grid ref.	Acres	Hectares	Satatus/Use
Kenfig Pool	River Kenfig	SS797815	70	28	natural lake
Craig yr Aber Reservoir	Nant Craig yr Aber	SS853857			man-made dam

=== Caerphilly ===
Lake name	Catchment	Grid ref.	Area		Satatus/Use
Lake name	Catchment	Grid ref.	Acres	Hectares	Satatus/Use
Lower Blaen Rhymney Reservoir	Rhymney River	SO103103			reservoir
Upper Blaen Rhymney Reservoir	Rhymney River	SO098104			reservoir
Bute Town Reservoir	Rhymney River	SO101091
Caerphilly Castle moat	Rhymney River	ST155872
Nant-y-draenog Reservoir	Sirhowy River	ST188935	5	2.0	reservoir
Parc Cwm Darran Lake	Rhymney River	SO117032			amenity
Rhaslas Pond	Rhymney River	SO095072
Ffrwd Farm lake (west)	Rhymney River	ST154920			angling
Ffrwd Farm lake (east)	Rhymney River	ST155920			angling
Pen-y-fan Pond	Sirhowy River	SO196004	14	5.7	built as canal feed reservoir.

=== Cardiff ===
Lake name	Catchment	Grid ref.	Area		Satatus/Use
Lake name	Catchment	Grid ref.	Acres	Hectares	Satatus/Use
Cardiff Bay	River Taff/River Ely	ST190726	500	200	amenity
Hendre Lake	No main catchment	ST245805	12	4.9	recreation and amenity
Llanishen Reservoir	Rhymney River	ST185815	59	24	water supply to Cardiff
Lisvane Reservoir	Rhymney River	ST189822			water supply to Cardiff
Roath lake	Rhymney River	ST184795	30	12	recreation and amenity

=== Carmarthenshire ===
Lake name	Catchment	Grid ref.	Area		Satatus/Use
Lake name	Catchment	Grid ref.	Acres	Hectares	Satatus/Use
Llyn Brianne	River Tywi	SN790485	530	210	regulation reservoir
Garn Ffrwd pond?	Gwendraeth Fach	SN508142	5	2.0
Llanelli North Dock lake	Coastal waterbody	SS498996			amenity (former dock)
Llyn Llech Owen Reservoir	Gwendraeth Fawr	SN568151			amenity/reservoir
Cwm Lliedi Reservoir	Afon Lliedi	SN519036			ex water supply
Llyn y Fan Fach	River Tywi	SN803219	25	10	natural
Llyn Taliaris	Afon Dulais	SN634283
Lower Talley Lake	Afon Cothi	SN633331	62	25	natural lake
Lagoons at National Wetlands Centre	Coastal waterbodies	SS529986			conservation/wildlife
Old Castle Pond/Pond Twym	Coastal lake	SN500003			Amenity
Sandy Water	Coastal lake	SN495003			amenity
Upper Lliedi Reservoir	Afon Lliedi	SN511045			reservoir
Upper Talley Lake	Afon Cothi	SN631337			natural lake
Usk Reservoir	River Usk	SN832288			water supply
Delta Lake	Coastal lake	SS507987			amenity

=== Ceredigion ===
Lake name	Catchment	Grid ref.	Area		Satatus/Use
Lake name	Catchment	Grid ref.	Acres	Hectares	Satatus/Use
Llyn Bach	River Teifi	SN788668			natural lake
Llyn Berwyn	River Teifi	SN743569	40	16	natural lake
Llyn Craigypistyll	River Dyfi	SN722858			natural lake
Dinas Reservoir	River Rheidol	SN748821			hydroelectricity
Llyn Du	River Severn	SN800698			natural lake
Llyn Egnant	River Teifi	SN792674			water supply
Falcondale Lake	River Teifi	SN569499			amenity
Llyn Frongoch	River Ystwyth	SN721752			lead mining ?/ natural
Llyn Fyrddon Fach	River Severn	SN796701			natural lake
Llyn Fyrddon Fawr	River Severn	SN800708			natural lake
Llyn Glandwgan	River Ystwyth	SN707752			natural lake
Llyn y Gorlan	River Teifi	SN786670			water supply
Llyn Gwngi	River Severn	SN839729			natural lake
Llyn Gynon	River Severn	SN799647	70	28	natural lake
Llyn Hir	River Teifi	SN789676			water supply
Nant-y-moch Reservoir	River Rheidol	SN751872			hydroelectricity
Llyn Pond Gwaith	River Teifi	SN781675			Natural
Llyn Rhosrhydd	River Ystwyth	SN705759			natural lake
Llyn Syfydrin	River Rheidol	SN723848			natural lake
Llyn Teifi	River Teifi	SN781675			water supply

=== Conwy ===
Lake name	Catchment	Grid ref.	Area		Satatus/Use
Lake name	Catchment	Grid ref.	Acres	Hectares	Satatus/Use
Aled Isaf Reservoir	River Clwyd	SH912594	65.7	26.6	water supply
Llyn Aled	River Clwyd	SH917574	112.7	45.6	water supply
Llyn Alwen	River Dee	SH898565	65	26
Alwen Reservoir	River Dee	SH943538	372.9	150.9	water supply
Llyn Bochlwyd	River Ogwen	SH654592	10	4.0
Llyn Bodgynydd	River Conwy	SH760592	14	5.7	industrial supply (disused)
Llyn Brenig	River Dee	SH973555	920	370	flow regulation
Llyn Coedty	River Conwy	SH754666	11.6	4.7	hydroelectricity
Llyn Conwy	River Conwy	SH780462	101.3	41.0	water supply for Llanrwst
Llyn Cowlyd	River Conwy	SH727624	269	109	water supply for Conwy
Llyn Crafnant	River Conwy	SH749610	52	21	former water supply for Trefriw and Llanrwst
Dulyn Reservoir	River Conwy	SH700665	33	13	water supply
Llyn Eigiau	River Conwy	SH720651	120	49
Llyn Elsi	River Conwy	SH783552	26	11	water supply for Betws-y-coed
Llyn Geirionydd	River Conwy	SH763608	45	18
Llyn Goddionduon	River Conwy	SH753586	10	4.0
Llyn y Foel-frech	River Clwyd	SH919593			Tiny natural lake
Ffynnon Lloer	River Ogwen	SH662621	6	2.4
Ffynnon Llugwy	River Conwy	SH692627	40	16
Llynnau Mymbyr	River Conwy	SH708575	58	23
Llyn Ogwen	River Ogwen	SH659604	78	32
Llyn y Parc	River Conwy	SH792588	22	8.9
Llyn-y-foel	Afon Lledr	SH714547			natural lake

=== Denbighshire ===
Lake name	Catchment	Grid ref.	Area		Satatus/Use
Lake name	Catchment	Grid ref.	Acres	Hectares	Satatus/Use
Brickfields Pond	River Clwyd	SJ012803	8.9	3.6	Local nature reserve
Llyn Brân		SH961592	31.4	12.7	natural
Llyn Brenig	River Dee	SH973555	920	370	flow regulation
Llyn Cyfynwy		SJ217546	17.5	7.1
Llyn Gweryd		SJ172550	13.1	5.3
Llyn Mynyllod		SJ012402	6.2	2.5
Nant-y-Ffrith Reservoir	River Cegidog	SJ242530	12.1	4.9
Pendinas Reservoir	River Cegidog	SJ235518	16.3	6.6
Rhyl Marine Lake	River Clwyd	SH999804	28.7	11.6
unnamed lake on Rûg estate	River Dee	SJ058440	8.4	3.4

=== Flintshire ===
Lake name	Catchment	Grid ref.	Area		Satatus/Use
Lake name	Catchment	Grid ref.	Acres	Hectares	Satatus/Use
Llyn Helyg	River Clwyd	SJ113772	37	15
Padeswood Pool		SJ278619	12.6	5.1	angling
Shotwick Lake	River Dee	SJ315725			amenity
unnamed reservoir, Cilcain		SJ155641	5.4	2.2
unnamed reservoir, Oakenholt		SJ262710	5.7	2.3
Ysceifiog Lake		SJ147716	13.8	5.6

=== Gwynedd ===
Lake name	Catchment	Grid ref.	Area		Satatus/Use
Lake name	Catchment	Grid ref.	Acres	Hectares	Satatus/Use
Llyn yr Adar	River Glaslyn	SH655479	10	4.0
Llyn Anafon	Afon Aber	SH698698	13	5.3	water supply
Llyn Arenig Fach		SH827417	34	14	natural lake
Llyn Arenig Fawr	River Dee	SH846380	84	34	water supply for Bala town, natural lake
Llynnau Barlwyd	River Dwyryd	SH710484	10 and 5	4.0 and 2.0	industrial water supply
Llyn y Bi	River Mawddach	SH669264	6	2.4
Llyn Bodlyn	Afon Ysgethin	SH648239	42	17	water supply
Llyn Bowydd	River Dwyryd	SH725467	22	8.9	industrial water supply.
Llyn Caerwych	River Dwyryd	SH640350	5	2.0
Llyn Cau	River Dysynni	SH714123	33	13
Llyn Celyn	River Dee	SH860405	815	330	river regulation
Llyn Conglog	River Dwyryd	SH674473	18	7.3
Llyn Conglog Mawr	River Dwyryd	SH758387	8	3.2
Craiglyn Dyfi also written as Creiglyn Dyfi	River Dyfi	SH867225	15	6.1	natural corrie lake
Llyn Croesor	River Glaslyn	SH661457	5	2.0
Llyn Cwm Corsiog	Afon Dwyryd	SH663470	7	2.8	industrial water supply (disused)
Llyn Cwellyn	Afon Gwyrfai	SH559549	215	87	water supply, natural
Llyn Cwm Bychan	Afon Artro	SH640312	25	10
Llyn Cwm Dulyn	Afon Llyfni	SH492495	34	14	water supply
Llyn Cwmffynnon	River Conwy	SH649562	20	8.1
Llyn Cwm-mynach	River Mawddach	SH678237	14	5.7
Llyn Cwmorthin	River Dwyryd	SH677463	22	8.9
Llynnau Cwm Silyn	Afon Llyfni	SH513508	15 and 15	6.1 and 6.1
Llyn Cwm y Foel	River Glaslyn	SH655468	8	3.2
Llyn Cwmystradllyn	River Dwyfor	SH561444	98	40	natural lake
Llyn Cynwch	River Mawddach	SH737207	26	11	amenity
Llyn Dinas	River Glaslyn	SH616495	60	24	natural lake
Llynnau Diwaunedd	River Conwy	SH682537	19 and 13	7.7 and 5.3	natural lakes
Llyn Dulyn	Afon Ysgethin	SH661244	5	2.0	natural lake, reservoir
Llyn Du'r Arddu	River Seiont	SH600557	5	2.0	natural lake
Llyn Dwythwch	River Seiont	SH570580	24	9.7
Llyn y Dywarchen	Afon Gwyrfai	SH560534	40	16
Llyn Edno	River Glaslyn	SH663497	10	4.0
Llyn Eiddew-mawr	Afon Artro	SH646338	22	8.9
Llyn Ffynnon y Gwas	Afon Gwyrfai	SH591553	10	4.0
Llyn y Gadair	Afon Gwyrfai	SH568521	50	20
Llyn Gwynant	River Glaslyn	SH644519	85	34
Llyn Hesgyn	River Dee	SH885442	5	2.0
Llyn Hywel		SH663266	13	5.3
Llyn Idwal	River Ogwen	SH645596	28	11
Llyn Irddyn	Afon Ysgethin	SH629222			natural lake
Llyn Llagi	River Glaslyn	SH649482	8	3.2
Llyn Llydaw	River Glaslyn	SH629543	110	45
Llyn Llywelyn	River Glaslyn	SH562499	6	2.4
Llyn Mair	River Dwyryd	SH652412	14	5.7	Artificial lake
Llyn Manod	River Dwyryd	SH717449	16	6.5
Marchlyn Bach reservoir	River Seiont	SH607625
Marchlyn Mawr	River Seiont	SH615622			hydroelectricity
Llyn Mwyngil (Talyllyn Lake)	River Dysynni	SH717099	220	89
Llyn Nantlle Uchaf	Afon Llyfni	SH514530	80	32
Llyn Newydd	River Dwyryd	SH722471	12	4.9
Llyn Peris	River Seiont	SH591595	95	38	lower reservoir for pump storage hydro-electricity
Llyn Padarn	River Seiont	SH572613	280	110	natural lake used for recreation
Tanygrisiau Reservoir	River Dwyryd	SH679441	95	38
Llyn Tecwyn Isaf		SH629370	7	2.8
Llyn Tecwyn Uchaf	River Dwyryd	SH640381	31	13
Llyn Tegid (Bala Lake)	River Dee	SH911338	1,196	484	Largest natural water in Wales
Llyn Teyrn	River Glaslyn	SH641547	5	2.0
Llyn Trawsfynydd	River Dwyryd	SH674377	1,180	480	nuclear power (formerly) and hydroelectric energy
Llyn Tryweryn	River Dee	SH788384	20	8.1
Llyn Wylfa	Afon Mawddach	SH671162	6	2.4	natural lake

=== Merthyr Tydfil ===
Lake name	Catchment	Grid ref.	Area		Satatus/Use
Lake name	Catchment	Grid ref.	Acres	Hectares	Satatus/Use
Cyfarthfa Castle Lake	River Taff	SO039073			amenity
Dol-y-gaer (or Pentwyn) Reservoir *	River Taff	SO060118			water supply
Llwyn-on Reservoir *	River Taff	SO012113			water supply
Penywern Middle Pond	River Taff	SO073083			angling
Penywern Top Pond	River Taff	SO071086			angling
Pontsticill Reservoir *	River Taff	SO060118			water supply

=== Monmouthshire ===
Lake name	Catchment	Grid ref.	Area		Satatus/Use
Lake name	Catchment	Grid ref.	Acres	Hectares	Satatus/Use
Llandegfedd Reservoir	River Usk	ST325985	434	176	water supply
Pwll Pen-ffordd-goch / Keepers Pond	River Usk	SO255109			amenity, formerly served Garn-ddyrys ironworks
Wentwood Reservoir	River Usk	ST430929	41	17	water supply

=== Neath Port Talbot ===
Lake name	Catchment	Grid ref.	Area		Satatus/Use
Lake name	Catchment	Grid ref.	Acres	Hectares	Satatus/Use
Cwmwernderi Reservoir		SS817902			reservoir
Eglwys Nunydd	River Afan	SS791855	260	110	industrial water supply, fishing
Furzemill Pond	River Afan	SS810857	5	2.0	former millpond?
Llyn Fach	River Neath	SN905037			Natural lake
Rheola Pond	River Neath	SN843043
larger un-named lake at Aberclwyd	River Neath	SN847043			amenity
smaller un-named lake at Aberclwyd	River Neath	SN852045			amenity

=== Pembrokeshire ===
Lake name	Catchment	Grid ref.	Area		Satatus/Use
Lake name	Catchment	Grid ref.	Acres	Hectares	Satatus/Use
Bosherston Lakes	Coastal stream	SR974946			artificial
Llys-y-Frân Reservoir	Western Cleddau	SN036242	212	86	water supply
Rosebush Reservoir	Western Cleddau	SN061291	30	12	water supply

=== Powys ===
Lake name	Catchment	Grid ref.	Area		Satatus/Use
Lake name	Catchment	Grid ref.	Acres	Hectares	Satatus/Use
Abernant Lake	River Irfon	SN891462	5	2.0	Created in 1903 by damming an oxbow of the Irfon
Beacons Reservoir	River Taff	SN987182	52	21	water supply
Bugeilyn	River Dyfi	SN822923			Natural
Caban-coch Reservoir	River Severn	SN924645	500	200	water supply. See note regarding area
Cantref Reservoir *	River Taff	SN996154	42	17	water supply
Llyn Carw	River Wye	SN856611			tiny natural lake
Claerwen Reservoir	River Severn	SN854651	664	269	water supply
Llyn Clywedog	River Severn	SN911870			river regulation
Craig-goch Reservoir	River Severn	SN893686	217	88	water supply
Cray Reservoir	River Usk	SN883220	100	40	water supply
Llyn Cwm Llwch	River Usk	SO001220	1–2	0.40–0.81	tiny glacier lake
Dol-y-gaer (or Pentwyn) Reservoir *	River Taff	SO054144			water supply
Garreg-ddu Reservoir	River Severn	SN911639	500	200	water supply. See note regarding area
Llyn Glanmerin	River Dyfi	SN755990			natural lake
Glaslyn	River Dyfi	SN826941
Llyn Gludy	River Usk	SO018298
Llan Bwch-llyn Lake	River Wye	SO119463	30	12	Mesotrophic lake. Area is approximate.
Llangorse Lake	River Usk	SO132266	327	132	natural lake, largest in South Wales
Llangynidr Reservoir	Ebbw River	SO153141			reservoir
Llyn Lluncaws	Afon Tanat	SJ07143169			natural lake
Llyn y Fan Fawr	River Tawe	SN832216
Upper Neuadd Reservoir	River Taff	SO029188			water supply
Penygarreg Reservoir	River Severn	SN911673	124	50	water supply
Pontsticill Reservoir*	River Taff	SO060118			water supply
Pwll gwy-rhoc	River Clydach	SO183153	5	2.0	natural lake. Area is approximate.
Talybont Reservoir	River Usk	SO104205			water supply
Ty Mawr Pool	River Usk	SO074264			natural lake
Lake Vyrnwy	River Vyrnwy	SH989213			water supply
Ystradfellte Reservoir	River Neath	SN945175			water supply

Note: Caban Coch and Garreg-ddu reservoirs are separately named but form one contiguous area of water at normal levels. The area quoted is for the two combined. At high water levels, Pentwyn Reservoir is continuous with Pontsticill Reservoir, its dam being submerged.

=== Rhondda Cynon Taf ===
Lake name	Catchment	Grid ref.	Area		Satatus/Use
Lake name	Catchment	Grid ref.	Acres	Hectares	Satatus/Use
Cantref Reservoir *	River Taff	SN996154			water supply
Dare Valley Country Park lower lake	River Cynon	SN977028			amenity
Lluest-wen Reservoir	River Rhondda Fach	SN947017
Llwyn-on Reservoir *	River Taff	SO012113	150	61	water supply
Llyn Fawr	River Cynon	SN917034	24	9.7	Natural but expanded for water supply
Nant-hir Reservoir	River Cynon	SN989069
Nant-moel Reservoir	River Cynon	SN982071
Penderyn Reservoir	River Neath	SN938072
?Perthgelyn Reservoir	River Cynon	ST053970			reservoir

=== Swansea ===
Lake name	Catchment	Grid ref.	Area		Satatus/Use
Lake name	Catchment	Grid ref.	Acres	Hectares	Satatus/Use
Lake Fendrod	River Tawe	SS676967	13	5.3	amenity
Lower Lliw Reservoir	River Lliw	SN650036			water supply
Oxwich Marsh Lake	coastal stream	SS503873	15	6.1	natural lake. Area is a minimum figure.
Upper Lliw Reservoir	River Lliw	SN661062			water supply
Tawe Barrage	River Tawe	SS664926			amenity
Specimen Lake	River Loughor	SN598056	10	4.0	amenity/angling

=== Torfaen ===
Lake name	Catchment	Grid ref.	Area		Satatus/Use
Lake name	Catchment	Grid ref.	Acres	Hectares	Satatus/Use
Blaen Bran Reservoir (lower)	Afon Lwyd	ST267971
Coity Pond	Afon Lwyd	SO233090			former reservoir

=== Vale of Glamorgan ===
Lake name	Catchment	Grid ref.	Area		Satatus/Use
Lake name	Catchment	Grid ref.	Acres	Hectares	Satatus/Use
Cosmeston Lake	River Cadoxton	ST176692			amenity
Hensol Lake	River Ely	ST045789			amenity and reservoir
Hensol Mill Pond	River Ely	ST050790	6	2.4	former mill pond

=== Wrexham ===
Lake name	Catchment	Grid ref.	Area		Satatus/Use
Lake name	Catchment	Grid ref.	Acres	Hectares	Satatus/Use
Cae Llwyd Reservoir	River Dee	SJ270479	10.6	4.3
Chirk Castle Lake	River Dee	SJ269386	11.1	4.5
Fenn's Bank Mere		SJ505386	8.4	3.4
Gresford Flash	River Dee	SJ346536	8.2	3.3	amenity
Hanmer Mere		SJ452392	44.4	18.0	natural lake, SSSI
Monk's Pool	River Dee	SJ303448	5.2	2.1
Pant-yr-ochain Lake	River Dee	SJ349529	14.1	5.7
Penycae Top Reservoir	River Dee	SJ267452	6.2	2.5
Ty Mawr Reservoir	River Dee	SJ276480	21.3	8.6
Wynnstay Park Lake	River Dee	SJ307428	8.9	3.6

== By national park ==
Lakes and reservoirs within each of Wales' three national parks.

=== Brecon Beacons ===
Lake name	Catchment	Grid ref.	Area		Status/Use	County / County Borough(s)
Lake name	Catchment	Grid ref.	Acres	Hectares	Status/Use	County / County Borough(s)
Beacons Reservoir	River Taff	SN987182	52	21	water supply	Powys
Cantref Reservoir *	River Taff	SN996154	42	17	water supply	Powys, Rhondda Cynon Taf
Cray Reservoir	River Usk	SN883220	100	40	water supply	Powys
Dol-y-gaer (or Pentwyn) Reservoir *	River Taff	SO054144			water supply	Powys
Llyn Gludy	River Usk	SO018298				Powys
Llangorse Lake	River Wye	SO132266	327	132	natural lake	Powys
Llangynidr Reservoir	Ebbw River	SO153141			reservoir	Powys
Llwyn-on Reservoir *	River Taff	SO012113	150	61	water supply	Merthyr Tydfil, Rhondda Cynon Taf
Llyn y Fan Fawr	River Tawe	SN832216			natural lake	Powys
Upper Neuadd Reservoir	River Taff	SO029188			water supply	Powys
Pontsticill Reservoir*	River Taff	SO060118			water supply	Merthyr Tydfil, Powys
Pwll Gwy-rhoc	River Clydach	SO183153	5	2.0	natural lake. Area is approximate.	Powys
Talybont Reservoir	River Usk	SO104205			water supply	Powys
Ty Mawr Pool	River Usk	SO074264			natural lake	Powys
Usk Reservoir	River Usk	SN832288			water supply	Carmarthenshire, Powys
Ystradfellte Reservoir	River Neath	SN945175			water supply	Powys

=== Pembrokeshire Coast ===
Lake name	Catchment	Grid ref.	Area		Status/Use	Principal area/s
Lake name	Catchment	Grid ref.	Acres	Hectares	Status/Use	Principal area/s
Bosherston Lakes	Coastal stream	SR974946			natural lakes	Pembrokeshire
Rosebush Reservoir, Rosebush	Western Cleddau	SN061291	30	12	water supply	Pembrokeshire

=== Snowdonia ===
Lake name (Note: See also: Recommended place-names in Snowdonia#List of standardised lake names.)	Catchment	Grid ref.	Area		Status/Use	Principal area/s
Lake name	Catchment	Grid ref.	Acres	Hectares	Status/Use	Principal area/s
Llyn yr Adar	River Glaslyn	SH655479	10	4.0		Gwynedd
Llyn Anafon	Afon Aber	SH698698	13	5.3	water supply
Llyn Arenig Fach		SH827417	34	14	natural lake	Gwynedd
Llyn Arenig Fawr	River Dee	SH846380	84	34	water supply, natural lake	Gwynedd
Llynnau Barlwyd	River Dwyryd	SH710484	10 and 5	4.0 and 2.0	industrial water supply	Gwynedd
Llyn y Bi	River Mawddach	SH669264	6	2.4		Gwynedd
Llyn Bochlwyd	River Ogwen	SH654592	10	4.0		Conwy
Llyn Bodgynydd		SH760592	14	5.7	industrial supply (disused)	Conwy
Llyn Bodlyn	Afon Ysgethin	SH648239	42	17	water supply	Gwynedd
Llyn Bowydd	River Dwyryd	SH725467	22	8.9	industrial water supply	Gwynedd
Llyn Caerwych	River Dwyryd	SH640350	5	2.0		Gwynedd
Llyn Cau	River Dysynni	SH714123	33	13		Gwynedd
Llyn Celyn	River Dee	SH858405	815	330	river regulation	Gwynedd
Llyn Coedty	River Conwy	SH754666	11.6	4.7	hydroelectricity	Conwy
Llyn Conglog	River Dwyryd	SH674473	18	7.3		Gwynedd
Llyn Conglog Mawr	River Dwyryd	SH758387	8	3.2		Gwynedd
Llyn Conwy	River Conwy	SH780462	101.3	41.0	water supply for Llanrwst	Conwy
Llyn Cowlyd	River Conwy	SH727624	269	109	water supply for Conwy	Conwy
Llyn Crafnant	River Conwy	SH749610	52	21	former water supply	Conwy
Creiglyn Dyfi	River Dyfi	SH867225	15	6.1	natural corrie lake	Gwynedd
Llyn Croesor	River Glaslyn	SH661457	5	2.0		Gwynedd
Llyn Cwm Corsiog		SH663470	7	2.8	industrial water supply (disused)
Llyn Cwellyn	Afon Gwyrfai	SH559549	215	87	water supply	Gwynedd
Llyn Cwm Bychan	Afon Artro	SH640312	25	10		Gwynedd
Llyn Cwm Dulyn	Afon Llyfni	SH492495	34	14	water supply	Gwynedd
Llyn Cwmffynnon	River Conwy	SH649562	20	8.1		Gwynedd
Llyn Cwm-mynach	River Mawddach	SH678237	14	5.7		Gwynedd
Llyn Cwmorthin	River Dwyryd	SH677463	22	8.9		Gwynedd
Llynnau Cwm Silyn	Afon Llyfni	SH513508	15 and 15	6.1 and 6.1		Gwynedd
Llyn Cwm y Foel	River Glaslyn	SH655468	8	3.2		Gwynedd
Llyn Cwmystradllyn	River Dwyfor	SH561444	98	40	natural lake	Gwynedd
Llyn Cynwch	River Mawddach	SH737207	26	11	amenity	Gwynedd
Llyn Dinas	River Glaslyn	SH616495	60	24	natural lake	Gwynedd
Llynnau Diwaunedd	River Conwy	SH682537	19 and 13	7.7 and 5.3	natural lakes	Gwynedd
Llyn Dulyn	Afon Ysgethin	SH661244	5	2.0	natural lake, reservoir	Gwynedd
Dulyn Reservoir	River Conwy	SH700665	33	13	water supply	Conwy
Llyn Du'r Arddu	River Seiont	SH600557	5	2.0	natural lake	Gwynedd
Llyn Dwythwch	River Seiont	SH570580	24	9.7		Gwynedd
Llyn y Dywarchen	Afon Gwyrfai	SH560534	40	16		Gwynedd
Llyn Edno	River Glaslyn	SH663497	10	4.0		Gwynedd
Llyn Eiddew-mawr	Afon Artro	SH646338	22	8.9		Gwynedd
Llyn Eigiau	River Conwy	SH720651	120	49		Conwy
Llyn Elsi	River Conwy	SH783552	26	11	water supply	Conwy
Llyn Ffynnon y Gwas	Afon Gwyrfai	SH591553	10	4.0		Gwynedd
Llyn-y-foel	Afon Lledr	SH714547			natural lake	Conwy
Llyn y Gadair	Afon Gwyrfai	SH568521	50	20		Gwynedd
Llyn Geirionydd	River Conwy	SH763608	45	18		Conwy
Llyn Goddionduon	River Conwy	SH753586	10	4.0		Conwy
Llyn Gwynant	River Glaslyn	SH644519	85	34		Gwynedd
Llyn Hesgyn	River Dee	SH885442	5	2.0		Gwynedd
Llyn Hywel		SH663266	13	5.3		Gwynedd
Llyn Idwal	River Ogwen	SH645596	28	11		Gwynedd
Llyn Irddyn	Afon Ysgethin	SH629222			natural lake	Gwynedd
Llyn Llagi	River Glaslyn	SH649482	8	3.2		Gwynedd
Ffynnon Lloer	River Ogwen	SH662621	6	2.4		Conwy
Ffynnon Llugwy	River Conwy	SH692627	40	16		Conwy
Llyn Llydaw	River Glaslyn	SH629543	110	45		Gwynedd
Llyn Llywelyn	River Glaslyn	SH562499	6	2.4		Gwynedd
Llyn Mair	River Dwyryd	SH652412	14	5.7		Gwynedd
Marchlyn Bach reservoir	River Seiont	SH607625				Gwynedd
Marchlyn Mawr	River Seiont	SH615622			hydroelectricity	Gwynedd
Tal-y-llyn Lake (Llyn Mwyngil)	River Dysynni	SH717099	220	89		Gwynedd
Llynnau Mymbyr	River Conwy	SH708575	58	23		Conwy
Llyn Nantlle Uchaf	Afon Llyfni	SH514530	80	32		Gwynedd
Llyn Newydd	River Dwyryd	SH722471	12	4.9		Gwynedd
Llyn Ogwen	River Ogwen	SH659604	78	32		Conwy
Llyn y Parc	River Conwy	SH792588	22	8.9		Conwy
Tanygrisiau Reservoir	River Dwyryd	SH679441	95	38		Gwynedd
Llyn Tecwyn Isaf		SH629370	7	2.8		Gwynedd
Llyn Tecwyn Uchaf	River Dwyryd	SH640381	31	13		Gwynedd
Llyn Tegid (Bala Lake)	River Dee	SH911338	1,196	484		Gwynedd
Llyn Teyrn	River Glaslyn	SH641547	5	2.0		Gwynedd
Llyn Trawsfynydd	River Dwyryd	SH674377	1,180	480	nuclear power (formerly) & HEP	Gwynedd
Llyn Tryweryn	River Dee	SH788384	20	8.1		Gwynedd
Llyn Wylfa		SH671163	6	2.4		Gwynedd

== By supply to England ==
Many Welsh lakes supply the nation itself with water, however, some lakes and reservoirs supply England.

The main reservoirs created for this purpose include:

Reservoir name	Location	Built by	Supplies water to
Lake Vyrnwy	Powys	Liverpool Corporation	Liverpool, Cheshire and Manchester
Claerwen	Elan Valley reservoirs	Birmingham Corporation Water Department	Birmingham
Craig-goch	Elan Valley reservoirs	Birmingham Corporation Water Department	Birmingham
Pen-y-garreg	Elan Valley reservoirs	Birmingham Corporation Water Department	Birmingham
Garreg-ddu	Elan Valley reservoirs	Birmingham Corporation Water Department	Birmingham,
Caban-coch	Elan Valley reservoirs	Birmingham Corporation Water Department	Birmingham
Alwen Reservoir	Conwy	The Corporation of Birkenhead	Birkenhead
Llyn Celyn (via and Llyn Tegid)	Gwynedd	Liverpool Corporation Waterworks	Liverpool
Llyn Clywedog	Powys	Reed and Mallick of Salisbury	Shropshire, West Midlands to Bristol

== Former lakes ==
Lake name	Catchment	Grid ref.	Area (acres)	Status/Use	Principal area
Bryn-bach Pond	Sirhowy River	SO122100		formerly industrial use (not same site as modern lake)	Blaenau Gwent
Cairn Mound Impounding Reservoir	River Clydach	SO202136		former reservoir	Blaenau Gwent
Clyn-mil Pond	River Taff	SO062052		formerly industrial use	Merthyr Tydfil
Glyn-dyrys Pond	River Taff	SO049047		formerly industrial use	Merthyr Tydfil
Hirwaun Ponds	River Cynon	SN945060		formerly industrial use	Rhondda Cynon Taf
Lower Neuadd Reservoir	River Taff	SO030180		former reservoir (dam breached)	Merthyr Tydfil
Llyn Nantlle-isaf	Afon Llyfni	SH506528		natural lake	Gwynedd
Pitwellt Pond	River Taff	SO078098		former reservoir (dam breached)	Merthyr Tydfil
Rhyd-y-blew Pond (Rassa)	Ebbw River	SO160112		formerly industrial use	Blaenau Gwent
Scotch Peter's Reservoir	Sirhowy River	SO155088		former reservoir	Blaenau Gwent
