= Recommended place-names in Snowdonia =

Place-naming policy of Eryri NPA, Wales

The Eryri National Park Authority (previously Snowdonia NPA) has recommended the use of some Welsh place-names when referring to features in Snowdonia, Wales, now known by its Welsh language name, Eryri.

Most place-names in Snowdonia are of Welsh origin, with some of them having connections to Welsh folklore. However, a few recent private name-changes from Welsh into English have inspired a campaign to use the Welsh names of places in Snowdonia which currently use English place names or anglicisations, to allow the promotion of the Welsh language and culture. Standardisation of Welsh place names has also been conducted, choosing a preferred Welsh form over multiple versions.

In November 2024, the authority stated that the change to Yr Wyddfa and Eryri over Snowdon and Snowdonia respectively, had been a "success".

== Background ==
The status of Welsh place names had been debated for decades, with them only becoming present on road signs in Wales in the 1960s following a long campaign to make the signs bilingual rather than in English only. Protesters argued that the use of such English-only signs was an indication that Wales was an "English and British territory" and that bilingual signs would distinguish Wales as a separate country with its own language and identity.

In recent years, localised private name changes have been occurring elsewhere in Wales, replacing the previously long-standing Welsh name with an English alternative. This include the renaming of an Aberystwyth caravan park from the long-standing "Glan y Môr" to an English name "Aber Bay", a Ceredigion farm changing its name from "Faerdre Fach" to "Happy Donkey Hill" to appeal to tourists, and the use of "Cable Bay" over the older Welsh name of "Porth Trecastell" in Anglesey, and the tourist name "Lake Australia" over the older Welsh "Llyn Bochlwyd" in Snowdonia. These were cited as examples of Welsh place-names being under threat by language campaigners, who are now leading a campaign for the protection, re-emphasis and "rediscover[y]" of Welsh place-names.

In 2022, a Gwynedd councillor put forward a motion asking the national park authority to stop using the English names Snowdon and Snowdonia.

On 16 November 2023, the Snowdonia National Park Authority voted to use the Welsh names Eryri and Yr Wyddfa, over their pre-existing names used in English, Snowdonia and Snowdon, respectively. In the same meeting, the NPA adopted a paper on "Place Name Principles" which would be the guide the NPA is to use when addressing place-names within the national park. By the time of the meeting, the NPA had already prioritised the Welsh names in documents, while keeping the English names in parentheses as a temporary courtesy. The NPA stated that using the Welsh name would make visitors engage with the Welsh language and culture.

The national park authority worked with Cardiff University School of Welsh and the Welsh Language Commissioner to recommend a standard list of the names of lakes in Snowdonia. The NPA then voted in a meeting on 15 November 2023 to accept the list's recommendations; it voted unanimously in favour. The NPA stated that the list was to "safeguard" the area's Welsh place-names and its heritage. The list most notably recommends that use of all the few English-language names for lakes in Snowdonia be discouraged in favour of their Welsh names. Notable discouraged names are "Bala Lake" (or "Lake Bala"), to be replaced by "Llyn Tegid"; "Australia Lake" (or "Lake Australia"), to be replaced by "Llyn Bochlwyd"; and "Bearded Lake", to be replaced by "Llyn Barfog". The move was described as being part of a campaign by language activists for historical sites to be referred to by their Welsh names only, and was referred to as "Welsh names for Welsh places".

The NPA is to look at the names of waterfalls and mountains in the national park.

In November 2024, the authority stated that the name changes had been a "success" as many businesses and media had followed suit. The authority stated that a summer survey showed "strong support" from locals and visitors for the name change. While some concerns were raised over misconceptions by some that the Welsh names were new and mispronunciations, the authority stated that the change resulted in the park being more associated with a Welsh identity, and more different from other UK national parks. The authority is set to make a pronunciation guide, a report on the changes, and update its logo which still contains Snowdonia.

== Notable individual renamings ==
- Carnedd Uchaf to Carnedd Gwenllian – 2009 name change to honour Gwenllian of Wales.
- There has been dispute over the spelling of the name of the mountain Cadair Idris, with the national park authority preferring "Cader Idris". It has been argued that "Cadair" is the more-widely used correct spelling.
- Snowdon changed to Yr Wyddfa – On 16 November 2022, the NPA announced that it would be phasing out its use of "Snowdon" and instead be using the Welsh name "Yr Wyddfa". The Welsh Language Commissioner still recognises Snowdon in their list of standardised Welsh place-names in Gwynedd.
- Snowdonia National Park changed to Eryri National Park – On 16 November, the NPA announced that it would be phasing out its use of "Snowdonia" for the Welsh name "Eryri". The English name is set in law, so would still be required on statutory documents. A local marathon, the Snowdonia Marathon, endorsed this change when announced a rebranding as Marathon Eryri.

== Lake name standardisation ==
The main issues with the existing toponymy to be addressed, as part of a standardisation of names, were:

- To decide whether a name is to be with or without hyphens, or mutations, and recommend a name over colloquial versions.
- Consider the history, meaning and origin of the name. Emphasise local use, consultations with those closely connected to the names, and using specialised local knowledge.
- Using the knowledge of national park wardens to correct any misspellings that have been prevalent on maps for years.

=== List of standardised lake names ===
The list below is from the documents prepared for the 15 November 2023 meeting in which the national park authority voted on whether to support the list. However, the NPA has not publicly released a list, and it is not known whether its list matches that presented during the meeting. Some alternative names were provided in an earlier NPA meeting.

Various reasons were provided for the selection of names on the original list.

Recommended Welsh standard form(s) to be used in both Welsh and English (location provided for disambiguation)	Other/former Welsh form(s)	Other English name(s) (if any)
Creiglyn Dyfi	Craiglyn Dyfi	
Glaslyn	Llyn Glaslyn	
Gloywlyn	Gloyw Lyn	
Llyn Anafon	Llyn Anhafon	
Llyn Aran	Llyn Arran	
Llyn Arenig Fach	Llyn Arennig Fach	
Llyn Arenig Fawr	Llyn Arenig-Fawr Llyn Arennig Fawr	
Llyn Bach (in Rhyd-y-main)		
Llyn Bach (in Nant Peris)	Llyn Bâch	
Llyn Bach / Llyn y Tri Greyenyn (in Tal-y-llyn)		Potential names relating to "Mach Loop" (Used by nearest car park)
Llyn Barfog		Bearded Lake
Llyn Bochlwyd		Australia Lake Lake Australia
Llyn Bodgynydd Mawr	Bod Mawr (colloquial) Llyn Bod (colloquial) Llyn Bodgynydd	
Llyn Bodgynydd Bach	Bod Bach (colloquial) Cors Bodgynydd (colloquial)	
Llyn Bodlyn	Bodlyn	
Llyn Bodwenni	Llyn Bodweni	
Llyn Bowydd		
Llyn Bryn Du	Llyn Bryn-du	
Llyn Bwrw Eira	Llyn Bwrw-eira	
Llyn Bwrw Eira Pellaf	Llyn Bwrw-eira-pellaf	
Llyn Bychan		
Llyn Caerwych		
Llyn Cau	Llyn y Cau	
Llyn Clogwyn Brith	Llyn Clogwyn-brîth Llyn Clogwyn brith Llyn Clogwyn-brith	
Llyn Clyd		
Llyn Clyd Bach		
Llyn Coch (in Betws Garmon)		
Llyn Coch (in Blaenau Ffestiniog)	Llyn Côch	
Llyn Coety	Llyn Coedty	Coedty Reservoir
Llyn Conglog		
Llyn Conglog Bach	Llyn Conglog-bach Llyn Conglog-bâch	
Llyn Conglog Mawr	Llyn Conglog-mawr	
Llyn Conwy		
Llyn Corn Stwc	Llyn Corn y Stwc Llyn Corn-ystwc Llyn Corn-y-stwc Llyn Corn-stwc	
Llyn Cors y Barcud	Llyn Cors-y-barcud Llyn Cors Y Barcud Llyn Corsybarcud	
Llyn Corun	Llyn y Coryn	
Llyn Cowlyd		
Llyn Crafanc		
Llyn Crafnant		
Llyn Craig y Tân	Llyn Craig-y-tân Llyn Craig-y-tan	
Llyn Croesor		
Llyn Crych y Waun	Llyn Grych-y-waun Llyn Crych-y-waen Llyn Crych-y-waun	
Llyn Cwm Bach	Llyn Cwm-bach	
Llyn Cwm Bychan	Llyn Cwmbychan	
Llyn Cwm Corsiog	Llyn Cwm-corsiog Llyn Cwm corsiog Llyn Cwmcorsiog	
Llyn Cwm Dulyn (in Nebo)	Llyn Cwmdulyn	
Llyn Cwm y Foel	Llyn Cwm-y-foel	
Llyn Cwellyn		
Llyn Cwm Ffynnon	Llyn Cwmffynnon Llyn Cwm-y-ffynnon	
Llyn Cwm Hosan	Llyn Cwmhosan Llyn Cwm-hosan	
Llyn Cwm Mynach	Llyn Cwm-mynach Cwm-Mynach	
Llyn Cwmorthin		
Llyn Cwm y Foel	Llyn Cwm-y-foel Llyn Cwm Foel	
Llyn Cwm Ystradllyn	Llyn Cwmstradllyn	Cwm Ystradllyn Reservoir
Llyn Cynwch	Llyn Cnwch	
Llyn Cyri		
Llyn Cywion		
Llyn Dinas		
Llyn Du (in Pren-teg)	Llun Du	
Llyn Du (in Trawsfynydd)		
Llyn Du (in Bronaber)		
Llyn Dubach y Bont (in Llan Ffestiniog)	Llyn Dubach Y Bont Llyn Dubach-y-Bont Llyn Dubâch Llyn Dubach	Dubach Y Bont Lake
Llyn Dubach (in Maenofferen)	Llun Du-bâch Llun Dubach	
Llyn Dulyn (in Llanenddwyn)		
Llyn Du’r Arddu		
Llyn Dwythwch		
Llyn Dyrnogydd		
Llyn Edno		
Llyn Eiddew Bach	Llyn Eiddew-bach Llyn Eiddew bach	
Llyn Eiddew Mawr	Llyn Eiddew-mawr Llyn Eiddew mawr	
Llyn Eigiau		
Llyn Elsi		
Llyn Foel Dinas	Llyn Foeldinas Llyn Foel-Dinas	
Llyn Ffridd y Bwlch	Llyn Ffridd Y Bwlch Llyn Ffridd-y-bwlch Llyn Ffridd y-bwlch Llyn Ffridd(-ybwlch)	
Llyn Ffynhonnau	Llyn y Ffynhoniau	
Llyn Ffynnon y Gwas	Llyn Ffynnon-y-gwas Llyn Ffynnon-y-Gwas	
Llyn Gafr		
Llyn Garneddwen		
Llyn Geirionnydd	Llyn Geirionydd	
Llyn Gelligain	Llyn Gelli-Gain Llyn Gelli-gain	Gelli-Gain Reservoir
Llyn Glan Gors	Llyn Glangors Llyn Glan-gors	
Llyn Glas (in Blaenau Ffestiniog)		
Llyn Glas (in Rhyd-ddu)		
Llyn Glas (in Llanberis)	Liyn Glas	
Llyn Goddion Duon	Llyn Goddionduon Llyn Goddion-duon	
Llyn Gwernan		
Llyn Gwynant		
Llyn Hafod-y-llyn	Llyn Hafod y Llyn	
Llyn Hesgin	Llyn Hesgyn	
Llyn Hiraethlyn	Hiraethlyn	
Llyn Hywel		
Llyn Idwal		
Llyn Irddyn		
Llyn Iwerddon		
Llyn Jericho		
Llyn Llagi		
Llyn Llennyrch	Llyn Llenyrch	
Llyn Llydaw		
Llyn Llymbren	Llyn Lliwbrân Llyn Lliwbran Llyn Llyfnbren	
Llyn Llywelyn		
Llyn Mair		
Llyn Myngul	Llyn Mwyngil Llyn Tal-y-llyn	Tal-y-llyn Lake
Llyn Nadroedd		
Llyn Nantlle Uchaf		
Llyn Newydd		
Llyn Ogwen		
Llyn Owen y Ddôl	Llyn Owen-y-ddôl Llyn Owen-y-ddol Llyn Owen-Y-Ddol	
Llyn Padarn		
Llyn Pandy		
Llyn Pen Aran	Llyn Penaran	
Llyn Pencraig	Llyn Pen Craig	
Llyn Pen Ffridd Newydd	Llyn Penffriddnewydd	
Llyn Pen Moelyn	Llyn Penmoelyn	
Llyn Pen y Gwryd	Llyn Pen-y-gwryd Llyn Penygwryd	
Llyn Perfeddau		
Llyn Peris		
Llyn Pryfed		
Llyn Pwll y Gele	Llyn Pwll-y-gele Llyn Pwllygele	Pwll-y-Gele
Llyn Ruck		
Llyn Sarnau		
Llyn Serw		
Llyn Stwlan		
Llyn Tan y Graig	Llyn Tan-y-Graig Llyn Tan-y-graig	
Llyn Tecwyn Isaf		
Llyn Tecwyn Uchaf		
Llyn Tegid		Bala Lake Lake Bala Lake Tegid
Llyn Terfyn		
Llyn Teyrn		
Llyn Tomos Lewis		
Llyn Trawsfynydd		
Llyn Trefor		
Llyn Tryweryn		
Llyn Twr Glas	Llyn Twr-glas Llyn Twrglas Llyn Twr-glâs	
Llyn Tynymynydd	Llyn Tyn-y-Mynydd	
Llyn Wylfa		
Llyn y Bi	Llyn-y-Bi	
Llyn y Biswail		
Llyn y Cefn	Llyn-y-cefn	
Llyn y Cŵn	Llyn y Cwn	
Llyn y Drum		
Llyn y Drum Boeth	Llyn y Drum-boeth	
Llyn y Dywarchen (in Ffestiniog)		
Llyn y Dywarchen (in Betws Garmon)		
Llyn y Dywarchen (in Llanfihangel-y-traethau a Llandecwyn)	Llyn Dywarchen	
Llyn y Fawnog	Llyn-y-Fawnog	
Llyn y Fedw	Llyn-y-Fedw	
Llyn y Fign		
Llyn y Foel	Llyn-y-Foel Llyn-y-foel	
Llyn y Frân		
Llyn y Frithgraig	Llyn y Frith Graig	
Llyn y Gadair (in Betws Garmon)	Llyn y Gader	
Llyn y Gadair (in Brithdir ac Islaw’r-dref)	Llyn-y-Gadair	
Llyn y Garn		
Llyn y Garnedd		
Llyn y Garnedd Uchaf	Llyn y Garnedd-uchaf	
Llyn y Graig Wen	Llyn y Graig-wen Llyn y Graig-Wen	
Llyn y Garreg Wen	Llyn Gareg-wen	
Llyn y Gaseg Fraith	Llyn y Gaseg-fraith Llyn y Gaseg-Fraith Llyn Caseg-fraith	
Llyn y Gors		
Llyn y Manod	Llyn Manod	
Llyn y Morynion (in Ffestiniog)	Llyn Morwynion Morynyon	
Llyn y Morynion (in Llanbedr)	Llyn Morwynion	
Llyn y Parc	Llyn Parc	
Llyn y Tomla		
Llyn y Wrach	Llyn-y-Wrach	
Llyn y Wrysgan		
Llyn yr Adar		
Llyn yr Arddu		
Llyn yr Oerfel		
Llynnau Barlwyd		
Llynnau Cerrig y Myllt	Llynnau Cerrig-y-Myllt Llynnau Cerrig-y-myllt	
Llynnau Cregennen		Cregennan Lakes
Llynnau Cwm Silyn	Llynnau Cwmsilyn	
Llynnau Diffwys		
Llynnau Duweunydd	Llynau Diwaunydd	
Llynnau Gamallt		Gamallt Lakes
Llynnau Mymbyr		
Llynnau’r Cŵn	Llynnau'r Cwn	
Marchlyn Bach		
Marchlyn Mawr		
Llyn Melynllyn	Melynllyn	
Merddwr Duweunydd	Merddwr Diwaunydd	
Pwll Vivian		

== Further reviews ==
The NPA has announced that it is now to look at the names of waterfalls and mountains in the national park. A list of standardised names of waterfalls has not been released as of November 2023, but it is reportedly likely to encourage use of Welsh names only.

== See also ==
- List of lakes in Wales
- List of standardised Welsh place-names
- List of standardised Welsh place-names in Gwynedd
- List of standardised Welsh place-names in Conwy County Borough
