= List of estuaries of Wales =

The following is a list of estuaries of Wales. Wales's many estuaries are generally named for the principal river which enters the sea through them. Those indicated thus * are listed at this reference.

- Afan estuary*
- Alaw estuary*
- Artro estuary*
- Cefni estuary*
- Conwy estuary
- Daugleddau estuary
- Dee estuary*
- Dwyryd estuary (known as Traeth Bach)
- Dyfi estuary*
- Dysynni estuary*
- Ebbw estuary
- Foryd Bay* (estuary of the Gwyrfai and Carrog rivers)
- Glaslyn estuary or Traeth Bach*
- Gwendraeth estuary
- Lavan Sands (not strictly an estuary but included in the NCC list of estuaries)
- Loughor estuary* (a.k.a. Burry Inlet)
- Mawddach estuary
- Neath estuary
- Nevern estuary*
- Ogmore estuary*
- Pwllheli Harbour* (estuary of the rivers Erch and Rhyd-hir)
- Rhymney estuary
- Severn Estuary*
- Taf estuary
- Tawe estuary
- Teifi estuary*
- Thaw estuary
- Traeth-coch
- Traeth Dulas
- Traeth melynog*
- Towy estuary
- Usk estuary
- Wye estuary
