= Reservoirs of Wales =

Overview of reservoir system in Wales

There are a large number of reservoirs in Wales reflecting the need for the supply of water for both industry and for consumption, both within the country itself and in neighbouring England. A number also provide hydroelectricity and many old reservoirs also provided motive power for industries, especially for the processing of minerals such as metal ores and slate.

Wales has a relatively high rainfall and significant areas of mountainous topography which are sparsely populated which ensures that water is a plentiful natural resource. Much of the south and east of England has significantly lower rainfall and a high population density which puts significant strain on the water supply infrastructure there. Collecting water in deep valleys with high river flows is far more efficient that trying to collect sparse rainfall in a generally flat landscape. Because of this engineers have viewed Wales as a potential supply of water. The rapidly growing populations of the industrial centres of Britain in the Industrial Revolution made the need for high volume supplies of clean water even more important and Wales was seen as the ideal source. Such engineering and economic views paid scant regard to the social, cultural and linguistic impacts that the constructions of large reservoirs in Wales would create.

Some reservoirs have been formed by the raising of dams on water courses, others are natural water bodies, the levels of which have been raised to various degrees both for direct supply of water or else for regulation of supply with water being extracted from the river some way downstream. Many reservoirs which were constructed for one purpose e.g. industry, may now serve different or additional purposes e.g amenity or, as in many cases, have been abandoned entirely. Reservoirs range in size with many under 1 acre in area serving local needs, up to Llyn Trawsfynydd which extends to 1,128 acres (456 ha). Llyn Tegid (Bala Lake) is a natural lake which at 1,192 acres (482 ha), slightly exceeds Llyn Trawsfynydd in size, but whose height has been slightly raised.

== History ==
=== North Wales ===
Within Snowdonia, numerous existing natural lakes were co-opted to provide local water supplies during the late 19th and early 20th centuries. Within the Carneddau, Llyn Dulyn and Llyn Melynllyn were dammed in 1881 and 1887 respectively, to provide water to Llandudno. Llyn Anafon was dammed in 1931 to allow water supply for Abergwyngregyn, Llanfairfechan and the surrounding areas.

=== South Wales ===
Cardiff Corporation Waterworks opened both Llanishen Reservoir and Lisvane Reservoir in 1886. It later commissioned the construction of three reservoirs in Cwm Taf to supply water to the capital. Beacons Reservoir was the first to take shape, between 1893 and 1897, Cantref Reservoir was built between 1886 and 1892 and the damming of the largest of the three, Llwyn-onn Reservoir began in 1911 with the supply of water starting in the mid 1920s.

The construction of Crai Reservoir was completed in 1907 and supplied Swansea with water. Llandegfedd Reservoir was opened by the Newport Corporation in May 1965, covering 434 acres (1.76 square kms). It was originally built to supply water to Spencer Steelworks in Llanwern.

Grwyne Fawr Reservoir, the only reservoir within the Black Mountains massif was completed by Abertillery and District Water Board in 1928, serving to supply water to various towns in the traditional county of Monmouthshire. A holding reservoir in Cwmtillery was constructed as a part of the scheme. Blaenycwm Reservoir to the northwest of Brynmawr, was originally constructed as a water supply for Nantyglo Ironworks but enlarged for public supply during the 20th century.

Llyn Brianne was constructed in the late 1960s to provide additional water supply to South Wales via the Felindre water treatment works. The original intention was to supplement supplies of water to Swansea, Neath and Port Talbot.

== List of reservoirs ==
=== Notable reservoirs ===
- Llyn Brianne has the tallest dam in the UK
- Clywedog Reservoir (Llyn Clywedog) has the tallest mass of concrete in Britain

=== List of largest reservoirs ===
This is a list of the 20 largest reservoirs in Wales defined by Natural Resources Wales.

Number	Reservoir name	Image	Principal area	Manager	Year built	Raised capacity (m3)	Ref.
1	Llyn Celyn		Gwynedd	Dŵr Cymru Welsh Water	1966	80,930,850	
2	Llyn Brianne		Powys	Dŵr Cymru Welsh Water	1972	64,400,000	
3	Llyn Brenig		Denbighshire	Dŵr Cymru Welsh Water	1975	61,500,000	
4	Lake Vyrnwy		Powys	Hafren Dyfrdwy	1892	59,666,000	
5	Clywedog Reservoir (Llyn Clywedog)		Powys	Dwr Cymru Welsh Water	1967	50,000,000	
6	Claerwen		Powys	Dŵr Cymru Welsh Water	1952	48,694,000	
7	Caban Coch		Powys	Dŵr Cymru Welsh Water	1904	35,531,000	
8	Llyn Trawsfynydd		Gwynedd	Magnox Ltd	1991	33,190,000	
9	Nant-y-moch Reservoir		Ceredigion	Statkraft	1962	32,564,000	
10	Llandegfedd Reservoir		Monmouthshire	Dŵr Cymru Welsh Water	1963	24,466,000	
11	Llyn Tegid (Bala Lake)		Gwynedd	Natural Resources Wales	1956	21,878,121	
12	Pontsticill Reservoir		Powys / Merthyr Tydfil	Dŵr Cymru Welsh Water	1927	15,640,000	
13	Alwen Reservoir		Conwy	Dŵr Cymru Welsh Water	1918	14,564,200	
14	Usk Reservoir		Carmarthenshire / Powys	Dŵr Cymru Welsh Water	1955	12,253,000	
15	Talybont Reservoir		Powys	Dŵr Cymru Welsh Water	1959	11,668,000	
16	Llyn Cowlyd		Conwy	RWE	1920	9,430,000	
17	Craig Goch Dam		Powys	Dŵr Cymru Welsh Water	1904	9220000	
18	Llyn Alaw		Anglesey	Dŵr Cymru Welsh Water	1966	7,638,000	
19	Marchlyn Mawr		Gwynedd	First Hydro Company	2007	6,700,000	
20	Pen-y-garreg		Powys	Dŵr Cymru Welsh Water	1904	6,046,000	

== Supply ==
Dŵr Cymru Welsh Water is the water and sewerage company that supplies most of Wales and also supplies some bordering areas of England. Dŵr Cymru supplies over three million people. Since 2001, Dŵr Cymru has been owned by Glas Cymru, which is a one purpose company that manages and finances Dŵr Cymru as a "company limited by guarantee". It does not have any shareholders, and financial surpluses are reinvested into the company.

The areas of Wales previously served by Severn Trent and Dee Valley in north east Wales were merged after Dee Valley Water was bought by Severn Trent in 2017 for £84 million. Hafren Dyfrdwy (owned by Severn Trent) replaced these areas in 2018 and is aligned with the national border, serving 115,000 people in Wales.

== Reservoir floodings ==
In 1891, the village of Llanwddyn was flooded to supply water to Liverpool by damming of the River Vyrnwy. The reservoir became the largest man made reservoir in Europe.

In 1964, residents of the small community of Aberbiga, composed of six farms, including Gronwen, Eblid, Ystradynod, Pen y Rhynau and Bwlch y Gle were evicted from their homes to create the Clywedog reservoir to supply the English midlands. Among those evicted were the parents of harpist Elinor Bennett and family of the tenor Aled Wyn Davies. There were protests against the flooding at the time.

In the early 1960s, 70 people were forced to leave their homes in Capel Celyn before the whole valley was flooded, and the Llyn Celyn reservoir built to supply water to Liverpool, England, 60 miles (95 km) away. Birmingham Corporation had one hundred occupants moved out of their homes in the Elan Valley, Powys, to build the reservoirs.

=== Water supply to England ===
In total, up to 243 billion litres of water can be supplied from Wales to England annually. Water from Elan Valley is supplied to Birmingham, while water from Lake Vyrnwy is supplied to Cheshire and Liverpool. Welsh Water is licensed to give 133 billion litres annually from Elan Valley reservoirs to Severn Trent customers. United Utilities is able to take up to 252 million litres daily from Lake Vyrnwy in Powys (owned by Severn Trent) and 50 million litres daily from the River Dee.

In 2022, Professor Roger Falconer said that England should "pay for the water", with the revenue being invested back into local communities in Wales. He added, "We would supply directly under drought conditions to the south east of England and I would see this as the oil of Wales for the future in terms of revenue."

Former lecturer at Swansea University, John Ball has suggested that Welsh water is supplied to England is worth around £2bn annually. It has also been estimated that a low extraction fee of 0.1p per litre could generate £400 million for Wales.

==== Further supplies to England ====
In 2022, John Armitt said that English water companies did not want to build new reservoirs which can be unpopular with communities. He added that Severn Trent (owner of Hafren Dyfrdwy) and Thames Water were discussing water supply from Wales to southern England, including water from Lake Vyrnwy supplied via pipes or canal to the Thames Basin.

In February 2023, Powys council said it had written to the Welsh Government and UK government about permission to raise tax on water supplies to England. Jane Dodds, leader of the Welsh Liberal Democrats, stated that she was "totally behind" the council's proposal plans, adding that they are a "step in the right direction".

In March 2023, United Utilities, Severn Trent Water and Thames Water were reportedly planning new pipeline for supply of up to 155million litres of water per day from Lake Vyrnwy in Powys to south east England.

== Responsibility ==
=== Devolution ===
The Government of Wales Act 2006 (GoWA 2006) devolved multiple Water industry powers to the then Welsh Assembly. These powers included water supply, management of water resources including reservoirs, water quality, consumer representation, management of flood risk and coastal protection.

The GoWA 2006 was changed by the Wales Act 2017 which includes devolution of water and sewerage powers as recommended by the Silk Commission.

The secretary of state for Wales' intervention powers over cross-border water matters were repealed and replaced by the water protocol in 2018.

=== Natural Resources Wales ===
The management of reservoir water quality and water resources are the responsibility of Natural Resources Wales in so far as they relate to the relevant abstraction licences and the agreed drawn down arrangements. Issues relating to the water industry in general are devolved to the Senedd. This is however subject to the reservations in Schedule 7A to the Government of Wales Act 2006 (GoWA 2006).

Natural Resources Wales is responsible for managing water resources in Wales and is the regulatory body for this purpose. On 1 April 2013, Natural Resources Wales took over the responsibilities of the Countryside Council for Wales, Environment Agency Wales and the Forestry Commission Wales. The Welsh government has decided not to pursue deregulation of the water industry, except for large industrial users that consume over 50 million litres of water annually.

== River regulation ==
River regulation reservoirs may play a role in winter flood mitigation. Operational rules may prescribe a maximum water height at the end of Autumn to ensure that the reservoir can absorb any extreme winter rainfall events in the uplands thus mitigating high flows downstream, the Clywedog Reservoir performs this function on the River Severn. River regulation reservoirs are marginally cheaper to construct since there is no requirement for a take-off tower or associated large volume pipe-work or aqueducts piercing the dam wall. However a number of such reservoirs have installed hydro-electric generating sets to extract power from the released water. Examples of river regulation reservoirs include Llyn Brianne on the River Towy and Llyn Celyn and Llyn Brenig on the River Dee.

Proposals in the past have also included complex inter-river transfer schemes with, in one case, the enlargement of Craig Goch reservoir, the release of water into the River Severn via the Afon Elan and then a pumped transfer into the headwaters of the River Thames.

== Safety and failures ==
It was, in part, the failure of the Llyn Eigiau dam, and consequent collapse of the dam of a second reservoir (Coedty) downstream, in the then Caernarvonshire (modern Gwynedd) in 1925 with the loss of 16 lives in the village of Dolgarrog which led to the enactment of the Reservoirs (Safety Provisions) Act in 1930. Under this legislation, all reservoir owners in Wales and England were required to have them inspected by a suitably qualified civil engineer, if the capacity exceeded five million gallons (22,700 cubic metres). The Reservoirs Act of 1975 placed further duties upon both owners and local authorities in respect of the safety of those with a capacity of more than 25,000 cubic metres. The Environment Agency assumed safety responsibilities in September 2004 and Natural Resources Wales became the responsible environmental body in 2013.

== Hydroelectric energy ==
The Rheidol hydropower plant is the largest hydropowerplant of its kind in Wales. It has generated renewable energy since 1962, using rainfall from the nearby mountains. The plant includes a combination of reservoirs, dams, pipelines, aqueducts and power stations, over 162 square kilometres producing around 85 GWh annually which can power around 12,350 homes. The Ffestiniog Power Station opened in Gwynedd in 1963, and Dinorwig pumped hydro plant was commissioned in 1984. Ffestiniog power station produces 360 MW while Dinorwig produces 1.7 GW.

Since 2014 Natural Resources Wales (NRW) have enabled developers and small community groups to build 15 small scale hydro schemes in Wales. NRW have also finished building the 17 kW Garwnant small scale hydro scheme in 2017.

== See also ==
- List of lakes of Wales
