= Natural resources of Wales =

Overview of natural resources in Wales

Relief map of Wales

The natural resources of Wales have contributed substantially to the economic wealth of the United Kingdom from pre-Roman times to the present. Wales has a complex and varied geology with a wealth of natural minerals. Although Wales has been strongly associated with the coal industry, it has also been the world's leading supplier of slate and of copper at different times. The country lies along the western side of Great Britain and is buffeted by the prevailing South-Westerly trade winds which bring year round rain and wind but also maintain an equable temperate climate. The combination of climate and physical geography and geology have given rise to many different types of landscape and biomes rich in species variety.

== Water ==
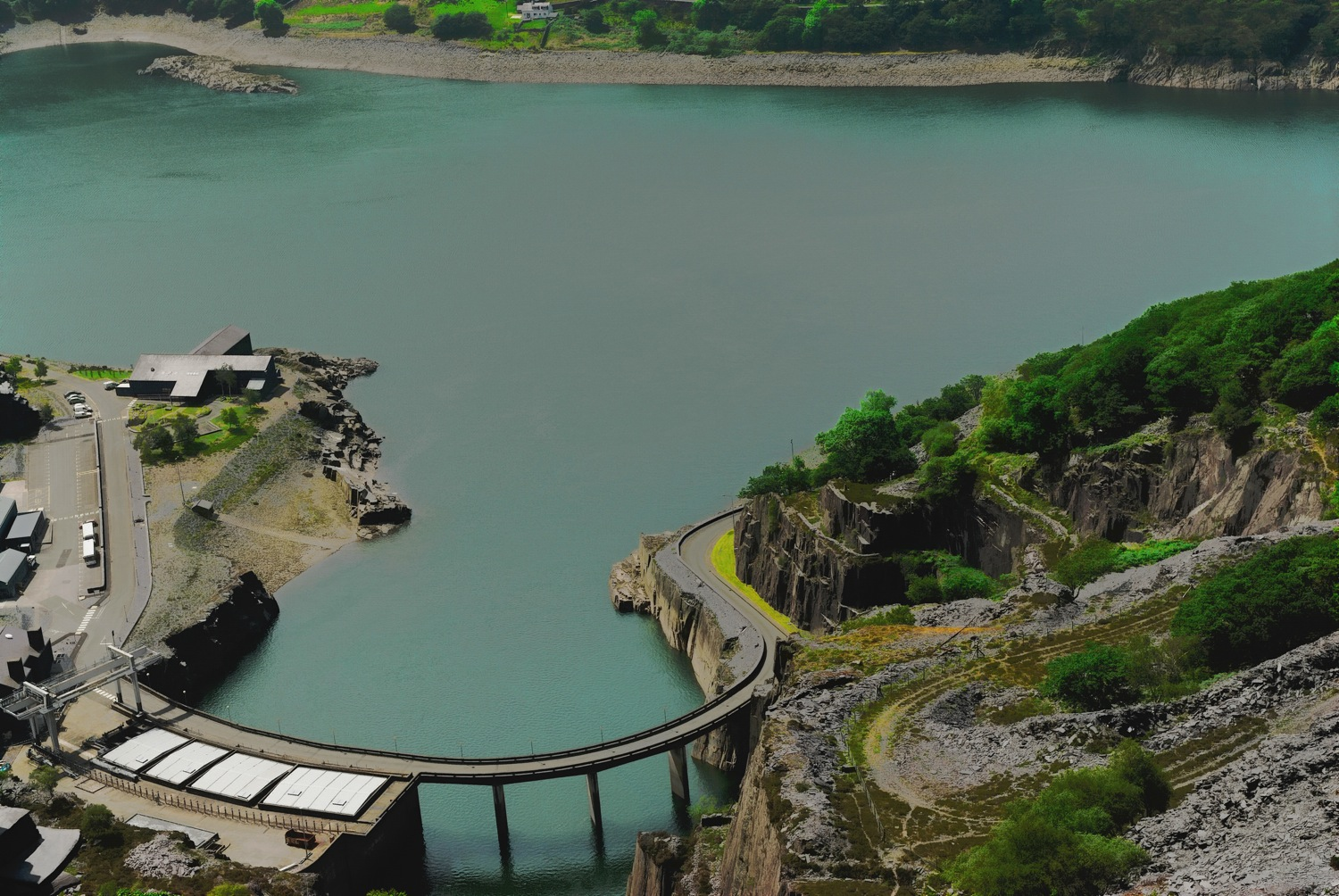
The Dinorwig Power Station lower reservoir, a 1,800 MW pumped-storage hydroelectric scheme, one of the largest such schemes in Europe

With its mountainous terrain and ample rainfall, water is one of Wales's most abundant resources. The largest group of reservoirs, are in the Elan Valley and include Claerwen. Other notable bodies of water include Llyn Tegid (Bala Lake), Llyn Trawsfynydd, Lake Vyrnwy, Talybont Reservoir and Llyn Brianne.

The source of many significant rivers are located in the Welsh mountains including the River Dee, River Teifi, River Towy, River Wye, and River Severn all of which have significant fisheries especially of Salmon and Sea trout.

== Renewable energy ==
Wind is another resource that Wales has in abundance. The Gwynt y Môr is one of several offshore wind farms off the coast of North Wales and Anglesey, and is the second largest such wind farm in the world. Other wind farms are found on inland, mostly upland sites, but there are none in the Snowdonia and Brecon Beacons national parks.

== Coal ==
The South Wales Coalfield extends from parts of Pembrokeshire and Carmarthenshire in the west, to Blaenau Gwent and Torfaen in the east, and the rather smaller North Wales Coalfield underlies parts of Flintshire and Denbighshire. Vast quantities of coal were mined in Wales during the Industrial Revolution and the earlier part of the twentieth century, after which coal stocks dwindled and the remaining pits became uneconomical as foreign coal became available at low prices. The last deep pit in Wales closed in 2008.

== Metal ores ==
Ironstone outcrops along the northern edge of the South Wales Coalfield were extensively worked for the production of iron and were important in the initiation of the Industrial Revolution in South Wales.

Lead, silver and to a lesser extent zinc were mined in the upland areas of the rivers Ystwyth and Rheidol and in the headwaters of the River Severn for centuries and smaller deposits were also mined at Pentre Halkyn in Flintshire during the Roman occupation of Britain. There were also ore-bearing sites in Clwyd where lead, silver and sometimes zinc were mined. Manganese, titanium and numerous other minerals occur in various parts of Wales. Gold is found in southern Snowdonia and at Dolaucothi.

Copper was a major export from Parys Mountain on Anglesey which was, at its height, the largest copper mine in the world. Copper had been known about and mined since at least the Bronze Age with a sophisticated Bronze Age copper mine on the Great Orme near Llandudno. Smaller copper deposits were worked in Snowdonia which had a flourishing copper industry from the early 1800s. Although exploited in the past, none of these minerals is mined on a commercial scale today.

== Stone ==
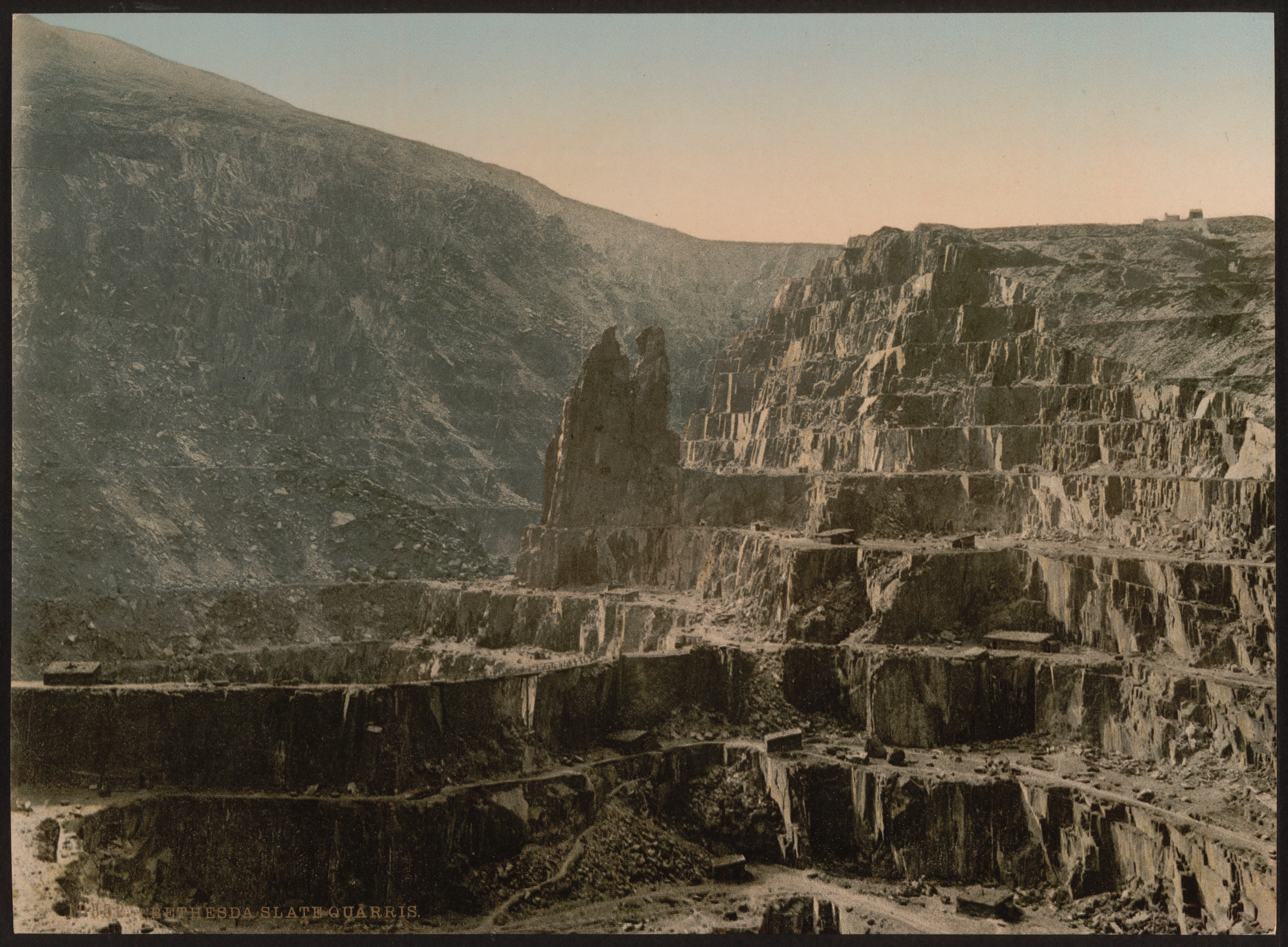
Penrhyn Quarry in about 1900

Stone is quarried in various parts of Wales, and slate quarrying and mining has been a major industry in North Wales. The Cilgwyn Quarry was being worked in the 12th century, but later Blaenau Ffestiniog became the centre of production. The Penrhyn Quarry is still producing slates, though at a reduced capacity compared to its heyday, and the Llechwedd Slate Caverns have been converted into a visitor attraction. Several of the railways that used to carry the slates to the ports have been restored as tourist attractions, including the Ffestiniog Railway and the Talyllyn Railway.

== Oil and gas ==
Wales has some potential for the onshore production of oil and gas. Shale gas may be obtained by fracking and there is methane in unmined coal seams that may be extractable. Another potential source of gas is the underground controlled combustion of coal seams to produce syngas, a mixture of hydrogen, methane and carbon monoxide.

== Natural environment ==
The three national parks of Wales

Partly because of its relatively sparse population in Mid and North Wales, its unusually equable climate and its complex geology, Wales sustains a great variety of notable landscape forms, unusual biomes and areas enjoying special protection because of their natural environmental value. It is home to a number of National Nature Reserves (NNRs), sites of special scientific interest (SSSIs), five areas of outstanding natural beauty (AONBs) and three national parks

Wales has many protected areas including three national parks: Snowdonia, Brecon Beacons and Pembrokeshire Coast. It has five Areas of Outstanding Natural Beauty; Anglesey, the Clwydian Range and Dee Valley, the Gower Peninsula, the Llŷn Peninsula, and the Wye Valley.

The Gower Peninsula was the first area in the United Kingdom to be designated as an Area of Outstanding Natural Beauty, in 1956.

== Sea and coast ==
Because of its location facing into a very energetic ocean, Wales has numerous sandy beaches, a coastline rich in sea-cliffs and a relatively high tidal range in many areas. As of 2020, the coastline of Wales has 40 Blue Flag beaches, three Blue Flag marinas and one Blue Flag boat operator. A significant tourism industry has developed to advantage of these coastal resources including substantial caravan parks along the north-east coast at Rhyl, Prestatyn and Kimnel Bay in parts of Pembrokeshire and along the south coast at Porthcawl and Barry

A number of westerly and south-westerly facing beaches have well-developed sand-dune system behind them including Kenfig dunes, Merthyr Mawr, Morfa Harlech and Newborough Warren all of which are highly valued for their wild-life diversity including the presence of some rare plant and animal species such as the Fen orchid.
