= Afon Gwyrfai =

River in Gwynedd, Wales

Afon Gwyrfai River Gwyrfai
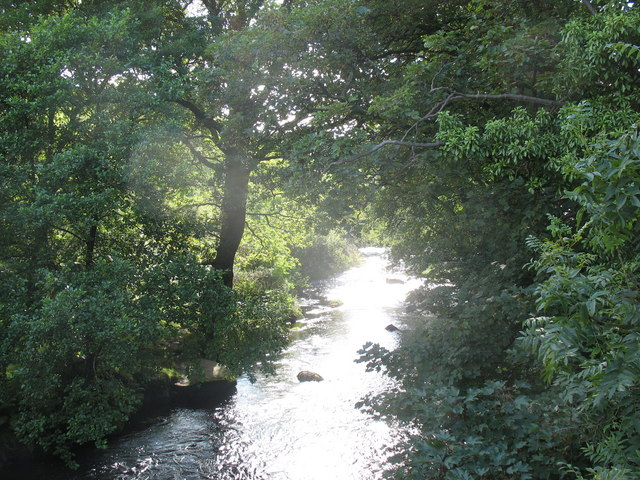
- Afon Gwyrfai from Pont Cyrnant

Location
- Sovereign state: United Kingdom
- Country: Wales
- Principal area: Gwynedd

Physical characteristics
- Source
  - location: Llyn y Gader (Llyn y Gadair)
- Mouth
  - location: Foryd Bay
  - coordinates: 53°06′24″N 4°18′39″W

Afon Gwyrfai is a short river in Gwynedd, Wales, flowing for half of its length through Snowdonia National Park. Exiting Llyn y Gader it flows north through the small village of Rhyd-ddu to enter the southeastern end of Llyn Cwellyn. Downstream of the lake it flows northwest past Betws Garmon, leaving the national park and continues to the southern edge of Waunfawr. It then turns slightly west to flow on to Bontnewydd beyond which it turns slightly south to enter Foryd Bay (Y Foryd). The tidal channel within the bay flows north into the western end of the Menai Strait.

Principal tributary streams include Afon Treweunydd which contributes water from the reservoir of Llyn Ffynnon-y-gwas and from the lakes of Llyn Glas, Llyn Coch and Llyn Nadroedd in Cwm Clogwyn immediately west of the summit of Snowdon. The tidal channel of Afon Gwyrfai within Foryd Bay also accepts the flow of the left bank tributaries, Afon Foryd, Afon Rhyd and Afon Carrog. The river is shadowed by the line of the Welsh Highland Railway for much of its length, and by which it is crossed four times.

The name may signify the '(river of) curved places', referencing its meandering course.
