= Pen-y-fan Pond =

Reservoir in South Wales

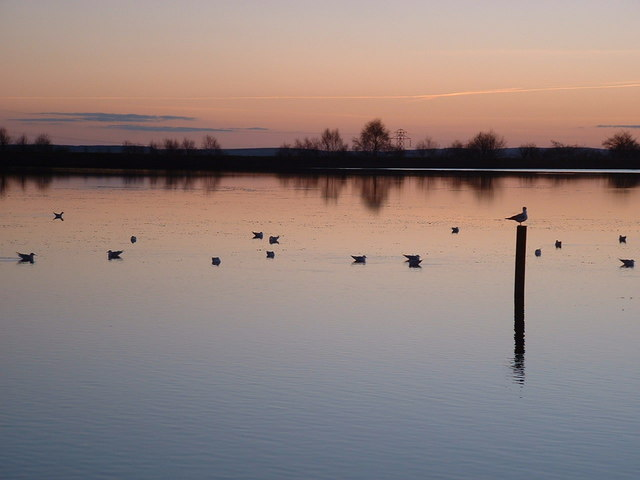

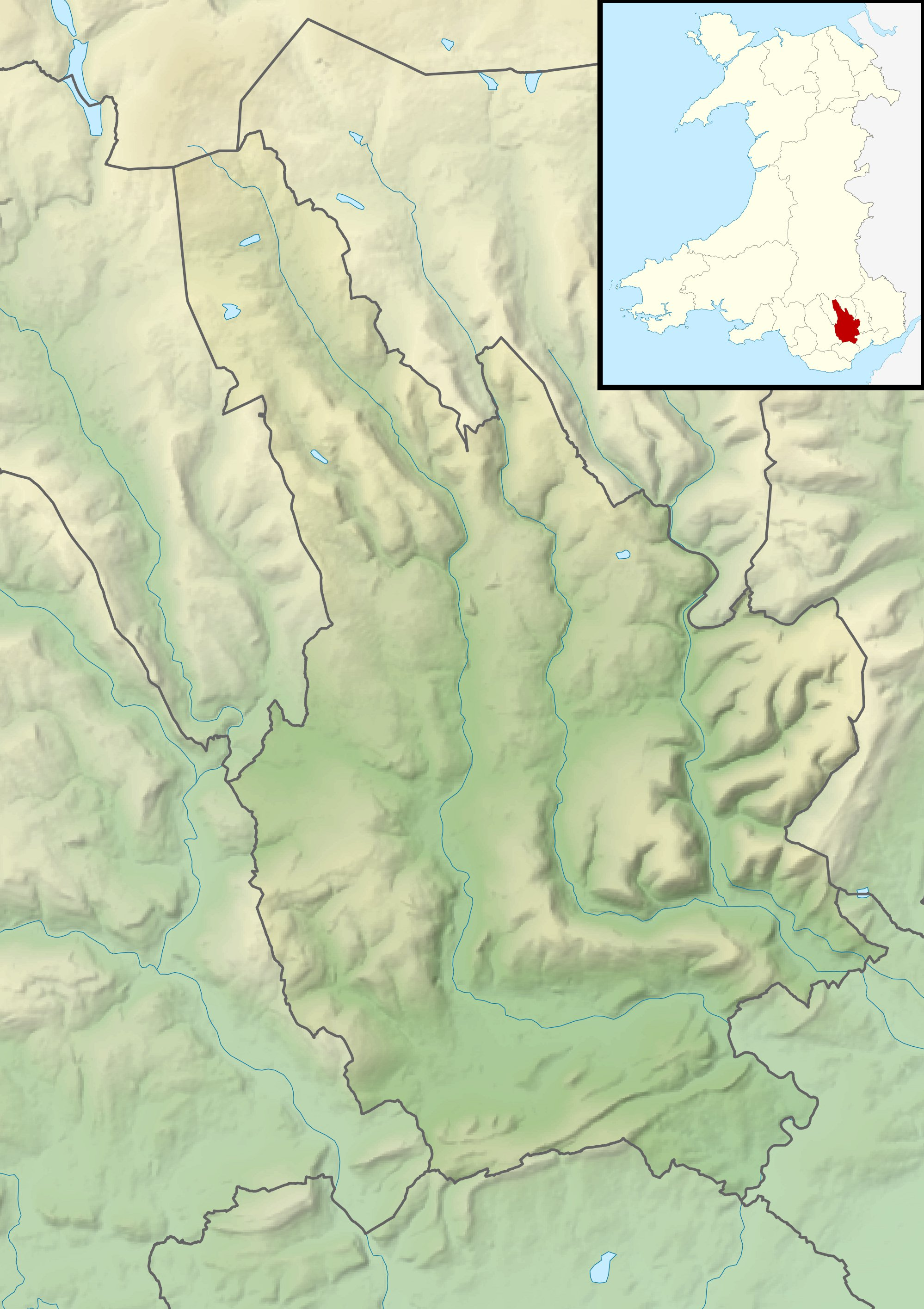
- Location within Caerphilly
- Location: South Wales
- Coordinates: 51.6979°N 3.1641°W
- Type: reservoir
- Catchment area: Sirhowy River
- Basin countries: United Kingdom
- Surface area: 6.7 ha (17 acres)
- Surface elevation: 1,000 feet (300 m)

Pen-y-fan Pond is a man-made reservoir in South Wales built around 1794-6 as part of the engineering works for the Crumlin Arm of the Monmouthshire Canal. The reservoir was used to maintain the water level in the canal.

The reservoir is formed by a large earth dam with stone facings, forming banks on three sides of a gentle slope. The outlet to the canal feeder forms a stone-lined, oval tunnel and a valve chamber is set into the bank above.

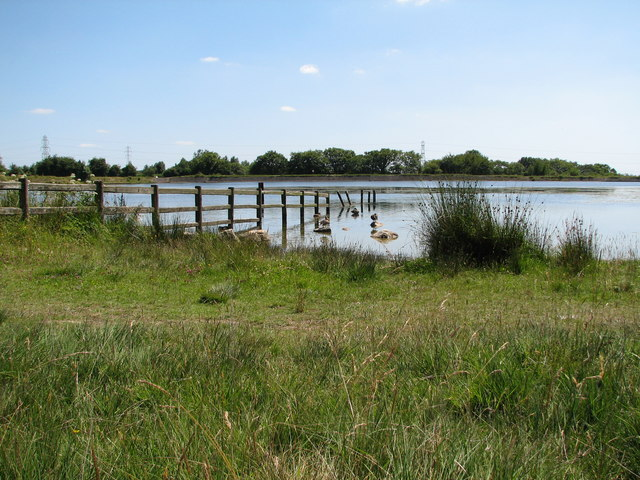
Northern shore of Pen-y-fan Pond in 2006

Pen Y Fan Pond Country Park features the reservoir, and provides a circular walk around the lake, and minimal facilities for visitors. The site has a car park, and is popular destination for families and fishermen. Fisherman may purchase day tickets from the Islwyn & District Angling club's website: http://www.islwynanglers.com
