= Afon Llyfni =

River in North Wales

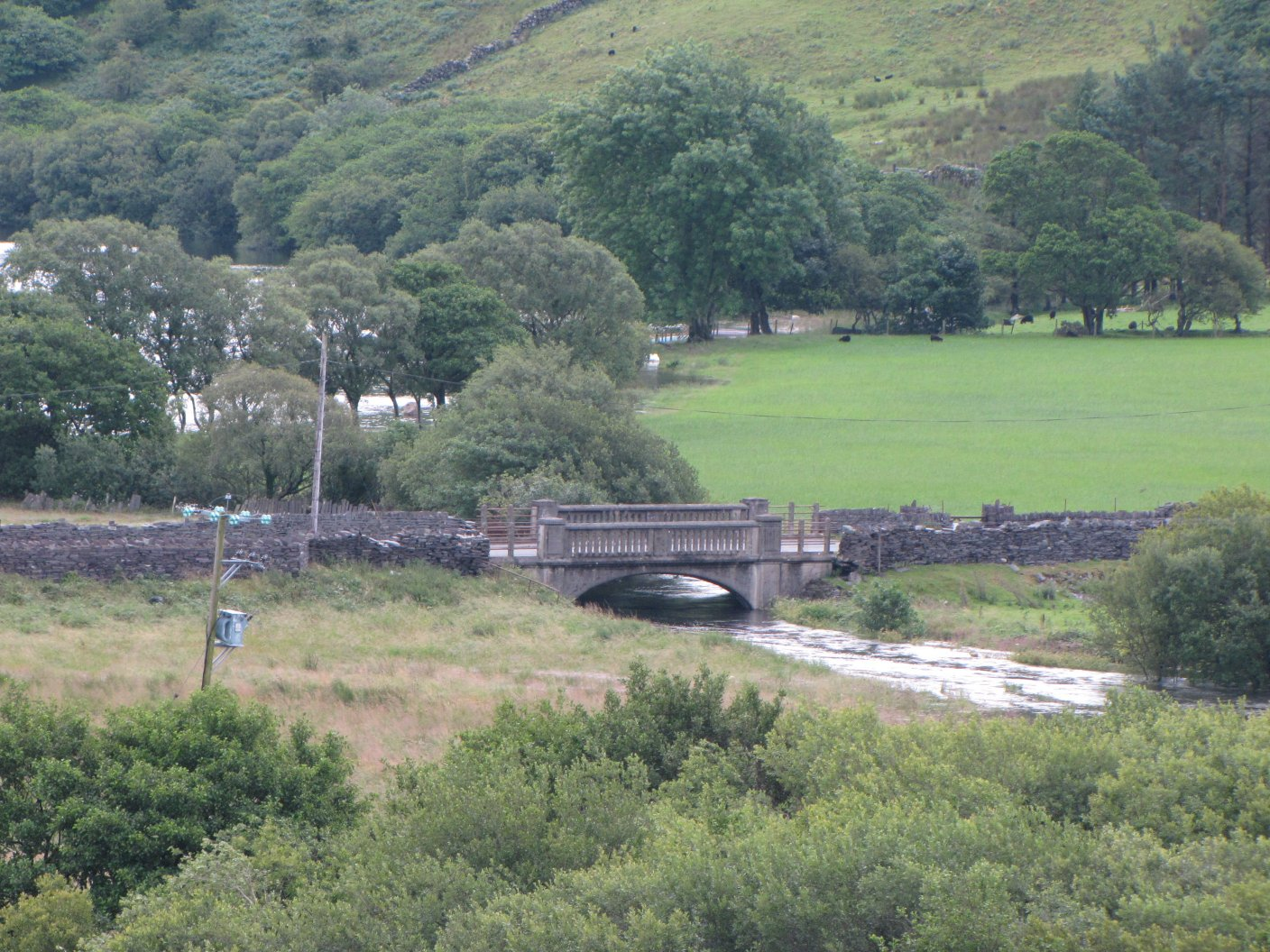
- Afon Llyfni at the outflow of Llyn Nantlle Uchaf

- Location within Wales

Location
- Country: Wales
- Region: North Wales
- County: Gwynedd

Physical characteristics
- Source: Llyn Nantlle Uchaf
- Mouth: Irish Sea
  - location: Pontllyfni
  - coordinates: 53.04952°N 4.33874°W

The Afon Llyfni is a small river in North Wales which arises as Nant Drws y Coed between Mynydd Mawr and Mynydd Drws-y-Coed just to the west of Snowdon.

The main river forms at the outlet of the Llyn Nantlle Uchaf and flows past the great slate workings of Nantlle picking up drainage from the very deep flooded quarries.

It then passes to the south of Talysarn and Penygroes before eventually discharging to the sea at Pontllyfni.

For a number of years there were concerns that the quality of the river might be polluted because of illegal and historical dumping of industrial waste in one of the deep, water-filled quarries. However, it appears that there has been little or no detectable quality shift.
