= Llyn Elsi =

Lake in Snowdonia, North Wales

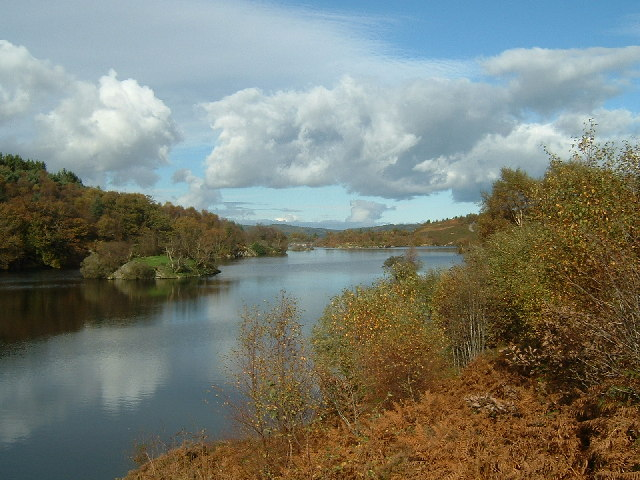

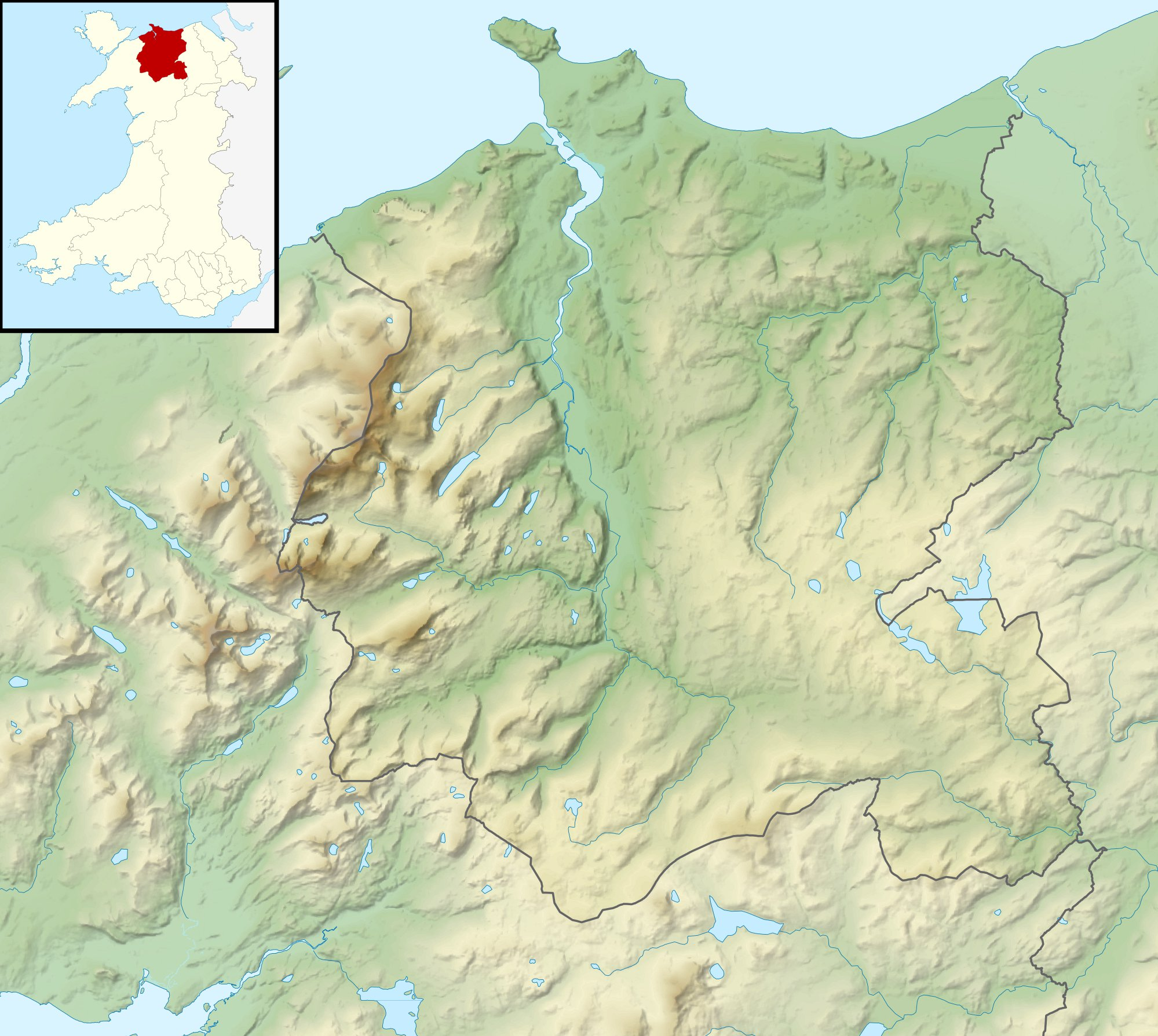
- Location within Conwy
- Location: Snowdonia National Park, North Wales
- Coordinates: 53°4′48″N 3°49′6″W
- Type: former natural lake, reservoir
- Basin countries: United Kingdom
- Surface area: 30 acres (12 ha)
- Max. depth: 31 ft (9.4 m)
- Islands: 1

Llyn Elsi is a lake located above the village of Betws-y-coed in the Snowdonia National Park in North Wales. It is a reservoir providing water for the village.

There is a path round the lake, which affords good views to the north-west towards the mountain ranges of the Carneddau and the Glyderau. Snowdon, the highest mountain in Wales, is not visible behind Moel Siabod. The lake is more than 700 ft above sea level, and has a small island.

The 20 ft dam was built in 1914, but even so the lake only has a maximum depth of approximately 9 metres. Prior to this the lake was two smaller lakes, called Llyn Rhisgog and Llyn Enoc. A memorial at the northern end of the lake commemorates the fact that Lord Ancaster permitted the building of the dam and the use of the lake as a water supply.

In 1946 black-headed gulls established a colony at the lake, causing concern over pollution to the water supply.

The lake is kept stocked with various types of trout by the local angling club.

Llyn Elsi can be reached on foot by various paths, one starting behind St. Mary's church in the village.
