= Foryd Bay =

Bay in Gwynedd, Wales

Coordinates: 53.1129°N 4.3201°W

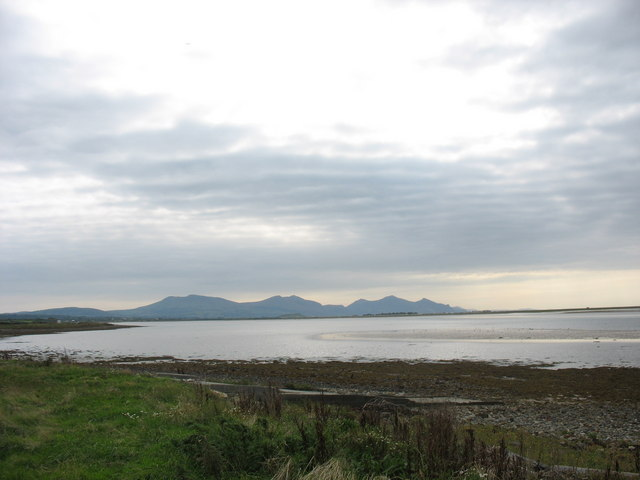
View towards the southern end of the bay.

Foryd Bay, or Y Foryd (Welsh for 'the estuary' / 'the inlet'), is a tidal bay in Gwynedd, Wales. It is located at the south-western end of the Menai Strait, about two miles south-west of Caernarfon. Several rivers flow into the bay and there are large areas of mudflats and salt marsh. A shingle spit partly blocks the mouth of the bay. At the north-western end is Fort Belan, built during the 18th century.

Aerial photography in the drought of 2018 identified rectangular structures possibly of Roman age, at Glan y Mor, on slightly raised ground adjacent to the shoreline. This layout is very unusual in Roman Wales; it is rectilinear but has no defences and is otherwise unlike the military Roman sites in Wales, nor does it resemble the native defended settlements with their roundhouses and irregular outlines, nor the occasional villas. It is similar to the buildings and ditched enclosures excavated on the other side of the Menai Strait at Tai Cochion. To the south is a rectangular ditched structure or possible building, with an internal subdivision, measuring 25 by 13 m. To the north is a pair of almost identical structures; both groups are linked by a linear ditch or boundary. Close by, an early field system runs north-west to south-east between Plas Farm and the shores of the Menai Strait; the fields are rectangular, with at least one visible ditched hollow way.

The bay has been designated a Site of Special Scientific Interest and in 1994 it became a Local Nature Reserve because of its importance for wildlife. Many birds visit in winter and during migration, including large numbers of wildfowl and waders such as wigeon which peak at over 3000 birds. Notable species include brent goose, jack snipe, spotted redshank and greenshank. Terns roost at the mouth of the bay.
