= Llyn Cwm Bychan =

Lake in Gwynedd, Wales

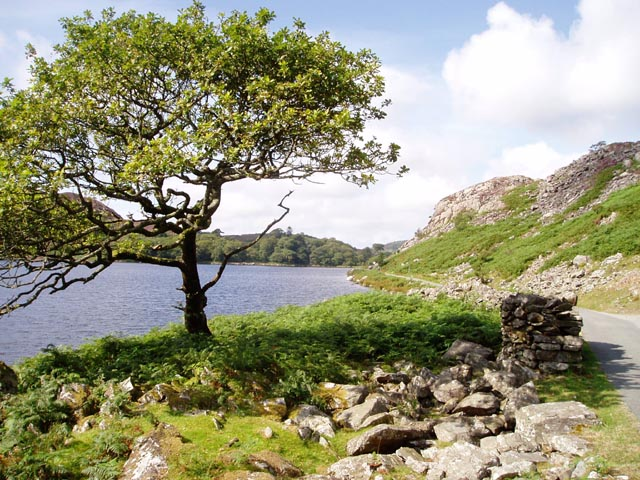
- A narrow road leads to the single farm at the head of the valley.

- Location within Gwynedd
- Location: Gwynedd, North Wales
- Coordinates: 52°51.7′N 4°1.6′W
- Lake type: natural
- Primary outflows: River Artro
- Basin countries: Wales
- Surface elevation: 180 m (590 ft)

Llyn Cwm Bychan is a lake in north Wales, and is one of the sources of the River Artro which flows south westwards through Llanbedr and onwards to the sea. It is located in the Rhinogydd mountains of Snowdonia.
