= Usk Reservoir =

Lake in Carmarthenshire and Powys, Wales

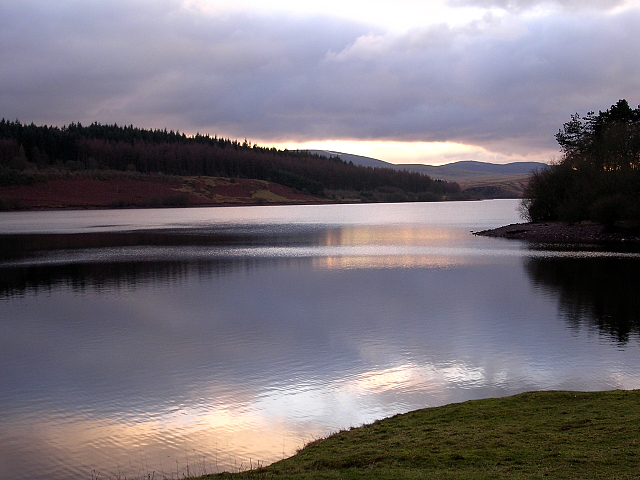

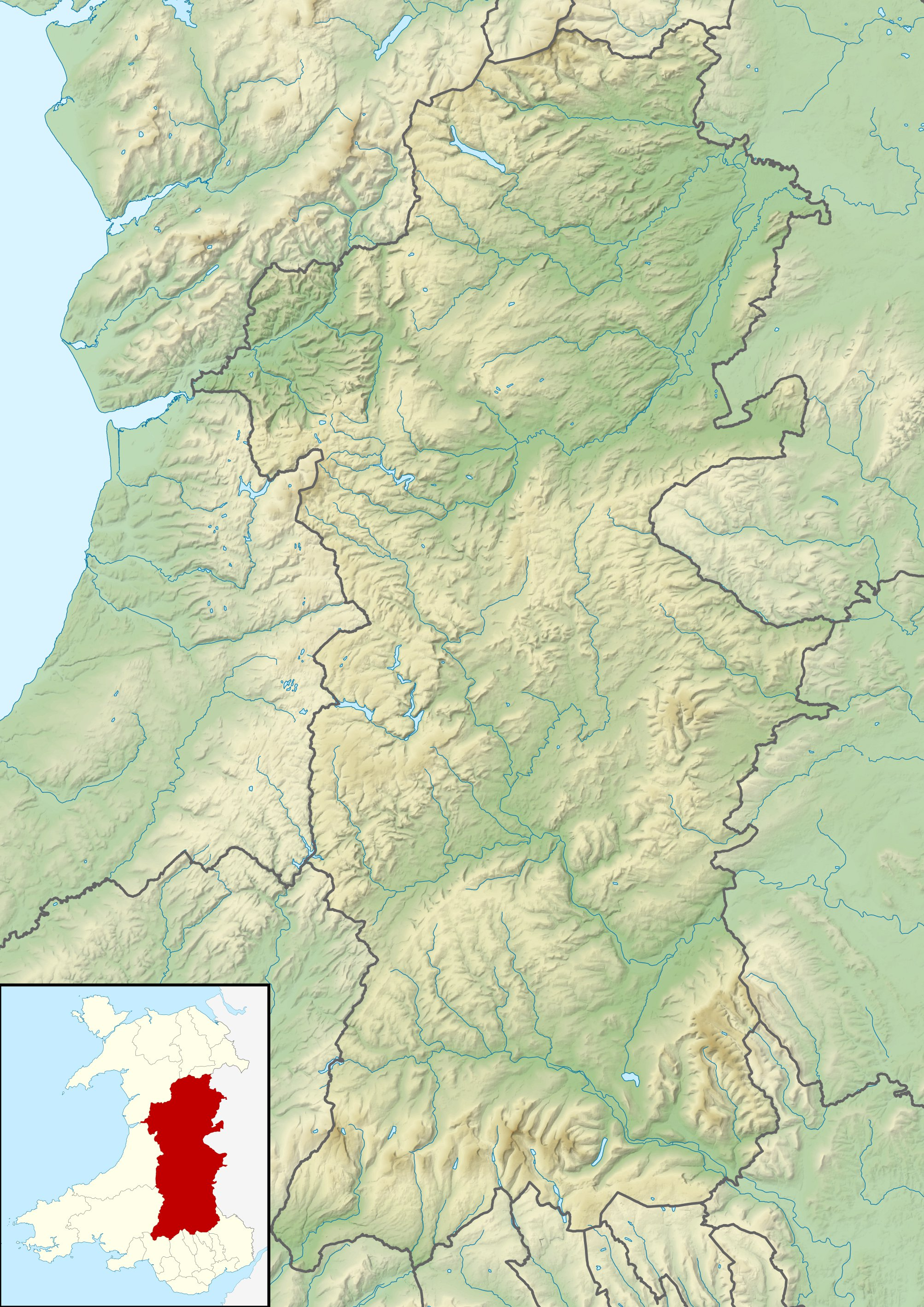
- Location within Powys
- Location: Wales
- Coordinates: 51°56′40″N 3°42′50″W
- Type: reservoir
- Primary inflows: River Usk
- Primary outflows: River Usk
- Basin countries: United Kingdom
- Surface elevation: 1,006 ft (307 m)

The Usk Reservoir (Welsh: Cronfa Wysg) is located in the upper Usk Valley, at 1,006 feet (307 m) above sea level, in the western part of the Brecon Beacons National Park, Wales. The county boundary between Carmarthenshire and Powys runs through the reservoir which lies about six miles to the north of the Black Mountain escarpment. It is an important landmark for walkers on the mountain range.

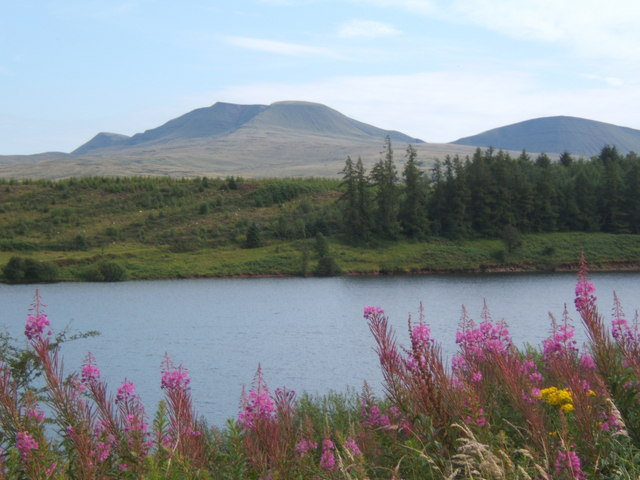
The Black Mountain range seen from the reservoir

== History ==
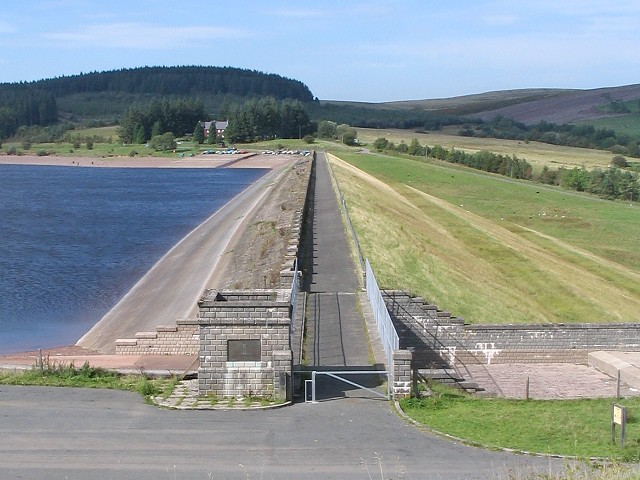
The reservoir main dam wall

Completed in 1955 by Swansea City Council, the dam is approximately 109 ft (33m) in height and 1600 ft (480m) in width. It was the first example in the UK of an earth dam with horizontal drainage blankets. The reservoir covers some 280 acres (110 ha) of land. It can be located just off the minor road between Trecastle and Llanddeusant, 7 miles (11 km) west of Sennybridge. The reservoir is now owned by Welsh Water and the surrounding forests are managed on their behalf by Natural Resources Wales. Most of the area is open to walkers and cyclists via forest tracks and other footpaths. There are several small car parks for visitors. The reservoir is stocked with freshwater fish such as trout and can be fished with an appropriate licence.
