= Llyn Goddionduon =

Lake in Conwy County Borough, Wales

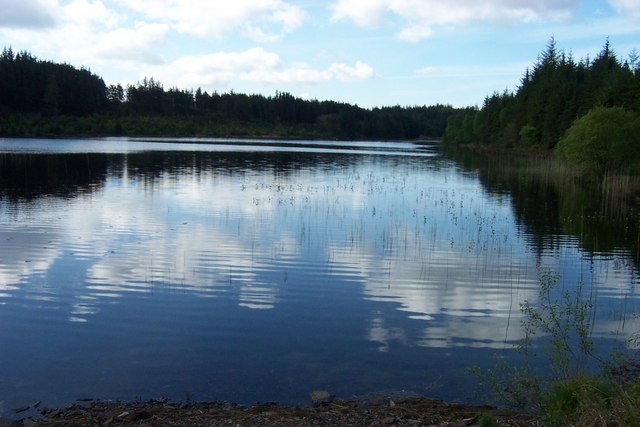
- lake shore, looking in a southerly direction

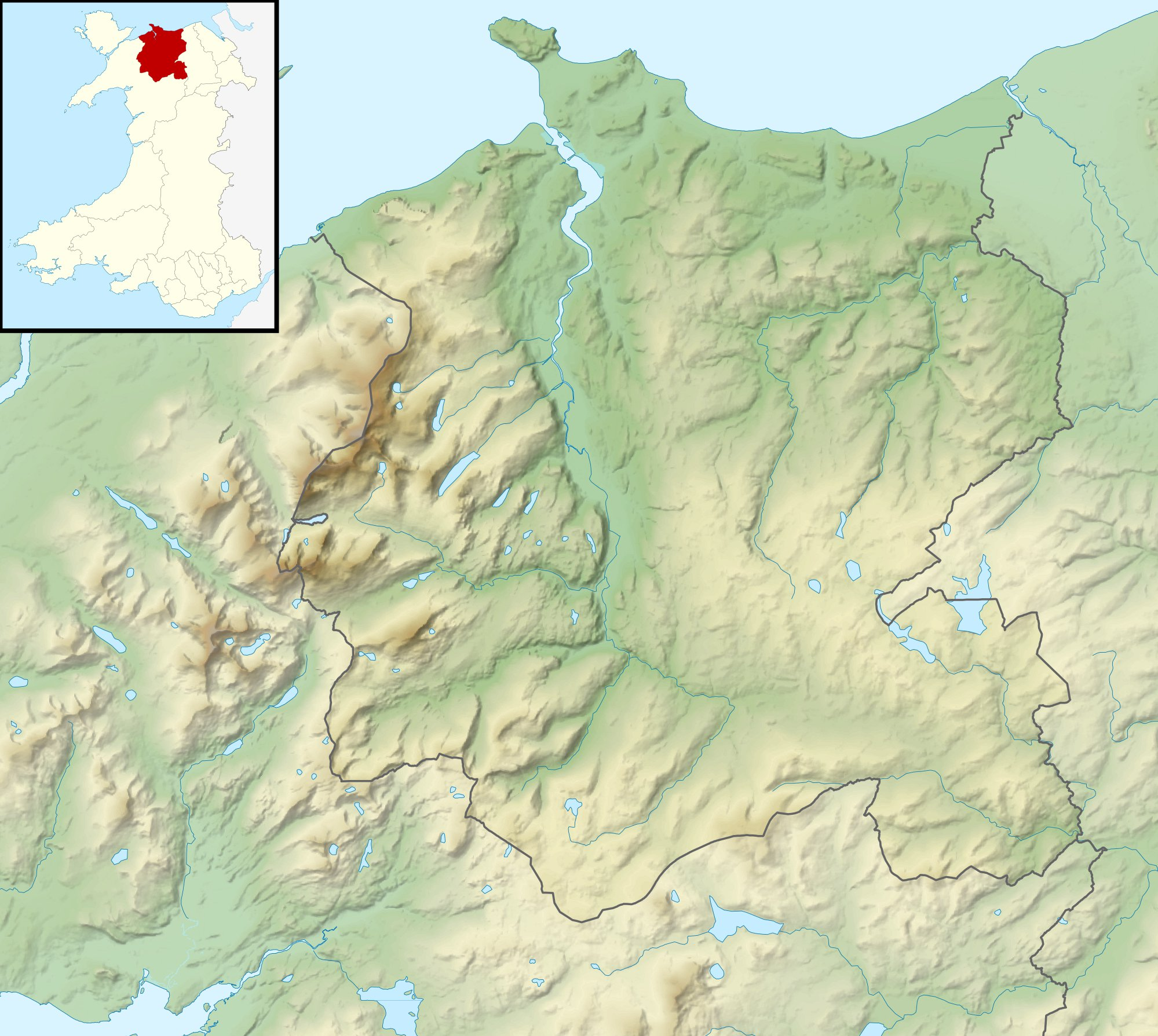
- Location within Conwy
- Location: Gwydir Forest, North Wales
- Coordinates: 53°6′36″N 3°51′49″W
- Type: natural
- Basin countries: United Kingdom
- Surface area: 10 acres (4.0 ha)
- Surface elevation: 794 ft (242 m)

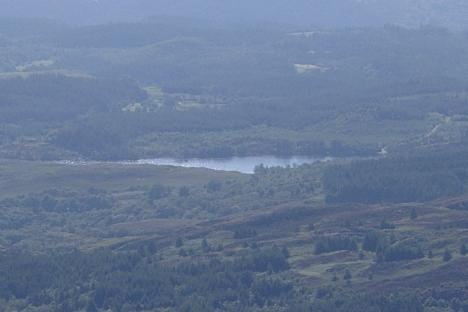
The remoteness of the lake can be seen from the summit of Creigiau Gleision, some 2½ miles away.

Llyn Goddionduon is a remote lake in the Gwydir Forest in north Wales. It lies at a height of 794 ft (242 m) and covers an area of 10 acres (40,000 m^{2}). It is totally surrounded by coniferous forest, although a track leads up to it, enabling a water supply in the event of fire, and anglers also use this path.

Short drone video of 3 lakes, including Llyn Goddionduon; 2018

It is unusual in that it is totally natural, whereas nearly all of the other lakes in the forest have been partially or totally constructed as water sources for the mines which were scattered throughout the Forest.

Some sources state that the correct name of the lake should be Llyn y Goeden (Lake of the Tree), but that an error on the maps resulted in the name Goddinduon (duon means "black" in Welsh, but Goddion is not a known word).

The lake is stocked with brown trout by the Betws-y-coed Anglers Club.

In 1890 an advert for Cobden's Hotel in Capel Curig (over a mile away) stated that this lake could be used by residents for fishing, and the Army Training Camp at Capel Curig still use the lake as a water supply.
