= Llyn Cwellyn =

Reservoir in North Wales

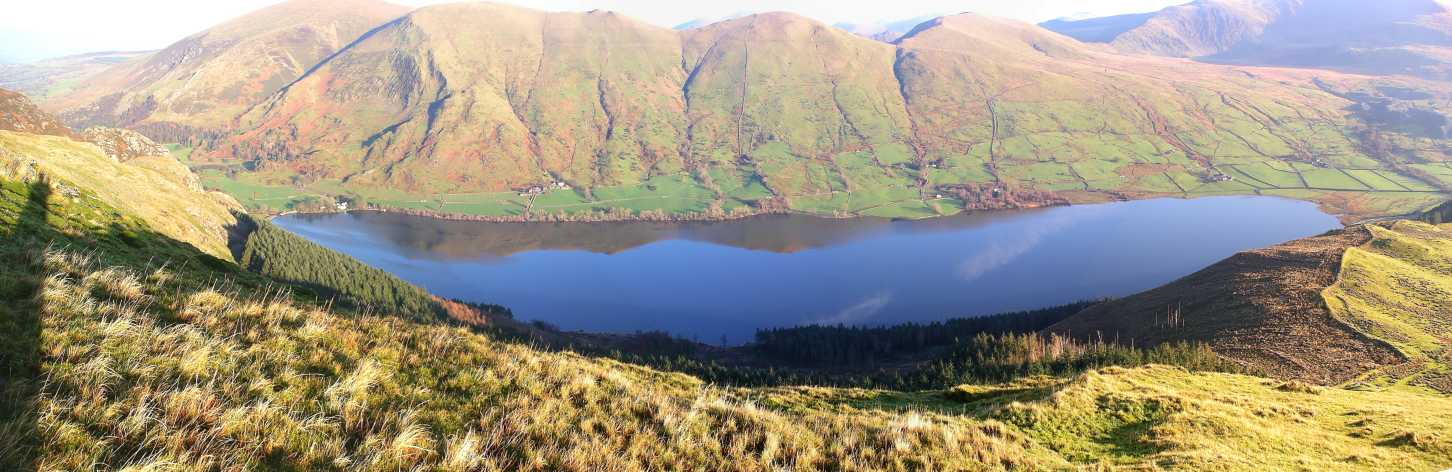
- from Mynydd Mawr

- Location within Gwynedd
- Location: North Wales
- Coordinates: 53°4′20″N 4°9′6″W
- Type: reservoir, natural lake
- Basin countries: United Kingdom
- Surface area: 215 acres (87 ha)
- Max. depth: 120 ft (37 m)
- Settlements: Rhyd Ddu

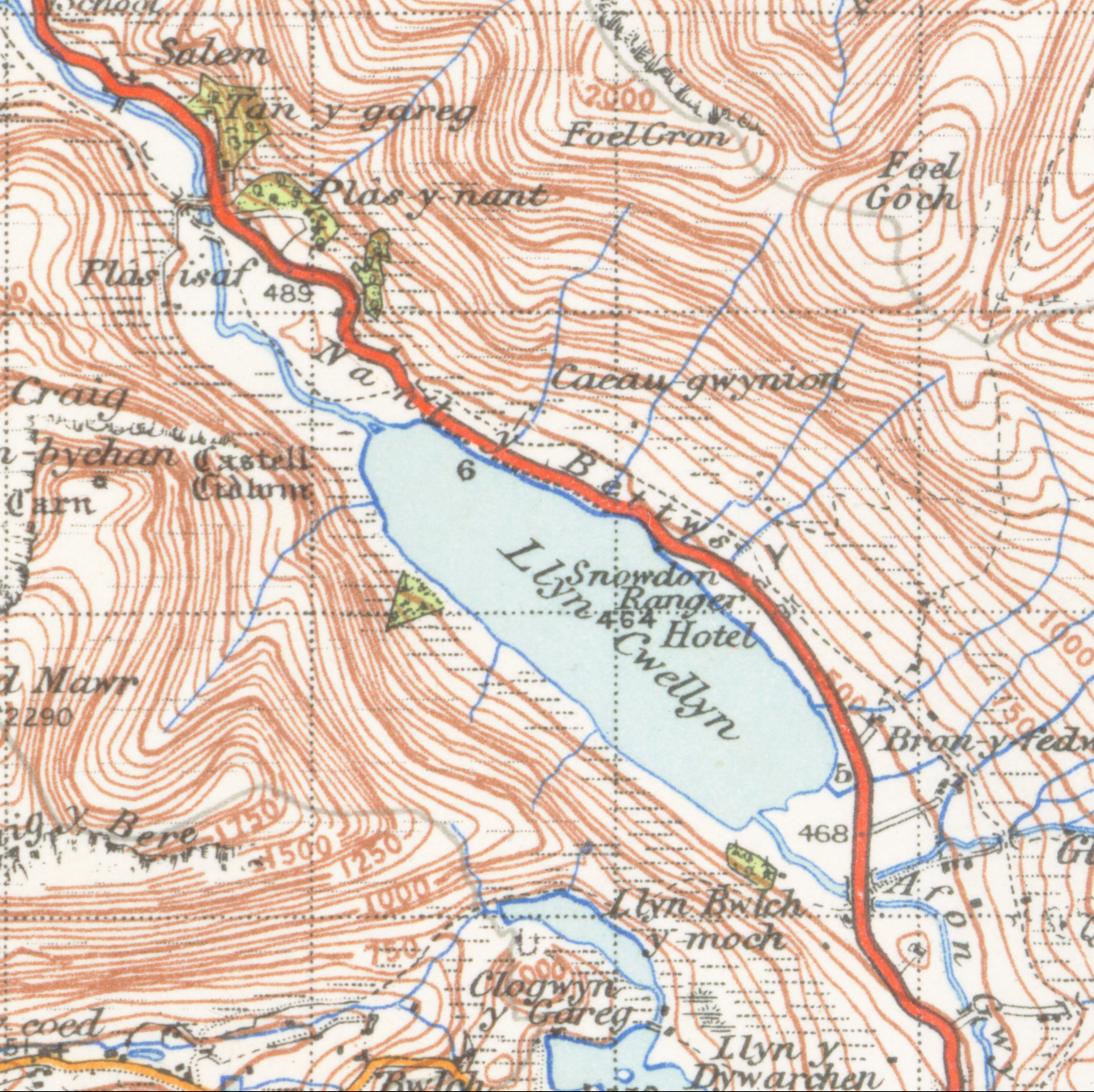
A map of the lake from 1947

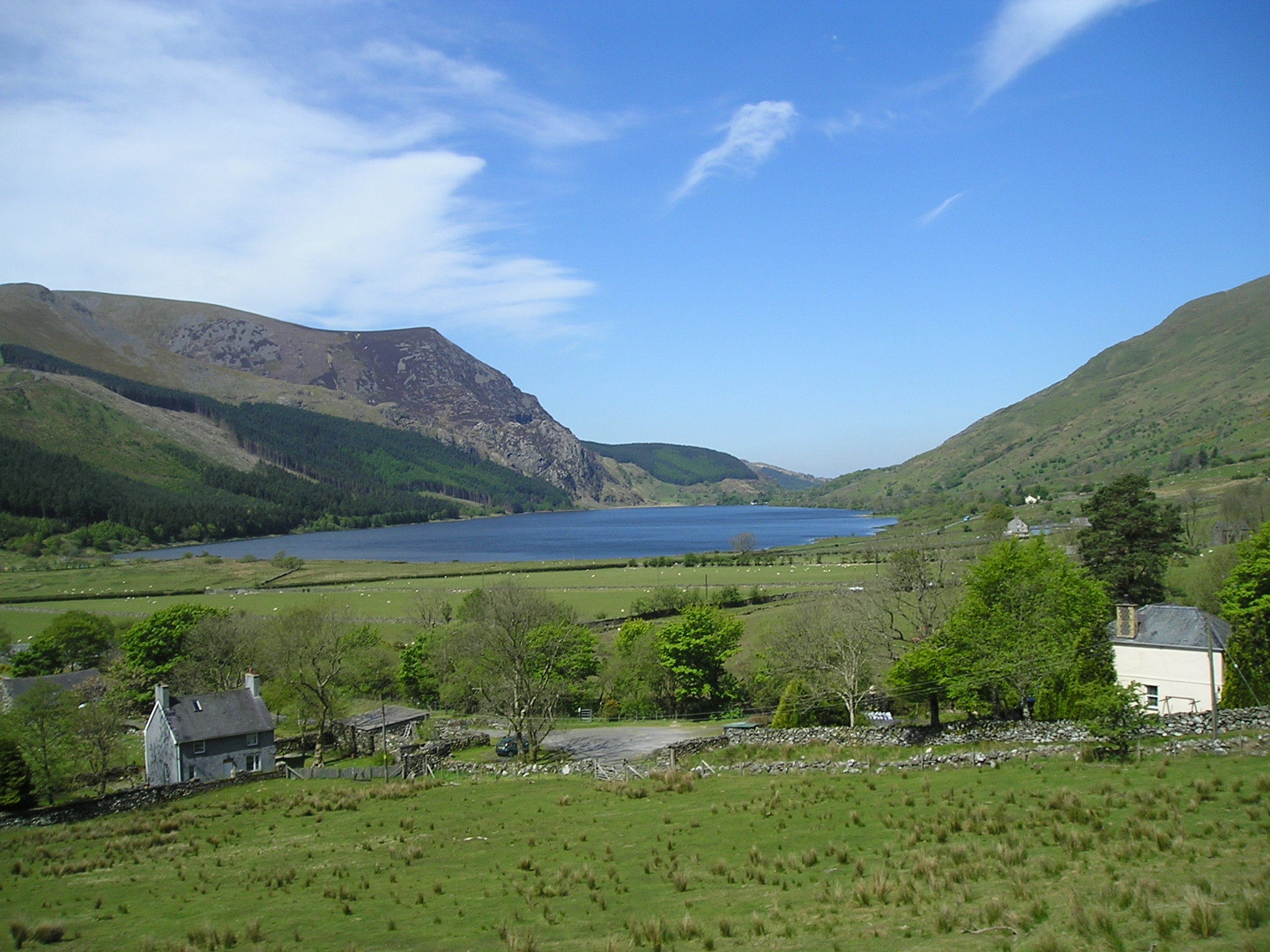
Llyn Cwellyn viewed from the Welsh Highland Railway

Llyn Cwellyn (Llyn Quellyn in some antiquated texts) is a reservoir in North Wales which supplies drinking water to parts of Gwynedd and Anglesey. It lies on Afon Gwyrfai in Nant y Betws between Moel Eilio and Mynydd Mawr in the northern part of Snowdonia National Park. It has an area of 215 acres (0.87 km^{2}), and is over 120 ft (37 m) deep. It is considered relatively oligotrophic. At the southern end is the small village of Rhyd Ddu.

Although it is now dammed at the northern end - below the Castell Cidwm ridge, near the village of Betws Garmon - this has not substantially increased the size of the natural glacial moraine lake that has existed since the last ice age. The lake is very deep and is one of the few lakes in Wales to support a natural population of Arctic char. The lake is also home to brown trout and there are otters that are regularly seen at the Castell Cidwm end. The lake has shared ownership between Lawrence Jones (businessman), owner of the Castell Cidwm estate at the northern end, and Welsh water, who own the right-hand side which supplies the weir. The lake was originally owned by the Marquis of Anglesey who used the Castell Cidwm country house as his hunting lodge.

The A4085 runs past the lake; however, there are no lay-bys for picnics and the east side is now considered a Nature Reserve, and fishing is not permitted in the tree-lined area beside the road all the way down to Castell Cidwm. Fishing permits can be purchased for Cwellyn and fly fishing anglers can expect to catch wild brown trout here, which are abundant and often found along the shoreline which has easy wading. Char and salmon can also be caught, usually from the boats available for hire from the Cwellyn hotel. This lake is particularly dangerous when paddle boarding, wild swimming or kayaking in bad weather, as fast winds come down off Snowdon and through the valley, making it hard to travel back up the lake. This lake is a reservoir and electric engines only are permitted; electric engines with 50lb thrust are quite adequate to get around the lake, even in windy conditions.

On the far side of the lake the land was planted as a commercial soft-wood forest and is now owned by Natural Resources Wales; trees are blowing over and NRW are planning a harvesting operation to remove them, working with Dwr Cymru and species experts.

In 2005 an outbreak of Cryptosporidiosis in the water supply drawn from the lake led to improvements being planned for the water treatment works. Work started in 2009 2 miles (3.2 km) down stream on an updated water treatment plant which included froth flotation, upward flow clarifiers and UV sterilisation of the treated water. The revised plant came online in September 2010

Further up the mountainside is the Welsh Highland Railway, which offers splendid views of the lake from the south. Road and railway both run from Caernarfon to Beddgelert and then through the Aberglaslyn Pass to Porthmadog. The railway comes from Caernarfon and as it approaches the lake veers left from the Castell Cidwm rock face through a hand-carved rock cutting and under a small bridge before heading up the east side of the lake towards Snowdon Ranger railway station and later Rhyd Ddu railway station at the start of the Rhyd Ddu path to the summit of Snowdon.

Rail and road run side by side for over half a mile to the summit of the mountain pass at Pitt's Head where the road passes over the railway before descending steeply through Nant Colwyn to Beddgelert. Pitt's Head is also the starting point of the old 'Beddgelert' route of the Rhyd Ddu path to Snowdon. Midway along the eastern shore of the lake is the starting point of the easier but less sensational Snowdon Ranger path to the summit of Snowdon. This route makes an excellent way down Snowdon as the view of the lake is magnificent whatever the weather.

Since the Middle Ages the overland route from Caernarfon to Beddgelert via Llyn Cwellyn and then via the River Glaslyn and the Traeth Mawr to Cardigan Bay was often the preferred alternative to the long voyage round the Llŷn Peninsula.
