= Llyn Parc =

Reservoir in Conwy County Borough, Wales

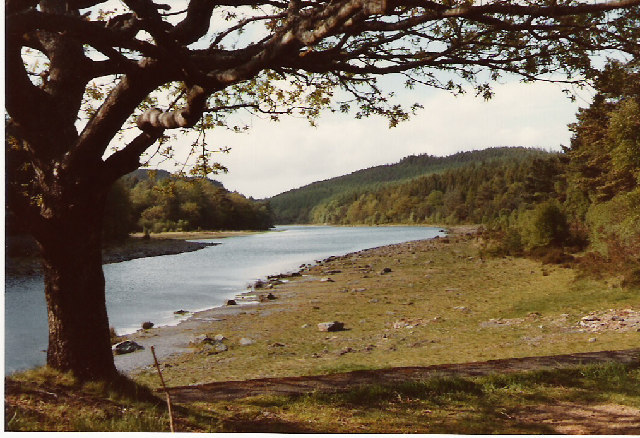
- Looking north with the water at a lower level than normal

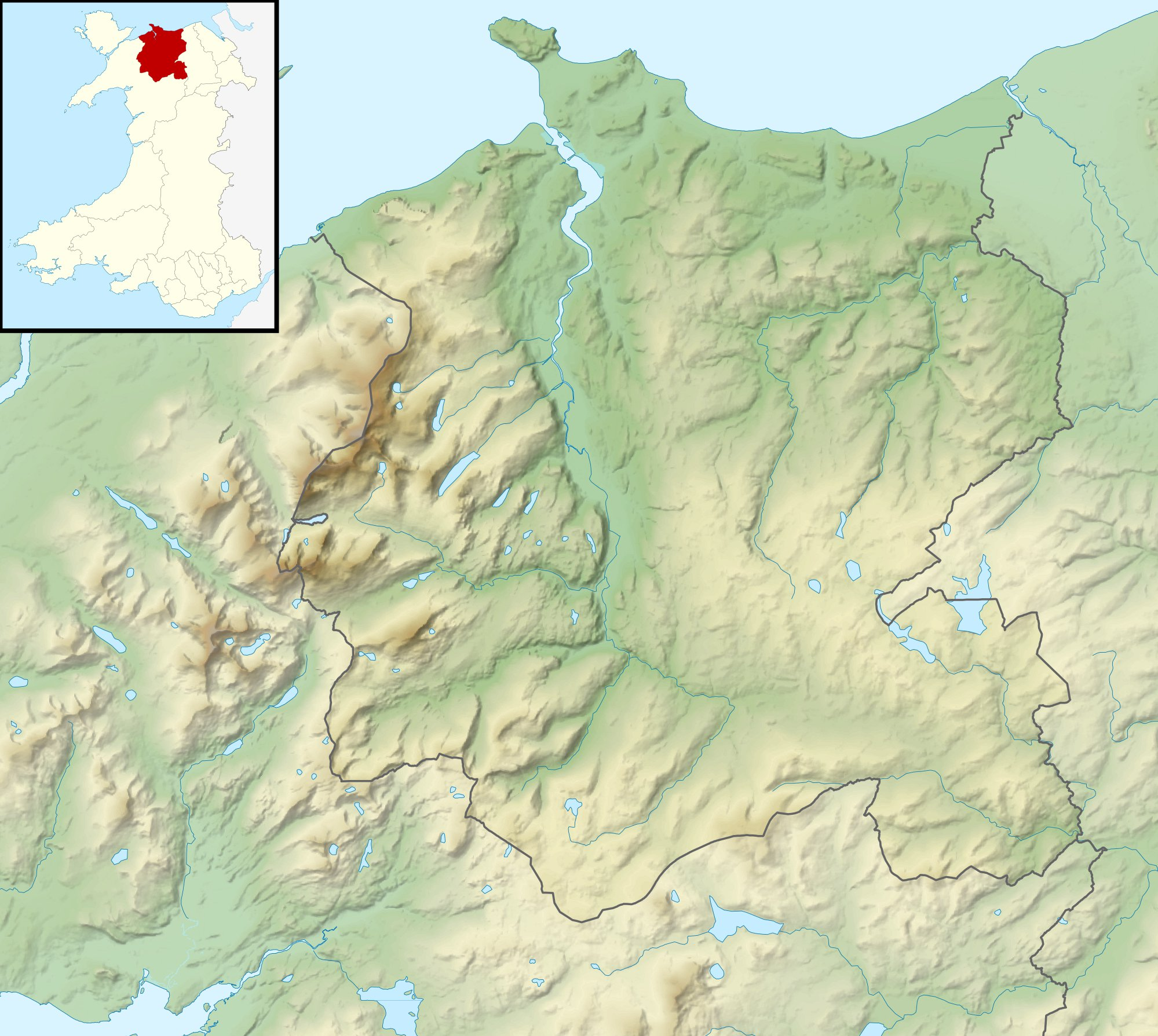
- Location within Conwy
- Location: Gwydir Forest, North Wales
- Coordinates: 53°6′46″N 3°48′22″W
- Type: natural
- Basin countries: United Kingdom
- Surface area: 22 acres (8.9 ha)
- Surface elevation: 664 ft (202 m)

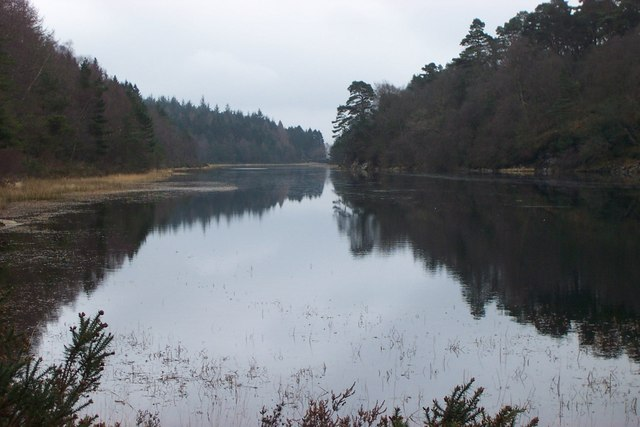
Llyn Parc, looking south.

Llyn Parc (also known as "Llyn y Parc") is a lake in the Gwydir Forest in North Wales.

Lying at a height of 664 feet, it covers an area of 22 acres (89,000 m^{2}), and is long and narrow in shape.

A natural lake, the building of a dam at the southern end raised the level to provide water to drive machinery at the nearby Aberllyn lead and zinc mine, which in 1900 employed some 200 men. The outflow of the lake today passes the ruined remains of the mills before joining the River Conwy.

To the west of the lake are the remains of a high wall, built by French Napoleonic prisoners of war, to keep deer within the Gwydir High Park.

In 1938, when a large forest fire destroyed parts of the forest, it was hoped that Llyn Parc would act as a natural fire break. The fire, though, was so fierce that it crossed from one side to the other.

The high (though reducing) level of lead in the water means that there are no fish in the lake.

Some sources quote that the area around Llyn Parc is reported to be one of the few remaining strongholds of the red squirrel. This is not so, confusion having arisen between this location and the similarly named "Llyn Parc Mawr" at Newborough on Anglesey.
