= Llyn Nantlle Uchaf =

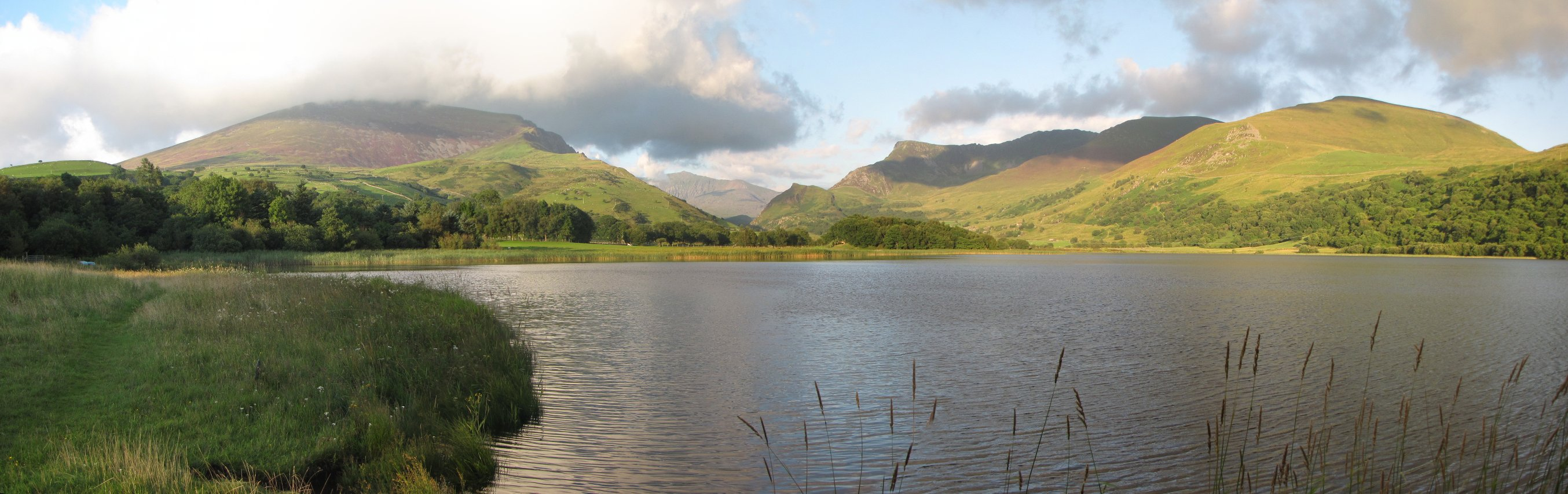

- Location within Gwynedd
- Location: Wales
- Coordinates: 53°3′15″N 4°13′4″W
- Lake type: natural
- Primary outflows: Afon Llyfni
- Basin countries: United Kingdom
- Surface area: 80 acres (32 ha)
- Settlements: Nantlle

Llyn Nantlle Uchaf (Welsh for 'Upper Nantlle Lake') is a lake in the Nantlle Valley, Gwynedd, Wales. The lake forms the foreground in Richard Wilson's painting "Snowdon from Llyn Nantlle".

Llyn Nantlle Isaf (Lower Nantlle Lake) no longer exists as it was drained to protect the slate works.
