= Llyn Arenig Fawr =

Reservoir in Gwynedd, North Wales

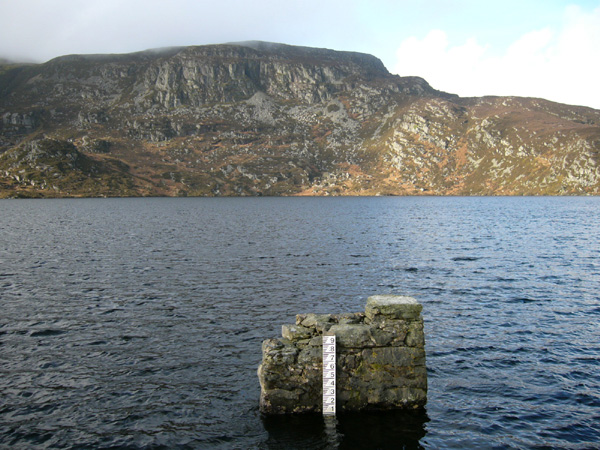

- Location within Gwynedd
- Location: Gwynedd, North Wales
- Coordinates: 52°55′39″N 3°43′0″W
- Type: reservoir, natural
- Basin countries: United Kingdom

Llyn Arenig Fawr is a lake and reservoir located to the northeast of Arenig Fawr, a mountain in North Wales.

The reservoir's primary purpose is to supply water to the nearby town of Bala and the numerous small villages in the surrounding area. From the lake there is an energetic uphill walk to the summit of Arenig Fawr, from which there are extensive views.

Eggs of the gwyniad, a freshwater fish previously restricted to nearby Llyn Tegid (Bala Lake), were introduced to Llyn Arenig Fawr between 2003 and 2007 as a conservation measure.
