= Llyn Bodgynydd =

Reservoir in Conwy County Borough, Wales

Llyn Bodgynydd Bod Mawr
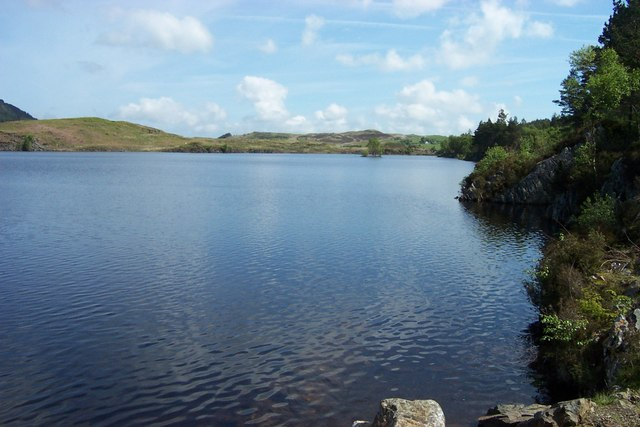

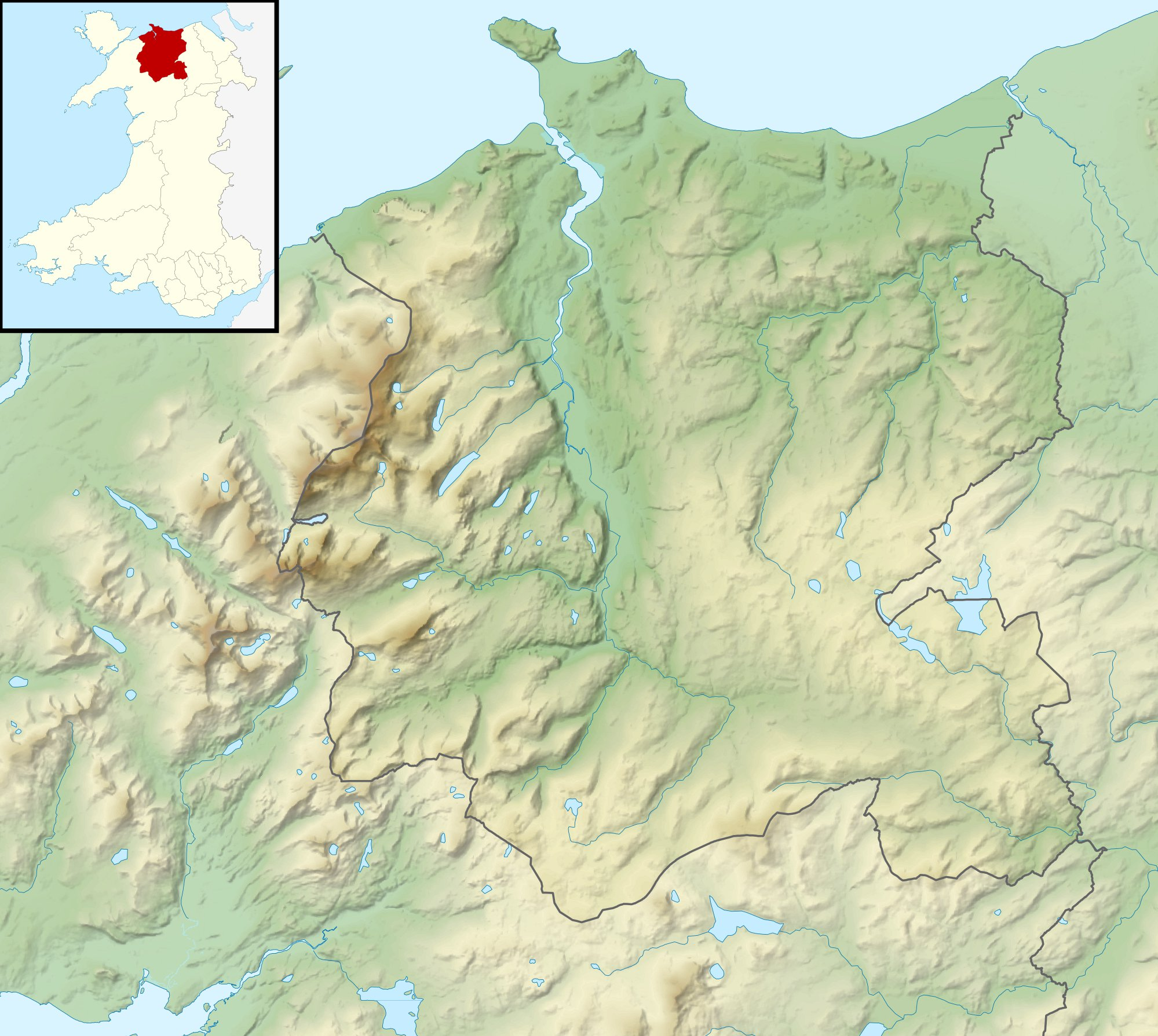
- Location within Conwy
- Location: North Wales
- Coordinates: 53°7′0″N 3°51′10″W
- Type: natural
- Basin countries: United Kingdom
- Surface area: 14 acres (5.7 ha)
- Surface elevation: 822 ft (251 m)

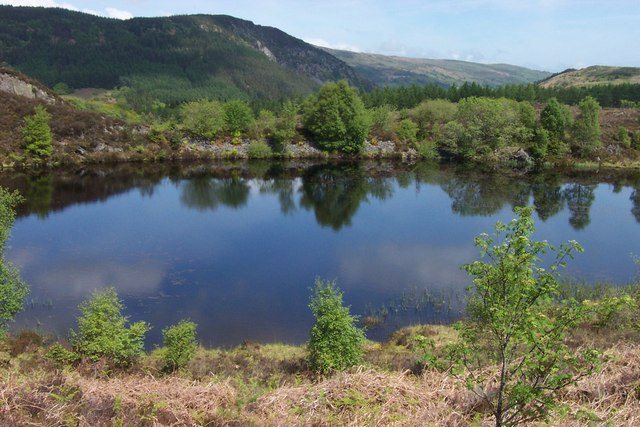
"Bod Bach", the smaller of the Bodgynydd lakes

Llyn Bodgynydd is a lake in the Gwydir Forest in North Wales. It covers an area of some 14 acres (57,000 m^{2}), and lies at a height of 822 feet (251 m) a.s.l.

It is locally known as "Llyn Bod", or "Bod Mawr" (big), distinguishing it from a nearby, but much smaller lake ("Bod Bach" or "Cors Bodgynydd reservoir") to the north-east. Water from the larger lake flows to the smaller.

Both these lakes were dammed to create reservoirs to produce water to turn the large water wheel at the nearby Pandora mine, though they now hold less water than they once did due to the demolition of Bod Bach dam, and the altering of the sluice control at Bod Mawr in 1970.

An area beside the smaller lake has been designated the Cors Bodgynydd Nature Reserve due to the rich variety of plant and animal life there.

The lakeside affords good views of the adjacent hills, and fishing rights are held by Llanrwst Fishing Club.
