= Cardiff Corporation Waterworks =

Defunct UK water and sewerage provider

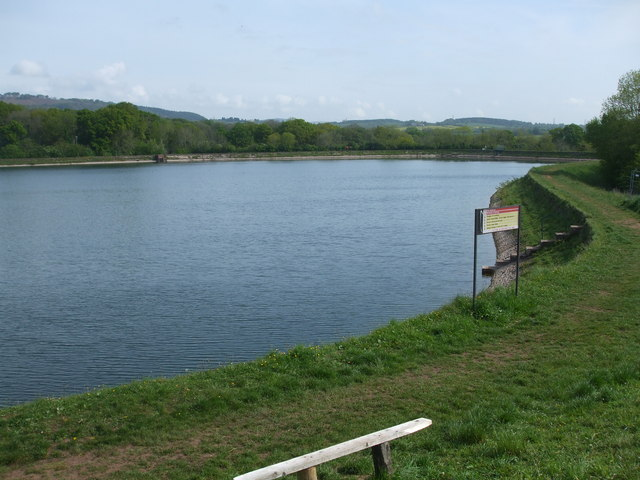
- Lisvane reservoir was the first to be built in Cardiff in the early 1860s
- Industry: Water
- Fate: Taken over
- Headquarters: Cardiff, Wales

Cardiff Corporation Waterworks, its predecessors and successors have provided a public water supply and sewerage and sewage treatment services to the Welsh city of Cardiff since 1850.

== History ==
In the early 19th century, most of Cardiff was built on land overlaying gravel beds, which extended to the north and west of the populated area. Residents obtained their water from private and public wells, dug down into the gravel beds. The town was split into two parishes in 1841, St John the Baptist and St Mary, and at that time the population was 10,077. The main public well was in the High Street, although water was also obtained from the River Taff and the Glamorganshire Canal. Industrial development, notably the construction of the West Bute Dock in 1839 and the Taff Vale Railway to connect the dock to the railway system, meant that the population began to increase significantly, and the need to provide a better water supply became urgent.

Cardiff Waterworks Act 1850
- Act of Parliament
- Parliament of the United Kingdom
- Long title: An Act for supplying with Water the Town and Port of Cardiff and the Neighbourhood thereof, in the County of Glamorgan.
- Citation: 13 & 14 Vict. c. lxix

Dates
- Royal assent: 15 July 1850

Text of statute as originally enacted

Cardiff Waterworks Act 1853
- Act of Parliament
- Parliament of the United Kingdom
- Long title: An Act for repealing an Act called "The Cardiff Waterworks Act, 1850," and granting other Powers in lieu thereof; and for authorizing the Cardiff Waterworks Company to raise further Money.
- Citation: 16 & 17 Vict. c. xxiv

Dates
- Royal assent: 14 June 1853

Text of statute as originally enacted

In 1850 a private company obtained the Cardiff Waterworks Act 1850 (13 & 14 Vict. c. lxix) allowing them to build a water works, with which to supply water to the town, the port, and a number of surrounding villages. The Cardiff Waterworks Company had an authorised capital of £20,000, but soon found that this was not sufficient to complete the works, and so went back to Parliament. They obtained a new act of Parliament, the Cardiff Waterworks Act 1853 (16 & 17 Vict. c. xxiv), on 14 June 1853, which repealed the first one, and allowed them to raise more capital. They constructed a pumping station at Ely, close to the River Ely, some 3 miles (4.8 km) to the west of the town centre. Water from the river entered a settling pool, and was then filtered before being pumped to a service reservoir at Penhill, Llandaff, to the north of the town, from where a network of pipes allowed it to reach the town and the docks by gravity. Subsequently, the supply was increased by a culvert built along the south side of the river, which collected water from springs and the water bearing strata nearby.

Cardiff Waterworks Act 1860
- Act of Parliament
- Parliament of the United Kingdom
- Long title: An Act for enabling the Cardiff Waterworks Company to construct additional Works, and obtain a further Supply of Water for the Town of Cardiff and the surrounding Districts in the County of Glamorgan; and for other Purposes.
- Citation: 23 & 24 Vict. c. cv

Dates
- Royal assent: 3 July 1860

Cardiff continued to expand, with the opening of the Rhymney Railway in 1858 and the Bute East Dock the following year, and so the water company obtained a third act, the Cardiff Waterworks Act 1860 (23 & 24 Vict. c. cv), allowing them to increase their capital resources and the geographical area which they supplied. Works included a storage reservoir at Lisvane, with a catchment area of 2,200 acres (890 ha), collecting water from the Llanishen, Nant Mawr, Nant Draw, Nant Felin and Nant Dulas. Pipes were laid from the reservoir to intakes on each of the streams, and filter beds were constructed on the outlet from the reservoir. In order to supply Penarth, some 4 miles (6.4 km) to the south-west of the town centre, a low-level service reservoir was built at Cogan, from where pumps raised the water 170 feet (52 m) to a distribution reservoir at Llandough, which was sufficiently high to supply Penarth by gravity. Water was supplied to a number of surrounding parishes, the total area of supply being 41.85 square miles (108.4 km^{2}). The company could not take more than 3 million imperial gallons (14 megalitres) (Ml) per day from the River Ely, but that and the Lisvane reservoir remained sufficient until 1878. The reservoir held 80 million imperial gallons (360 Ml) of water.

Cardiff Waterworks Act 1878
- Act of Parliament
- Parliament of the United Kingdom
- Long title: An Act for empowering the Cardiff Waterworks Company to construct additional Works, and to raise additional Capital; and for other purposes.
- Citation: 41 & 42 Vict. c. cxliv

Dates
- Royal assent: 4 July 1878
Other legislation
Repealed by	South Glamorgan Act 1976

Status: Repealed

Text of statute as originally enacted

In 1875, Cardiff Corporation obtained parliamentary approval to buy out the Cardiff Waterworks Company in the Cardiff Improvement Act 1875 (38 & 39 Vict. c. clxxxvii), but failed to reach an agreement with them at the time. The company sought a fourth act of Parliament, the Cardiff Waterworks Act 1878 (41 & 42 Vict. c. cxliv), to enable them to construct additional works at Ely, and a new reservoir at Llanishen to supplement the supply to Cardiff and to extend their area of supply to parts of Llandaff and Whitchurch. The corporation again tried to buy out the company, but still could not reach agreement, so decided to oppose the company's bill, on the basis that the new works would not be adequate for the future requirements of Cardiff. On the day before the bill was due to appear before the House of Commons committee, the company agreed to sell, for a price of £300,000, resulting in the corporation withdrawing their objections. They paid the costs of getting the bill through Parliament, and also redeemed the company's debenture bonds, at a cost of £20,450.

Parliamentary approval for the purchase of the company and authority to borrow £470,000 was obtained in the Cardiff Corporation Act 1879 (42 & 43 Vict. c. cxxxiii). The corporation took possession of the works on 29 September 1879, but the deed confirming the transfer of ownership was not signed until 24 December. The payment of the money was not without drama, as the corporation wanted to use two cheques, one for £165,000 drawn on the National Provincial Bank, and another for £135,000 drawn on the Brecon Old Bank. Two days before the final purchase, the company declined to accept the cheques, despite assurances from the banks that they would be honoured, and so the corporation elected to pay in gold. The company realised the enormous task of counting that much money, and so the banks requested the Bank of England to print two special notes, for the two amounts agreed. On the final day, officers from the corporation collected the note for £165,000 from the National Provincial Bank, but when they got to the Brecon Old Bank, the note had not arrived. They refused to leave the bank even when it closed, and half an hour later, the postman delivered it, enabling the purchase to be completed.

=== Corporation ownership ===
The corporation consulted John Taylor, one of the original directors and promoters of the Cardiff Waterworks Company, who had also been their engineer, about the works at Ely. In a report produced on 23 September 1880, he recommended that the culverts be extended, and work began on new culverts on the north bank of the river, as a way to quickly increase the volume of water available. In an average year, this increased the resources to 1 million imperial gallons (4.5 Ml) per day, and even in the very dry years of 1884 and 1887, the yield was still 900,000 imperial gallons (4.1 Ml) per day. The cost of the work was £10,614, while the project was managed by John Avery Brandon Williams, who had been Borough Engineer since 14 August 1876, and then became Waterworks Engineer from 11 June 1883. In March 1881, he was asked to produce a report on all possible sources of water for Cardiff, so that planning for the future could begin.

He presented his extensive findings in May and August 1881, and suggested that the best scheme would be to utilise the waters of the Taff Fawr, one of the two sources of the River Taff, on the southern slopes of the Brecon Beacons. He also suggested that the capacity of the Llanishen Reservoir, authorised by the Cardiff Waterworks Act 1878, could be increased from 140 million imperial gallons (640 Ml) to 300 million imperial gallons (1,400 Ml), without exceeding the limits of deviation specified by the Act. Unable to decide the best way to proceed, they asked the water engineer John Frederick Bateman for advice in December 1881, and in June 1882 he confirmed that the Taff Fawr scheme was the best option. Work began at Llanishen soon afterwards, so that surplus water from the Lisvane catchment would not be lost while the Beacons reservoir scheme was being built. The contract for Llanishen Reservoir was awarded to John Mackey, but it is not clear exactly what this included, since the corporation awarded a contract for enlargement works soon after Mackey completed his contract in 1884. Hill Brothers began work on this second phase, but pulled out in July, due to financial difficulties, after which T A Walker took over, completing the work in 1886.

A bill for the Taff Fawr scheme was submitted to Parliament in November 1883, and a House of Commons committee considered it between 1 May and 20 May 1884, as there were 16 petitions against it, particularly from riparian landowners. The corporation called on many of the major water engineers of the day to give evidence, including Bateman, Thomas Hawksley, James Mansergh, and George H. Hill. Their own engineer, J. A. B. Williams also gave evidence, as did the meteorologist George James Symonds, and although it cost £3,652 to fight their case, it was successful and the Cardiff Corporation Act 1884 (47 & 48 Vict. c. ccxxii) received royal assent on 7 August. They were empowered to collect water from a catchment of 10,400 acres (42 km^{2}), which was split into an upper and a lower area. Because they had to supply compensation water to maintain the flow in the Taff Fawr, treating the catchment as two separate areas meant that the full amount of compensation water did not have to be provided from the start of the project. The upper area covered 4,000 acres (1,600 ha) and required a compensation flow of 3 million imperial gallons (14 Ml) per day, under half of the total for the whole catchment.

The whole scheme consisted of three storage reservoirs, two in the upper area and one in the lower area, with a combined capacity of 1,220 million imperial gallons (5,500 Ml), a 32-mile (51 km) pipeline, using pipes of 24 inches (610 mm) and 29 inches (740 mm) diameter, running from the upper reservoirs to Lisvane and Llanishen, with intermediate balancing reservoirs at Cefn, Blackbrook, and Rhiwbina. There was also a service reservoir and filter beds at Rhiwbina, from which Llandaff, Maindy, Penarth, Penylan and Whitchurch could be supplied by gravity. Work began on the pipeline in October 1885, and was completed in September 1888. Construction of the balancing and service reservoirs began in December 1887 and was completed in November 1888. The first storage reservoir to be built was Cantreff Reservoir No.2, the lowest of the two in the upper area. Construction took rather longer, as work started in the spring of 1886, but was delayed as the Corporation became embroiled in litigation with the first and second contractors employed to carry out the work. Eventually they took control of the task themselves on 13 June 1891, and the reservoir was operational by 14 September 1892, with Williams, their Waterworks Engineer, overseeing the use of direct labour. In order to facilitate the transport of materials to site, 6 miles (9.7 km) of standard gauge railway were built, connecting to the mainline near Cefn-coed-y-cymmer station. Cantreff Reservoir became known as Cantref Reservoir in the 20th century.

The Cardiff Corporation Act 1884 stated that Beacons Reservoir, the highest of the three, would have a capacity of 160 million imperial gallons (730 Ml) but as the details were being worked out, Williams the Waterworks Engineer found that its capacity could be more than doubled by building the dam a little higher up the valley. Geological investigation revealed that the new site would also provide a solid watertight foundation, and so the Corporation went back to Parliament, and the Cardiff Corporation Act 1894 (57 & 58 Vict. c. clxi) authorised the change. Work had started in April 1893, and in view of the experience with contractors on Cantref, they decided to complete the entire project using direct labour. The Board of Trade had sanctioned an extension of the railway from Cantref to the Beacons Reservoir site on 27 April 1893, and by June the new track had been laid, creating a railway that was 7.25 miles (11.67 km) long. By the autumn, a network of sidings and tracks had been completed, as had offices, a blacksmith's shop, a boiler house, workshops for carpenters, a fitting shop, a shed for the locomotives, a sawmill, some stables and a wagon shop. Much of the village was built using buildings which had previously been used on the Cantref project, and it included accommodation for 335 men, with housing for an additional 85 remaining at Cantref.

While the embankment with its clay core were being built, the corporation employed around 500 men, with some extracting stone from a quarry near Cefn Coed, others working at the Crawshay Brothers' clay pit excavating the puddle clay, and a number working on the railway, besides those working on the dam. February 1896 was a record month, when some 4,100 tons of clay were removed from the clay pit and transported to the dam. This traffic ceased at Christmas 1896, and completion of the details took place in the spring and summer of 1897. Impounding of the Taff Fawr began on 17 September, with a formal opening ceremony held on 30 September 1897. The capacity of the enlarged reservoir was 345 million imperial gallons (1,570 Ml).

=== New personnel ===
On 24 June 1895, the Waterworks Engineer, J. A. B. Williams, had resigned, to be replaced by Charles Henry Priestley. One of the last tasks that Williams completed was to produce plans showing the reservoirs and all the land owned by the corporation. Priestley oversaw the latter stages of construction at Beacons Reservoir, and a number of smaller projects, including a water tower and high-level service reservoir at Penylan, to allow the population of Rhymney, St Mellons and Penylan to benefit from a proper water supply, the construction of three more filter beds at Heath, and the expansion of the pipework within the town. The Heath site, close to the Rhymney Railway, already contained a service reservoir and three filter beds. Thomas D. Ridley of Cardiff and Middlesbrough was awarded a contract worth £10,115 for three more filter beds, and to facilitate the transport of materials to the site, a siding was constructed from the Rhymney Railway. Work began on 5 April 1897, with sand and gravel for the filters coming from Bideford in Devon by ship to Cardiff, and then by rail into the site. Spoil was removed by rail and taken to Cardiff Docks, where a new embankment was being constructed. Ridley had completed the project by 1 March 1898, but soon afterwards was awarded a second contract, to construct two more filters and a second service reservoir, which he completed by the end of 1898. In order to enable the sand and gravel to be changed, a Decauville portable railway was installed, but no further details are known. The corporation's area of supply was extended to include St Fagans in 1902, and money was borrowed to fund a new service reservoir at Leckwith and extensions to the works at Rhiwbina, Cogan, and Heath. A bypass was constructed near Llanishen viaduct, to enable water from the Taff Fawr pipeline to be routed directly to the filter beds at Heath, and a second supply for sanitary purposes was laid into the town.

Consideration was given to increasing the size of the Llwyn-on Reservoir so that it could supply the compensation water for the whole catchment, 7.75 million imperial gallons (35.2 Ml) per day. When the plans were eventually deposited before Parliament, the reservoir was bigger again, with a capacity of 1,260 million imperial gallons (5,700 Ml). Louis P Nott was awarded a contract for construction in November 1910, at a price of £201,077. The project was expected to take six years from January 1911, but due to the onset of the First World War, HM Treasury ordered that work should cease in 1915. Nott was not happy with the settlement, and began litigation. Although he died in 1916, his cause was taken up by the engineer Robert Brodie, and after an appeal against the outcome of arbitration by the corporation, the House of Lords eventually ruled in favour of Nott. When the war ended, the contract was terminated, and the corporation finished building the reservoir using direct labour, with Priestley overseeing the work, H. W. B. Cotterill acting as resident engineer and manager, and George Wainfer acting as site foreman. Impounding of water began on 23 June 1926, initiated by the Lord Mayor, W. P. Francis, and by November the reservoir was full, although commissioning did not take place until May 1927.

In 1922, the corporation began building new filters and a filter house at the foot of the Cantref dam. Nott, as part of the Llwyn-on contract, had rebuilt the railway from Cefn to Llwyn-on in 1911, and it was extended up to Cantref before construction of the filters began. The railway took a new route in the vicinity of Llwyn-on, climbing to higher ground on the west side of the reservoir, but rejoined the historic route at the northern end of the reservoir. A total of eleven steam locomotives ran on the railway, six owned by Nott, and six during the corporation phase of the build, one of which was obtained from Nott's executors. The filters were put into service on 23 June 1926, shortly after Priestley had retired in April, aged 72, and the railway above Llwyn-on was also lifted in April 1926. The rest of the railway was probably lifted in 1928, and one of the locomotives, Abernant, made by Manning Wardle in 1921, has survived and was awaiting restoration at the Great Central Railway (Nottingham) in 2012.

In June 1920 work started on a service reservoir at Wenallt, a little to the north of Llanishen Reservoir. It was designed to hold 15 million imperial gallons (68 Ml) of water, and was surrounded by concrete walls. Initially, the corporation used direct labour, and they constructed a small railway from the reservoir site to the bottom of the field, which was operational by November 1920. In late 1922, a siding was constructed at Whitchurch station, about 1 mile (1.6 km) away. and an aerial ropeway was used to move materials to the site. Work stopped in March 1924, and in October Hybart, Broadhead & Company won a contract to continue construction. They used the aerial ropeway and the onsite railway to make progress, but subsidence occurred, and their contract was terminated on 31 March 1926. The corporation employed Francois Cementation Company to make borings and carry out remedial work in 1926-1927 and finished the construction using direct labour. The reservoir was half-filled in November 1927, and fully filled in February 1928. At some point, a roof was fitted to cover the reservoir, plans for which were drawn up in 1939, in order to protect the water supply during the war.

Two 0-4-0 Wren class saddle tanks are known to have worked at the site, both manufactured by Kerr, Stuart and Company. No.3114 dating from 1918 was bought second hand from the Ministry of Munitions and subsequently worked on the Lake Vyrnwy pipeline contract for Liverpool Corporation Waterworks. Between 1932 and 1937, it was used on the construction of Fernilee Reservoir for Stockport Corporation, and is now preserved as part of the historic locomotive collection at the Vale of Rheidol Railway. Kerr Stuart No.4161 was bought new in 1921 and was moved to Llanishen Reservoir in 1929, where a 2 ft (610 mm)-gauge railway was used as part of a project to dredge the reservoir in 1929–1930. Afterwards, the locomotive was sold, and worked at a quarry near Newton Abbot for many years. Photographs taken at Wenallt in 1926 also show a small wing tank locomotive with a cab, but no further details are known.

In the mid-20th century, Heath filters were decommissioned, to be replaced by a treatment works at Rhiwbina. In the 1960s, the Corporation built Llandegfedd Reservoir. It was designed to hold 5,390 million imperial gallons (24,500 Ml), and is located in the valley of the Sôr Brook near Pontypool and the Royal Ordnance Factory at Glascoed. The dam consists of an earth embankment, with a core of rolled clay, and it is filled by water pumped from an intake on the River Usk at Prioress Mill, Rhadyr. It was opened in two stages in spring 1964 and spring 1965. Unlike previous reservoirs, the water was not used exclusively by Cardiff Corporation, but was split between five undertakings. Cardiff were allocated 9 million imperial gallons (41 Ml) per day, Newport and South Monmouthshire Water Board 5 million imperial gallons (23 Ml) per day, and Abertillery and District Water Board, and Pontypool and District Water Company were allocated 3 million imperial gallons (14 Ml) per day each. 1,825 million imperial gallons (8,300 Ml) per year was also supplied to the Spencer Steel Works at Llanwern. Water from the reservoir was treated by the treatment works at Sluvad and flowed to Cardiff by gravity.

Most of the Cardiff Corporation Waterworks major structures were grade II listed in the 21st century, Cantref Reservoir and dam in June 2002, the masonry structures at Beacons Reservoir in June 2005, the water filtration plant at Cantref in July 2005, and the reservoirs and dams at Beacons and Llanishen in July 2009.

=== Sewage disposal ===
Faced with the fact that many towns suffered from outbreaks of typhus and cholera, the social reformer Edwin Chadwick had produced his report The Sanitary Conditions of the Labouring Classes in Britain in 1842. He was convinced that there was a link between insanitary conditions and poor health, leading to short life expectancy. He argued that a good, constant supply of water was necessary to improve conditions and that proper drainage was just as important. His report caught the public imagination, and in 1847, Lord Morpeth, an ally of Chadwick, introduced a bill into Parliament that would have required local authorities to ensure that all houses in towns had a proper water supply, and a drainage system to take away waste. By the time it became the Public Health Act 1848, many of the important points had been removed, but it did establish a Board of Health. Towns and districts could request an inspection from the Board of Health, which then gave them powers which would otherwise have required a local act of Parliament, which was a costly process. Where there was support for it, a local board was formed to implement sanitary reforms.

In 1848/49 there was a serious outbreak of the water-borne disease cholera, with some 3,000 deaths reported in Glamorganshire, of which over 350 occurred in Cardiff. Cardiff was one of the early towns in Glamorgan to have a local board of health. As required by the act, one-tenth of the ratepayers had to request the Board of Health to carry out an inspection, which was performed by Thomas Webster Rammell. After the enquiry, the borough council became the local board of health for Cardiff in September 1850, although separate meetings were held to consider board of health issues until 1875, when they became part of the main business of the council. Henry James Paine, Cardiff's Officer of Health, reported 15 deaths from cholera in August 1854, although he thought the source might have been foreign ships, since six of the casualties were seamen, and the rest were closely associated with them.

If the late 1850s, the civil engineer Thomas Waring was the engineer responsible for constructing Cardiff's network of sewers, a task in which he was assisted for 18 months during 1856 and 1857 by Alfred Mountain Fowler, who went on to become president of the Association of Municipal and County Engineers. Between 1848 and 1872, nearly £100,000 was spent on improving the drainage and water supply systems in the town. The sewers converged to the east of Roath Dock, where there was a small indentation in the coastline, and the untreated effluent was discharged directly into the sea. This remained the practice until the 1980s, when the Cardiff Bay Development Corporation was formed in 1987. One of the first tasks was to clean up the polluted waters of Cardiff Bay, caused not only by sewage, but also by coal dust and industrial waste. A project costing £14 million began to divert the sewers that discharged into the bay. Welsh Water built a new sewage treatment works on reclaimed land just to the east of the original outfall at Tremorfa, costing £118 million. The final piece in the jigsaw was the construction of Cardiff Bay Barrage, creating a freshwater lake where there had once been tidal mudflats. Environmental opposition was mitigated by creating a large reserve for wild birds a little further to the east, and strict environmental standards, including oxygenating of the water using compressed air, have created a space which is clean enough to support trout and salmon.

The population of west Cardiff, Dinas Powys, Sully, Penarth and Barry are served by another new sewage treatment works. Cog Moors opened in 1990, from which treated effluent is discharged by a long sea outfall at Lavernock Point. In 2020 it was undergoing a £50 million upgrade to create an advanced anaerobic digestion plant, which will generate over 2MWh of electricity per year, using two engines powered by the biogas produced as the sewage sludge is digested.

=== Governance ===
The Water Act 1973 replaced the 27 river authorities of England and Wales with ten regional water authorities, which took over the land drainage, fishery and river management responsibilities of the river authorities, and also became responsible for the provision of water supply and sewage treatment, which was removed from local authority control. Cardiff Corporation Waterworks ceased to exist from 1 April 1974, and its assets passed to the Welsh National Water Development Authority, subsequently becoming the Welsh Water Authority. Further change occurred in 1989, when the water supply and sewerage functions were privatised by the Water Act 1989, while the land drainage, fishery and river management responsibilities passed to the National Rivers Authority. Consequently, water supply and sewerage in Cardiff was taken over by Dwr Cymru Welsh Water.

== Bibliography ==
- Binnie, G. M. (1981). Early Victorian Water Engineers. Thomas Telford. ISBN 978-0-7277-0128-2.
- Bowtell, Harold D; Hill, Geoffrey (2006). Reservoir Builders of South Wales. Industrial Railway Society. ISBN 978-0-9540726-2-9.
- Cross-Rudkin, Peter; Chrimes, Mike (2008). A Biographical Dictionary of Civil Engineers in Great Britain and Ireland: Vol 2: 1830 to 1890. Thomas Telford. ISBN 978-0-7277-3504-1.
- IRS (2012). Industrial Locomotives (Handbook 16EL). Industrial Locomotive Society. ISBN 978-1-901556-79-7.
- Michael, Pamela (2008). "Public Health in Wales (1800-2000)" (PDF). Welsh Assembly Government. Archived (PDF) from the original on 5 March 2022.
- Ofwat (2006). "The Development of the Water Industry in England and Wales" (PDF). OFWAT. Archived from the original (PDF) on 4 June 2015.
- Porter, Elizabeth (1978). Water Management in England and Wales. Cambridge University Press. ISBN 978-0-521-21865-8.
- Shelly, Charles Edward (1892). Transactions of the Seventh International Congress of Hygiene and Demography. Eyre and Spottiswoode.
- Thorpe, David (9 September 2016). "How Cardiff, Wales, Turned a Polluted Bay Into One of Europe's Best Waterfronts". Citiscope. Archived from the original on 11 November 2016.
- Timelines (2020). "Cardiff Water Supply". Engineering Timelines. Archived from the original on 19 August 2020.
- Wheatley, Joseph Larke (1905). History of the Cardiff Corporation Waterworks Undertaking. Cardiff Records: Volume 5. British History Online.

== External sources ==
Media related to Cardiff Corporation Waterworks at Wikimedia Commons
