= Llwyn-onn Reservoir =

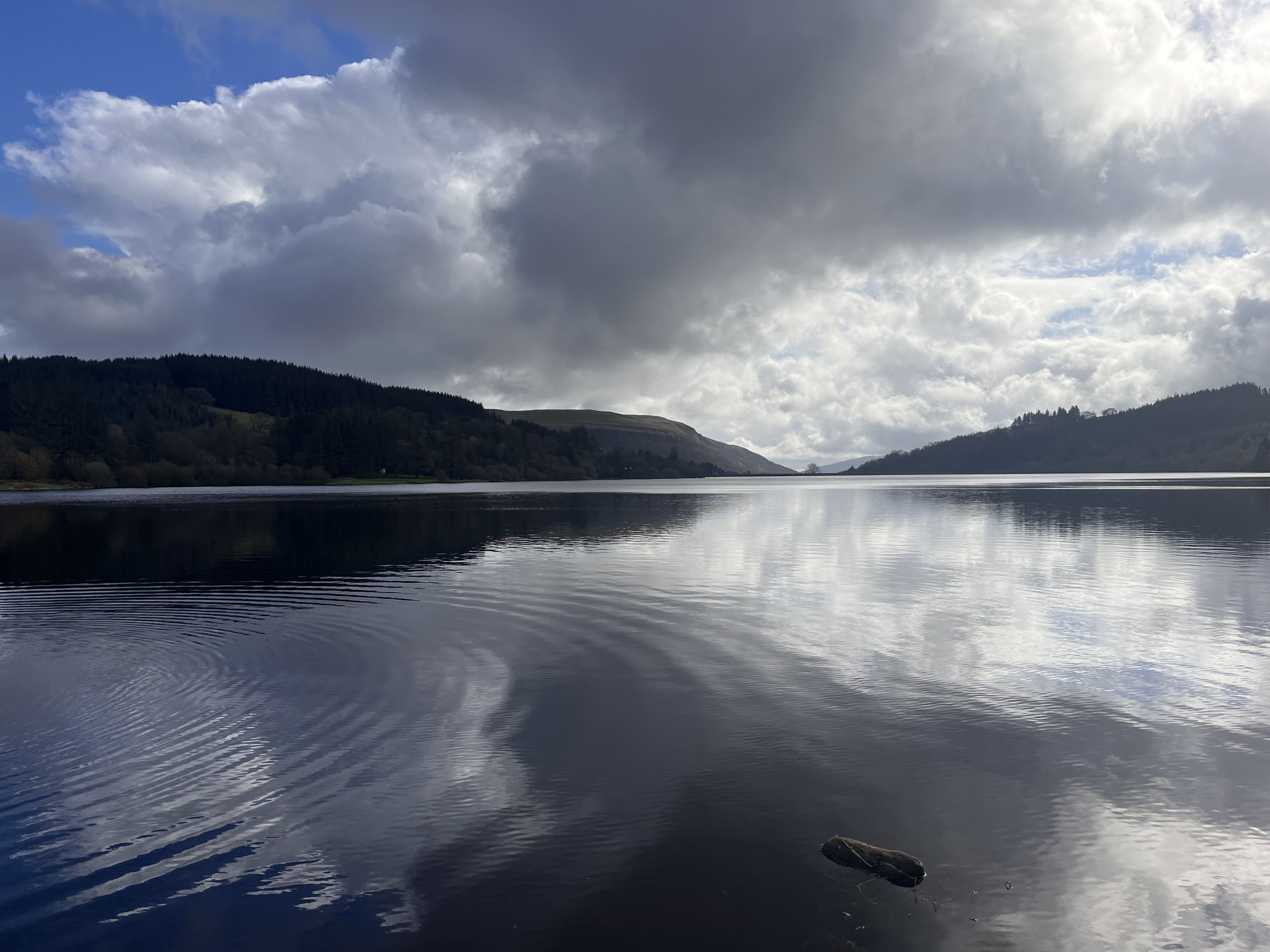

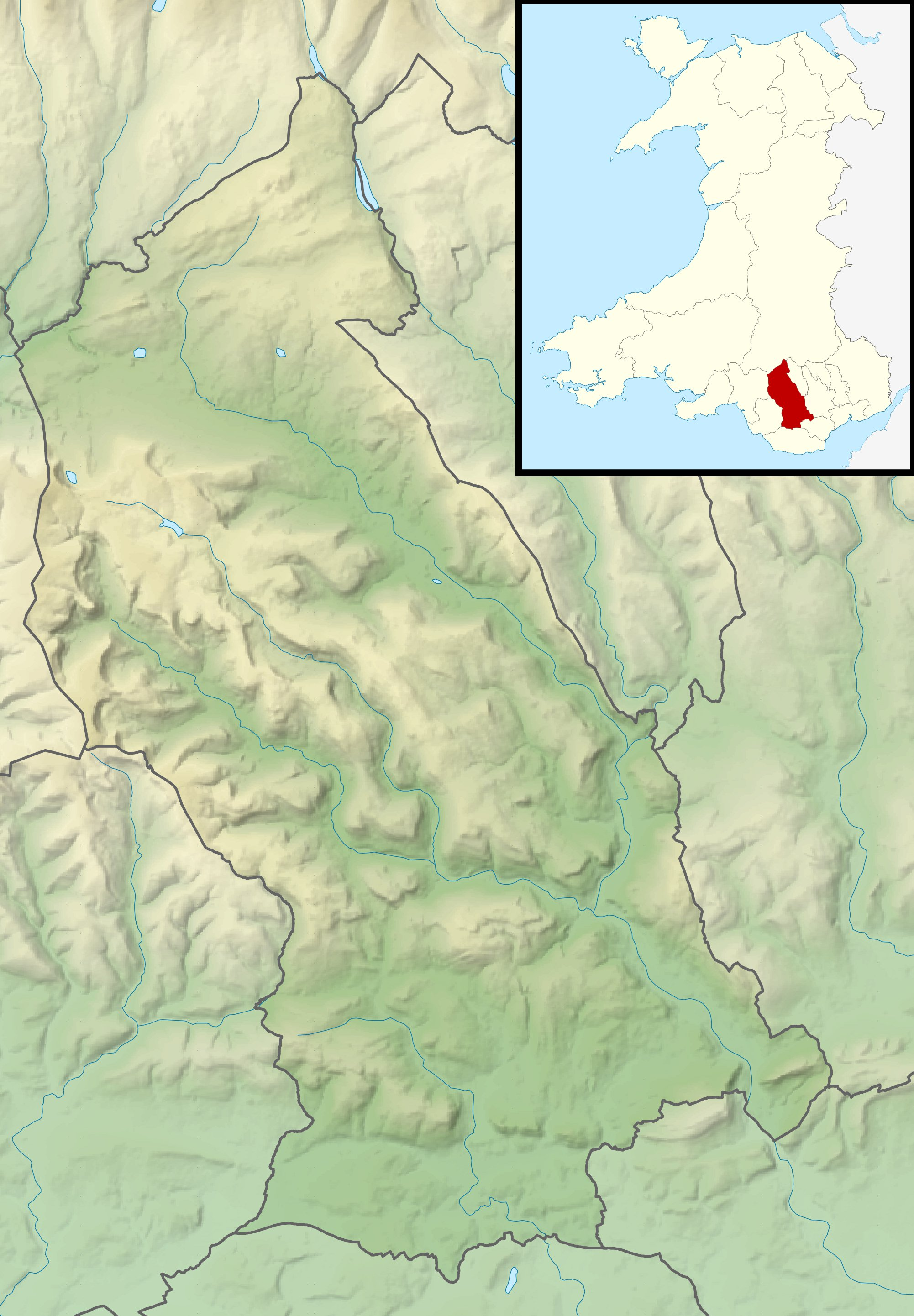
- Location within Rhondda Cynon Taf
- Location: South Wales
- Coordinates: 51°47′50″N 3°26′27″W
- Type: reservoir
- Primary inflows: Taf Fawr, Nant Gwinau, Nant Car, Garwnant
- Primary outflows: Taf Fawr
- Basin countries: United Kingdom

Llwyn-onn Reservoir is the largest and southernmost of the three reservoirs in the Taf Fawr valley in South Wales. Cardiff Corporation Waterworks obtained an act of Parliament in 1884 to authorise construction of the reservoirs, to increase the water supply for Cardiff, but construction of Llwyn-onn Reservoir did not start until 1911 and was completed in the 1920s.

The reservoir, which has been owned and managed by Welsh Water and its predecessor organisation, the Welsh Water Authority, since 1973, is located within the Brecon Beacons National Park with its eastern half in the Merthyr Tydfil unitary authority area and the western half in Rhondda Cynon Taf. The village of Llwyn-Onn is nearby and the A470 trunk road runs along its eastern shoreline.

== History ==
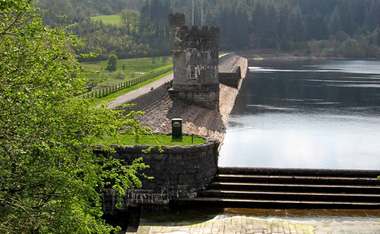
The reservoir dam

Cardiff Corporation had bought out the Cardiff Waterworks Company in 1879, and in March 1881 asked their Borough Engineer, John Avery Brandon Williams, to produce a report on all possible sources of water for Cardiff, so that they could plan for the future. Williams presented his reports in May and August 1881, suggesting that the best scheme was to impound the waters of the upper Taff Fawr. After consulting the water engineer John Frederick Bateman, who also recommended the Taff Fawr scheme in June 1882 as the one most likely to meet the needs for water at the lowest cost, the Corporation presented a bill to Parliament in November 1883, which was considered by a House of Commons Committee between 1 May and 20 May 1884. It faced serious opposition from riparian landowners and there were 16 petitions against it, but several influential civil engineers was called to give evidence, notably Bateman, Thomas Hawksley James Mansergh, and George H. Hill. J A B Williams, their own Engineer, and the meteorologist George James Symonds also gave evidence, and although it cost the Corporation £3,652 to fight the case, royal assent was obtained for the Cardiff Corporation Act 1884 (47 & 48 Vict. c. ccxxii), a local act of Parliament, on 7 August.

The catchment of the upper Taff Fawr was 10,400 acres (42 km^{2}) but it was split into an upper area of 4,000 acres (16 km^{2}) and a lower one of 6,400 acres (26 km^{2}). Any works had to provide compensation water to maintain the flow in the Taff Fawr, and working on the upper area first meant that they only had to supply 3 million imperial gallons (14 Ml) per day of compensation flow until work started on the lower area. Cantref Reservoir, at the time known as Cantreff, was the first to be built, together with a 32-mile (51 km) pipeline to Lisvane Reservoir and Llanishen Reservoir and intermediate balancing reservoirs at Blackbrook, Cefn, and Rhiwbina. Work on the pipeline was completed in September 1888, and on the balancing reservoirs in November 1888. Cantref Reservoir was completed on 14 September 1892, and Beacons Reservoir was completed on 30 September 1897.

For Llwyn-onn Reservoir, the Cardiff Corporation Act 1884 specified a dam on the River Taf Fawr 4 miles (6.4 km) upstream from Merthyr Tydfil to create a reservoir with a capacity of 670 million imperial gallons (3.0 Gl). During 1902, the Corporation looked at increasing its capacity, so that Cantref and Beacons could be used exclusively for water supply, and all of the compensation flow for the Taf Fawr, which would then be 7.75 million imperial gallons (35.2 Ml) per day, could be provided by the new reservoir. They also looked at the possibility of building a fourth reservoir between Llwyn-onn and Cantref. They had purchased 280 acres (110 ha) of land which was adequate for the original reservoir, but considered buying more land. When the corporation decided to proceed, they elected for a reservoir that was considerably bigger than their 1902 plans, and in 1909, a new Act was obtained that doubled the permitted size to 1,260 million imperial gallons (5,700 Ml).

=== Pre-war construction ===
For the upper two reservoirs, materials had been moved to site by a standard gauge private railway, which was eventually 7.25 miles (11.7 km) long, running from a junction with the main line at Cefn-coed-y-cymmer to Beacons Reservoir. Once Beacons was completed, the upper sections of the railway were lifted, and it terminated near a small bridge that carried the road to Penderyn over the Taf Fawr, above the location for the new dam. In November 1910, a contract worth £201,077 was awarded to the contractor Louis P Nott of Llanelly and Bristol, which gave him six years from January 1911 to complete the works. The railway from Cefn-coed-y-cymmer had been disused for twelve years, and his first job was to put it back into order, including reconstructing the viaduct that carried it over the Taf Fawr just to the north of Cefn. A new engine shed was built at Cefn yard, and his first locomotive arrived soon afterwards, which was used to carry men from Cefn to the dam site each day. Llwynon House was renovated, for use by the Resident Engineer and his assistants, while offices and huts were constructed on both sides of the Brecon Road nearby. In the spring, a school and a mission room were built, with accommodation for the staff. Mr Hicken of the Navvy Mission Society arrived on 9 May and the Lord Bishop of Llandaff formally opened the mission room on 11 July. Workshops were erected to the west of the road, and huts to accommodate the navvies who lived on site were on higher ground to the east of it.

Work to build the earthen dam started in January 1911, and by June the excavations had reached solid rock. An official inauguration ceremony was held on 28 June 1911, with the Lord Mayor and his party travelling from Cardiff Queen Street to Merthyr Tydfil on the Taff Vale Railway, but it is unclear how they got from there to Cefn yard for the journey onwards to Llwyn-onn. During the ceremony, a keystone was laid, Mr Nott gave the Lord Mayor a trowel, and Charles Henry Priestley, the Waterworks Engineer, gave him a mallet. Afterwards, the mayoral party visited Cantref and Beacons Reservoirs.

For the previous two reservoirs, stone had been obtained from Sychpant Quarry at Cefn, and this was reopened in the summer of 1911. Some granite was also obtained from the De Lank quarries at Bodmin in Cornwall. Clay for the puddle core of the dam was again obtained from a clay field belonging to Cyfarthfa Ironworks, which was by then managed by Guest, Keen and Nettlefolds, rather than the Crawshay Brothers. The field was at Pen-yr-Heolgerrig, and may have been the same one that was used for the previous reservoirs, although the minutes relating to this are not easy to follow. Nott built an engine shed and a connection to a private siding, but details are unclear as to whether it was standard gauge or narrow gauge. Removal of topsoil began on 4 December 1913, and by February 1914, clay was being extracted. The onset of the First World War caused a shortage of labour, and Nott reported this to the Corporation in October 1914. The quarry was partially closed from 1 February 1915, and closed completely on 23 October, while the clay pit was closed down on 3 November. The puddle trench was covered and sealed, and apart from a few men engaged in maintenance, all work stopped.

By the time work ceased, Nott had constructed a water tunnel beneath the dam, and altered the course of the river, so that the works could proceed. The concrete foundations for the dam had been laid, and quite a lot of puddling had been completed. Ancillary work included the erection of a new chapel, Capel Bethel, to replace the one at Cwm Taf, which would be flooded when the reservoir was filled, and the diversion of the Brecon Road further to the east from below the dam site northwards to Abercar. Despite the fact that the work stopped on orders from HM Treasury, Nott started litigation as he was unhappy with the settlement he received. He died on 4 July 1916, but the Scottish civil engineer Robert Brodie was a good friend of the family, and continued the dispute throughout the war. It went to arbitration, but the Corporation appealed against the outcome, and the House of Lords finally decided in favour of the contractor in 1918. The costs of the case amounted to around £25,000, of which the Corporation had to pay £20,000.

=== Post-war construction ===
Having resolved to settle Nott's claim in January 1919, the Corporation decided to finish the reservoir using direct labour, and negotiated with Brodie, Nott's executor, to buy some of his plant, for which they paid £3,750. This included one of his six locomotives, Tuxford, which was repaired in July 1919 and put to work, after which it was joined by the second-hand Nelson. A new locomotive shed to house most of the six locomotives that worked on the railway during the Corporation era was completed in July 1919. It was located below the dam, and a locomotive shed was also built at the quarry, while one locomotive was normally kept in the shed at Cefn yard. Three second-hand four-wheeled coaches arrived in May 1920. The Corporation had bought the Cwm Taf estate from Lord Tredegar in the autumn of 1914, which included Nant-ddu Lodge, just below the Cantref dam, and the railway was extended back to Cantref in 1922, to facilitate the construction of new filters there. A workman's train ran from Cefn each morning, calling at the quarry, the dam and Cantref filters, returning in the evening. Progress on the project was disrupted by a long strike by navvies in the second half of 1920, and a coal strike in early 1921.

Nott's accommodation huts were considered to be too basic by post-war standards, and so a new village was built to the west of the road to replace them. Work was made easier by the arrival of a steam navvy in May 1920, and another in January 1921, both of which worked on the bed of the reservoir. Near to Christmas 1921, Priestley, who was now 67, was given a closed Ford car to replace the open model which was not suitable for the cold and wet weather, although it did not arrive until 2 March 1922. In December 1921, the Corporation also decided they would run a school train to enable children from Llwyn-onn to get to Cefn yard in the morning and back in the afternoon. A missioner from the Navvy Mission Society took up residence in February 1922, arriving from the Blaen-y-Cwm reservoir at Beaufort, where work had recently finished.

Construction of the valve shaft began in July 1921, using stone imported from the Forest of Dean. The railway was extended into the bottom of the reservoir in early 1922, so that deliveries of stone to clad the inside face of the dam could be made more easily. The restoration of the link to Cantref was also completed in 1922, using a new route for part of it, to the west of the reservoir, and at a higher level than the original route that followed the valley floor. Beyond the top end of the reservoir, it re-joined the route that had been built in 1886. After a gap of nearly six years, puddling of the dam started again, but the clay was no longer obtained from Pen-yr-Heolgerrig, as a cheaper source was available near Neath, although deliveries by the contractor Stephens and Company were irregular, and clay was also obtained from Pengam. Supplies from both locations was delivered by rail, and 185 trucks of clay were delivered in the monthly period ending in mid-July 1922. A little over a year later, in the month to mid-October 1923, 175 wagons of clay were used in the construction, together with 2,187 cubic yards (1,672 m^{3}) of material in 486 wagon loads for building the bank.

By 1924, the steam navvies had done their job, and they were sold at auction, together with three of the locomotives. The Cantref filters were completed, and the railway from Llwyn-onn to Cantref was lifted in April 1926, while Priestley retired in the same month. He had served the Waterworks Committee for 31 years, and was then aged 72. The Corporation were originally going to employ James Watson as the engineer for the project, who had designed a reservoir system for Bradford Corporation in the Nidd Valley, but he died before being appointed, and Priestley had taken up the role. Impounding of water in the reservoir began on 23 June 1926, when the Lord Mayor of Cardiff, Alderman W P Francis, partially closed the valves, and Cantref filters were inaugurated on the same day. Several auctions took place between then and 1928, at which surplus equipment was sold. Water levels in the reservoir reached their full height in November 1926, but formal commissioning did not take place until May 1927. The contractors village and workshops at Llwyn-onn were removed in May 1928, and the railway down to Cefn may have been removed in early 1928, although there is also a suggestion that it was sold to T W Ward Ltd in 1930, in order that they might remove it. The reservoir is fed by the Afon Taf Fawr, and the smaller tributaries of the Nant Gwinau, Nant Car and Garwnant.

=== Locomotives ===
Louis Nott is known to have brought at least six locomotives to Llwyn-onn during the early phase of the project. All had previously worked at Birkenhead, where he had built a dry dock for Cammell Laird. Three may have been requisitioned by the Ministry of Munitions during the First World War. After Nott died in 1916, Robert Brodie traded as Executor of L P Nott, and then Nott, Brodie. Brodie's companies re-purchased two of the locomotives.

- Chepstow: 0-6-0 saddle tank, Manning Wardle 738 of 1881. May have gone to the Ministry of Munitions.
- Norman: 0-6-0 saddle tank, Hunslet 454 of 1888. Subsequently worked at Eastleigh aerodrome, and then possibly for the Ministry of Munitions.
- Sharpness: 0-6-0 side tank, Sharp Stewart 3472 of 1888. May have gone to the Ministry of Munitions. Bought by Brodie in 1922 for use on the construction of Avonmouth Portway.
- Tuxford: 0-6-0 saddle tank, Hunslet 579 of 1893. Remained on site into Corporation era.
- Liverpool: 0-4-0 saddle tank, Manning Wardle 1518 of 1901. Bought by Robert McAlpine & Sons in 1917.
- Tranmere: 0-6-0 saddle tank, Hudswell Clarke 654 of 1903. Subsequently used on an ordnance factory project and then bought by Brodie in 1918 for use on the Blaen-y-Cwm reservoir and other projects.

When Cardiff Corporation restarted the project in 1919, they acquired one locomotive from Nott's executors, two second-hand ones, and bought three new ones.

- Tuxford: 0-6-0 saddle tank, Hunslet 579 of 1893. Acquired from Nott's executors. Repairs were made to it in 1919, but it was then mounted on blocks at Llwyn-onn, to supply steam to a pump.
- Nelson: 0-6-0 saddle tank, Kitson 1786 of 1871. It was driven from J F Wake's yard in Darlingon in September 1919. Some time after 1921, it was also mounted on blocks to power a stationary pump.
- Dan-y-Graig: 0-6-0 saddle tank, Manning Wardle 835 of 1882. Brought from Swansea in July 1920. Later worked at the shipbreaking yard of T W Ward at Briton Ferry until the 1930s.
- Llwyn-onn: 0-6-0 saddle tank, Hudswell Clarke 1429 of 1920. Bought new. Some teething problems had to be fixed by the manufacturer. Sold to the dealers T W Ward of Sheffield on 30 September 1927, and finally scrapped around 1957 at Felsted in Essex.
- Cwm Taff: 0-6-0 saddle tank, Hudswell Clarke 1466 of 1921. Sold to the dealers T W Ward of Sheffield on 30 September 1927, and subsequently worked at various locations, including the Ewden Valley Waterworks for Sheffield Corporation.
- Abernant: 0-6-0 saddle tank, Manning Wardle 2015 of 1921. Sold to the dealers T W Ward of Sheffield on 30 September 1927. Worked at the Austin Motor Company at Longbridge until 1963, and was then moved to a children's playground in Birmingham. Subsequently preserved, and was awaiting restoration at the Great Central Railway (Nottingham) in 2012.

== Recreation ==
To the east of the reservoir is the 462 metres (1,516 ft) mountain of Garn Ddu, and to the west is the 485 metres (1,591 ft) mountain of Cadair Fawr. There are a variety of guided walks and waymarked paths. Environmental sculptures can be found on the Wern and Willow walks. The Taff Trail path links Cefn-coed-y-cymmer to Brecon. There is one bird hide.

In 2020, Welsh Water blocked off lay-bys around the Llwyn Onn reservoir because of persistent complaints about them being used for antisocial behaviour such as dogging.

== Bibliography ==
- Bowtell, Harold D; Hill, Geoffrey (2006). Reservoir Builders of South Wales. Industrial Railway Society. ISBN 978-0-9540726-2-9.
- IRS (2012). Industrial Locomotives (Handbook 16EL). Industrial Locomotive Society. ISBN 978-1-901556-79-7.
- Timelines (2020). "Cardiff Water Supply". Engineering Timelines. Archived from the original on 19 August 2020.
- Wheatley, Joseph Larke (1905). History of the Cardiff Corporation Waterworks Undertaking. British History Online.
