= Reservoir =

Storage space for water

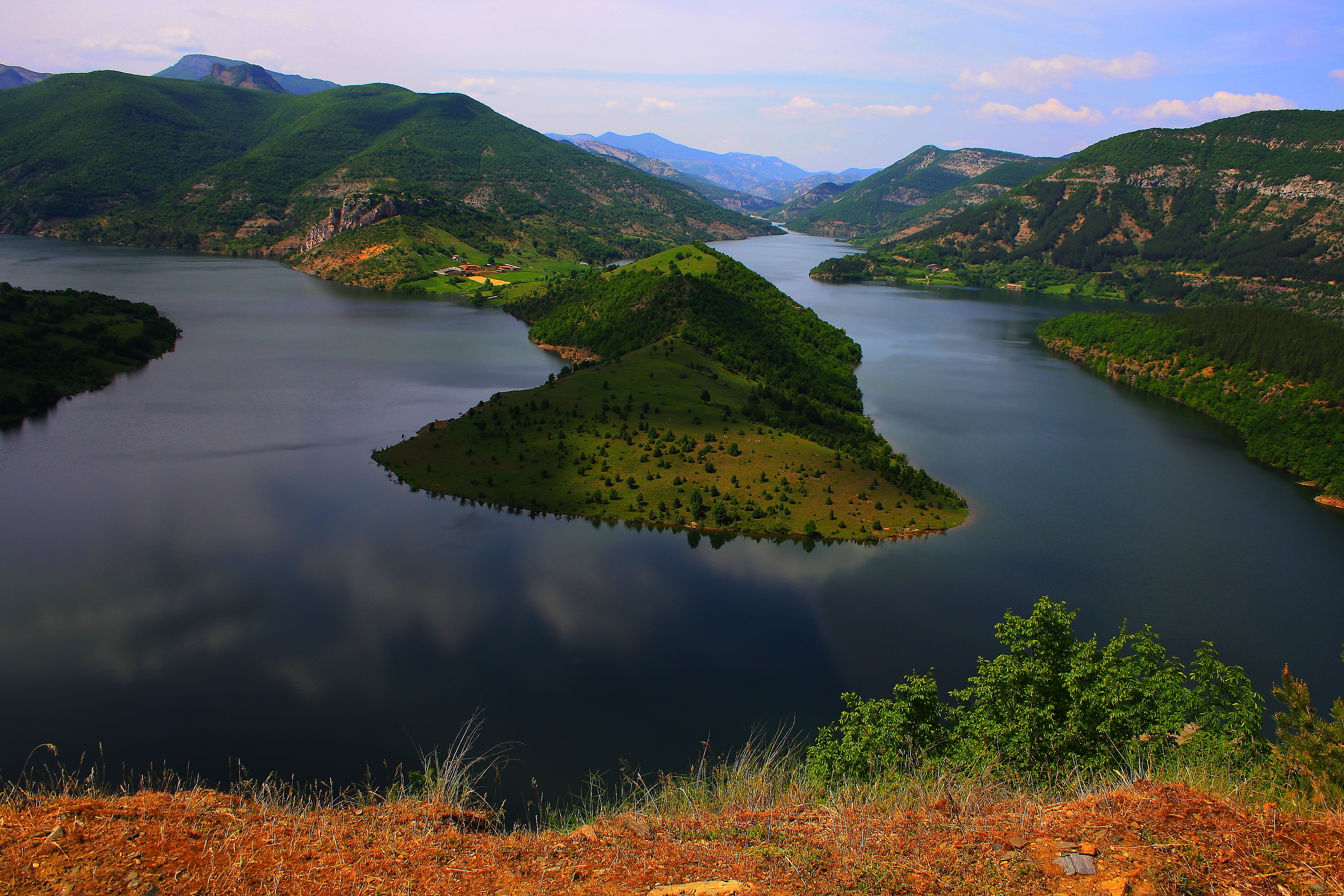
Kardzali Reservoir in Bulgaria is a reservoir in the Rhodope Mountains.

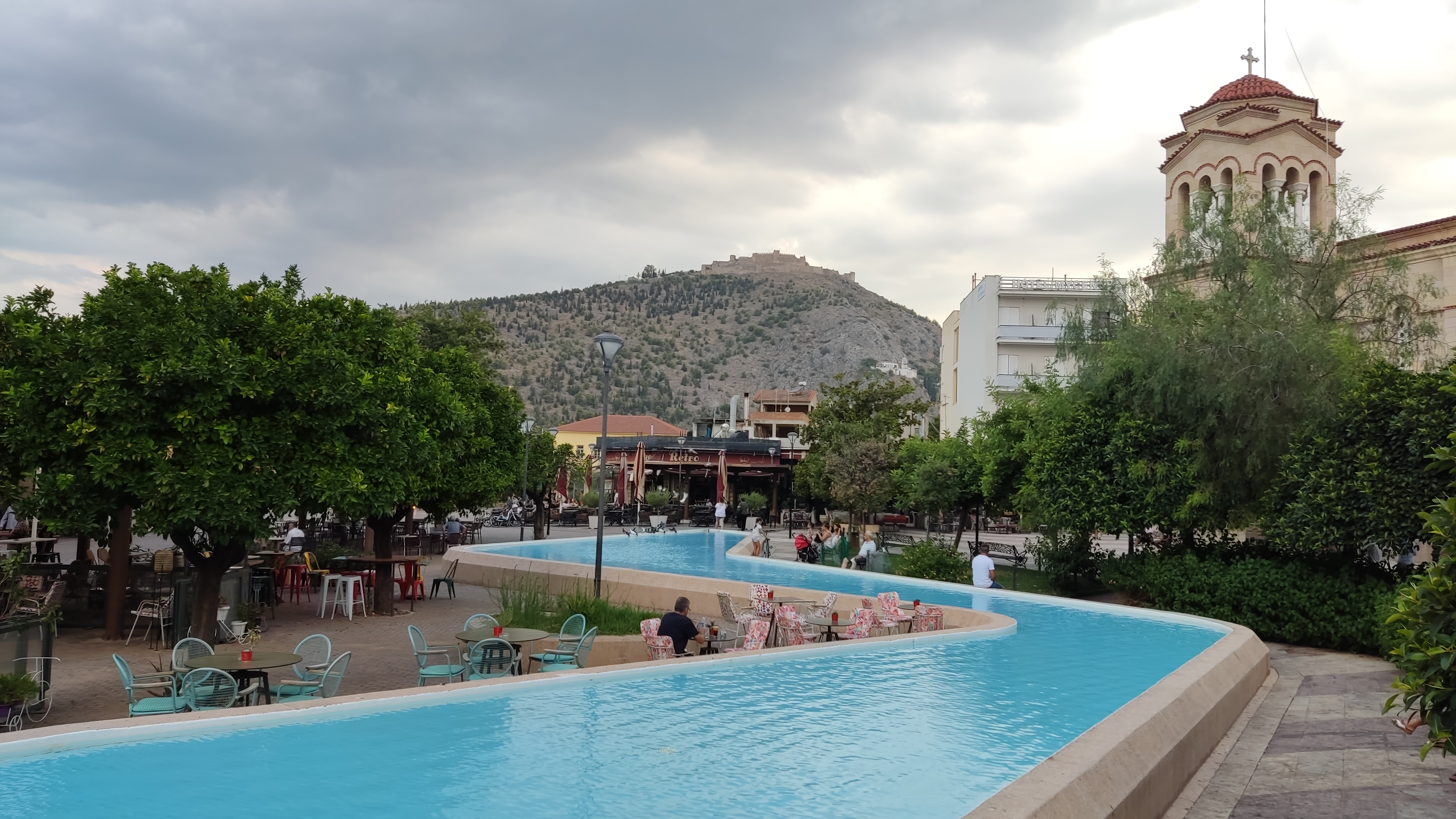
Some reservoirs such as this in Argos, Peloponnese are made for recreational purposes, rather than storing fresh water.

A reservoir (/ˈrɛzərvwɑːr/; from French réservoir [ʁezɛʁvwaʁ]) is an enlarged lake behind a dam, usually built to store fresh water, often doubling for hydroelectric power generation.

Reservoirs are created by controlling a watercourse that drains an existing body of water, interrupting a watercourse to form an embayment within it, excavating, or building any number of retaining walls or levees to enclose any area to store water.

== Types ==
=== Dammed valleys ===
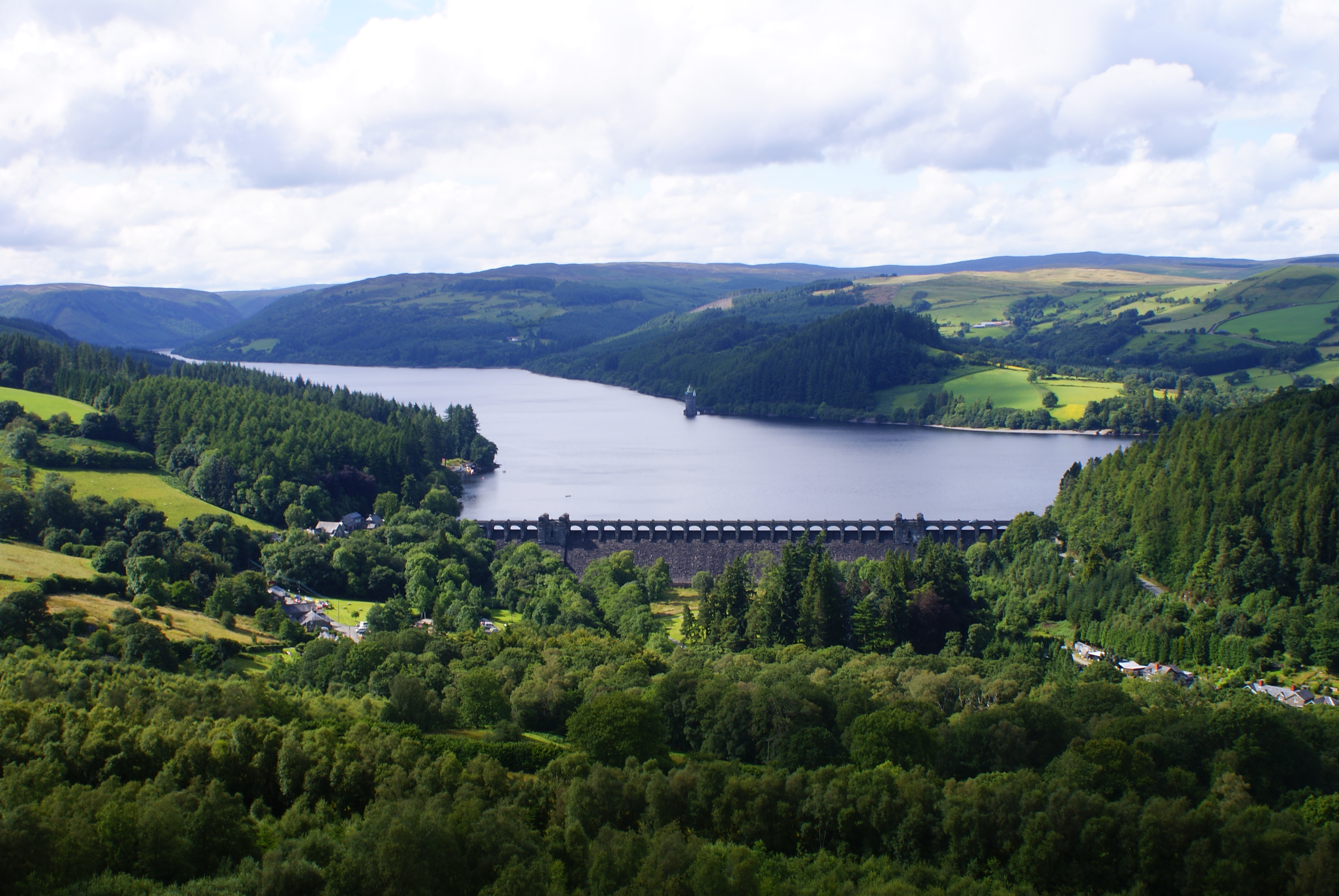
Lake Vyrnwy Reservoir. The dam spans the Vyrnwy Valley and was the first large stone dam built in the United Kingdom.

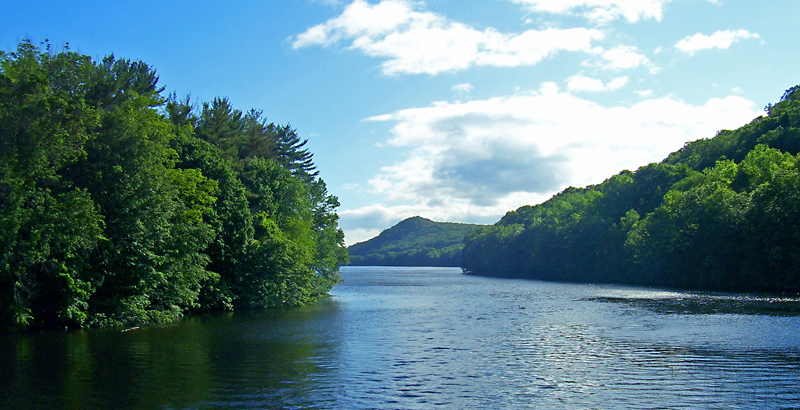
The East Branch Reservoir, part of the New York City water supply system, is formed by impounding the eastern tributary of the Croton River.

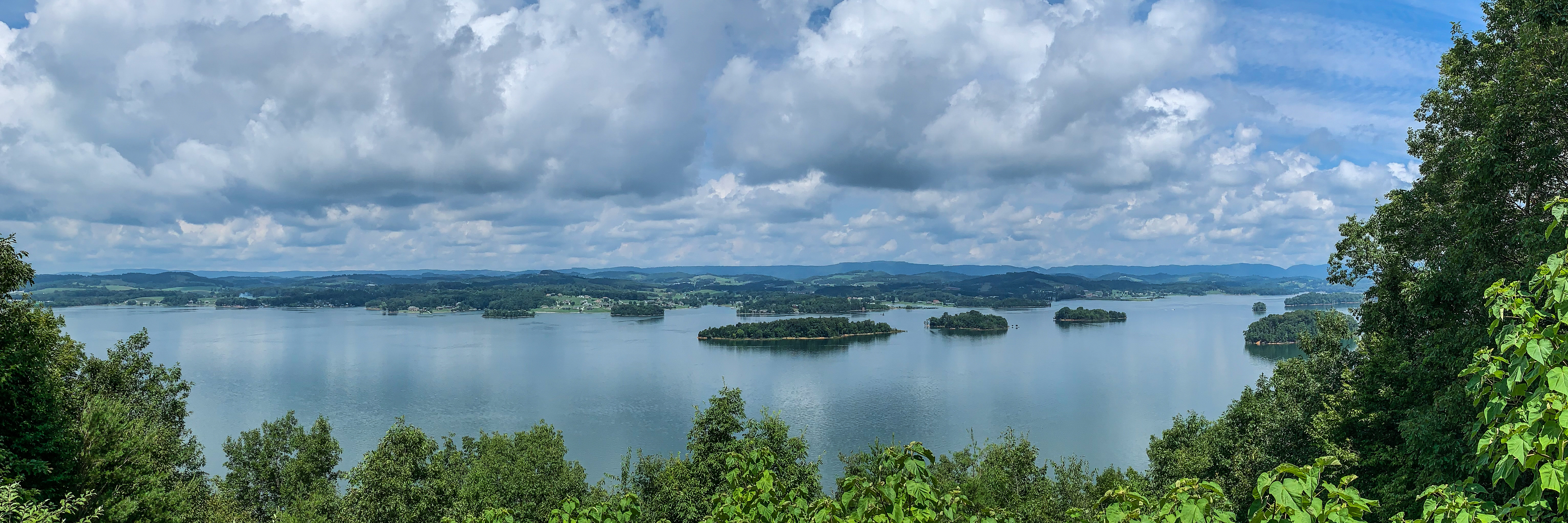
Cherokee Reservoir in Tennessee. It was formed after the impounding of the Holston River Valley by the Tennessee Valley Authority in 1941 as a part of the New Deal's efforts to bring electricity to the Tennessee Valley.

Dammed reservoirs are artificial lakes created and controlled by a dam constructed across a valley and rely on the natural topography to provide most of the basin of the reservoir. These reservoirs can either be on-stream reservoirs, which are located on the original streambed of the downstream river and are filled by creeks, rivers or rainwater that runs off the surrounding forested catchments, or off-stream reservoirs, which receive diverted water from a nearby stream or aqueduct or pipeline water from other on-stream reservoirs.

Dams are typically located at a narrow part of a downstream of a natural basin. The valley sides act as natural walls, with the dam located at the narrowest practical point to provide strength and the lowest cost of construction. In many reservoir construction projects, people have to be moved and re-housed, historical artifacts moved or rare environments relocated. Examples include the temples of Abu Simbel (which were moved before the construction of the Aswan Dam to create Lake Nasser from the Nile in Egypt), the relocation of the village of Capel Celyn during the construction of Llyn Celyn, and the relocation of Borgo San Pietro of Petrella Salto during the construction of Lago del Salto.

Construction of a dammed reservoir will usually require the river to be diverted during part of the build, often through a temporary tunnel or by-pass channel.

In hilly regions, reservoirs are often constructed by enlarging existing lakes. Sometimes in such reservoirs, the new top water level exceeds the watershed height on one or more of the feeder streams such as at the Clywedog Reservoir in Mid Wales. In such cases additional side dams are required to contain the reservoir.

Where the topography is poorly suited to forming a single large reservoir, a number of smaller reservoirs may be constructed in a chain, as in the River Taff valley where the Llwyn-onn, Cantref and Beacons Reservoirs form a chain up the valley.

=== Coastal ===
Coastal reservoirs are fresh water storage reservoirs located on the sea coast near a river mouth to store the flood water of a river. As the land-based reservoir construction is fraught with substantial land submergence, coastal reservoirs are preferred economically and technically since they do not use scarce land area. Many coastal reservoirs were constructed in Asia and Europe. Saemanguem in South Korea, Marina Barrage in Singapore, Qingcaosha in China, and Plover Cove in Hong Kong are a few such coastal reservoirs.

Aerial view of Plover Cove coastal reservoir

=== Bank-side ===
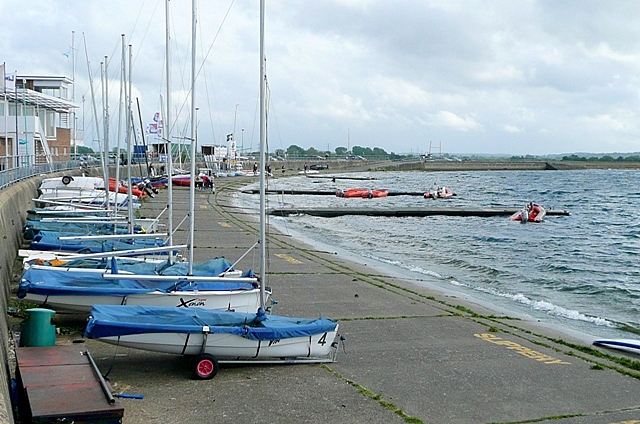
The Queen Mother Reservoir in Berkshire, England is an example of a bank-side reservoir; its water is pumped from the River Thames.

Where water is pumped or siphoned from a river of variable quality or size, bank-side reservoirs may be built to store the water. Such reservoirs are usually formed partly by excavation and partly by building a complete encircling bund or embankment, which may exceed 6 km (4 miles) in circumference. Both the floor of the reservoir and the bund must have an impermeable lining or core: initially these were often made of puddled clay, but this has generally been superseded by the modern use of rolled clay. The water stored in such reservoirs may stay there for several months, during which time normal biological processes may substantially reduce many contaminants and reduce turbidity. The use of bank-side reservoirs also allows water abstraction to be stopped for some time, for instance when the river is unacceptably polluted or when flow conditions are very low due to drought. The London water supply system exhibits one example of the use of bank-side storage: here water is taken from the River Thames and River Lea into several large Thames-side reservoirs, such as Queen Mary Reservoir that can be seen along the approach to London Heathrow Airport.

=== Service ===
Service reservoirs store fully treated potable water close to the point of distribution. Many service reservoirs are constructed as water towers, often as elevated structures on concrete pillars where the landscape is relatively flat. Other service reservoirs can be storage pools, water tanks or sometimes entirely underground cisterns, especially in more hilly or mountainous country. Modern reserviors will often use geomembrane liners on their base to limit seepage and/or as floating covers to limit evaporation, particularly in arid climates. In the United Kingdom, Thames Water has many underground reservoirs built in the 1800s, most of which are lined with brick. One example of this is the Honor Oak Reservoir in London, constructed between 1901 and 1909. When it was completed it was said to be the largest brick built underground reservoir in the world and it is still one of the largest in Europe. This reservoir now forms part of the southern extension of the Thames Water Ring Main. The top of the reservoir has been grassed over and is now used by the Aquarius Golf Club.

Service reservoirs perform several functions, including ensuring sufficient head of water in the water distribution system and providing water capacity to even-out peak demand from consumers, enabling the treatment plant to run at optimum efficiency. Large service reservoirs can also be managed to reduce the cost of pumping by refilling the reservoir at times of day when energy costs are low.

=== Irrigation reservoir ===
An irrigation reservoir is a water reservoir for agricultural use. They are filled using pumped groundwater, pumped river water or water runoff and are typically used during the local dry season.

The specific debate about substitution reservoirs is part of a broader discussion related to reservoirs used for agricultural irrigation, regardless of their type, and a certain model of intensive agriculture. Opponents view these reservoirs as a monopolization of resources benefiting only a few, representing an outdated model of productive agriculture. They argue that these reservoirs lead to a loss in both quantity and quality of water necessary for maintaining ecological balance and pose a risk of increasing severity and duration of droughts due to climate change. In summary, they consider it a misadaptation to climate change.

Proponents of reservoirs or substitution reserves, on the other hand, see them as a solution for sustainable agriculture while waiting for a truly durable agricultural model. Without such reserves, they fear that unsustainable imported irrigation will be inevitable. They believe that these reservoirs should be accompanied by a territorial project that unites all water stakeholders with the goal of preserving and enhancing natural environments.

Two main types of reservoirs can be distinguished based on their mode of supply.

Reservoir Type	Source of Supply	Period of Supply
Irrigation reservoir	River or alluvial aquifer	Outside the low-water period
Irrigation reservoir	Pumping from an aquifer	
Stream reservoir	only water runoff	All year

== History ==
Circa 3000 BC, the craters of extinct volcanoes in Arabia were used as reservoirs by farmers for their irrigation water.

Dry climate and water scarcity in India led to early development of stepwells and other water resource management techniques, including the building of a reservoir at Girnar in 3000 BC. Artificial lakes dating to the 5th century BC have been found in ancient Greece. The artificial Bhojsagar lake in present-day Madhya Pradesh state of India, constructed in the 11th century, covered 650 square kilometres (250 sq mi).

The Kingdom of Kush invented the Hafir, a type of reservoir, during the Meroitic period. 800 ancient and modern hafirs have been registered in the Meroitic town of Butana. The Hafirs catch the water during rainy seasons in order to ensure water is available for several months during dry seasons to supply drinking water, irrigate fields and water cattle. The Great Reservoir near the Lion Temple in Musawwarat es-Sufra is a notable hafir in Kush.

In Sri Lanka, large reservoirs were created by ancient Sinhalese kings in order to store water for irrigation. The famous Sri Lankan king Parākramabāhu I of Sri Lanka said "Do not let a drop of water seep into the ocean without benefiting mankind." He created the reservoir named Parakrama Samudra ("sea of King Parakrama"). Vast artificial reservoirs were also built by various ancient kingdoms in Bengal, Assam, and Cambodia.

In Yemen, the Marib Dam, which was first constructed c. 800 BCE by the Sabaean kingdom in Marib, held a reservoir until 575 CE, when it was breached and repair work was abandoned.

== Uses ==
=== Direct water supply ===
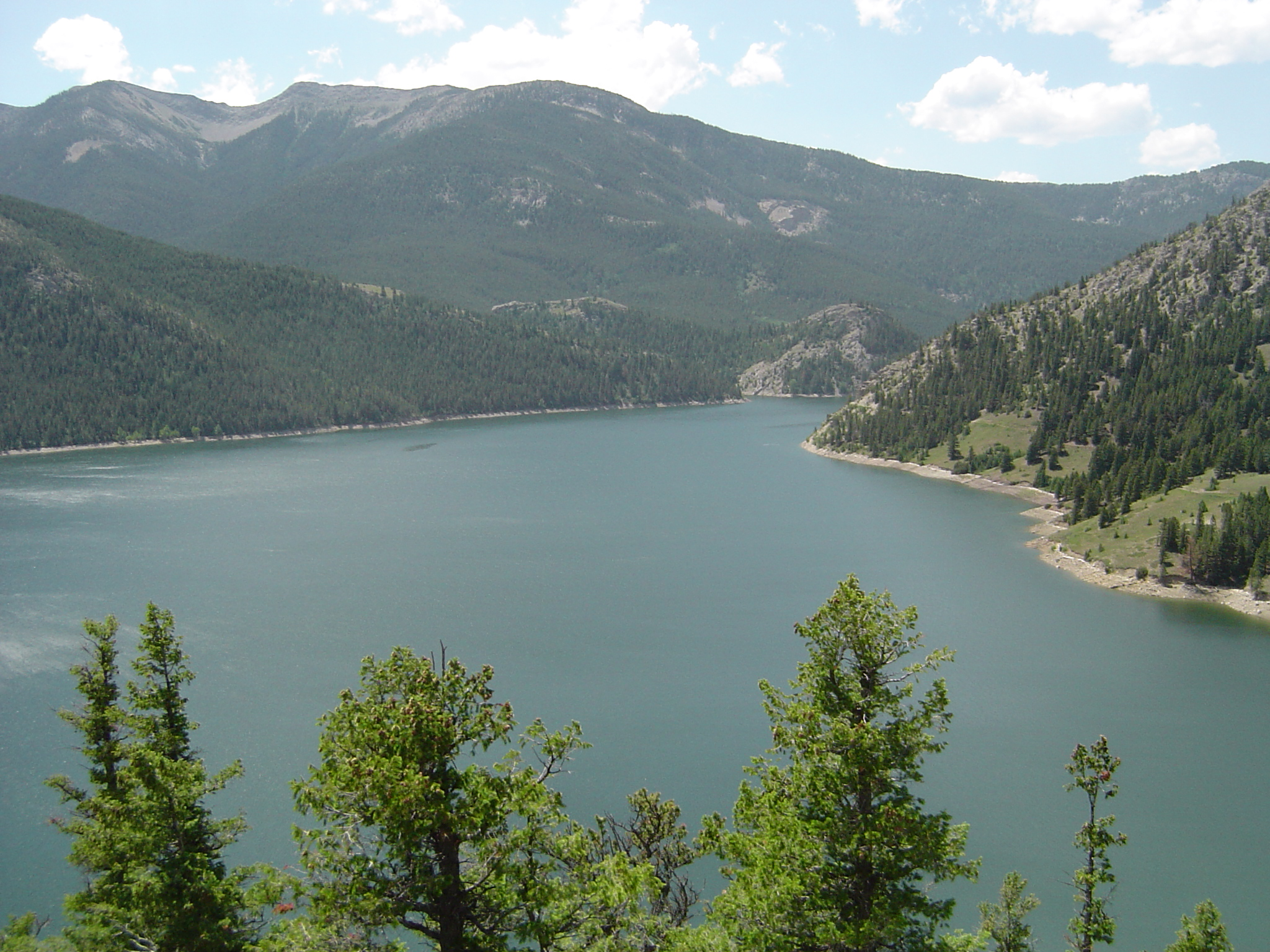
Gibson Reservoir, Montana

Many dammed river reservoirs and most bank-side reservoirs are used to provide the raw water feed to a water treatment plant which delivers drinking water through water mains. The reservoir does not merely hold water until it is needed: it can also be the first part of the water treatment process. The time the water is held before it is released is known as the retention time. This is a design feature that allows particles and silts to settle out, as well as time for natural biological treatment using algae, bacteria and zooplankton that naturally live in the water. However natural limnological processes in temperate climate lakes produce temperature stratification in the water, which tends to partition some elements such as manganese and phosphorus into deep, cold anoxic water during the summer months. In the autumn and winter the lake becomes fully mixed again. During drought conditions, it is sometimes necessary to draw down the cold bottom water, and the elevated levels of manganese in particular can cause problems in water treatment plants.

=== Hydroelectricity ===
Hydroelectric dam in cross section

In 2005, about 25% of the world's 33,105 large dams (over 15 metres in height) were used for hydroelectricity. The U.S. produces 3% of its electricity from 80,000 dams of all sizes. An initiative is underway to retrofit more dams as a good use of existing infrastructure to provide many smaller communities with a reliable source of energy. A reservoir generating hydroelectricity includes turbines connected to the retained water body by large-diameter pipes. These generating sets may be at the base of the dam or some distance away. In a flat river valley a reservoir needs to be deep enough to create a head of water at the turbines; and if there are periods of drought the reservoir needs to hold enough water to average out the river's flow throughout the year(s). Run-of-the-river hydro in a steep valley with constant flow needs no reservoir.

Some reservoirs generating hydroelectricity use pumped recharge: a high-level reservoir is filled with water using high-performance electric pumps at times when electricity demand is low, and then uses this stored water to generate electricity by releasing the stored water into a low-level reservoir when electricity demand is high. Such systems are called pump-storage schemes.

=== Controlling watersources ===
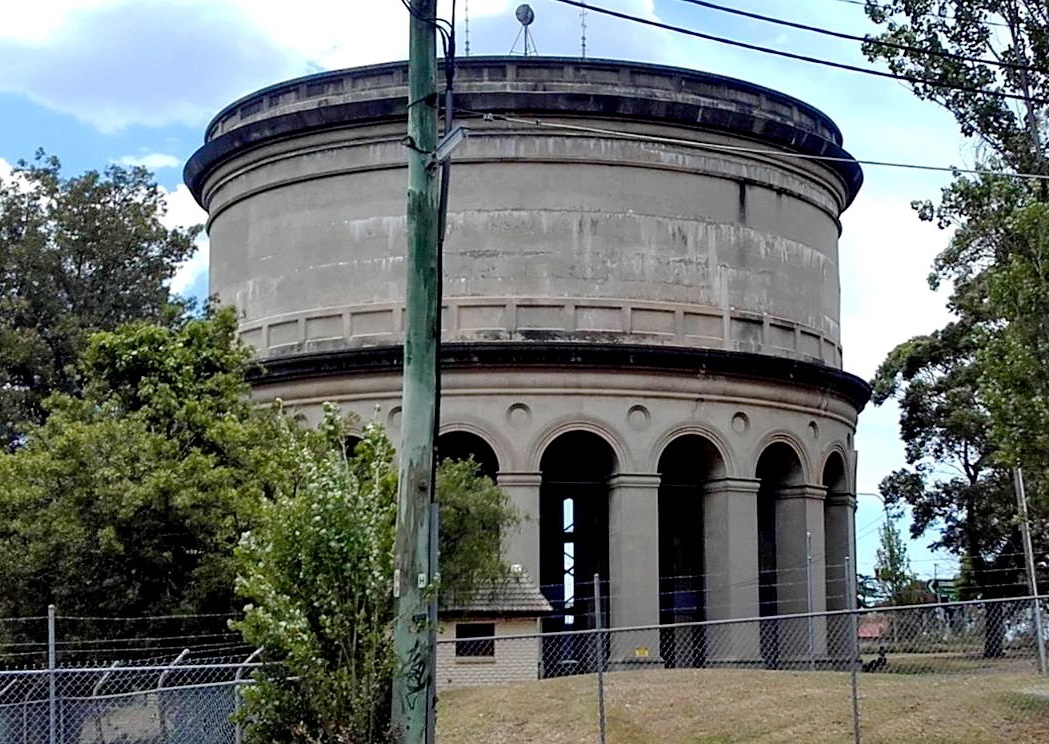
Bankstown Reservoir in Sydney

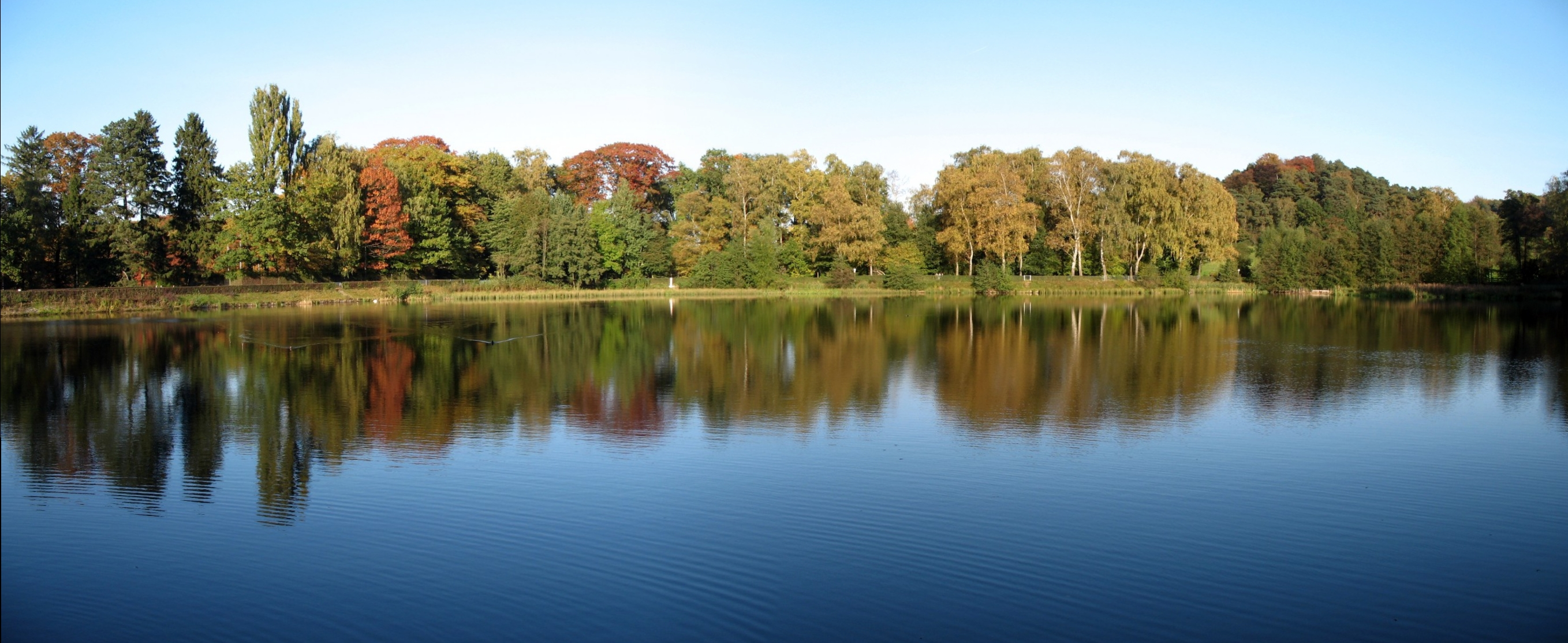
Recreational-only Kupferbach reservoir near Aachen, Germany

Reservoirs can be used in a number of ways to control how water flows through downstream waterways:

Downstream water supply
water may be released from an upland reservoir so that it can be abstracted for drinking water lower down the system, sometimes hundreds of miles further downstream.
Irrigation
water in an irrigation reservoir may be released into networks of canals for use in farmlands or secondary water systems. Irrigation may also be supported by reservoirs which maintain river flows, allowing water to be abstracted for irrigation lower down the river.
Flood control
also known as an "attenuation" or "balancing" reservoirs, flood control reservoirs collect water at times of very high rainfall, then release it slowly during the following weeks or months. Some of these reservoirs are constructed across the river line, with the onward flow controlled by an orifice plate. When river flow exceeds the capacity of the orifice plate, water builds up behind the dam; but as soon as the flow rate reduces, the water behind the dam is slowly released until the reservoir is empty again. In some cases, such reservoirs only function a few times in a decade, and the land behind the reservoir may be developed as community or recreational land. A new generation of balancing dams are being developed to combat the possible consequences of climate change. They are called "Flood Detention Reservoirs". Because these reservoirs will remain dry for long periods, there may be a risk of the clay core drying out, reducing its structural stability. Recent developments include the use of composite core fill made from recycled materials as an alternative to clay.
Canals
Where a natural watercourse's water is not available to be diverted into a canal, a reservoir may be built to guarantee the water level in the canal: for example, where a canal climbs through locks to cross a range of hills. Another use is to reduce costs or construction time when the canal must be dug through rock, as used on the Rideau Canal with The Narrows locks dividing the two Rideau's and essentially turning the upper Rideau into an enlarged reservoir, albeit only by two or three feet.
Recreation
water may be released from a reservoir to create or supplement white water conditions for kayaking and other white-water sports. On salmonid rivers special releases (in Britain called freshets) are made to encourage natural migration behaviours in fish and to provide a variety of fishing conditions for anglers.

=== Flow balancing ===
Reservoirs can be used to balance the flow in highly managed systems, taking in water during high flows and releasing it again during low flows. In order for this to work without pumping requires careful control of water levels using spillways. When a major storm approaches, the dam operators calculate the volume of water that the storm will add to the reservoir. If forecast storm water will overfill the reservoir, water is slowly let out of the reservoir prior to, and during, the storm. If done with sufficient lead time, the major storm will not fill the reservoir and areas downstream will not experience damaging flows. Accurate weather forecasts are essential so that dam operators can correctly plan drawdowns prior to a high rainfall event.

Dam operators blamed a faulty weather forecast on the 2010–2011 Queensland floods. Examples of highly managed reservoirs are Burrendong Dam in Australia and Llyn Tegid (Bala Lake) in North Wales. Llyn Tegid is a natural lake whose level was raised by a low dam and into which the River Dee flows or discharges depending upon flow conditions, as part of the River Dee regulation system. This mode of operation is a form of hydraulic capacitance in the river system.

=== Recreation ===
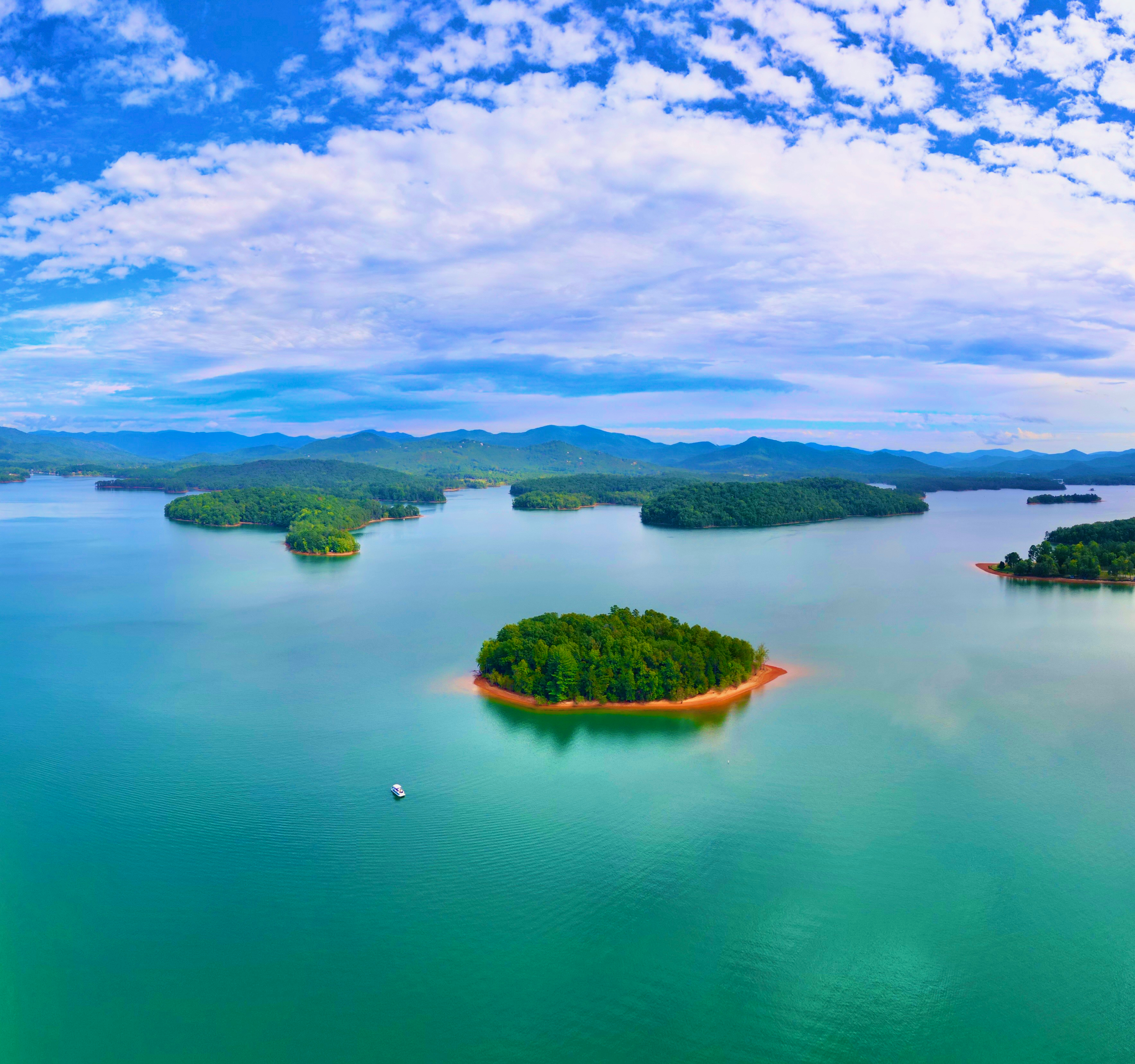
A boat on Chatuge Lake in North Carolina

Many reservoirs often allow some recreational uses, such as fishing and boating. Special rules may apply for the safety of the public and to protect the quality of the water and the ecology of the surrounding area. Many reservoirs now support and encourage less formal and less structured recreation such as natural history, bird watching, landscape painting, walking and hiking, and often provide information boards and interpretation material to encourage responsible use.

== Operation ==
Water falling as rain upstream of the reservoir, together with any groundwater emerging as springs, is stored in the reservoir. Any excess water can be spilled via a specifically designed spillway. Stored water may be piped by gravity for use as drinking water, to generate hydro-electricity or to maintain river flows to support downstream uses. Occasionally reservoirs can be managed to retain water during high rainfall events to prevent or reduce downstream flooding. Some reservoirs support several uses, and the operating rules may be complex.

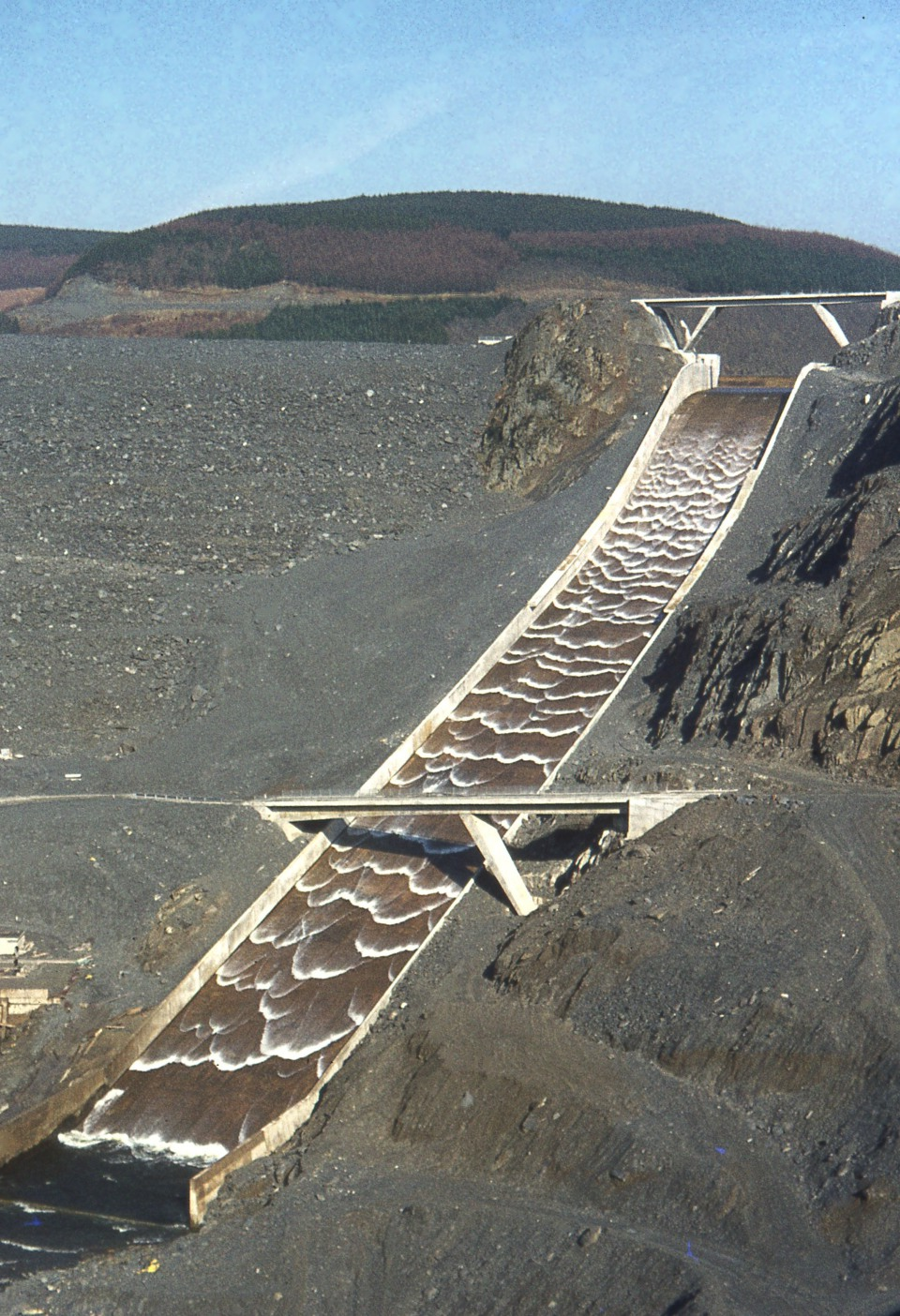
Spillway of Llyn Brianne dam in Wales

Most modern reservoirs have a specially designed draw-off tower that can discharge water from the reservoir at different levels, both to access water as the water level falls, and to allow water of a specific quality to be discharged into the downstream river as "compensation water": the operators of many upland or in-river reservoirs have obligations to release water into the downstream river to maintain river quality, support fisheries, to maintain downstream industrial and recreational uses or for a range of other purposes. Such releases are known as compensation water.

=== Terminology ===
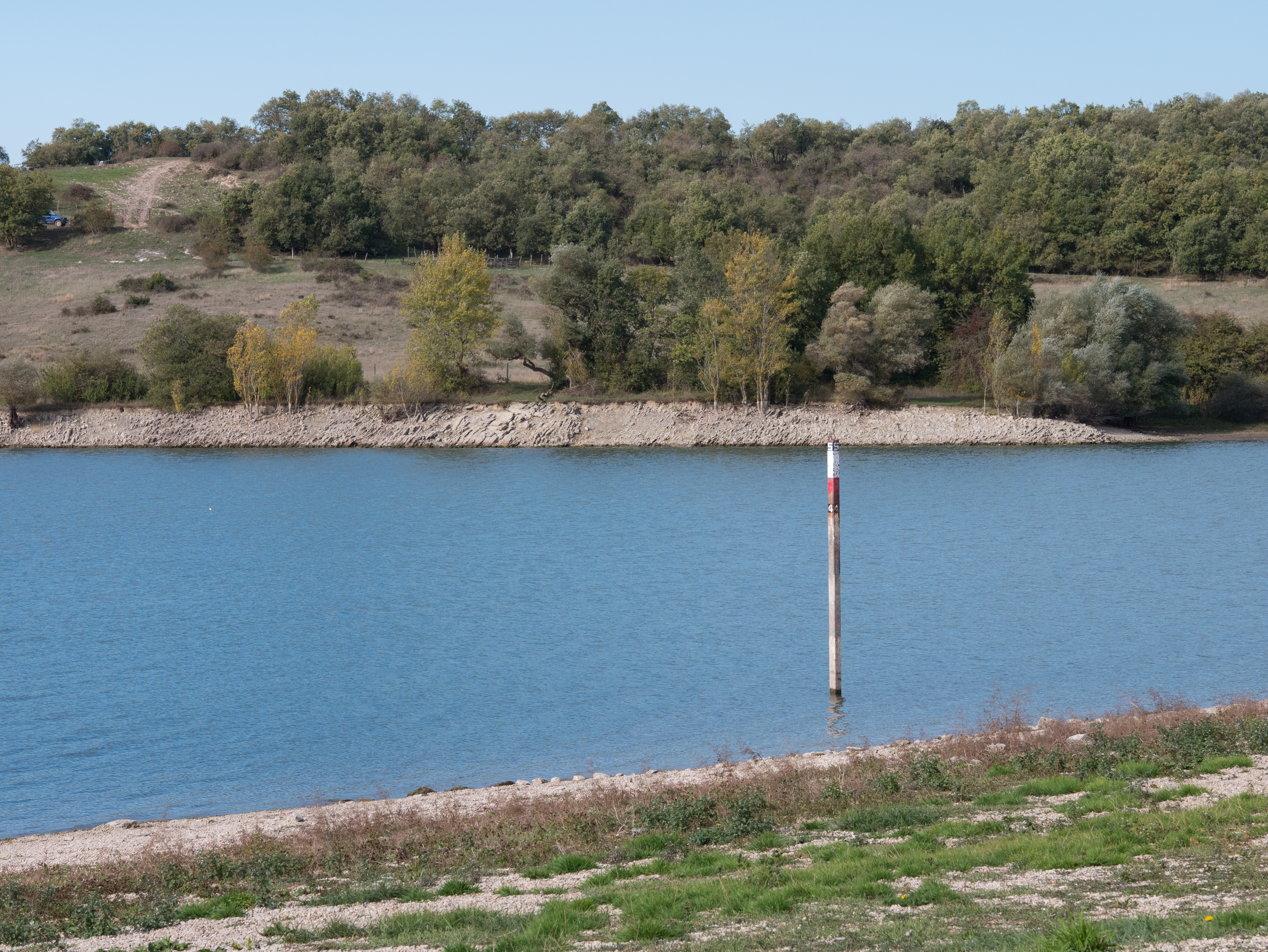
Water level marker in a reservoir

The units used for measuring reservoir areas and volumes vary from country to country. In most of the world, reservoir areas are expressed in square kilometers; in the United States, acres are commonly used. For volume, either cubic meters or cubic kilometers are widely used, with acre-feet used in the US.

The capacity, volume, or storage of a reservoir is usually divided into distinguishable areas. Dead or inactive storage refers to water in a reservoir that cannot be drained by gravity through a dam's outlet works, spillway, or power plant intake and can only be pumped out. Dead storage allows sediments to settle, which improves water quality and also creates an area for fish during low levels. Active or live storage is the portion of the reservoir that can be used for flood control, power production, navigation, and downstream releases. In addition, a reservoir's "flood control capacity" is the amount of water it can regulate during flooding. The "surcharge capacity" is the capacity of the reservoir above the spillway crest that cannot be regulated.

In the United States, the water below the normal maximum level of a reservoir is called the "conservation pool".

In the United Kingdom, "top water level" describes the reservoir full state, while "fully drawn down" describes the minimum retained volume.

=== Modelling reservoir management ===
There is a wide variety of software for modelling reservoirs, from the specialist Dam Safety Program Management Tools (DSPMT) to the relatively simple WAFLEX, to integrated models like the Water Evaluation And Planning system (WEAP) that place reservoir operations in the context of system-wide demands and supplies.

== Safety ==
Natural Resources Wales time-lapse video of the strengthening of the embankment of a small reservoir in Gwydir Forest, Wales

In many countries large reservoirs are closely regulated to try to prevent or minimize failures of containment.

While much of the effort is directed at the dam and its associated structures as the weakest part of the overall structure, the aim of such controls is to prevent an uncontrolled release of water from the reservoir. Reservoir failures can generate huge increases in flow down a river valley, with the potential to wash away towns and villages and cause considerable loss of life, such as the devastation following the failure of containment at Llyn Eigiau which killed 17 people.(see also List of dam failures)

A notable case of reservoirs being used as an instrument of war involved the British Royal Air Force Dambusters raid on Germany in World War II (codenamed "Operation Chastise"), in which three German reservoir dams were selected to be breached in order to damage German infrastructure and manufacturing and power capabilities deriving from the Ruhr and Eder rivers. The economic and social impact was derived from the enormous volumes of previously stored water that swept down the valleys, wreaking destruction. This raid later became the basis for several films.

== Environmental impact ==
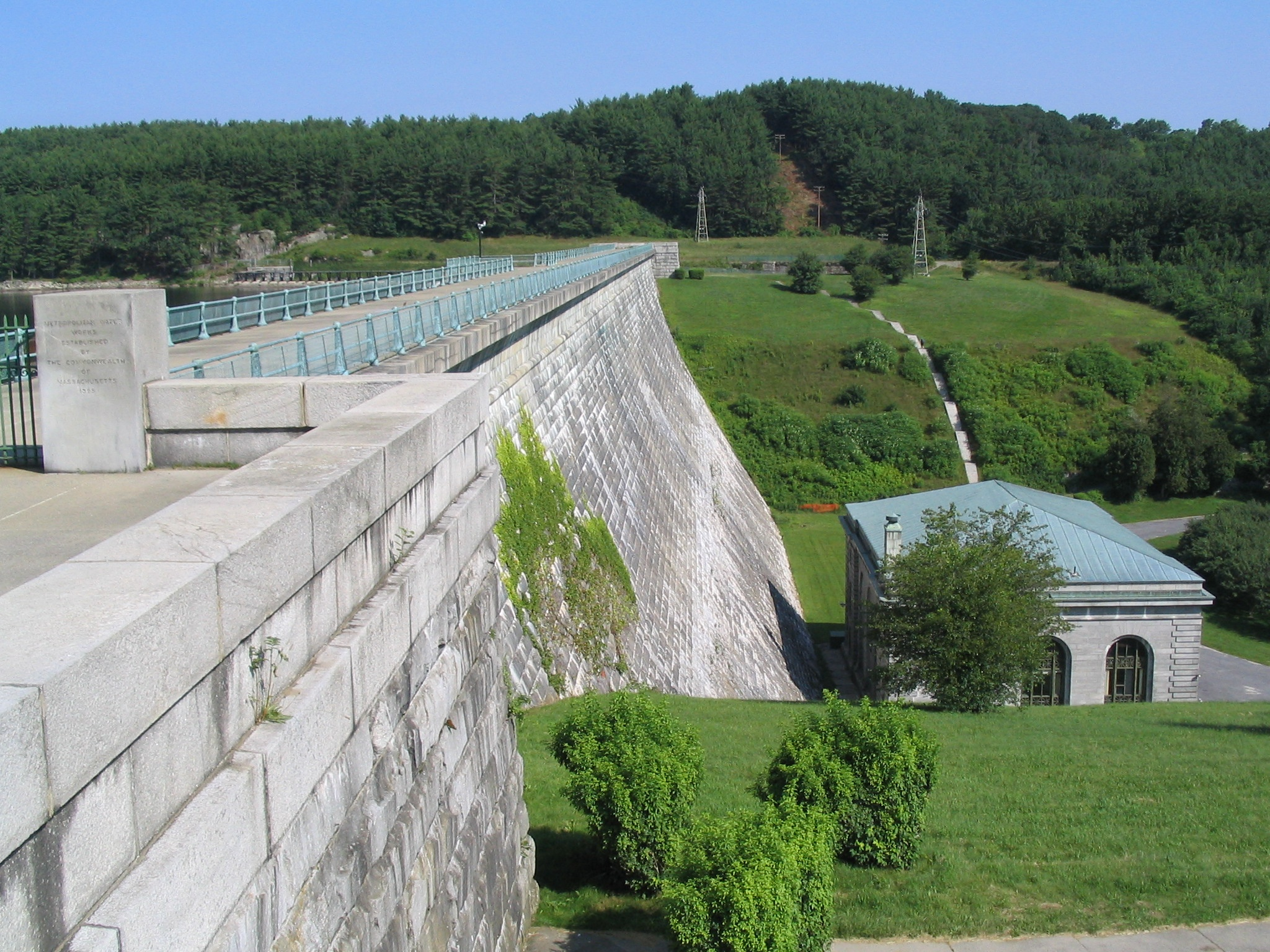
The Wachusett Dam in Clinton, Massachusetts

The environmental impact of reservoirs comes under ever-increasing scrutiny as the global demand for water and energy increases and the number and size of reservoirs increases.

Dams and reservoirs can be used to supply drinking water, generate hydroelectric power, increase the water supply for irrigation, provide recreational opportunities, and flood control. In 1960 the construction of Llyn Celyn and the flooding of Capel Celyn provoked political uproar which continues to this day. More recently, the construction of Three Gorges Dam and other similar projects throughout Asia, Africa and Latin America have generated considerable environmental and political debate. Currently, 48 percent of rivers and their hydro-ecological systems are affected by reservoirs and dams.

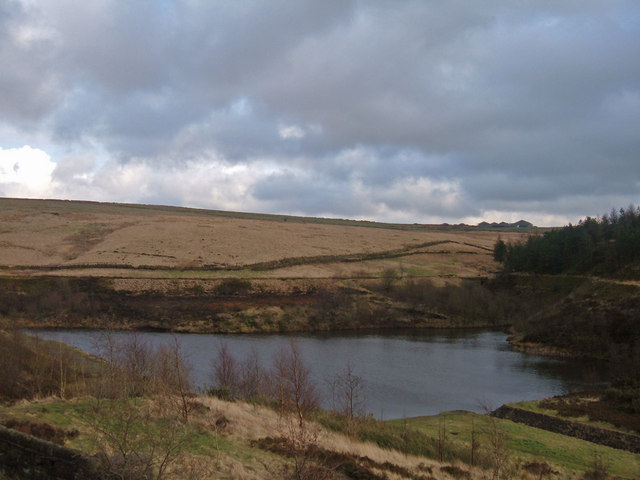
Brushes Clough Reservoir, located above Shaw and Crompton, England

=== Whole life environmental impact ===
All reservoirs will have a monetary cost/benefit assessment made before construction to see if the project is worth proceeding with. However, such analysis can often omit the environmental impacts of dams and the reservoirs that they contain. Some impacts, such as the greenhouse gas production associated with concrete manufacture, are relatively easy to estimate. Other impacts on the natural environment and social and cultural effects can be more difficult to assess and to weigh in the balance but identification and quantification of these issues is now commonly required in major construction projects in the developed world.

=== Climate change ===
==== Reservoir greenhouse gas emissions ====
Naturally occurring lakes receive organic sediments which decay in an anaerobic environment releasing methane and carbon dioxide. The methane released is approximately 8 times more potent as a greenhouse gas than carbon dioxide.

As a human-made reservoir fills, existing plants are submerged and during the years it takes for this matter to decay, will give off considerably more greenhouse gases than lakes do. A reservoir in a narrow valley or canyon may cover relatively little vegetation, while one situated on a plain may flood a great deal of vegetation. The site may be cleared of vegetation first or simply flooded. Tropical flooding can produce far more greenhouse gases than in temperate regions.

The following table indicates reservoir emissions in milligrams per square meter per day for different bodies of water.

Location	Carbon Dioxide	Methane
Lakes	700	9
Temperate reservoirs	1500	20
Tropical reservoirs	3000	100

==== Hydroelectricity and climate change ====
Depending upon the area flooded versus power produced, a reservoir built for hydro-electricity generation can either reduce or increase the net production of greenhouse gases when compared to other sources of power.

A study for the National Institute for Research in the Amazon found that hydroelectric reservoirs release a large pulse of carbon dioxide from decay of trees left standing in the reservoirs, especially during the first decade after flooding. This elevates the global warming impact of the dams to levels much higher than would occur by generating the same power from fossil fuels. According to the World Commission on Dams report (Dams And Development), when the reservoir is relatively large and no prior clearing of forest in the flooded area was undertaken, greenhouse gas emissions from the reservoir could be higher than those of a conventional oil-fired thermal generation plant. For instance, in 1990, the impoundment behind the Balbina Dam in Brazil (inaugurated in 1987) had over 20 times the impact on global warming than would generating the same power from fossil fuels, due to the large area flooded per unit of electricity generated. Another study published in the Global Biogeochemical Cycles also found that newly flooded reservoirs released more carbon dioxide and methane than the pre-flooded landscape, noting that forest lands, wetlands, and preexisting water features all released differing amounts of carbon dioxide and methane both pre- and post-flooding.

The Tucuruí Dam in Brazil (completed in 1984) had only 0.4 times the impact on global warming than would generating the same power from fossil fuels.

A two-year study of carbon dioxide and methane releases in Canada concluded that while the hydroelectric reservoirs there do emit greenhouse gases, it is on a much smaller scale than thermal power plants of similar capacity. Hydropower typically emits 35 to 70 times less greenhouse gases per TWh of electricity than thermal power plants.

A decrease in air pollution occurs when a dam is used in place of thermal power generation, since electricity produced from hydroelectric generation does not give rise to any flue gas emissions from fossil fuel combustion (including sulfur dioxide, nitric oxide and carbon monoxide from coal).

=== Biology ===
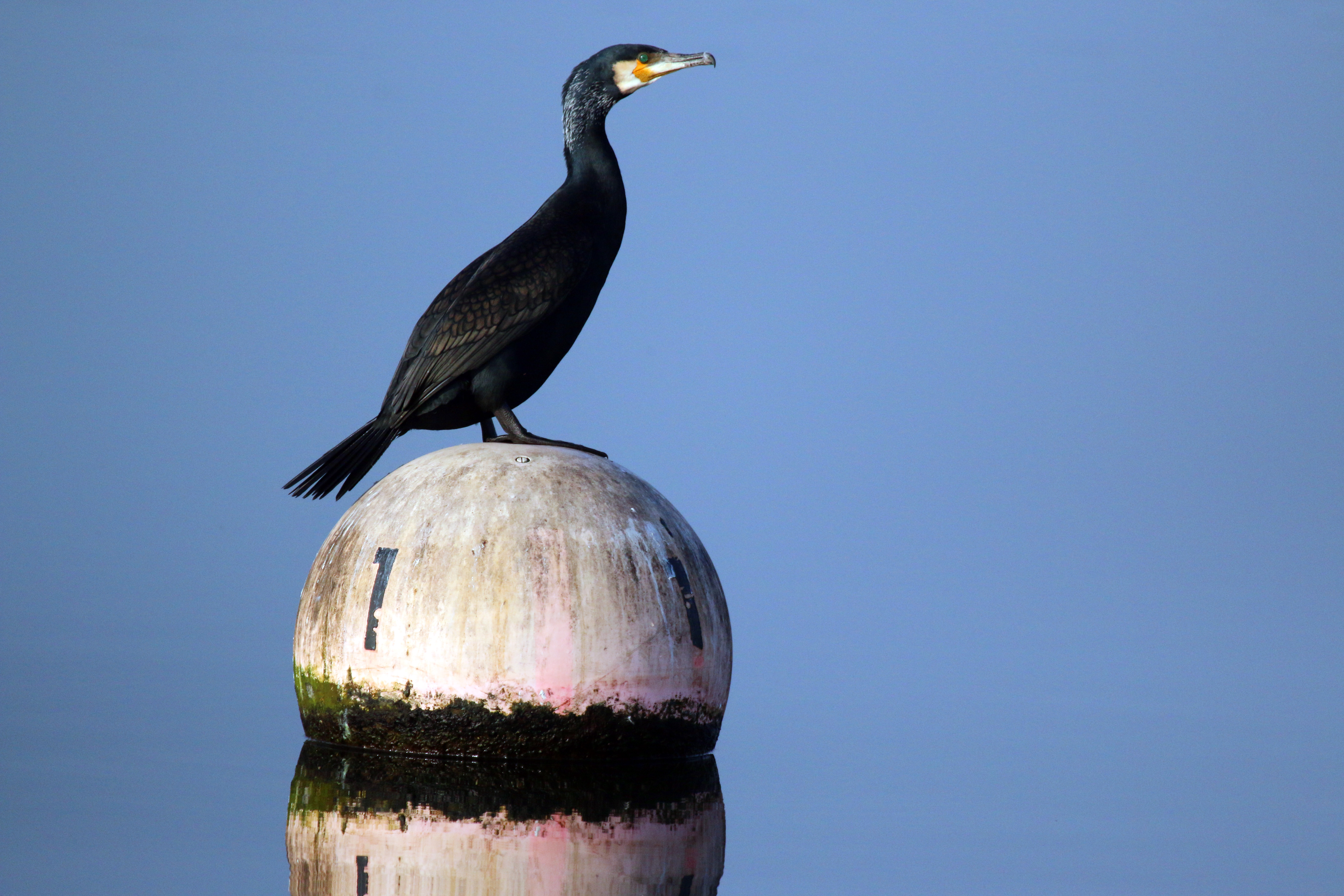
A great cormorant (Phalacrocorax carbo) perched on a buoy at Farmoor Reservoir, Oxfordshire. As reservoirs may contain stocks of fish, numerous water-bird species may rely on reservoirs and form habitats near them.

Dams can produce a block for migrating fish, trapping them in one area, producing food and a habitat for various water-birds. They can also flood various ecosystems on land and may cause extinctions.

Creating reservoirs can alter the natural biogeochemical cycle of mercury. After a reservoir's initial formation, there is a large increase in the production of toxic methylmercury (MeHg) via microbial methylation in flooded soils and peat. MeHg levels have also been found to increase in zooplankton and in fish.

The process of limnization, such as the creation of large reservoir cascades on major rivers, can inadvertently recreate historical hydrological conditions (e.g., Late Quaternary proglacial lakes) and generate numerous vacant ecological niches. This transformation often turns regulated rivers into highly effective invasion corridors, facilitating the rapid range expansion of eurybiontic species that are pre-adapted to lake-type habitats.

=== Human impact ===
Dams can severely reduce the amount of water reaching countries downstream of them, causing water stress between the countries, e.g. the Sudan and Egypt, which damages farming businesses in the downstream countries, and reduces drinking water.

Farms and villages, e.g. Ashopton can be flooded by the creation of reservoirs, ruining many livelihoods. For this very reason, worldwide 80 million people (figure is as of 2009, from the Edexcel GCSE Geography textbook) have had to be forcibly relocated due to dam construction.

=== Limnology ===
The limnology of reservoirs has many similarities to that of lakes of equivalent size. There are however significant differences. Many reservoirs experience considerable variations in level producing significant areas that are intermittently underwater or dried out. This greatly limits the productivity or the water margins and also limits the number of species able to survive in these conditions.

Upland reservoirs tend to have a much shorter residence time than natural lakes and this can lead to more rapid cycling of nutrients through the water body so that they are more quickly lost to the system. This may be seen as a mismatch between water chemistry and water biology with a tendency for the biological component to be more oligotrophic than the chemistry would suggest.

Conversely, lowland reservoirs drawing water from nutrient rich rivers, may show exaggerated eutrophic characteristics because the residence time in the reservoir is much greater than in the river and the biological systems have a much greater opportunity to utilise the available nutrients.

Deep reservoirs with multiple level draw off towers can discharge deep cold water into the downstream river greatly reducing the size of any hypolimnion. This in turn can reduce the concentrations of phosphorus released during any annual mixing event and may therefore reduce productivity.

The dams in front of reservoirs act as knickpoints-the energy of the water falling from them reduces and deposition is a result below the dams.

=== Seismicity ===
The filling (impounding) of reservoirs has often been attributed to reservoir-triggered seismicity (RTS) as seismic events have occurred near large dams or within their reservoirs in the past. These events may have been triggered by the filling or operation of the reservoir and are on a small scale when compared to the amount of reservoirs worldwide. Of over 100 recorded events, some early examples include the 60 m (197 ft) tall Marathon Dam in Greece (1929), the 221 m (725 ft) tall Hoover Dam in the U.S. (1935). Most events involve large dams and small amounts of seismicity. The only four recorded events above a 6.0-magnitude (M_{w}) are the 103 m (338 ft) tall Koyna Dam in India and the 120 m (394 ft) Kremasta Dam in Greece which both registered 6.3-M_{w}, the 122 m (400 ft) high Kariba Dam in Zambia at 6.25-M_{w} and the 105 m (344 ft) Xinfengjiang Dam in China at 6.1-M_{w}. Disputes have occurred regarding when RTS has occurred due to a lack of hydrogeological knowledge at the time of the event. It is accepted, though, that the infiltration of water into pores and the weight of the reservoir do contribute to RTS patterns. For RTS to occur, there must be a seismic structure near the dam or its reservoir and the seismic structure must be close to failure. Additionally, water must be able to infiltrate the deep rock stratum as the weight of a 100 m (328 ft) deep reservoir will have little impact when compared the deadweight of rock on a crustal stress field, which may be located at a depth of 10 km (6 mi) or more.

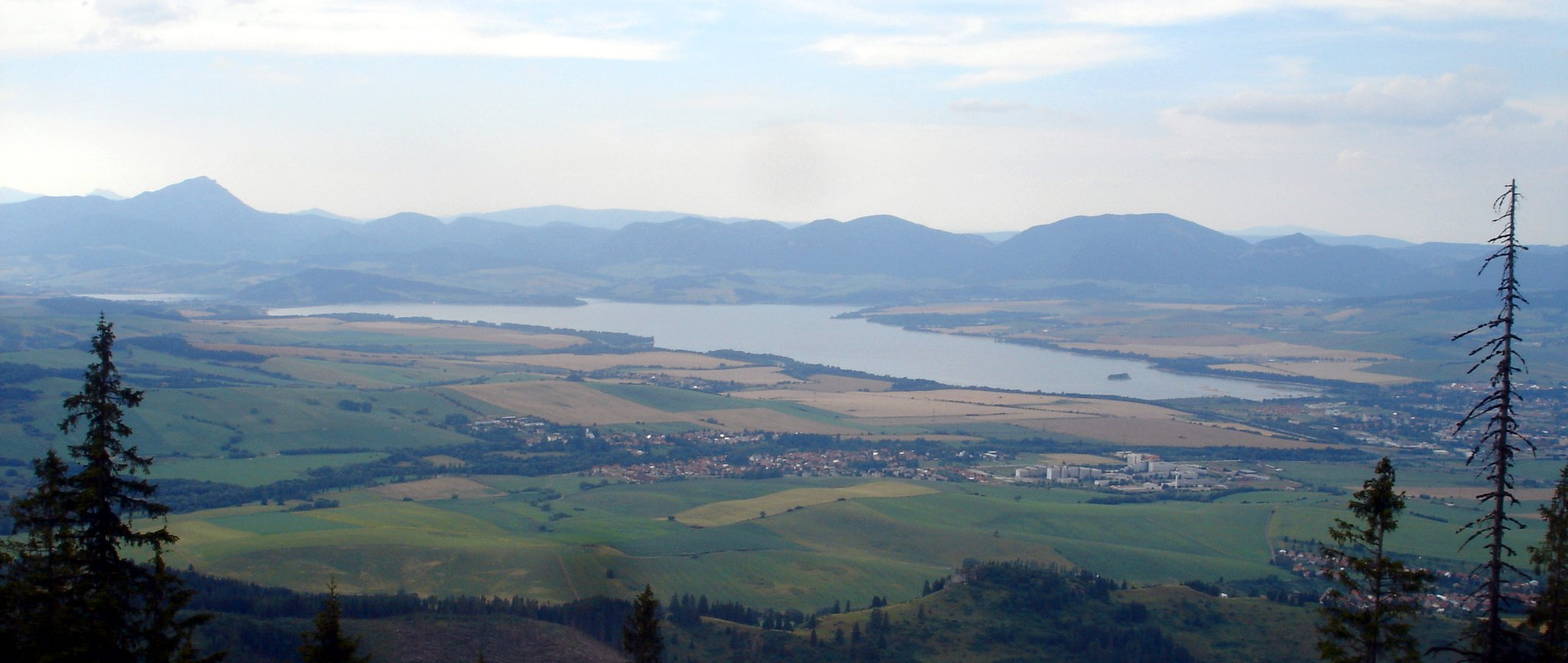
Liptovská Mara in Slovakia (built in 1975), an example of an artificial lake which significantly changed the local climate

=== Climate ===
Reservoirs may change the local climate increasing humidity and reducing extremes of temperature, especially in dry areas. Such effects are claimed also by some South Australian wineries as increasing the quality of the wine production.

== List of reservoirs ==
In 2005, there were 33,105 large dams (≥15 m height) listed by the International Commission on Large Dams (ICOLD).

=== List of reservoirs by area ===
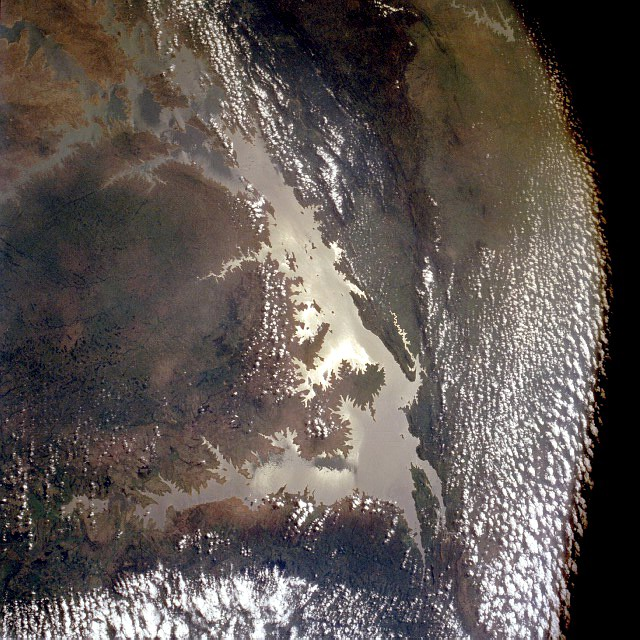
Lake Volta from space (April 1993)

The world's ten largest reservoirs by surface area
Rank	Name	Country	Surface area		Notes
Rank	Name	Country	km^{2}	sq mi	Notes
1	Lake Volta	Ghana	8,482	3,275	
2	Smallwood Reservoir	Canada	6,527	2,520	
3	Kuybyshev Reservoir	Russia	6,450	2,490	
4	Lake Kariba	Zimbabwe, Zambia	5,580	2,150	
5	Bukhtarma Reservoir	Kazakhstan	5,490	2,120	
6	Bratsk Reservoir	Russia	5,426	2,095	
7	Lake Nasser	Egypt, Sudan	5,248	2,026	
8	Rybinsk Reservoir	Russia	4,580	1,770	
9	Caniapiscau Reservoir	Canada	4,318	1,667	
10	Lake Guri	Venezuela	4,250	1,640	

=== List of reservoirs by volume ===
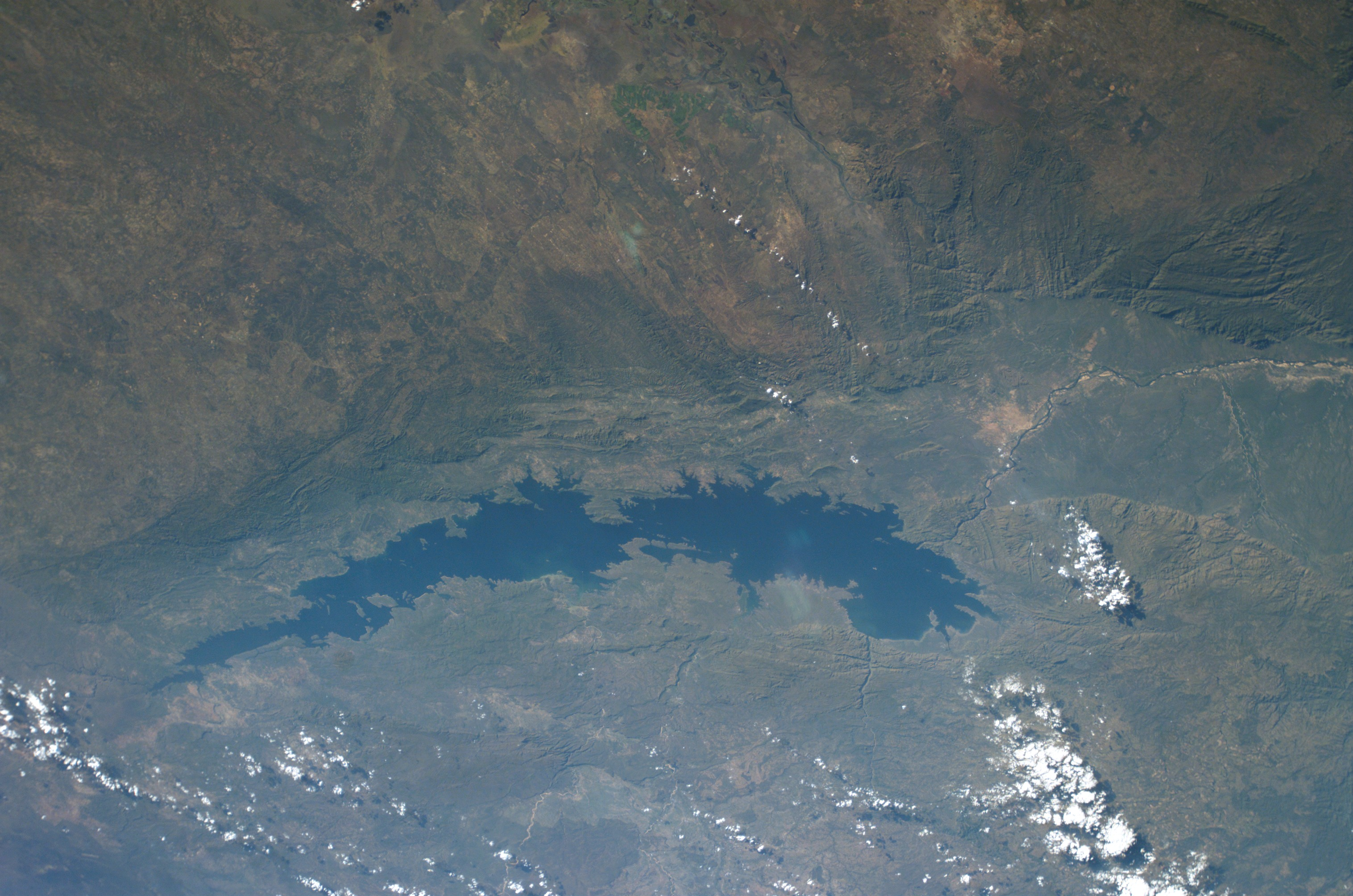
Lake Kariba from space

The world's nine largest reservoirs by volume
Rank	Name	Country	Volume		Notes
Rank	Name	Country	km^{3}	cu mi	Notes
1	Lake Kariba	Zimbabwe, Zambia	180	43	
2	Bratsk Reservoir	Russia	169	41	
3	Lake Nasser	Egypt, Sudan	157	38	
4	Lake Volta	Ghana	148	36	
5	Manicouagan Reservoir	Canada	142	34	
6	Guri Reservoir	Venezuela	135	32	
7	Williston Lake	Canada	74	18	
8	Krasnoyarsk Reservoir	Russia	73	18	
9	Zeya Reservoir	Russia	68	16	

== See also ==
- Ab Anbar
- Coastal sediment supply
- Colourful lakelets (in Poland)
- Dam failure
- Drainage basin
- Forebay
- Head of the reservoir
- Mill pond
- Pond
- Quarry lake
- Reservoir safety
- Shade balls
- Water pan
