= Cantref Reservoir =

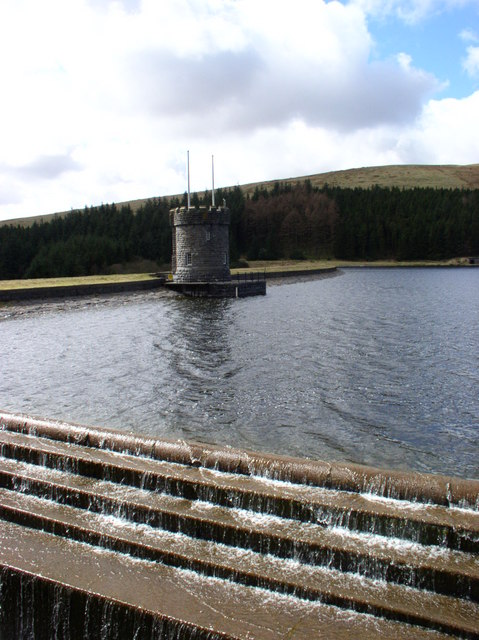

- Location within Wales
- Location: Wales
- Coordinates: 51°49′55″N 3°27′40″W
- Type: reservoir
- Basin countries: United Kingdom
- Max. length: 0.75 miles (1.21 km)
- Surface area: 42.85 acres (17.34 ha)
- Surface elevation: 1,073 feet (327 m)

Cantref Reservoir is the middle of the three reservoirs in the Taff Fawr valley in Wales. It was built by Cardiff Corporation Waterworks between 1886 and 1892, but since 1973 has been owned by Welsh Water. It is located in the Brecon Beacons National Park, mostly in the Powys unitary authority area and within the historic county boundaries of Brecknockshire. Part of the south west corner is in the Rhondda Cynon Taf unitary authority area.

A public footpath crosses the dam and links with the Taff Trail and the Navvies Line paths.

== History ==
Cardiff Corporation had bought out the Cardiff Waterworks Company in 1879, and in March 1881 asked their Borough Engineer, John Avery Brandon Williams, to produce a report on all possible sources of water for Cardiff, so that they could plan for the future. Williams presented his reports in May and August 1881, suggesting that the best scheme was to impound the waters of the upper Taff Fawr. The Corporation were a little hesitant, but consulted the water engineer John Frederick Bateman, who also recommended the Taff Fawr scheme in June 1882 as the one most likely to meet the needs for water at the lowest cost. They presented a bill to Parliament in November 1883, which was considered by a House of Commons Committee between 1 May and 20 May 1884. There were 16 petitions against it and serious opposition from riparian landowners, but several influential civil engineers was called to give evidence, notably Bateman, Thomas Hawksley James Mansergh, and George H. Hill. J A B Williams, their own Engineer, and the meteorologist George James Symonds also gave evidence, and although it cost the Corporation £3,652 to fight the case, Royal Assent was obtained for the Cardiff Corporation Act 1884 on 7 August.

The catchment of the upper Taff Fawr was 10,400 acres (42 km^{2}) but it was split into an upper area of 4,000 acres (16 km^{2}) and a lower one of 6,400 acres (26 km^{2}). Any works had to provide compensation water to maintain the flow in the Taff Fawr, and working on the upper area first meant that they only had to supply 3 million imperial gallons (14 Ml) per day of compensation flow until work started on the lower area. Cantref Reservoir, at the time known as Cantreff, was the first to be built, together with a 32-mile (51 km) pipeline to Lisvane Reservoir and Llanishen Reservoir and intermediate balancing reservoirs at Blackbrook, Cefn, and Rhubina. Work on the pipeline was completed in September 1888, and on the balancing reservoirs in November 1888. Construction or the reservoir was not so straight forward.

Initially the contract for construction of the earth dam, which was about 600 feet (180 m) long with a puddle clay core, was awarded to William Jones of Neath. To provide access to the site, a standard gauge railway, some 6 miles (9.7 km) long, was built from Cefn Coed to the reservoir sites, and by the time the first sod was cut for the reservoir by the Mayor on 4 May 1886, around 2 miles (3.2 km) of the railway had already been completed. Jones succeeded in cutting the embankment trench and filling the bottom with a concrete key, but he lacked funds, and did not have enough pumping plant to keep the workings dry. Many of his labourers left the job, and progress became very slow. The Town Clerk took possession of the works on 29 October 1888, which included Jones' plant, tools and implements. Jones then took out a writ against the Corporation, and an agreement was not reached until June 1889, with the Corporation paying £10,000 to the court in July.

Meanwhile, a new contract was awarded in March 1889 to John Mackay of Newport, who had previously completed work on Llanishen Reservoir and the balancing reservoirs at Blackbrook, Cefn and Rhubina for the Corporation. The contract was for £89,619, and he had two years to complete the work, but again progress was slow, with the extremely wet weather of 1890 being a significant factor. He struggled to retain his workforce, and wrote to J A B Williams explaining the difficulties. By February 1891 he had completed about half of the job, and on 18 March 1891 the Water Committee relieved him of his contract, paid for the work that had been done, and took possession of his plant, railways, a quarry and a clay field from which the puddle clay was extracted. Mackay's involvement with the project ceased on 13 June 1891.

Completion of the reservoir was achieved by using direct labour. J T Jones was the first site manager, but became ill, and this role was taken over by F Orton in November 1881. The reservoir was formally opened on 14 September 1892 by Alderman David Jones, who was chairman of the Waterworks Committee, and impounding of water began on the same day. A plaque to commemorate the event named the Waterworks Engineer, J A B Williams, but failed to mention either of the contractors. The weir and the steps of the overflow channel on the western side of the dam were faced in granite obtained from Cornwall, but the rest of the stone was obtained from a quarry near Cefn Coed, served by sidings on the railway, at which extraction began while Jones was fulfilling his contract.

As built, the crest of the dam was 120 feet (37 m) above the foundations, and 90 feet (27 m) above the level of the river. At its maximum, the water is 73 feet (22 m) deep, and the dam created a reservoir which is 0.75 miles (1.21 km) long, holding 323 million imperial gallons (1,470 Ml). It covers an area of 42.85 acres (17.34 ha) and its surface level is 1,073 feet (327 m) Above Ordnance Datum. Unlike the other two reservoirs in the chain, the size as built was that specified by the original Act of 1884, whereas the capacity of Beacons and Llwyn-on was doubled when construction began.

=== Railways ===
The remote location of Cantref Reservoir and the huge amount of material needed to construct the dam resulted in plans for a standard gauge railway to be built. This left the London and North Western Railway/Brecon and Merthyr Tydfil Junction Railway joint line near Cefn-coed-y-cymmer station, and passed through a rocky gorge, where a trestle bridge was built to carry it over the Taff Fawr. The bridge was 150 feet (46 m) long, and some 50 feet (15 m) above the river. After that, it ran on a ledge to the west of the river, and by the time it reached the site of Llwyn-on Reservoir, on which work did not start until 1911, it ran along the valley floor. At first, it may have crossed over the river near Nant-Ddu lodge, and run along its eastern bank to the foot of the dam, but it later stayed on the western bank to reach the top of the dam. The track was built by William Jones, the first contractor for the reservoir, on the basis that it would be taken over by the Corporation. Work began on it around April 1886, and it was largely finished by October, although storm damage meant that some of the ballasting was delayed. After Jones' reservoir contract had been revoked, the railway was valued at £3,395 in December 1888 as part of the settlement litigation. A temporary incline was constructed in June 1889 to the north of the dam, but it is not clear whether this began at the lower level and was used to raise materials, or began at the higher level and was used to lower them to the worksite.

The railway was built on land owned by Sir William Lewis to the south of Cantref, and was later extended northwards over land belonging to Lord Tredegar to enable the reservoir at Beacons to be built. In 1891 the Corporation negotiated with Lewis to allow the railway to remain in place for another six years, and it was agreed, providing that the route was properly fenced, gates were provided at level crossings where necessary, and goods for local farms could be transported from Cefn for free. When the railway was no longer needed, the land would be reinstated, or the landowner could buy it. However, around 1.04 miles (1.67 km) of track were lifted in March 1892, after a disagreement developed. This was probably a new section which was part of the northern extension, but the difficulties were eventually resolved, and the track was reinstated in April 1893. The Board of Trade approved the plans for the extension on 27 April 1893 and by June, two timber viaducts had been built, to carry the railway over ravines on the west bank of the reservoir, and the Beacons site was reached, creating a railway that was 7.25 miles (11.67 km) in length.

Puddle clay for the construction of the core of the dam was obtained from land owned by the Crawshay Brothers, part of their ironworks near Merthyr Tydfil. It was located near the Six Bells public house at Pen-yr-Heolgerrig, and a 3 ft (914 mm)-gauge railway was used to transfer the clay from the field to the main line railway. It was then moved to the Corporation sidings at Cefn Coed, from where the private locomotives hauled it up the valley to Cantref. One narrow gauge locomotive is known to have worked at the clay pit, an 0-4-0 saddle tank named Darrell, which was obtained second-hand from the Bargoed Coal Company of Fochriw around 1885. It was probably obtained by Mackay, but passed into Corporation ownership when his contract was terminated, and was sold to the Crawshay Brothers in early 1897 for £150, becoming their Cyfarthfa 14.

Tracing the history of the standard gauge locomotives used on the construction project is a little more difficult. Jones, the first contractor, is known to have had one locomotive, and possibly a second. When Mackay took over the contract, he bought four more with him, and so there were five or six operating during this period. The Corporation bought a second-hand locomotive in 1891, and two new ones in 1891 and 1894. Four 0-6-0 and two 0-4-0 saddle tanks have been positively identified, and there was a locomotive named Swansea, the identity of which is less certain. There were three sales of plant and equipment in 1897 and 1898, at which eight locomotives were listed, so it is possible that some were offered for sale more than once. One locomotive, named Cantreff was definitely auctioned at the final sale on 2 September 1898 and subsequently worked in the Northamptonshire ironstone industry until 1962.

== Bibliography ==
- Bowtell, Harold D; Hill, Geoffrey (2006). Reservoir Builders of South Wales. Industrial Railway Society. ISBN 978-0-9540726-2-9.
- Wheatley, Joseph Larke (1905). History of the Cardiff Corporation Waterworks Undertaking. British History Online.
