= Beacons Reservoir =

Reservoir in the Brecon Beacons, Wales

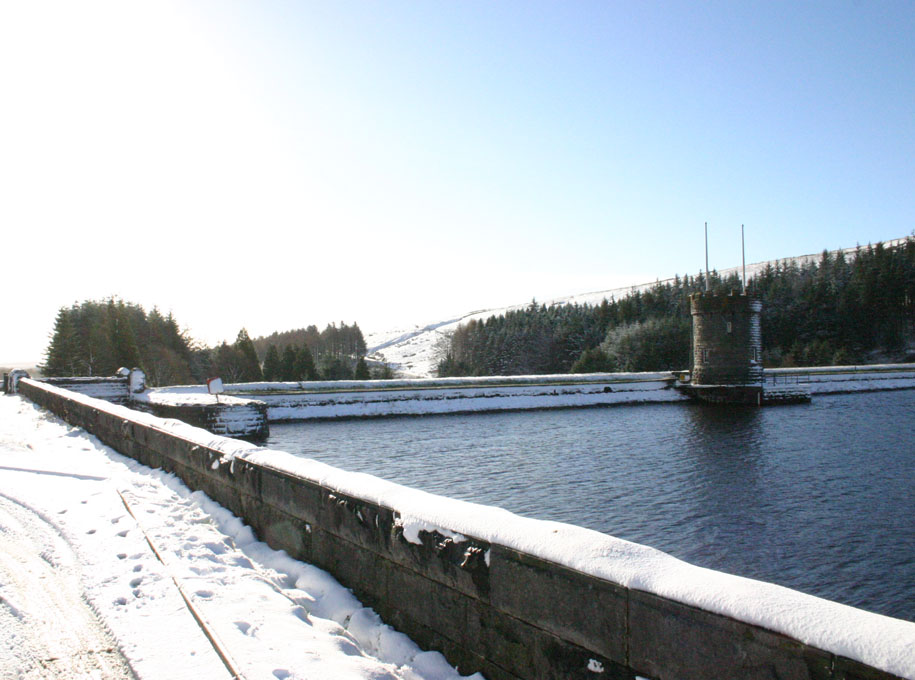

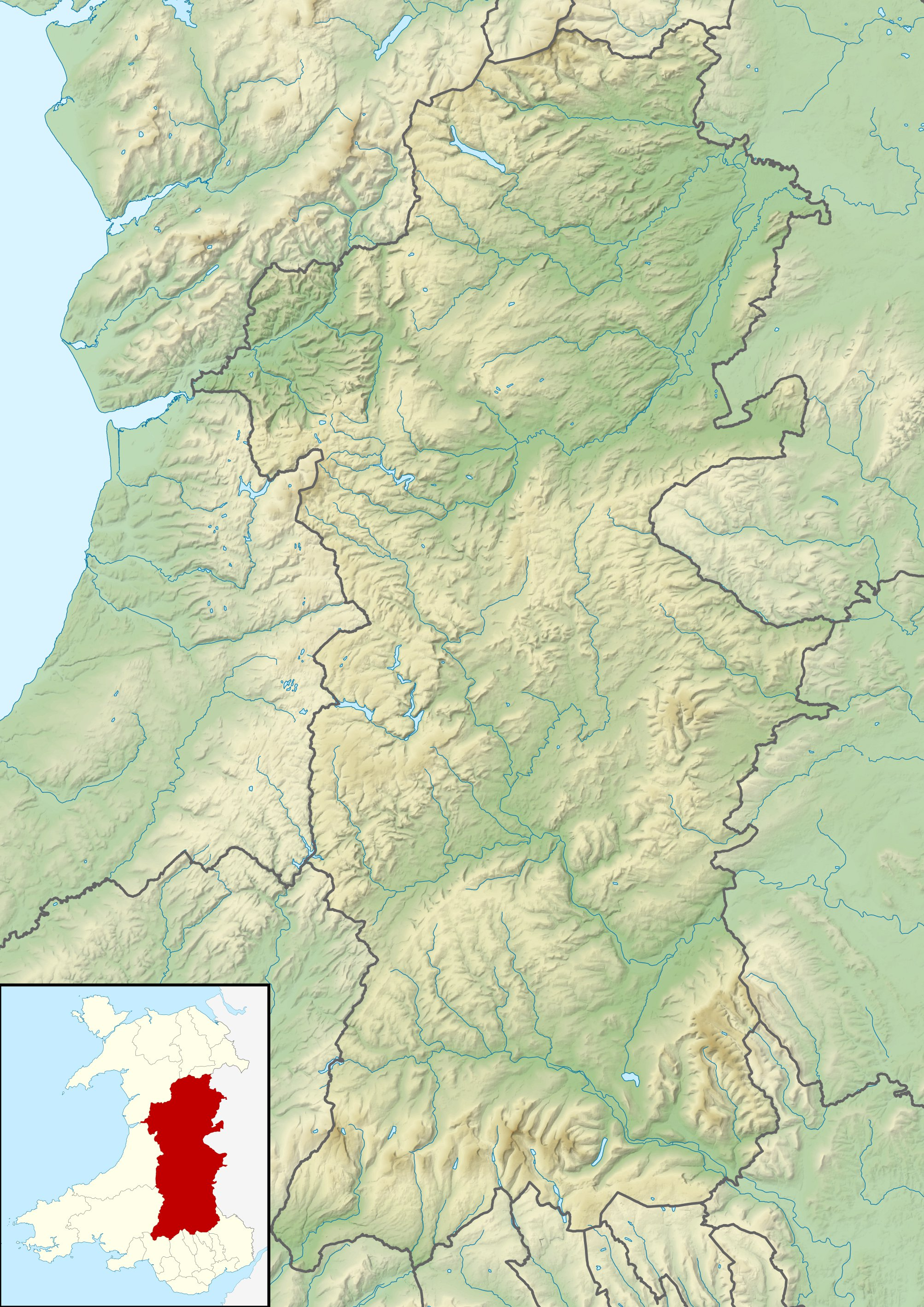
- Location within Powys
- Location: Taff Fawr valley, South Wales
- Coordinates: 51°51′23″N 3°28′19″W
- Type: reservoir
- Basin countries: United Kingdom

Beacons Reservoir (Welsh: Cronfa'r Bannau) is the northernmost of the three reservoirs in the Taff Fawr valley in South Wales. It was built by Cardiff Corporation Waterworks between 1893 and 1897, and the water is impounded by an earth dam with a clay core. Since 1973 it has been owned by Welsh Water. As its name suggests, it is located in the Brecon Beacons National Park in the Powys unitary authority area and within the historic county boundaries of Breconshire.

There is access to the Taff Trail from the car park below the dam.

== History ==
Cardiff Corporation had bought out the Cardiff Waterworks Company in 1879, and in March 1881 asked their Borough Engineer, John Avery Brandon Williams, to produce a report on all possible sources of water for Cardiff, so that they could plan for the future. Williams presented his reports in May and August 1881, suggesting that the best scheme was to impound the waters of the upper Taff Fawr. After consulting the water engineer John Frederick Bateman, who also recommended the Taff Fawr scheme in June 1882 as the one most likely to meet the needs for water at the lowest cost, the corporation presented a bill to Parliament in November 1883, which was considered by a House of Commons committee between 1 May and 20 May 1884. It faced serious opposition from riparian landowners and there were 16 petitions against it, but several influential civil engineers was called to give evidence, notably Bateman, Thomas Hawksley James Mansergh, and George H. Hill. J. A. B. Williams, their own Engineer, and the meteorologist George James Symonds also gave evidence, and although it cost the corporation £3,652 to fight the case, royal assent was obtained for the Cardiff Corporation Act 1884 on 7 August.

The catchment of the upper Taff Fawr was 10,400 acres (42 km^{2}) but it was split into an upper area of 4,000 acres (16 km^{2}) and a lower one of 6,400 acres (26 km^{2}). Any works had to provide compensation water to maintain the flow in the Taff Fawr, and working on the upper area first meant that they only had to supply 3 million imperial gallons (14 Ml) per day of compensation flow until work started on the lower area. Cantref Reservoir, at the time known as Cantreff, was the first to be built, together with a 32-mile (51 km) pipeline to Lisvane Reservoir and Llanishen Reservoir and intermediate balancing reservoirs at Blackbrook, Cefn, and Rhubina. Work on the pipeline was completed in September 1888, and on the balancing reservoirs in November 1888. Cantref Reservoir was completed on 14 September 1892, and attention then turned to the highest reservoir in the chain.

The Cardiff Corporation Act 1884 had specified that the Beacons Reservoir would have a capacity of 160 million imperial gallons (730 Ml) but during the detailed planning for the project, Williams found that placing the dam a little higher up the valley would more than double the capacity of the reservoir, and would also provide a solid rock foundation on which to build it. Accordingly, the corporation went back to Parliament, and the Cardiff Corporation Act 1894 authorised the expanded reservoir, which would have a capacity of 345 million imperial gallons (1,570 Ml). For Cantref Reservoir, a standard gauge railway had been constructed from the main line at Cefn-coed-y-cymmer to the dam site, some 6 miles (9.7 km) to the north. They had started to extend it towards the Beacons site in 1891, and had agreed terms with the landowner, Sir William Lewis, for the existing railway to remain in place for another six years, but in March 1892 a disagreement occurred, and 1.14 miles (1.83 km) of track were lifted where the railway crossed his land. Most of the extension to Beacons passed through land owned by Lord Tredegar, with whom separate negotiations were taking place. The differences were resolved, and after the Board of Trade approved the new route on 27 April 1893, the lifted track was re-instated, and the track to Beacons was completed, making a 7.25-mile (11.67 km) railway. Some difficulties had been experienced building the Cantref dam, with two contractors failing to complete the work, which had resulted in the corporation completing the job by using direct labour. For Beacons, they decided to use direct labour for the whole project, and work began in April 1893, in advance of obtaining the act of Parliament.

The site was remote, and situated around 1,300 to 1,400 feet (400 to 430 m) Above Ordnance Datum. By the autumn of 1893, a whole village had been created near the dam site, with sidings and running roads on the railway, workshops for carpenters, a blacksmith's workshop, a boiler house, a fitting shop, a shed for the locomotives, a saw mill, stables for the horses, a wagon shop and accommodation for 335 men. Where possible, buildings had been removed from Cantref and reused, although living quarters for another 85 men remained at Cantref. One unusual item purchased at the time was 500 yards (460 m) of 15 in (381 mm)-gauge "Decauville railway", complete with turntables, points and wagons, but its use was never recorded. As with Cantref, stone was obtained from a quarry near Cefn-coed-y-cymmer, close to the private railway, and puddle clay for the central core of the dam was extracted from a field which was part of the Crawshay Brothers ironworks at Cyfarthfa, where a 3 ft (914 mm)-gauge railway was used to transport the clay to the mainline railway.

The busiest period was in 1895–96, when some 500 men were employed. While many were involved in building the dam, others worked on the railway, in the quarry, and at the clay field at Cyfarthfa. February 1896 was the busiest month, when 4,100 tons of clay were excavated and transferred to the dam site. There were periods where wet weather meant that men did not work on the main construction, and in some cases were laid off until the weather improved. From September 1895, the workmen's train was withdrawn, and despite petitions from the men, the committee refused to reverse their decision. By Christmas 1896, the main core of the dam was completed, and finishing works were carried on through the spring and summer. The railway yard at Beacons, and the track to below the Cantref dam were removed between March and June 1897, impounding of water began on 17 September, while many of the buildings were dismantled prior to the opening ceremony held on 30 September, when Alderman David Jones presided.

The dam consists of an earth embankment with a clay core, which is faced with masonry. A circular valve tower with castellated stonework is located on a masonry platform which projects from the inner face of the dam. The valve tower is offset towards the east side of the dam, and there is a spillway at its eastern edge, crossed by a stone bridge. The length of the dam is 1,020 feet (310 m) and it is 61 feet (18.6 m) tall at its highest point.

== Archaeological sites ==
During periods of low water, the remains of longhouses can be seen. One building overlooking the Taff Fawr has foundations of massive weathered slabs. Flint tools have been found.

== Bibliography ==
- Bowtell, Harold D; Hill, Geoffrey (2006). Reservoir Builders of South Wales. Industrial Railway Society. ISBN 978-0-9540726-2-9.
- Timelines (2020). "Cardiff Water Supply". Engineering Timelines. Archived from the original on 19 August 2020.
- Wheatley, Joseph Larke (1905). History of the Cardiff Corporation Waterworks Undertaking. British History Online.
