= Brecon Old Bank =

The Brecon Old Bank was founded in Brecon in 1778 by John Wilkins (1713–1784), who was highly regarded by the directors of the Bank of England.

== Development ==
The bank was originally operated under the style Wilkins & Co. and developed steadily, opening up branches in Merthyr Tydfil, in 1812, and Cardigan, Carmarthen and Haverfordwest, in 1832. The branch at Brecon is now the site of Lloyds Bank. The branch at Cardigan was located on the High Street next to Lloyds Bank.

After 1830, the enterprise operated under the name Brecon Old Bank. The bank did well in West Wales, but did encounter a run against its assets in 1866, the year of the Overend, Gurney and Company failure in London. Around a hundred depositors claimed that they wanted their money back to erect water mills, while others said they wanted to build new houses and other buildings. However, bank officials had sufficient resources to meet all calls for this fictional building boom, and all cheques were paid promptly. Depositors were then invited to re-deposit money with the bank once their fears were over. The run on the bank lasted seven days. Afterwards, nearly every depositor reopened an account at the bank.

== Sale to Lloyds Bank ==
In 1890, Brecon Old Bank was sold to Lloyds Bank Ltd., after a successful period of trading. Around 1876, the partners in the bank were John Evans, William de Winton, Henry Jones Evans, T. J. Evans, E. B. Evans and W. S. de Winton.

W. S. De Winton became an active director in Lloyds Bank Ltd.
