= Paddy Buckley Round =

Fell running challenge in north Wales

Coordinates: 53.1°N 4.1°W

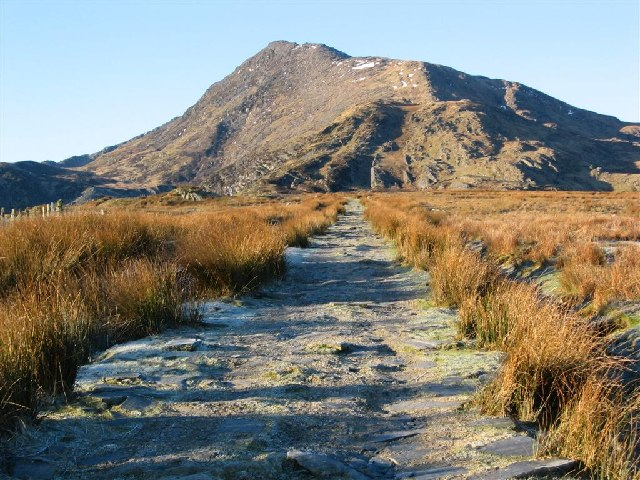
Capel Curig to Moel Siabod

The Paddy Buckley Round, also known as the Welsh Classical Round, is a long distance fell running challenge in Snowdonia, Wales. The route is a circuit of just over 100 km long, taking in some 47 summits. The Round has the reputation of being somewhat tougher to complete than its English Lake District equivalent, the Bob Graham Round.

Although no official time limit is set, an arbitrary 24 hours is applied, although the first completer exceeded the original aim of 24 hours.

Runners may start at any point on the circular route (finishing at the same place) and may run the course in either a clockwise or anticlockwise direction. The route takes in the well-known high mountain ranges of Snowdon, the Glyderau and the Carneddau, as well as the slightly less visited ranges of Moel Siabod, the Moelwynion, Moel Hebog and the Nantlle Ridge. The route was devised by the eponymous Paddy Buckley and first completed in 1982 by Wendy Dodds. The selection of summits that must be visited is somewhat arbitrary and no rules appear to have been applied in selecting them. Generally, it takes in the major peaks of the ranges that are being crossed, then any minor tops that are passed along the way are also included. Some of these tops really are just bumps on the ridge and not really summits in their own right at all.

The fastest known completion of the round was, for many years, by Mark Hartell in 18 hours 10 minutes. On 4 May 2008, this time was matched by Chris Near of Eryri Harriers. This old record was broken in July 2009 by Tim Higginbottom, who completed the Round in a time of 17 hours and 42 minutes. This was further reduced in 2019 by Damian Hall with 17 hours 31 minutes, and again on 30 August 2020 by Matthew Roberts, with a time of 16 hours 38 minutes. Kim Collison set a new best time of 16 hours 20 minutes in April 2021. A year later, in April 2022, a new record was set by Finlay Wild, who completed the round solo and unsupported in a time of 15 hours 14 minutes.

The women's record is held by Lizzie Richardson, with a time of 17 hours and 22 minutes, set in 2023.

A double Paddy Buckley Round was first completed by Nicky Spinks in May 2019 in a time of 57 hours 57 minutes, completing her trilogy of double rounds of the UK's big 3 rounds. The double record now stands at 52 hours 52 minutes set by Ajay Hanspal in June 2024, being the second person to successfully complete the double. Both double rounds were supported but differed in both direction and start point: Nicky Spinks opted to start in Capel Curig going anti-clockwise, then clockwise; whereas Ajay Hanspal opted to start in Llanberis, going clockwise, then anti-clockwise. The double Paddy Buckley Round is considered to be 2-4 hours slower than the double Bob Graham Round.

The book "The Welsh Three Thousand Foot Challenges: A Guide for Walkers and Hill Runners" describes a version of the route which avoids the slate quarries, which the fastest line utilises, and also suggests attempting it as a four-day backpacking (lightweight camping) excursion rather than a one-day run.

== Route ==
Below is a list of the summits to be visited, in a clockwise direction, if starting from Llanberis.

Summit		Grid reference	Altitude/m	Approximate cumulative distance/km
	Llanberis	SH582598	105	0
1	Elidir Fach	SH603613	795	3
2	Elidir Fawr	SH612613	924	4
3	Mynydd Perfedd	SH623619	812	6
4	Foel Goch	SH628611	831	7
5	Y Garn	SH630595	947	8
6	Glyder Fawr	SH642579	999	11
7	Glyder Fach	SH656582	994	12
8	Tryfan	SH664593	917	14
	Ogwen Cottage	SH649603	300	16
9	Pen yr Ole Wen	SH655619	978	18
10	Carnedd Dafydd	SH663630	1044	18
11	Carnedd Llewelyn	SH683643	1064	23
12	Pen yr Helgi Du	SH698630	833	25
13	Pen Llithrig y Wrach	SH716623	799	27
	Capel Curig	SH721582	200	32
14	Carnedd Moel Siabod	SH705546	872	36
15	Clogwyn Bwlch-y-maen	SH679542	548	39
16	Carnedd y Cribau	SH676536	591	40
17	Cerrig Cochion	SH662510	550	43
18	Moel Meirch	SH661502	607	44
19	Ysgafell Wen	SH664487	650	46
20	Mynydd Llynnau'r Cwn	SH663485	669	46
21	Three Tops	SH667481	672	47
22	Moel Druman	SH671476	676	47
23	Allt-fawr	SH681474	698	48
	Bwlch Cwmorthin	SH665462	470	51
24	Foel Ddu	SH669459	458	52
25	Moel-yr-hydd	SH672454	648	52
26	Moelwyn Bach	SH660437	710	55
27	Craigysgafn	SH659444	689	55
28	Moelwyn Mawr	SH658448	770	56
29	Cnicht	SH645466	689	60
	Aberglaslyn	SH594462	5	67
30	Bryn Banog	SH576457	529	70
31	Moel Hebog	SH564469	782	72
32	Moel yr Ogof	SH556478	655	73
33	Moel Lefn	SH553485	638	74
34	Y Gyrn	SH552500	452	76
35	Mynydd-y-Ddwy-elor	SH549504	466	76
36	Trum y Ddysgl	SH544516	709	78
37	Mynydd Drws-y-coed	SH548518	695	78
38	Y Garn	SH551526	633	79
	Rhyd-Ddu	SH570525	190	82
39	Craig Wen	SH597508	608	86
40	Yr Aran	SH604515	747	87
41	Cribau Tregalan	SH605536	931	90
42	Snowdon	SH609543	1085	91
43	Garnedd Ugain	SH610551	1065	92
44	Moel Cynghorion	SH586563	674	95
45	Foel Goch	SH570563	605	97
46	Foel Gron	SH563565	629	98
47	Moel Eilio	SH556577	726	99
	Llanberis	SH582598	105	104

== Route profile ==
Below is a profile of the route, again starting and finishing at Llanberis, running in a clockwise direction.

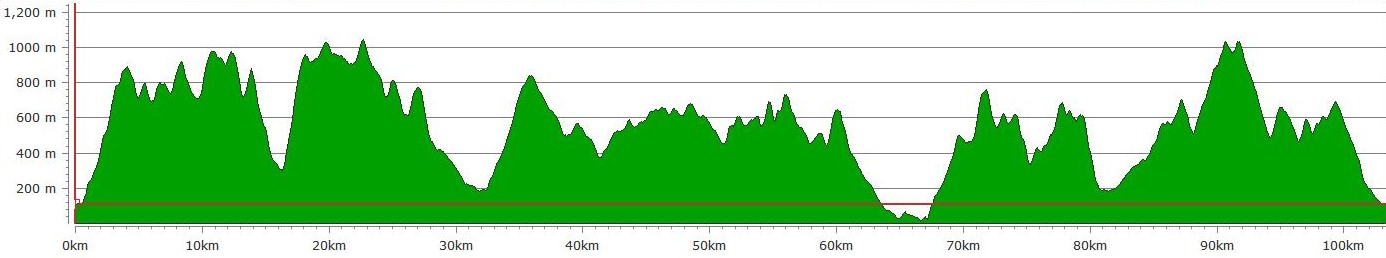
Paddy Buckley Round profile
