= Moelwyn Mawr North Ridge Top =

Coordinates: 52.98369°N 4.00044°W

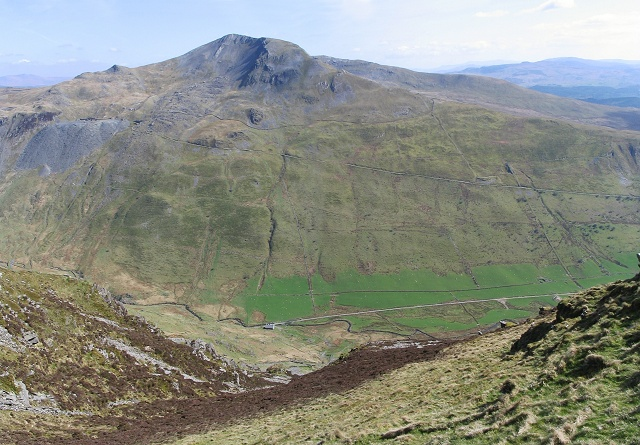
- Moelwyn Mawr North Ridge Top (left) and Moelwyn Mawr (right) from Cnicht

Highest point
- Elevation: 650 m (2,130 ft)
- Prominence: 15 m (49 ft)
- Parent peak: Moelwyn Mawr
- Listing: Nuttall

Naming
- English translation: great white hill
- Language of name: Welsh
- Pronunciation: Welsh: [ˈmɔɨlwɨn ˈmaur]

Geography
- Location: Gwynedd, Wales
- Parent range: Snowdonia
- OS grid: SH658448
- Topo map: OS Landranger 124

Moelwyn Mawr North Ridge Top is a top of Moelwyn Mawr in Snowdonia, North Wales and forms part of the Moelwynion. From its summit, which directly overlooks Bwlch Rhosydd, can be seen Cnicht, Allt-fawr and Moel-yr-hydd. A recently discovered 'top' has only received attention from Nuttall baggers.
