= Cnicht North Top =

Welsh hilltop

Coordinates: 53°0′1.26″N 4°1′7.66″W

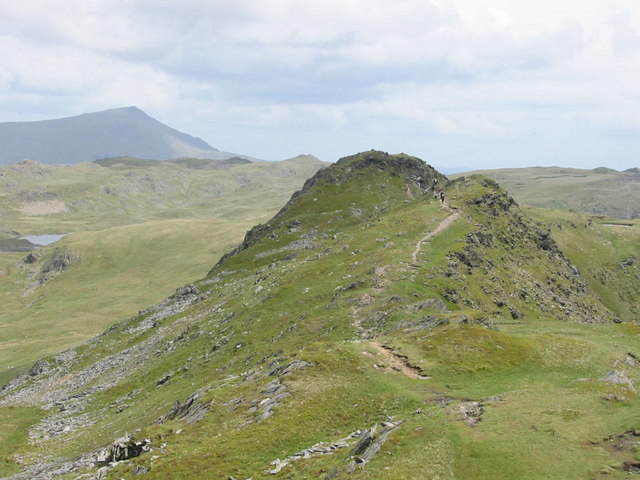
- Cnicht North Top from Cnicht summit ridge

Highest point
- Elevation: 688 m (2,257 ft)
- Prominence: 18 m (59 ft)
- Listing: Nuttall

Naming
- English translation: knight
- Language of name: Old English
- Pronunciation: Welsh pronunciation: [ˈknɪχt]

Geography
- Location: Gwynedd, Wales
- Parent range: Moelwynion
- OS grid: SH645466
- Topo map: OS Landranger 115

Cnicht North Top is a top of Cnicht in Snowdonia, which forms part of the Moelwynion mountain range.

It is one of the Nuttalls, a list of 443 hills in England and Wales over 2,000 ft (610 m) with a relative height of at least 49 ft (15 m). The list was compiled by John and Anne Nuttall and published in 1993 as two volumes, "The Mountains of England & Wales".

North Top is a bump on the north ridge; it is often bypassed by walkers heading for Ysgafell Wen, Moel Druman and Allt-fawr.

Height in Metres: 688 metres
