= Deep Sleep (hotel) =

Underground hotel in Wales

- Interactive map of the Deep Sleep area

General information
- Type: Overnight stay accommodation
- Location: Tanygrisiau, Gwynedd, Wales
- Coordinates: 52.99°N 3.96°W
- Opened: April 2023
- Owner: Go Below Underground Adventures

Other information
- Number of rooms: 4

Website
- www.go-below.co.uk/deep-sleep.asp
- The coordinates are not precise.

Deep Sleep is an underground hotel (Note: The operator does not describe it as a hotel, but a remote-campsite overnight stay.) located in Wales. It is built 1,375 feet (419 m) below ground level, inside an abandoned mine in Cwmorthin quarry in Snowdonia (Eryri) national park. It was opened in April 2023 and the operator claims it to be the deepest accommodation in the world. The mine where the hotel is located was abandoned and left to rot in the mid-twentieth century.

== Overview ==
To reach the accommodation, guests have to trek with a trip guide through a Victorian slate mine. Helmet, light, harness and boots are provided to the guests before the journey. The hotel has to be reached through a challenging path through the mine, which operated from 1810 to 1939. The hotel includes four private twin-bed cabins and a romantic grotto with a double bed.
