= Wrysgan quarry =

Disused slate quarry in North Wales

Wrysgan
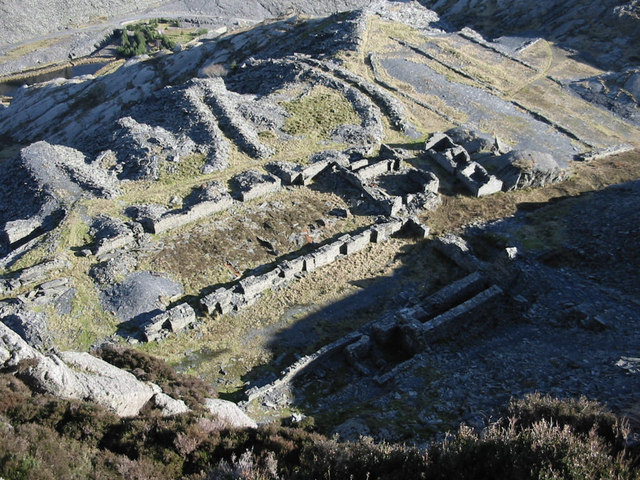
- The ruined Wrysgan mill with the slate stacking yard beyond

- Location in Gwynedd
- Location: Wales, Gwynedd, UK, near Blaenau Ffestiniog, Gwynedd; 52°59′27.96″N 3°58′16.32″W grid reference SH6770445603
- Products: Slate
- Type: Quarry
- Opened: 1830s
- Closed: 1946

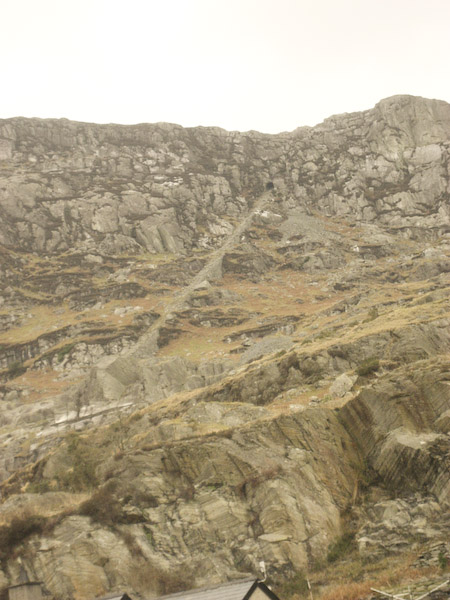
The 625 ft high exit incline from Wrysgan

Wrysgan quarry was a slate quarry near the village of Tanygrisiau, Blaenau Festiniog, North Wales. It was worked intermittently from the 1830s, and was worked continuously from c.1850 until 1946. Wrysgan was an underground slate quarry, which was located on a small inaccessible site, some 1,390 feet (420 m) above sea level, to the west of Cwmorthin.

== History ==
Extraction of slate began in the 1830s, and finished slates were carried down a steep, zigzag path to Cwm Orthin. Like many small quarries in the area, details are often obscure and complex, and there is little evidence of continuous working. Initially, land was leased from the Cwm Orthin and Ormesby-Gore estates, and royalties had to be paid to Cwm Orthin for slates extracted from that part of the quarry. William Roberts of Coed-y-Bleddiau opened it and then sold it to Constable, but the new owner lost money, and the venture failed sometime later. Methusalem Jones from Llandegai, Caernarvon tried to reopen it, but again lost a lot of money, although he did not become bankrupt. After some years of closure, a new group bought it in 1844, but were bankrupted by the high cost of the incline which they started to build.

Around 1850, a new company, the Wrysgan Slate and Slab Quarries Co. Ltd. was incorporated, and completed an incline soon afterwards. Which incline this was is unclear: James I. C. Boyd has suggested that this was the incline that connects to the Ffestiniog Railway, and was built at a cost of £5,000; Alun J. Richards suggests that it was down into Cwm Orthin, and that it was a balanced incline, with a pack horse track running from the bottom. The latter is more likely, given the archaeological evidence. A mill for the processing of the rock was constructed in 1854, and in 1865 a second mill was built at a lower level – the second mill was equipped with 18 saws, 20 dressers and 2 planers. The feature for which the quarry is best known, a spectacular incline which descended 600 feet (180 m) down to the Ffestiniog Railway, and which passed through a tunnel towards the top, was completed in 1872. The shape of the incline was a catenary, the same shape as a rope suspended between the end points would take, as was the main incline at the nearby Rhosydd quarry, but the foot of the incline was too shallow to allow it to be fully self-acting, and a stationary steam engine was installed to raise the empty wagons up to the quarry.

Power to drive the mills was provided by waterwheels, supplied from a small reservoir, Llyn y Wrysgan, situated to the south of the main quarry buildings. The reservoir was filled by a leat, but the water supply was often inadequate. When the site was auctioned in 1869, its assets were stated to include "two powerful water wheels and a steam engine." At some point, a steam engine was installed to power the lower mill, and another was used to raise slates from levels opened up below the level of the mill. Steam engines proved to be costly to run, and the company tried to negotiate use of the unused Cross Mill at Cwmorthin quarry. When the negotiations failed, they replaced the mill engine with a 50 hp (37 kW) producer gas engine, and a water balance was used to raise slate from the lower levels to the mill. A car engine was subsequently used to power this incline. The main incline was also problematical, as the boiler was undersized for the steam engine. The works were electrified in the 1920s, after which a novel solution to the problems of the main incline was introduced. Whenever empty wagons needed to ascend the incline, the main motor from the mill was borrowed and connected to the haulage drum. Later still, a lorry engine was used to power the incline. Because of the intermittent working of the quarry, the incline was lifted in 1913, and was relaid in 1923 by the New Wrysgan Slate Quarry Ltd. A new siding was built at the foot of the incline, and the Board of Trade inspected the works on 7 October 1926. Track was again removed from the incline some time in the 1930s, and it was reinstated as a single track incline in 1940 by its new owner, T. O. Williams. It worked in this form until the quarry closed for good in 1946, on the death of Williams.

=== Output ===
The number of men employed fluctuated wildly over the years. There were 30 men employed at the quarry in 1874, but in 1897, 100 employees were recorded, of which 54 worked underground extracting the rock. In 1904, there were more than 100 men employed, working on eight levels, and some 3,000 tons of finished slates were produced. This volume of production did not last for very long, however. In 1945-1946, eleven men produced just 348 tons per year.

== Description ==
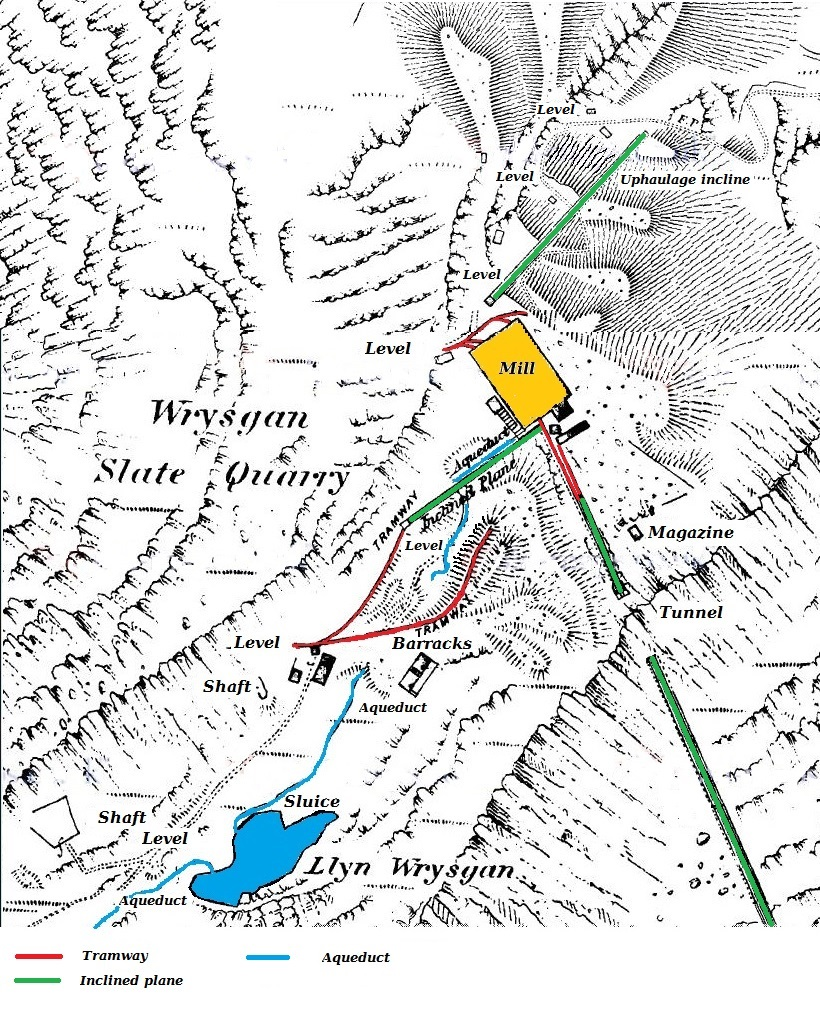
A composite map showing the quarry. The lower section, from the mill downwards, dates from 1889, when the quarry was working, while the top section shows the later uphaulage incline, and dates from 1919, when the quarry was closed.

Wrysgan sits high on the flank of Moel-yr-hydd, to the south of Cwm Orthin. It was separated from Cwm Ystradau by a sharp ridge, through which the quarry bored an inclined tunnel in order to connect to the Festiniog Railway.

On the north side of the tunnel a tramway led to the mill and stacking area, which stood on a small area of flat ground high above Cwm Orthin. To the south of the mill an incline led up to the main floor 3 adit which led west into the chambers underneath Moel-yr-hydd. Further adits lay to the south, accessing other levels.

In order to access the underground workings, five adits were constructed. Two were above the level of the main mill, and were connected to it by a balanced incline. A third adit was constructed at mill level. As the quarry developed, a further two adits were excavated to the north of the mill, and as these were below the mill level, an uphaulage incline was necessary to raise the slates for processing. This was constructed beside the original exit incline to Cwm Orthin. In the final days of operation, a rope haulage system was used to move the rock from the underground chambers to the foot of the incline. Wrysgan, like most of the slate quarries in the Blaenau Ffestiniog region, was excavated as a series of chambers, with pillars of rock left between them to support the mountain above them. While the chambers in many quarries were 50 feet (15 m) wide, with pillars of 30 feet (9 m), some of the chambers at Wrysgan were exceptionally wide, at 130 feet (40 m), with only 50 feet (15 m) of rock left to support the overburden.

=== Remains ===
The most obvious feature of the quarry is the main incline with its tunnel, which is clearly visible from locations near Tanygrisiau railway station. The upper half is well preserved, but the construction of the access road to Llyn Stwlan, the upper lake of the Ffestiniog pumped storage scheme, cut through the structure in the 1950s. There are some remains of the walls of the main mill, and at the higher levels, ruins of the upper mill barracks and some dressing sheds. The internal incline between the mill and upper levels is still intact, as is the uphaulage incline to the north, but there are only traces of the original incline down to Cwm Orthin. The pack horse route and the landing platform are also extant. Llyn y Wrysgan, the small reservoir used to power the water wheels, which is embanked with stone and has a double dam, still holds water. Most of the adits are still open, and the chambers at the top of the quarry break out into daylight. All the chambers are unstable and unsafe.

== Transport ==
Slates were initially transported away from the quarry by pack horse via Cwm Orthin. With the construction of the balanced incline on the northern side of the quarry in 1850, the pack animals were used to transfer the slates from the bottom of the incline to a landing stage. Sledges were probably used for onward transfer down the valley to Tanygrisiau.

The construction of the incline to the south east in 1872, which connected directly to the Ffestiniog Railway, simplified the export of slates. Most travelled to Minffordd, where the Ffestiniog had interchange sidings with the Cambrian Railways and its predecessors, but some slate continued on to Porthmadog Harbour, from which 762 tons were shipped in 1902.

At the time of operation of Wrysgan, the Ffestiniog was a continuous downward gradient from Blaenau Ffestiniog to Boston Lodge, and loaded slate trains were run by gravity, with brakesmen controlling the speed by applying the brakes when necessary. Output from Wrysgan would be added to the down morning gravity train, but there were special considerations, as the gradient near the Wrysgan siding was not sufficient to restart the train once it had stopped. The quarry was supposed to phone Duffwys station, where slate wagons from the quarries served by the Rhiwbach Tramway were marshalled, and a card system was used to indicate that the train would need to stop at Wrysgan. Consequently, the locomotive assigned to be Top Shunter that day would follow the train down, and once the extra wagons were attached, would restart it by giving it a push. Occasionally, the quarry would forget to phone, and the gravity train would be stopped by the signal at Tanygrisiau. This would cause severe disruption to the timetable, because of the difficulties of contacting the Top Shunter.

== Bibliography ==
- Boyd, James I.C. (1975). The Festiniog Railway (Volume 2). Oakwood Press.
- Gwyn, David (2015). Welsh Slate. Royal Commission on the Ancient and Historical Monuments of Wales. ISBN 978-1-871184-51-8.
- Lindsay, Jean (1974). A History of the North Wales Slate Industry. David and Charles. ISBN 978-0-7153-6264-8.
- Richards, Alun John (1991). A Gazeteer of the Welsh Slate Industry. Gwasg Carreg Gwalch. ISBN 978-0-86381-196-8.
- Richards, Alun John (1999). The Slate Regions of North and Mid Wales. Gwasg Carreg Gwalch. ISBN 978-0-86381-552-2.
