= Moelwynion =

Mountain range in Snowdonia, Wales

Coordinates: 53.036°N 3.980°W

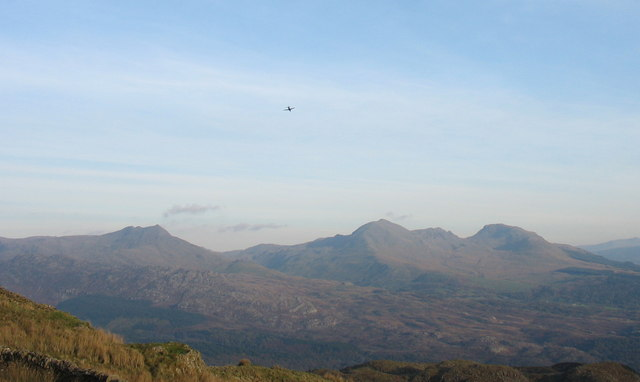
Moelwynion: (left to right) Cnicht, Moelwyn Mawr, Craigysgafn, Moelwyn Bach

The Moelwynion (a Welsh plural, sometimes anglicised to Moelwyns) are a group of mountains in central Snowdonia, north Wales. They extend from the north-east of Porthmadog to Moel Siabod, the highest of the group. The name derives from the names of two of the largest mountains in the group, Moelwyn Mawr (great white hill) and Moelwyn Bach (little white hill), 770m and 710m, respectively. Moel Siabod, to the north, is the highest at 872m.

The group includes the following summits:

- Moel Siabod
- Moelwyn Mawr
- Moelwyn Bach
- Allt-fawr
- Cnicht
- Craigysgafn
- Cnicht North Top
- Moel Druman
- Ysgafell Wen
- Ysgafell Wen North Top
- Manod Mawr
- Manod Mawr North Top
- Ysgafell Wen Far North Top
- Moel-yr-hydd
- Moelwyn Mawr North Ridge Top
- Moel Penamnen
- Moel Meirch
- Y Ro Wen
