= Cwmorthin Tramway =

Tramway in Wales

Overview
- Locale: Wales
- Dates of operation: 1850–1939
- Successor: Abandoned

Technical
- Track gauge: 1 ft 11 1/2 in (597 mm)
- Length: 1.8 miles (2.9 km)

The Cwmorthin Tramway was a 1 ft 11 1/2 in (597 mm) industrial tramway in North Wales, which connected the Ffestiniog Railway to the Cwmorthin Quarry and later the Conglog Slate Quarry. It was built in the 1840s or 1850s, rising through two inclined planes to reach the main Cwmorthin Quarry mill and its internal incline which rose from floor 1 to floor 8. In 1874, it was extended, rising up through a third incline to the Cwmorthin Lake level and continuing along the valley floor to reach the Conglog Quarry. The tracks to Conglog were abandoned in the 1920s and the rest of the tramway ceased to be used from the onset of the Second World War.

== History ==
Quarrying of slate in the Cwmorthin Valley, to the west of Blaenau Ffestiniog, began around 1810 but was not particularly successful, in part due to the difficulties of transporting the finished product away from the quarry. After a lull of some ten years, work began again in 1840, and in 1861 the Cwmorthin Slate Company was incorporated. The company bought the freehold to the land on which quarrying took place. At some point, a tramway was built to connect the mill to the Ffestiniog Railway near to the site of Tanygrisiau station. Boyd suggests that a survey for the line was prepared in the mid-1840s, and that the cost was estimated to be £1,407 and 19 shillings. The line was completed by 1850, when it was mentioned in Cliffe's The Book of North Wales. However, Richards and Isherwood maintain that the tramway was constructed under the auspices of the 1861 Company, soon after it was established.

The connection to the Ffestiniog Railway was never very satisfactory. A point left the main line, and immediately split into three tracks. Two were used for wagon storage, while the third passed through a gate, beyond which the twin tracks of the first incline began. Empty wagons were delivered to the sidings by the shunting engine from Blaenau Ffestiniog, but to get them up to the quarry, they were shunted by hand back onto the main line, and then onto one of the incline tracks. Loaded wagons followed the reverse procedure, so that they were marshalled in the sidings for collection by the Ffestiniog. Because this process involved moving wagons onto the main line, it could only be done when the single line staff for the track section above Tan y Grisiau was withdrawn from the token machine by the Tan y Grisiau stationmaster. He then supervised the operation of a small ground frame which controlled the points. A Board of Trade inspector visiting the site in 1864 objected to the arrangement, because there were no trap points to protect the main line, and ruled that distant signals must be fitted by the Ffestiniog Railway, that there should be a telegraph installed between the station and the drumhouse at the top of the incline, and that no trains should use the main line while the incline was in operation.

The first incline headed towards the north-east, was some 365 feet (111 m) long and raised the level of the track by 160 feet (49 m). It was generally known as the Village incline, and a stone bridge carried the minor road to the hamlet of Dolrhedyn over the lower section. There was a section of stone and earth embankment, and then a shallow rock cutting before the drumhouse was reached. This consisted of a drum which was 9 feet (2.7 m) long and 5 feet (1.5 m) in diameter, but little else, as there was no shelter for the brakesman who controlled its operation. The length of the wire rope differs wildly in different sources, ranging from 630 feet (190 m) to 1,890 feet (580 m). The twin tracks of the incline became a single track as it passed under the drum and then split again to form two tracks where the wagons were marshalled. This section was in a cutting, some 10 feet (3.0 m) deep, which curved around towards the north-west. The track continued through cuttings and on embankments until the marshalling loop at the foot of the Tai Muriau incline was reached.

The second incline raised the level of the track by another 175 feet (53 m) to reach the lower mill, which was later known as London Hall. At this point the tramway is on the 1,000-foot (300 m) contour. To the left of the incline, rubbish tramways from the mill served the mill tip. There was a network of tracks around the mill, and a second mill called the Cross Mill, where a 90 degree bend swung the route round to reach the foot of the main quarry incline, which rose in a north-easterly direction. This consisted of two sections, the first rising from floor 1 to floor 6, with a drumhouse as its head, and the second, continuing the same line, rising to floor 8, where there was a second drumhouse. The plan in Boyd shows a third incline on the tramway before the main quarry incline, but this is because the quarry incline is shown too far to the north-west.

=== Extension ===
Quarrying at Conglog, further up the Cwmorthin Valley, began in 1854, and in 1873 the Conglog Slate and Slab Co Ltd was registered, with a capital of £40,000. An agreement was reached in 1868, which would allow Conglog to lay rails down the valley, to connect to the existing Cwmorthin Tramway. All goods using the tramway would be subject to a toll of 6 pence (2.5p) per ton, with an additional amount payable to the Cwmorthin drivers, who operated the inclines. This was not pursued until 1874, when half of the partnership that ran Conglog was taken over by Charles John Sims. The Cwmorthin manager at the time was Joseph F Sims, and although it is not known if they were related, the success of the agreement may indicate that they were, since Rhosydd Quarry had been trying to reach an agreement for a tramway down the valley for years without success. The tramway was covered by a 21-year lease, and a requirement was that it should be no more than 18 inches (0.46 m) above the level of Llyn Cwmorthin by the time it reached Cwmorthin Terrace. This was to allow Cwmorthin Quarry to build a tramway from their Lake Mill across the end of Llyn Cwmorthin, to join with the Conglog tramway.

From the main Cwmorthin Quarry incline, the track was continued a little further up the valley floor to a loop and then a third incline, generally called the Lake incline, but labelled the Lower incline in Hancock. Just beyond the drumhouse, the tracks split, with the right hand branch crossing beside the lake to Cwmorthin's Lake Mill. The left hand branch was built with surplus materials from the Ffestiniog Railway, and reached the Conglog mill by a reversing siding. Beyond the mill, another incline was used to bring rock down from the workings. Under the terms of the lease, Conglog were responsible for operating the Lake incline, but when the lease ran out, Cwmorthin would become the owners of the section below the junction with their Lake Mill branch. They would make a payment for the rails and the incline drum. There is no further evidence for the takeover, but presumably it took place, since the incline was listed in a sale document dating from 1900 for Cwmorthin, when the Conglog Quarry was still operating. The length of the tramway from Conglog to the Ffestiniog Railway was 1 mile 1,440 yards (2.926 km).

Following the 1900 sale of Cwmorthin, it was taken over by Oakeley Quarry, working the same slate veins but from the other side of the Allt-fawr ridge. They began working the quarry through the mountain, and so there were no Cwmorthin men available to operate the inclines. In order to reduce the number of trips across the mountain to operate the tramway, they tried to insist that Conglog must run trains of 10 wagons or more, but this was not easy to achieve, and eventually a compromise was reached, whereby Cadwaladr Roberts, one of the consortium of men working the Conglog Quarry, could operate the inclines himself, at his own risk.

There is no evidence of working at Conglog after the early 1920s, and so presumably the extension tramway was unused after that. The Oakeley Quarry records show that the tramway was refurbished in 1936/37, but at the onset of the Second World War in 1939, Cwmorthin was mothballed, and traffic on the lower section ceased.

== Bibliography ==
- Boyd, James I.C. (1975). The Festiniog Railway 1800 - 1974; Vol. 2 - Locomotives and Rolling Stock; Quarries and Branches: Rebirth 1954-74. Blandford: Oakwood Press. ISBN 978-0-85361-168-4.
- Hancock, Celia (2006). Conglog Slate Quarry. Adit Publications. ISBN 978-0-9522979-4-9.
- Isherwood, Graham (1982). Cwmorthin Slate Quarry. Dolgellau: Merioneth Field Study Press. ISBN 978-0-946895-00-7.
- Richards, Alun John (1999). The Slate Regions of North and Mid Wales. Llanrwst: Gwasg Carreg Gwalch. ISBN 978-0-86381-552-2.
