= Moelwyn Mawr =

Mountain in Gwynedd, Wales

Coordinates: 52.98369°N 4.00044°W

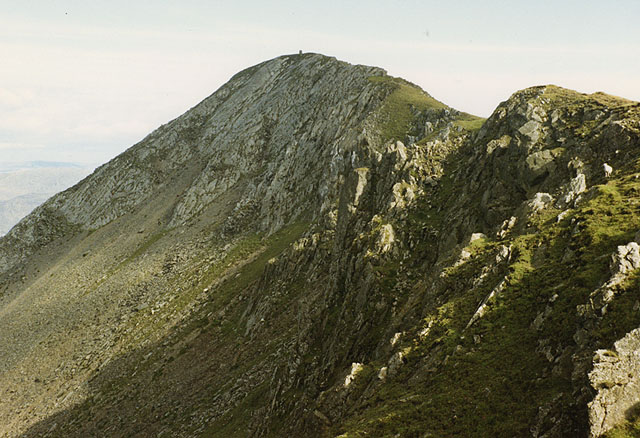
- Moelwyn Mawr summit ridge

Highest point
- Elevation: 770 m (2,530 ft)
- Prominence: 385 m (1,263 ft)
- Parent peak: Moel Siabod
- Listing: Marilyn, Hewitt, Nuttall

Naming
- English translation: great white hill
- Language of name: Welsh
- Pronunciation: Welsh: [ˈmɔɨlwɨn ˈmaur]

Geography
- Location: Gwynedd, Wales
- Parent range: Snowdonia
- OS grid: SH658448
- Topo map: OS Landranger 124

Listed summits of Moelwyn Mawr
| Name | Grid ref | Height | Status |
|---|---|---|---|
| Moelwyn Bach | | 710 m (2,330 ft) | Hewitt, Nuttall |
| Craigysgafn | | 689 m (2,260 ft) | sub Hewitt, Nuttall |
| Moel-yr-hydd | | 648 m (2,126 ft) | Hewitt, Nuttall |
| Moelwyn Mawr North Ridge Top | | 640 m (2,100 ft) | Nuttall |

Moelwyn Mawr is a mountain in Snowdonia, North Wales and forms part of the Moelwynion. Its summit overlooks the Vale of Ffestiniog and has views in all directions.

== Site of Special Scientific Interest ==
In 1990, Moelwyn Mawr was designated a Site of Special Scientific Interest of national scientific importance. The glaciated landscape of the mountain provides fine examples of two specific Pleistocene features. On the north-east flank of the mountain is a terrain of patterned ground, consisting of small-scale vegetated stripes. On the north side, a debris tongue formed by a rock glacier extends into Cwm Croesor.

== Quarrying ==
Slate quarrying was a major industry for many years in the Moelwynion. Moelwyn Mawr's flanks have several major quarries on them. To the north is Croesor Quarry perched high above Cwm Croesor. To the north east is Rhosydd Quarry on the col between Cwm Croesor and Cwm Orthin. Within Cwm Orthin, Conglog and Wrysgan quarries are located on the north slope of the mountain. Within Cwm Ystradau to the east lies Moelwyn Slate Quarry.

== Walking ==
A common hike combines both Moelwyn Mawr and Moelwyn Bach via the Craigysgafn ridge.

A steep climb to the summit (which has a trig point) allows views of areas that cannot be seen without climbing.

Moelwyn Mawr has a high reservoir, Llyn Stwlan, which is part of the Ffestiniog Power Station pumped-storage hydroelectric power plant in Tanygrisiau.

The walk over the main peaks in the Moelwyns, those being Moelwyn Mawr and Moelwyn Bach involves a walk up a disused incline, before gaining the grassy slopes of Moelwyn Mawr and onto the rockier Moelwyn Bach, before walking back down the road from the Stwlan Dam. Both the Snowdonia and Harlech Ordnance Survey maps are needed to cover the walk. Transport to the beginning may be done by car to Tanygrisiau or Ffestiniog, or by train from Llandudno Junction.
