= Allt-fawr =

Mountain in Gwynedd, Wales

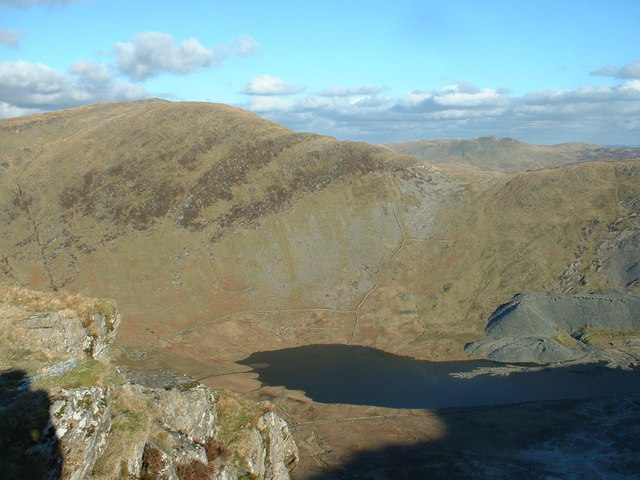
- Allt Fawr from the Rhosydd quarry

Highest point
- Elevation: 698 m (2,290 ft)
- Prominence: 243 m (797 ft)
- Parent peak: Moelwyn Mawr
- Listing: Marilyn, Hewitt, Nuttall
- Coordinates: 53°00′27″N 3°58′02″W

Naming
- English translation: big slope
- Language of name: Welsh
- Pronunciation: Welsh: [ˈaɬt ˈvau̯r]

Geography
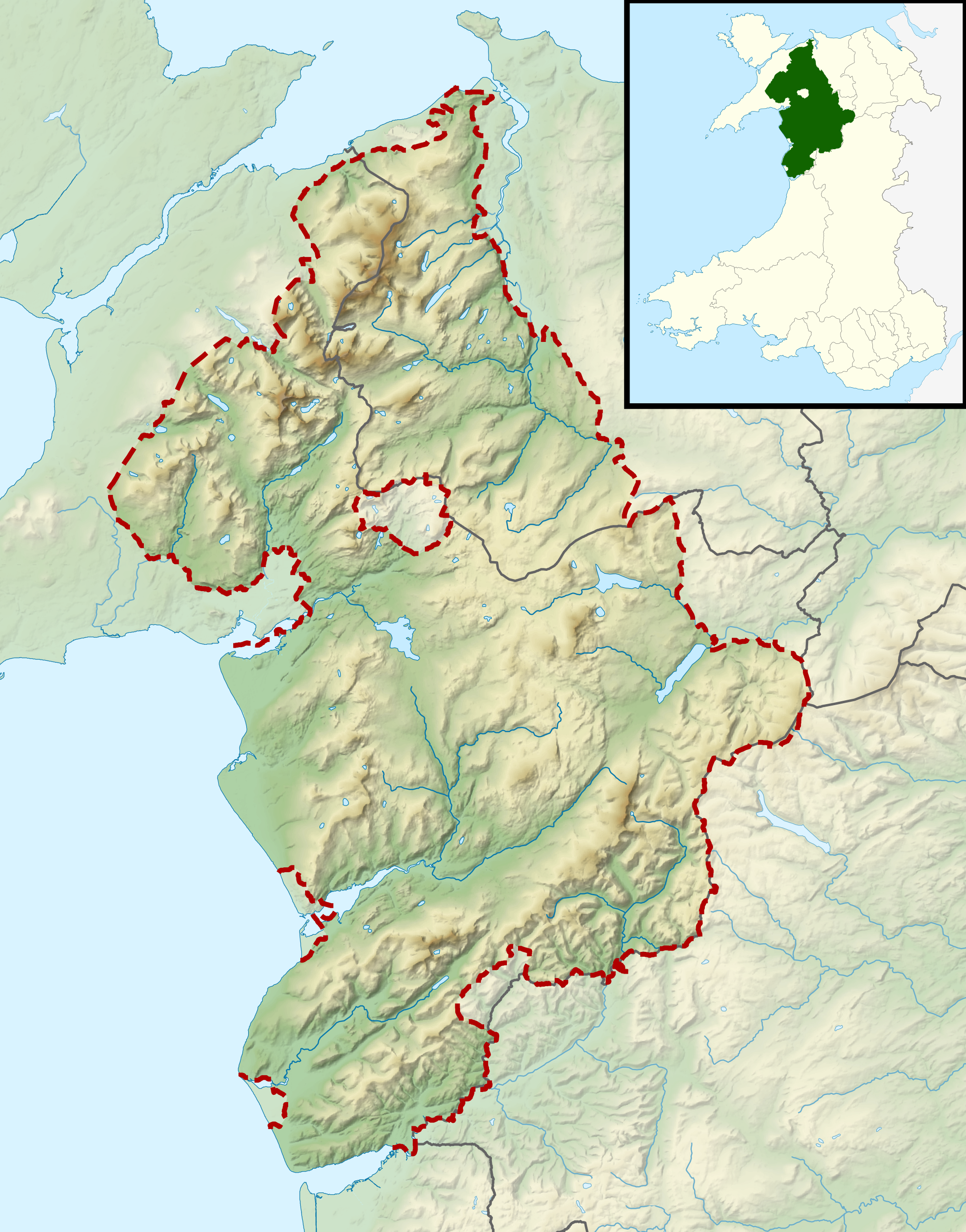
- Location within Snowdonia
- Location: Gwynedd, Wales
- Parent range: Snowdonia
- OS grid: SH681474
- Topo map: OS Landranger 115

Listed summits of Allt-fawr
Name	Grid ref	Height	Status
Cnicht		689 m (2,260 ft)	Hewitt, Nuttall
Moel Druman		676 m (2,218 ft)	Hewitt, Nuttall
Ysgafell Wen		672 m (2,205 ft)	Hewitt, Nuttall
Ysgafell Wen North Top		669 m (2,195 ft)	Hewitt, Nuttall
Moel Meirch		609 m (1,998 ft)	sub Hewitt

Allt-fawr is a mountain in Snowdonia, North Wales and forms part of the Moelwynion group.

It is on the internal border of Snowdonia National Park, and overlooks the town of Blaenau Ffestiniog, with its numerous slate quarries, as well as Llyn Ystradau and Ffestiniog Power Station in Tanygrisiau. On the northern slope of Allt-fawr is the Oakeley Quarry, the world's largest underground slate mine. On the southern slope is the large Cwmorthin Quarry. These two mines are joined underneath the summit of Allt-fawr and the extensive chambering and adits are visible on the surface of the mountain where underground workings have collapsed.

Between 1974 and 1997, the Gloddfa Ganol tourist attraction operated within the Oakeley Quarry on the south slope of the mountain.
