= Conglog quarry =

Former slate quarry in Wales

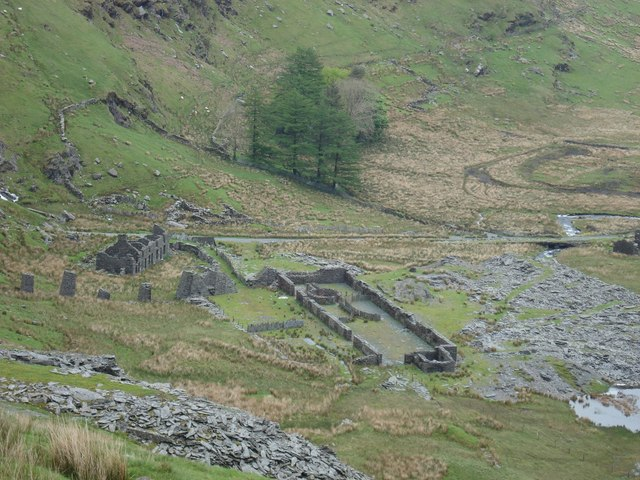
- The ruins of the mill (centre) and Tan-yr-Allt Cottages (left)

- Location in Gwynedd

Location
- Location: near Blaenau Ffestiniog, Gwynedd, Wales; 52.9999°N 3.9836°W

Production
- Products: Slate
- Type: Quarry

Conglog quarry was a small enterprise situated to the north-west of Tanygrisiau, near Blaenau Ffestiniog in Wales. It was overshadowed by the much bigger Rhosydd quarry a little further to the west. It was active from 1854 to 1910, and was operated by an individual, two partnerships and four separate companies over this period.

== History ==
Prior to 1854, the land on which the Conglog quarry was established was part of Cwmorthin Ucha farm, and was owned by William Ormsby-Gore, whose son, the Conservative politician John Ormsby-Gore, became Lord Harlech in 1876. He granted a two-year take-note to Robert Roberts and John Williams, both of Ffestiniog. Roberts was one of the surgeons at Oakeley quarry, and became the proprietor. He is thought to have provided the working capital to enable quarrying to begin. Williams was a quarryman. The take-note acted as temporary permission for the two men to extract minerals, in this case slate, and both men were named when the note was renewed in 1856 and in 1863. It is not known whether other men were employed to work the quarry during this period.

In 1866, only Roberts was named when the take-note was renewed, and he began trading as the Conglog Slate Company. The land he leased covered 177 acres (72 ha), and was mainly to the north of the stream and the track that ran through the site to reach Rhosydd. Shortly afterwards, Roberts was in possession of a 21-year lease, for which he was required to pay 2 shillings (10p) per ton for rock removed from the site, with a minimum charge of £25, corresponding to 250 tons, and an additional £2 per acre (£4.94/ha) for any land used for tipping waste rock. The Rhosydd Quarry had been operating since 1853, and their quarry manager's house, Plas Cwmorthin, was located to the east of the Conglog site. In 1865/6, they also built Tan-yr-Allt, a row of cottages close to the Conglog mill site, to house some of the Rhosydd workers and their families. Conglog's new lease covered a larger area than the earlier take-notes, and in 1871 there was a dispute with Rhosydd over land in the south-west corner of the leased land. Agreement was eventually reached, with each undertaking keeping a part of the disputed land, and further land to the south of the river could be used for tipping by both companies. Tan-yr-Allt cottages were retained by Rhosydd, although there were to be surrendered if Roberts should require them.

In order to develop the quarry, Roberts sub-let part of the land to W H B Kempe and T M Matthews, who were from Devon. They paid £900 plus £25 per year for the lease, with an additional £2 per acre for any land they used for tipping, and one-twelfth of the value of any slate which they produced. The Conglog Slate and Slab Company Ltd was set up in 1873, with a working capital of £40,000, derived from 4,000 shares valued at £10 each. Kempe and Matthews sold their 21-year lease to the company for £25,000, and used the money to buy 2,000 shares. Many of the remaining shares were held by residents of Devon. The two men then sold 375 of their shares to Joseph Kellow, who became the agent and quarry engineer, and whose nephew Moses was responsible for the developments at Croesor quarry from 1895. Kempe and Matthews developed the underground workings, and Kellow recommended that £15,000 of the capital should be used for this purpose.

All was not well, as Matthews left the undertaking in 1873, and assigned his part of the lease to another shareholder called Edward Betteley, despite the fact that the company should have owned it by then. Betterley then sold it to a manganese mine proprietor called Charles John Sims. Roberts left in 1874, assigned his part of the lease to Kempe and Sims. The Cwmorthin quarry, which was further down the valley, had been served by the Cwmorthin Tramway since 1850, which descended via the Tan y Muriau and Village inclines to connect to the Ffestiniog Railway. The tramway was extended up the valley in 1874, to reach the Conglog mill. Seven years later, the company was being wound-up. The man in charge of this was Thomas Horswill from Tavistock in Devon, who had been the accountant and secretary since the formation of the company in 1873. He discovered that Kempe and Matthews had never assigned their original lease to the company. As Kempe had died, and Matthews was "insane", this presented a problem, but somehow he managed to resolve it, and sold the lease to two of the shareholders, Betteley and Gillow, for £850, the latter a doctor from Torquay.

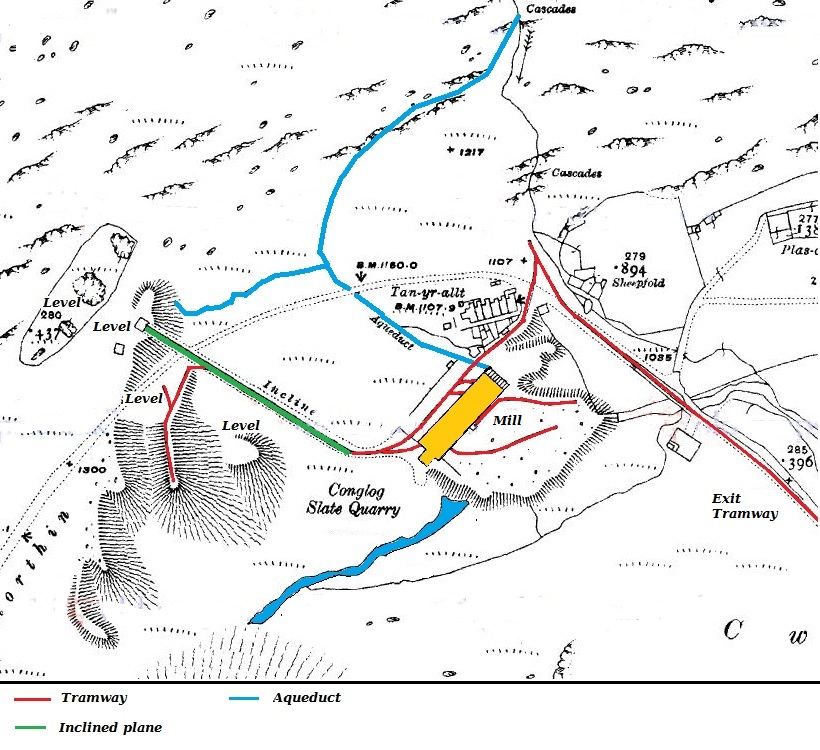
Map of the quarry in 1919, showing the mill (centre), the access tramway (right) and the levels (left)

Another company, the New Conglog Slate and Slab Company Ltd, was created, and bought the lease from Betteley and Gillow for £2,000. The capital was raised by issuing 80 shares valued at £25 each, and Gillow bought 65 of them. Horswill became the secretary of the new company, but after just four years, he recommended in 1885 that it too should be wound up, and another company formed to take it over. Roberts, who still held the primary lease, offered to alter its terms in 1886, but it is unclear whether this happened. In 1889, the 21-year lease ran out, and Roberts negotiated with the company for its renewal and extension. Although they agreed, the company had still not received a lease after 18 months, and went into liquidation in 1891. Roberts died the following year. Newspaper advertisements for the sale indicated that the company had assets of £2,011, £200 of stock, and liabilities of £3,621. No buyers were found, and the quarry was abandoned, without any machinery being removed. An agreement was made with Lord Harlech that any new tenant found to operate the quarry would pay £200 to take it over.

Ronald Robert Hamilton Lochart Ross Esq. took over the quarry in 1895, trading as Glyn Ffestiniog Quarry. He took out a 21-year lease, with a 7-year lease on the Cwmorthin tramway, and options to renew that for two further 7-year terms. He lasted until 1901, when he handed over the running of the quarry to a consortium of six quarrymen from Tanygrisiau. Although they traded as the Glyn Ffestiniog Slate and Slab Quarry, it was an informal partnership. 1902 and 1903 were the most productive years for the quarry, and from 1903, when Ross surrendered his lease, Cadwaladr Roberts, one of the six quarrymen, acted as agent. The last documented load of slate to leave the quarry was in 1909, and it closed in 1910.

== Transportation ==
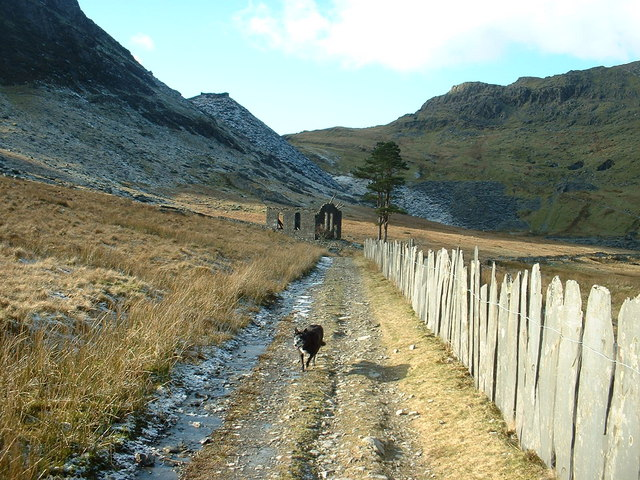
The Conglog exit tramway looking towards the quarry. The building was the Rhosydd Chapel. The slate waste to the right of the tree is from Conglog, and the incline to the levels is just to its right. The holes in the hillside above it are the tops of the level 'C' chambers.

In the absence of any firm evidence, slate probably left the quarry by horse and cart or by pack animal during the early phases of the quarry, but in 1868 an agreement was reached with Cwmorthin, which would allow the Conglog to lay rails down the valley. As part of the dispute which occurred with Rhosydd in 1871, they were also given permission to lay rails up to Rhosydd, and to use their incline down to the Croesor Tramway. A prospectus published in 1873 stated that it would be easy to build a tramway to the Croesor tramway, but this appeared to ignore the fact that the exit tramway from Rhosydd was 1,480 feet (450 m) above sea level, higher than the upper levels of Conglog, and much higher than the mill level. It is not known whether they were related, but Charles John Sims who became a leaseholder of Conglog in 1873, negotiated with the Cwmorthin manager, Joseph F Sims, and an agreement to build a connecting tramway was reached. Rhosydd had attempted to do the same for many years, and had eventually resorted to the route down Cwm Croesor to the west, because Cwmorthin would not give their consent. The track levels near Cwmorthin Terrace were agreed, as Cwmorthin wanted to build a tramway from their Lake Mill to join the new tramway. Just below the terrace, the new Lake Incline would drop the level to that of Cwmothin's Cross Mill and their exit tramway.

The tramway was built using old track materials from the Ffestiniog Railway. The track gauge was 1 ft 11 1/2 in (597 mm), as the wagons ran onto the Ffestiniog, although the track gauge above the mill was only nominally the same, as internal wagons had double flanged wheels which were loose on the axles. Operation of the Lake Incline was the responsibility of Conglog, although after 21 years, ownership would transfer to Cwmorthin, who would make a payment for the drum and the rails. This appears to have happened, although it is not documented, as the three inclines on the Cwmorthin main line were all listed in a sale document from 1900. Cwmorthin was bought by Oakeley quarry, after which they were connected underground, allowing it to be worked from the Oakeley side, and the absence of Oakeley men to operate the inclines was eventually resolved when Cadwaladr Roberts was given permission to operate them.

== Description ==
The area surrounding Blaenau Ffestiniog contains five workable veins of Ordovician slate, which follow a semi-circular path around the northern edge of the town. According to a prospectus issued by the Conglog Slate and Slab Company in 1873, three of them were accessible from the quarry, although there is no evidence that the third was ever worked or even found. The two that were found were the back vein and the north vein, and there is evidence for a total of ten chambers being worked in them. There were three access adits cut into the hill, numbered 1 to 3 from the top downwards. By 1903, these had been assigned the letters 'A' to 'D' from the bottom upwards, with 'D' being a new trial adit higher up the hillside. The level 'A' adit was cut for around 115 yards (105 m), but did not reach a vein. The level 'B' adit began just below the track to Rhosydd, and ran for some 272 yards (249 m). The adit ran through the back vein, where a small trial chamber was cut, and a little over half way along, a cross adit provided access to chambers in the north vein on both sides of the main adit. While the 'B' adit is vertically above the 'A' adit, the level 'C' adit followed a slightly more northerly course, and reached the back vein after a very short distance. Four chambers were worked in it. A plan produced in 1903 showed the adit running on to the north vein, and the beginnings of a chamber there, but this was not confirmed by a survey carried out in the 1980s. The level 'C' chambers are all open to daylight at the top.

The adits were about 60 feet (18 m) apart vertically, according to Horswill, who wrote to the Mining Journal in 1874. The upper levels are around 1,425 feet (434 m) above sea level, whereas the mill is just below the 1,120-foot (340 m) contour. A double-track inclined plane connected the level 'C' adit to the mill level, although wagons from level 'B' could also use it. Most of it was at an angle of 30 degrees, but it became shallower at the bottom. It was worked by gravity, with full wagons running down it raising empty wagons on the other track. Three tracks entered the mill, and additional tracks to the south carried rubbish onto tips. The mill was powered by a 30-foot (9.1 m) waterwheel, which was 4 feet (1.2 m) wide. Water was brought down the hillside in leats fed by several streams, and there were two sections of raised aqueduct or launder. Several of the slate pillars which supported the final launder to the wheel pit are still in situ.

== See also ==
- Slate industry in Wales

== Bibliography ==
- Boyd, James Ian Craig (1975). The Festiniog Railway - Vol 2. Oakwood Press.
- Hancock, Celia (2006). Conglog Slate Quarry. Adit Publications. ISBN 978-0-9522979-4-9.
- Isherwood, Graham (1982). Cwmorthin Slate Quarry. Merioneth Field Study Press. ISBN 978-0-946895-00-7.
- Richards, Alun John (1991). A Gazeteer of the Welsh Slate Industry. Gwasg Carreg Gwalch. ISBN 978-0-86381-196-8.
