= Foel Gron =

Peak in Snowdonia, Wales

Coordinates: 53.08893°N 4.15167°W

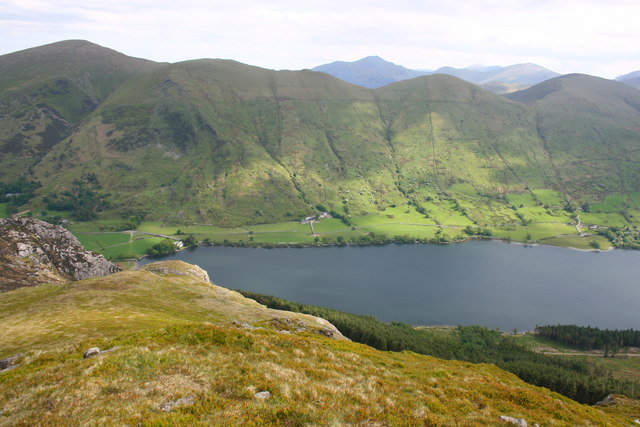
- From left to right: Moel Eilio, Foel Gron, Foel Goch and Moel Cynghorion from Mynydd Mawr

Highest point
- Elevation: 629 m (2,064 ft)
- Prominence: 31 m (102 ft)
- Listing: Hewitt, Nuttall

Naming
- English translation: round bare hill
- Language of name: Welsh
- Pronunciation: Welsh: [ˈvɔil ˈɡrɔn]

Geography
- Location: Gwynedd, Wales
- Parent range: Snowdonia
- OS grid: SH560568
- Topo map: OS Landranger 115

Foel Gron is a peak on the Moel Eilio ridge of hills/mountains in Snowdonia, North Wales. This ridge is used as a hiker's route from Llanberis to the summit of Snowdon.
