= Moel-yr-hydd =

Coordinates: 52°59′22″N 3°58′47″W

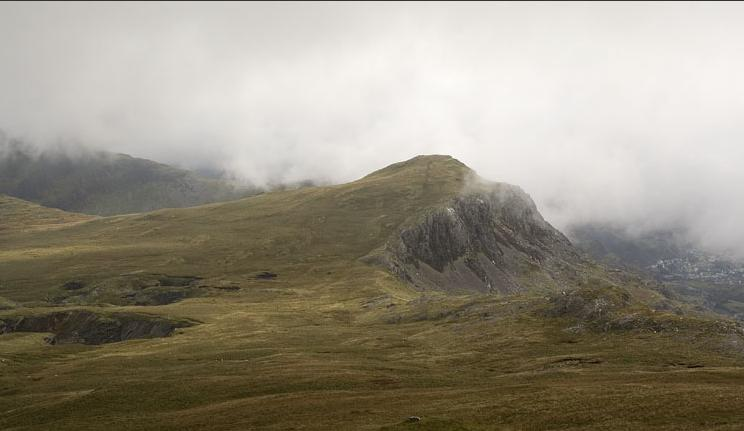
- Moel-yr-hydd from Moelwyn Mawr

Highest point
- Elevation: 648 m (2,126 ft)
- Prominence: 82 m (269 ft)
- Parent peak: Moelwyn Mawr
- Listing: Hewitt, Nuttall

Naming
- English translation: hill of the stag
- Language of name: Welsh
- Pronunciation: Welsh: [ˈmɔil ɐɾ ˈhɨːð]

Geography
- Location within Gwynedd
- Location: Gwynedd, Wales
- Parent range: Snowdonia
- OS grid: SH672454
- Topo map: OS Landranger 115

Moel-yr-hydd is a subsidiary summit of Moelwyn Mawr in Snowdonia, North Wales and forms part of the Moelwynion. (Strictly the mountain is not actually in the Snowdonia National Park as it falls within the exclusion "hole" around the former slate town of Blaenau Ffestiniog.)

The mountain overlooks the village of Tanygrisiau and Tanygrisiau railway station (a halt on the Ffestiniog Railway) from where the mountain can easily be ascended.

From the 1830s until 1946, Wrysgan Quarry was worked on the north east flank of the mountain. Substantial underground chambers were driven beneath the summit.
