= Ysgafell Wen North Top =

Summit in Snowdonia, North Wales

Coordinates: 53.01356°N 3.98840°W

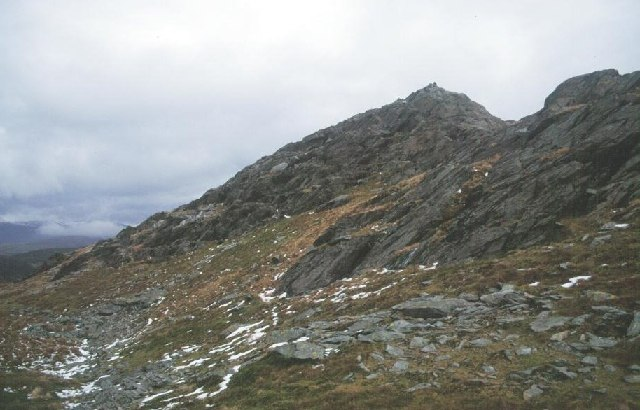
- Ysgafell Wen North Top summit

Highest point
- Elevation: 669 m (2,195 ft)
- Prominence: 33 m (108 ft)
- Listing: Hewitt, Nuttall

Naming
- English translation: white ledge
- Language of name: Welsh
- Pronunciation: Welsh: [ˈɐsɡəvɛɬ ˈwɛn]

Geography
- Location: Gwynedd / Conwy, Wales
- Parent range: Snowdonia
- OS grid: SH667481
- Topo map: OS Landranger 115

Listed summits of Ysgafell Wen North Top
Name	Grid ref	Height	Status
Ysgafell Wen Far North Top		650 m (2,133 ft)	Nuttall

Ysgafell Wen North Top is a peak on a ridge in Snowdonia, North Wales. It lies to the north of the highest summit on the ridge Ysgafell Wen. It is a subsidiary summit of Allt-fawr. The summit is located at the edge of Cwm Edno, an edge that falls steeply into the cwm.

Small lakes surround the summit, known as Llynnau'r Cwn (the dog lakes). To the west lies the peak's top, known as Ysgafell Wen Far North Top.
