= Ysgafell Wen =

Mountain in Conwy County Borough, Wales

Coordinates: 53.01356°N 3.98840°W

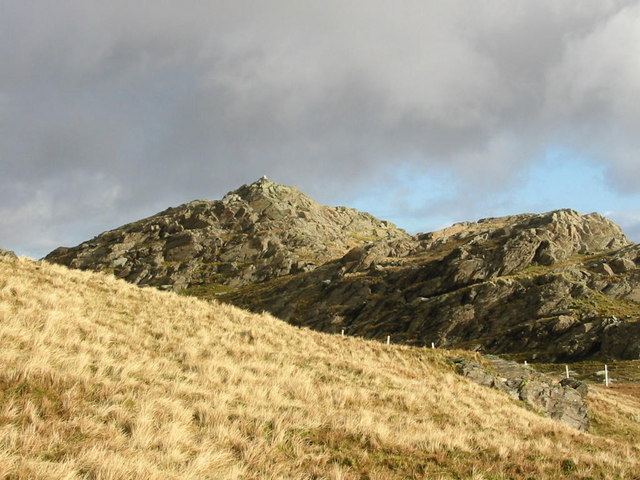
- Ysgafell Wen summit rocks

Highest point
- Elevation: 672 m (2,205 ft)
- Prominence: 57 m (187 ft)
- Listing: Hewitt, Nuttall

Naming
- English translation: white ledge
- Language of name: Welsh
- Pronunciation: Welsh: [ˈɐsɡəvɛɬ ˈwɛn]

Geography
- Location: Gwynedd / Conwy, Wales
- Parent range: Snowdonia
- OS grid: SH667481
- Topo map: OS Landranger 115

Ysgafell Wen is a subsidiary summit of Allt-fawr in Snowdonia, North Wales. It is the highest point on a broad ridge that stretches to the north-west of Moel Druman, and includes two other summits, Ysgafell Wen North Top. and Ysgafell Wen Far North Top.
