= Moelwyn Bach =

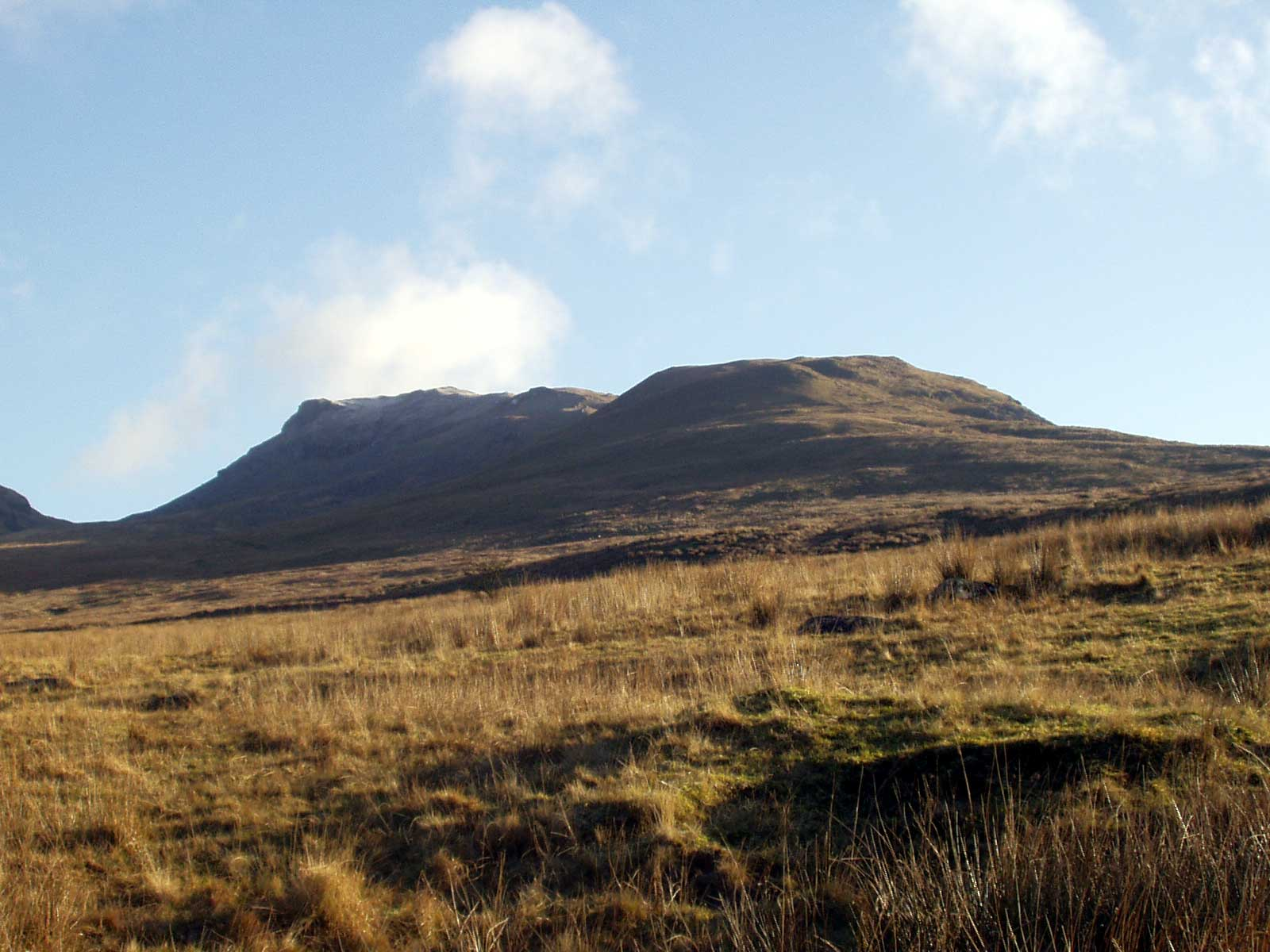
- Moelwyn Bach from the west

Highest point
- Elevation: 712 m (2,336 ft)
- Prominence: 127 m (417 ft)
- Parent peak: Moelwyn Mawr
- Listing: Hewitt, Nuttall, HuMP
- Coordinates: 52°58′26″N 3°59′49″W

Naming
- English translation: little white hill
- Language of name: Welsh
- Pronunciation: Welsh: [ˈmɔɨlwɨn ˈbaːx]

Geography
- Location within Gwynedd
- Location: Gwynedd, Wales
- Parent range: Snowdonia
- OS grid: SH660437
- Topo map: OS Landranger 124

Moelwyn Bach is a mountain in Snowdonia, northern Wales and forms part of the Moelwynion. It is connected to its parent peak Moelwyn Mawr via the Craigysgafn ridge.

It overlooks the town of Blaenau Ffestiniog and the Vale of Ffestiniog.
