= Ysgafell Wen Far North Top =

Hill in Gwynedd, Wales

Coordinates: 53.01356°N 3.98840°W

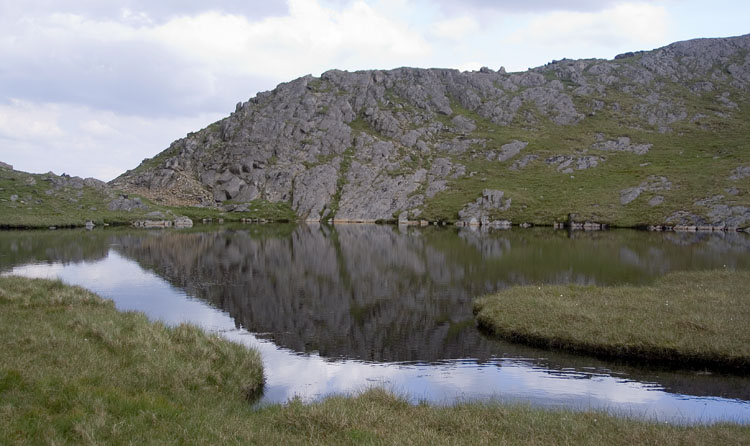
- The summit rocks from Llynnau'r Cwn

Highest point
- Elevation: 659 m (2,162 ft)
- Prominence: 15 m (49 ft)
- Listing: Nuttall

Naming
- English translation: white ledge
- Language of name: Welsh
- Pronunciation: Welsh: [ˈɐsɡəvɛɬ ˈwɛn]

Geography
- Location: Gwynedd / Conwy, Wales
- Parent range: Moelwynion
- OS grid: SH667481
- Topo map: OS Landranger 115

Ysgafell Wen Far North Top is a top of Ysgafell Wen North Top in Snowdonia, North Wales. It lies directly to the west of Ysgafell Wen North Top, and rises as a rocky outcrop from one of the dog lakes, Llynnau'r Cwn.
