= Moel Eilio =

Mountain in Snowdonia, Wales

Coordinates: 53.09688°N 4.15953°W

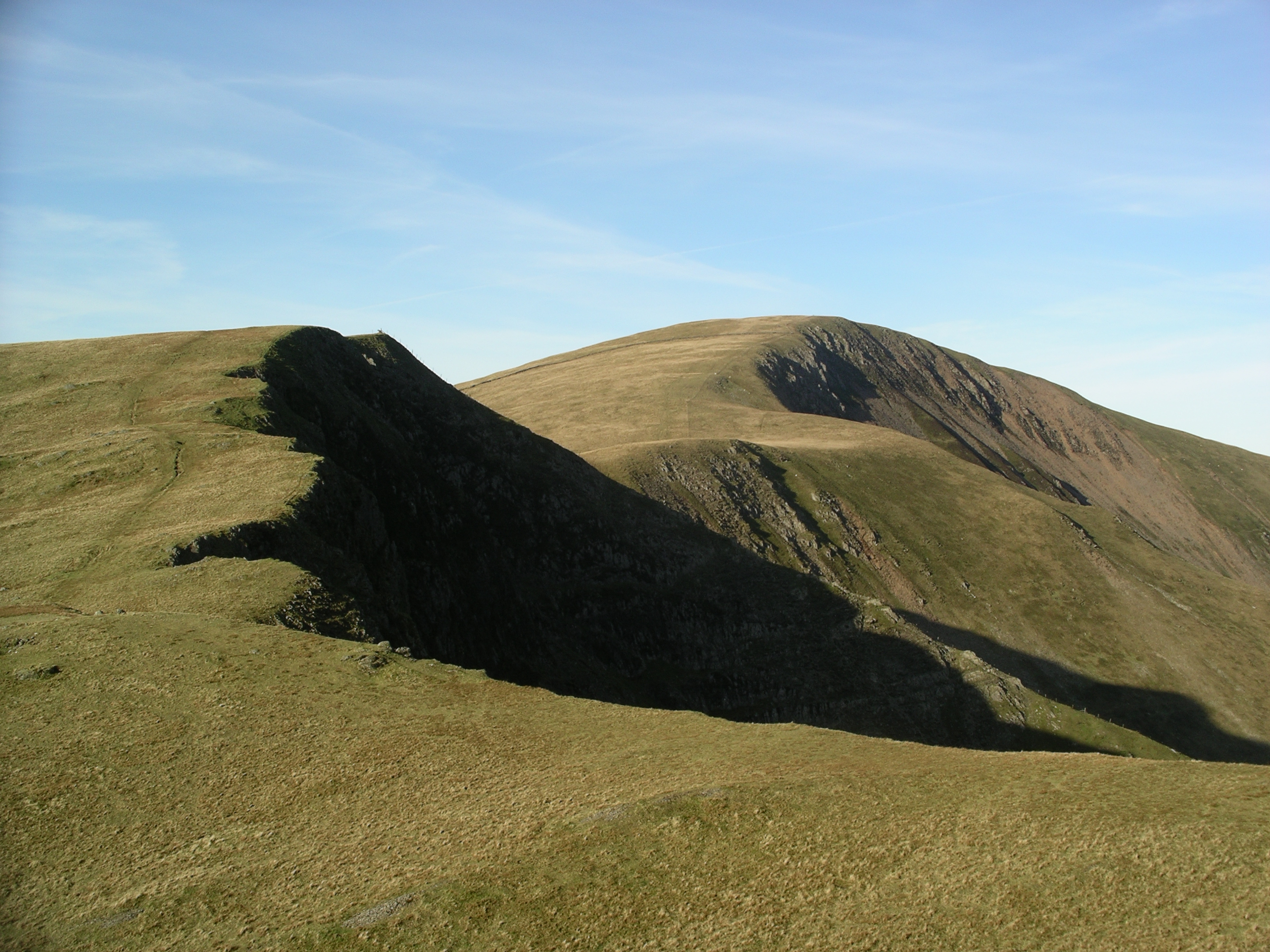
- Moel Eilio from the south

Highest point
- Elevation: 726 m (2,382 ft)
- Prominence: 259 m (850 ft)
- Parent peak: Snowdon
- Listing: Marilyn, Hewitt, Nuttall

Naming
- English translation: Eilio's hill
- Language of name: Welsh
- Pronunciation: Welsh: [mɔil eiliɔ]

Geography
- Location: Gwynedd, Wales
- Parent range: Snowdonia
- OS grid: SH555577
- Topo map: OS Landranger 115

Listed summits of Moel Eilio
Name	Grid ref	Height	Status
Foel Gron		629 m (2,064 ft)	Hewitt, Nuttall
Foel Goch (Eilio)		605 m (1,985 ft)	sub Hewitt

Moel Eilio is a mountain in Snowdonia, North Wales, that is situated approximately 3 miles north-west of Snowdon itself. It has two subsidiary tops, Foel Gron and Foel Goch (Eilio). The average annual temperature of the mountain is around 6 °C (43 °F). During the winter season, some significant accumulations of snowfall is known to take place on Moel Eilio, due to its relatively flat, grassy slopes.

A popular ascent starts from Llanberis and climbs by way of Bwlch y Groes and then the north ridge of the hill.

Moel Eilio, Foel Gron, Foel Goch and Moel Cynghorion form a curved ridge tracking generally south-west towards Snowdon and can provide a less common route to ascend Snowdon.

A small lake lies below the summit; Llyn Dwythwch.
