= Craigysgafn =

Coordinates: 52.97922°N 3.99874°W

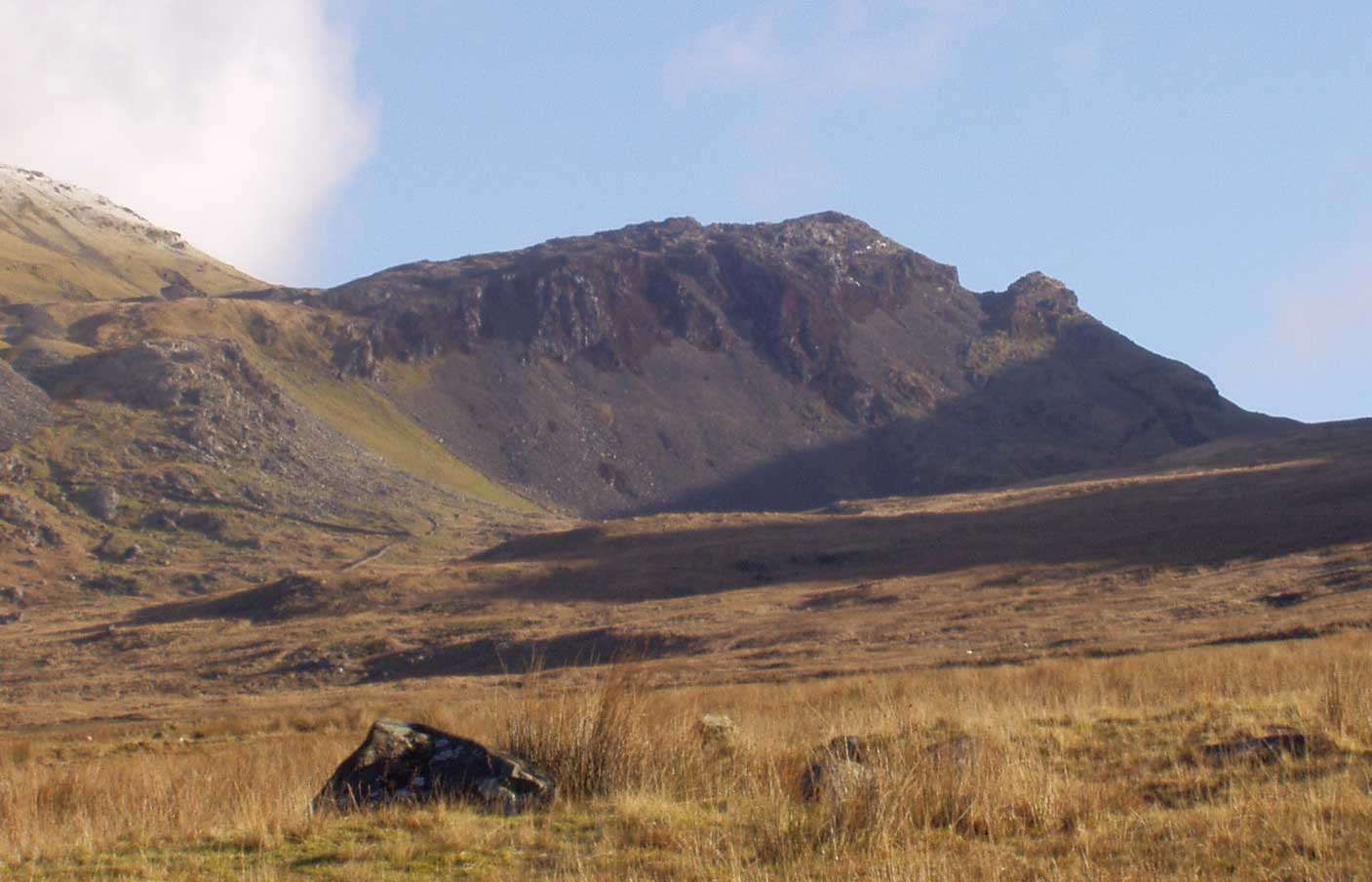

Highest point
- Elevation: 690 m (2,260 ft)
- Prominence: 27 m (89 ft)
- Listing: sub Hewitt, Nuttall

Naming
- English translation: mild crag
- Language of name: Welsh
- Pronunciation: Welsh: [ˈkræiɡ ˈɐsɡævn]

Geography
- Location: Snowdonia, Wales
- OS grid: SH659443
- Topo map: OS Landranger 124

Climbing
- Easiest route: Walk, Scramble

Craigysgafn is a rocky ridge and a top of Moelwyn Mawr that leads south from Moelwyn Mawr to Moelwyn Bach in Snowdonia, North Wales. It has several gullies which lead directly down to the scree slopes above Llyn Stwlan. Some scrambling is needed in places.
