= Moel Cynghorion =

Coordinates: 53.08514°N 4.11265°W

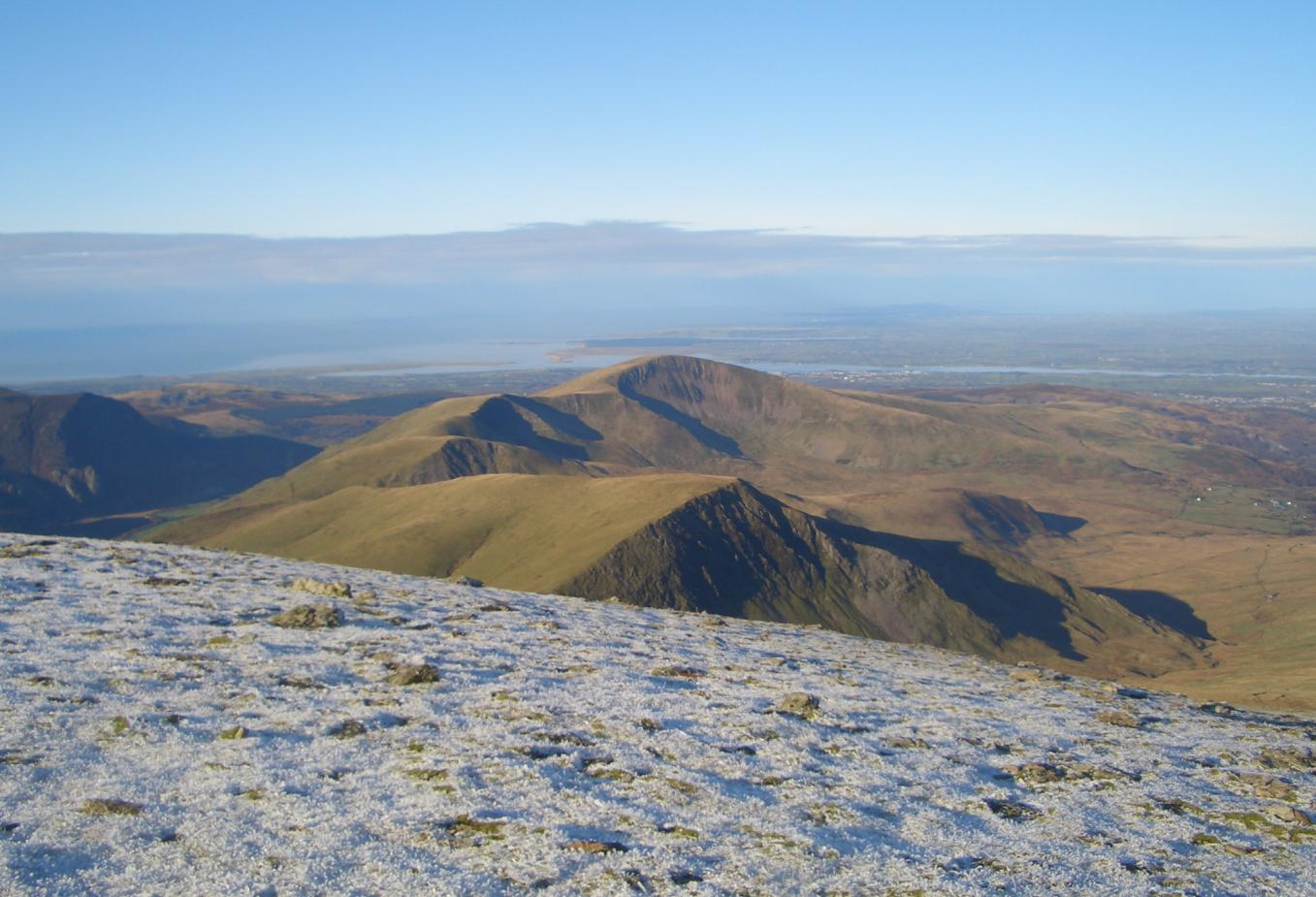
- Moel Cynghorion with Moel Eilio behind from Crib y Ddysgl.

Highest point
- Elevation: 674 m (2,211 ft)
- Prominence: 176 m (577 ft)
- Parent peak: Snowdon
- Listing: Marilyn, Hewitt, Nuttall

Naming
- English translation: (bare/treeless) hill of counsels
- Language of name: Welsh
- Pronunciation: Welsh: [ˈmɔil kəŋˈhɔrjɔn]

Geography
- Location: Gwynedd, Wales
- Parent range: Snowdonia
- OS grid: SH586563
- Topo map: OS Landranger 115

Moel Cynghorion (Welsh for 'the Hill of the Councillors') is a mountain in Snowdonia, North Wales. It lies two miles north-west of Snowdon, and forms part of the Moel Eilio Horseshoe walk. The summit is situated on a wide plateau, marked by a pile of stones. The southern slopes are gentle, while the northern aspect is precipitous. The summit has close views of Clogwyn Du'r Arddu and Snowdon (Yr Wyddfa). Views from the summit can extend as far as Holyhead in Anglesey to nearby towns and villages in Gwynedd such as Caernarfon, Llanrug and Llanberis. On a clear day the Wicklow Mountains in Ireland can be seen across the Irish Sea, at a distance of approximately 80 miles.
