= Ffestiniog Power Station =

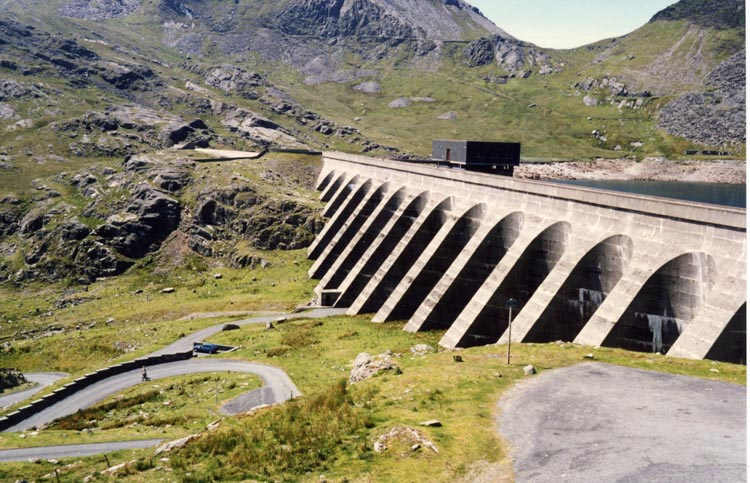
- The upper reservoir, Llyn Stwlan, and dam.
- Interactive map of Ffestiniog Power Station
- Country: Wales
- Location: Tanygrisiau, Ffestiniog, Gwynedd
- Coordinates: 52°58′51″N 03°58′08″W
- Opening date: 1963
- Owner: First Hydro

Upper reservoir
- Creates: Llyn Stwlan

Lower reservoir
- Creates: Llyn Ystradau

Power Station
- Pump-generators: 4
- Installed capacity: 360 MW (480,000 hp)

The Ffestiniog Power Station (Welsh pronunciation) is a 360-megawatt (MW) pumped-storage hydroelectricity scheme near Ffestiniog, in Gwynedd, north-west Wales. The power station at the lower reservoir has four water turbines, which can generate at full capacity within 60 seconds of the need arising. The scheme has a storage capacity of around 1.44 GWh (5.2 TJ) at maximum output for four hours, and the capacity to power the whole of North Wales for several hours.

The station, commissioned in 1963, was the first major pumped storage system in the UK. The upper reservoir is Llyn Stwlan, 170,000 cubic metres (6,000,000 ft^{3}), which discharges 27 cubic metres per second (950 cu ft/s) of water to the turbine generators at the power station on the bank of Tanygrisiau reservoir. The building of the lower reservoir increased the size of Llyn Ystradau and flooded the route of the Ffestiniog Railway which had to build a deviation around the reservoir and power station.

The plant is operated by First Hydro, a UK company owned by a joint venture of International Power and Mitsui & Co., and has an average efficiency of 72–73%, i.e. it uses 39% more electricity (when pumping the water back up to the Llyn Stwlan) than it actually produces.

== History ==
The idea of using pumped storage as a way of coping with rapid, short-term changes in the demand for electricity in England and Wales was first considered in 1948, and having found a suitable site, the Ffestiniog station was authorised by an act of Parliament, specifically the North Wales Hydro-Electric Power Act 1955. The first task facing engineers was to provide access roads to the sites, and work on constructing these started in 1957. This enabled work to commence on the two dams and the power station shortly afterwards. A pumped storage scheme requires two reservoirs at different levels, and the upper reservoir was created by enlarging Llyn Stwlan, high up on Moelwyn Mawr. Llyn Stwlan was located in a cirque basin, formed by glacial erosion.

== Project development and specification ==
Llyn Stwlan had previously been enlarged in 1898 by the Yale Electricity Company, who built a dam and used the water to generate power at Dolwen, located near Tanygrisiau, below the lower reservoir. The company was formed by the Votty Quarry company, and direct current was transmitted by overhead line to Dolgarregddu, near the centre of Blaenau Ffestiniog, where there was a 75 kW (101 hp) gas engine and two semi-diesel engines, which generated an additional 240 kW. This was used to supply power to the town when it was not required by the quarry. Because of the voltage drop in the system, a final 48 kW booster set was needed at the quarry. The Dolwen station continued to operate after the new scheme was finished, although it was subsequently decommissioned and the building was converted into two semi-detached houses, and then an 8-bedroom detached house.

For the new scheme, the cirque basin was dammed at its eastern end by a concrete gravity buttress dam, 244 m (801 ft) long, and a maximum of 34 m (112 ft) high above its foundations. There is a spillway at the southern end of the dam, with an overflow level at 500 m (1,600 ft) above ordnance datum (AOD). The dam contains 170,000 m^{3} (6,000,000 ft^{3}) of water, and the water level rises and falls by 20.0 metres (65.6 ft) as the station operates. The catchment area for Llyn Stwlan is 65 hectares (160 acres), and the average yearly rainfall over this area is 3,000 mm (120 in). The access roadway runs up to the northern side of the dam, and along the top to reach a bridge, which provides access to the intake towers.

The lower reservoir was formed by building another concrete gravity dam across the natural basin of Afon Ystradau. The dam is around 550 m (1,800 ft) long, with a maximum height of 25 m (82 ft) above its foundations, although most of it is well concealed, as the spoil from the foundations was used to cover the downstream face of the structure. Because of the larger area of the lower reservoir, it rises and falls by only 5.5 m (18 ft) during the daily operation of the station. Several streams flow off the surrounding land into the reservoir, and these flows are monitored, so that an equivalent amount of water can be discharged into the Afon Barlwyd through regulators in the dam. The levels of Tanygrisiau Reservoir are carefully monitored, to ensure that there is always sufficient spare capacity to hold the balance of the water left in Llyn Stwlan. The catchment area for Tanygrisiau Reservoir is 959 hectares (2,370 acres) and the average yearly rainfall is 2,160 mm (85 in). The reservoir is designed for a maximum water level of 188 m (617 ft) AOD, and there is a spillway set at a height of 0.84 m (2.8 ft) above this.

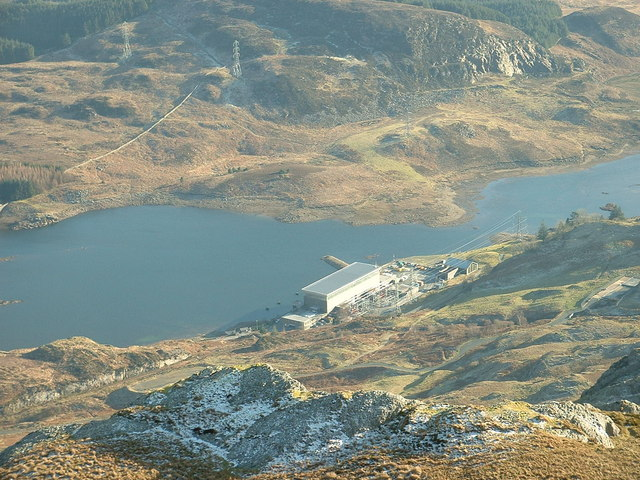
The main building and Tanygrisiau Reservoir

The main power station building is 72 m (236 ft) long and 22 m (72 ft) wide. In order to accommodate the vertical shafts of the machines, 140,000 tons on rock were excavated, and the building extends 34 m (112 ft) below the operating floor, which is at ground level. There are four lower floors, and working downwards, these are the alternator floor, the turbine floor, the pump floor and the pump basement. The height of the building above ground level is 20 m (66 ft). The main building is flanked by two single storey blocks, the southern one used for the control room and the northern one for administration. The main building is steel framed with an inner brick wall and a cavity. The outer wall is faced with local stone, of a type which has been used for a number of significant buildings in the Vale of Ffestiniog, but it proved difficult to find a source. A disused quarry was tracked down with help from retired quarrymen, but there was insufficient stone to complete the project, and it was problematic to use modern extraction methods. Some of the stone was therefore sourced from a second quarry.

Within Llyn Stwlan, there are two intake towers, which house equipment to control the shutoff gates. The gates are 14.5 ft (4.4 m) square, and can be dropped into position to prevent water entering the tunnels to the power station. Below them are two pressure shafts, which descend vertically for 195 m (640 ft). They are 4.4 m (14 ft) in diameter, and are lined with concrete. Each of them feeds two pressure tunnels, which slope down towards the power station. The first 550 m (1,800 ft) are of concrete construction, and are 3.3 m (10 ft 10 in) in diameter. There is then a transition, and the final 610 m (2,000 ft) are steel lined, with a diameter of 2.9 m (9 ft 6 in). The pipes terminate at a tunnel portal which is about 183 m (600 ft) from the main building. The final pipes into the station are 2.3 m (7 ft 7 in) in diameter, and are made of high-tensile steel, 25 mm (0.98 in) thick, which are encased in 0.69 m (2 ft 3 in) of pre-stressed concrete. Each pipe forks, with the upper branch supplying the turbine, when the station is generating, and the lower branch receiving water from the pump when it is returning water to Llyn Stwlan. Valves of 1.8 m (5.9 ft) and 1.68 m (5 ft 6 in) diameter are used to route the water appropriately.

=== Equipment ===
The equipment, supplied by the English Electric Company, installed in the main building consists of four vertically mounted motor/generator units, rated at 90 MW each, which are located on the alternator floor. Sitting above each, and directly coupled to the motor/generator, is a Francis turbine. When generating, water is supplied to these at 28.3 cubic metres per second (1,000 cu ft/s). The pumps are located below the motor/generators, and are connected to them by a clawtype coupling. In pumping mode, these deliver 21.1 cubic metres per second (750 cu ft/s) against a head of 28 m (92 ft), and consume 75 MW. The plant operates at 428 revolutions per minute in both modes, and when generating produces power at 16 kV. Each machine is connected to an oil circuit breaker, and sets of two machines are connected in parallel to twin 16/275 kV transformers. The 275 kV supply is carried by overhead power lines, and is fed into the National Grid nearby at the site of the former Trawsfynydd nuclear power station.

Water is pumped from Tanygrisiau Reservoir to Llyn Stwlan during the night, when there would normally be insufficient demand for the electricity produced by relatively efficient steam plant. During the day, the station is used to generate electricity at periods of peak demand. Typically, it pumps for six or seven hours in the night, and generates for around four hours during the day. It is also used to provide power at short notice if there is a breakdown in another part of the system, or an unexpected increase in demand. A particular problem is the huge rise in demand at the end of popular television programmes, and the station can be brought online very quickly to cover this, providing an additional 360 MW of power in under a minute.

== Amenity ==
Beginning in 1953 and 1954, the CEGB had carried out extensions to some existing hydro-electric generating stations, located in North Wales, and although they were small in scale, they had learned valuable lessons which were carried forwards to the new project. Thus the enabling Act of Parliament included an amenity clause, which included provision of a landscape consultant, who would liaise with the National Parks Commission, to ensure that issues connected with the disposal of spoil, the planting and felling of trees and bushes, and the reinstatement of land affected by the construction, were adequately addressed. It was the first of the CEGB's power station projects to require the services of a landscape consultant from the outset. Local planning authorities were consulted, concerning the location and external appearance of all aspects of the project, and the Royal Fine Art Commission was also involved in the process. Perspective drawings showing the power station in its landscape were displayed at the Royal Academy of Arts in 1958.

One issue was the disposal of nearly a million tons of rock. This came from the excavation of the underground levels of the main station building, from the construction of the tunnels, and also from the foundations for the two dams. Rock from the upper dam was placed in the reservoir, where it is permanently covered by water. Around three-quarters of the lower dam has been hidden from view behind spoil tipped in front of the downstream face, and the rest of the spoil has been placed near the tunnel portals. The rock has been carefully profiled and covered with peat, before being sown with grasses which are native to the area. Some locations have been planted with trees and shrubs, including the weed rhododendron, willow and Scots pine. When the station was first opened, it included a public reception centre, from where guided tours of the site were available to visitors.

== Railways and quarries ==
=== Railways ===
Restoration of the Ffestiniog Railway as a tourist railway had begun in 1952, but the construction of the power station would sever the link between Porthmadog and Blaenau Ffestiniog by flooding the northern portal of the Moelwyn Tunnel and the trackbed to its north, and constructing access roads along the trackbed to the south of Tanygrisiau station. Railway restoration was in its infancy in Britain, and although the Ffestiniog Railway opposed the Bill during its final stages through Parliament, the scheme was written off as "old gentlemen and boys playing trains". The Act of Parliament to authorise the power station was granted on 16 May 1955. The Railway received a "Notice to Treat" on 5 February 1956, and a "Notice to Enter", which can normally be up to three years after the first notice, on the following day. Moelwyn Tunnel was requisitioned on 2 June 1958, with two days between the notices.

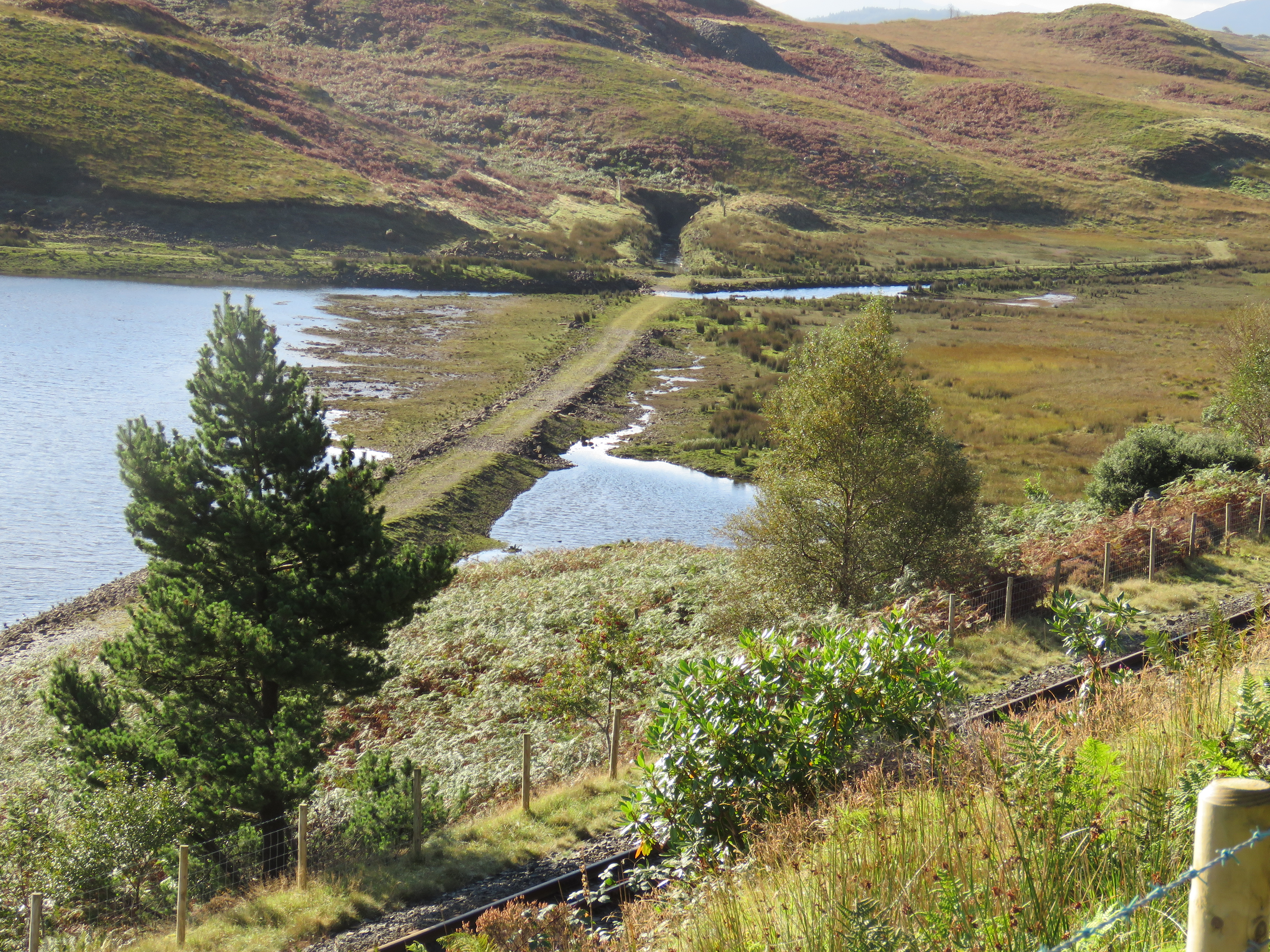
The old route of the Ffestiniog Railway, showing the northern portal of Moelwyn Tunnel, often submerged below the waters of Tanygrisiau Reservoir, but visible here because of low water levels. The replacement FR route is in the foreground.

The Ffestiniog Railway began legal proceedings to obtain reasonable compensation for the loss of their line in 1956, and it had become the longest case in British legal history by the time it was finally settled in 1972, sixteen and a half years later. Relationships between the two parties were not good in the early days, as the CEGB were convinced that the Ffestiniog Railway board had bought a moribund railway in order to pocket the compensation themselves. Charles Goode produced plans for a new route along the western side of the lake, which it was agreed would be incorporated into the plans. However, the CEGB then moved the location of the switching station, rendering the route impractical, and the consulting engineers Livesay & Henderson produced an east side route, which was much more expensive to implement. The Ffestiniog Railway was aiming for "equivalent reinstatement", where the British Electricity Authority, subsequently the Central Electricity Generating Board, would pay the full cost of building a replacement route. Based on the cost of the east side route, the Lands Tribunal ruled that equivalent reinstatement would only be justified if passenger number were to rise from 76,000 to 196,000, which was not deemed to be "within the bounds of the possible", despite the fact that these figures were reached in 1967.

Eventually, a scheme called "deferred maintenance" was devised, and formed the basis for the final payout. Pressure was applied to the CEGB during the final hearings at the Lands Tribunal, to allow a west side route, and the Ffestiniog Railway were awarded £65,000, an interest payment of £30,000, and legal costs. The full text of the decision is published in Brian Hollingworth's book, and fills fifteen pages. Whereas most of the reinstated route, which included a spiral at Dduallt and a new Moelwyn Tunnel, was built by volunteers, the section immediately behind the power station was built by Sir Alfred McAlpine (Northern) Ltd, as it included four buried bridges to carry the trackbed over the inlet penstocks to the power station.

=== Quarries ===
Moelwyn Slate Quarry is located above the enlarged Llyn Stwlan. It was worked sporadically between the 1820s and 1897, but was connected to the Ffestiniog Railway by a spectacular series of seven inclines, descending some 335 metres (1,099 ft). Most are still visible in the landscape, but the enlargement of Llyn Stwlan destroyed the sixth incline, parts of the fifth and seventh, and much of the abandoned mill area, which was located between the fourth and fifth inclines, rather than at the quarry level, in order to benefit from the water supply provided by the lake. There are a number of inspection hatches and electric cabinets on the inclines, which are presumably connected with the power station infrastructure.

To the north-west, on the other side of Moelwyn Mawr, lies the Croesor Quarry, where extraction of slate ceased in 1930. Following the end of the Second World War, the quarry was operated by Cookes Explosive, a local firm based at Penrhyndeudraeth, who used its underground chambers to store explosives, mainly propellants. In 1971, the Central Electricity Generating Board became aware of this use, and calculated that if there was an explosion underground, either of their two dams could be damaged. They therefore drained both reservoirs, and Cookes began removing about 250 tons of explosives per week, which were taken to Penrhyndeudraeth or by rail from Blaenau Ffestiniog railway station to various other ICI Nobel works in the United Kingdom.

== See also ==
- List of energy storage projects
- List of power stations in Wales
