= Cwmorthin quarry =

Disused slate quarry in North Wales

Cwmorthin Quarry
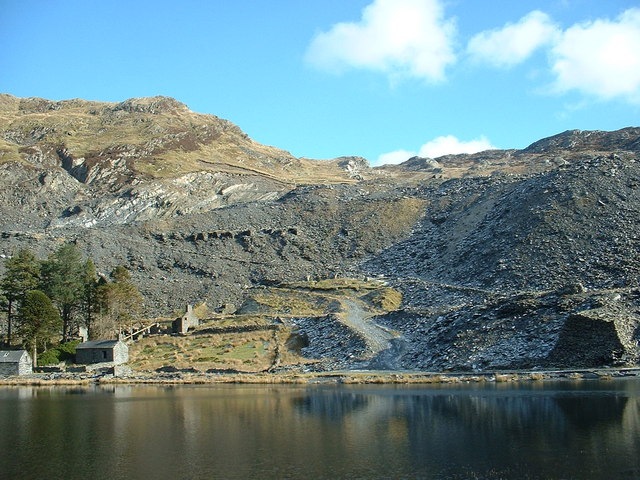
- View of Cwmorthin Quarry across Llyn Cwmorthin

- Location in Gwynedd
- Location: Wales, Gwynedd, UK; 52.9942°N 3.9671°W grid reference SH680459

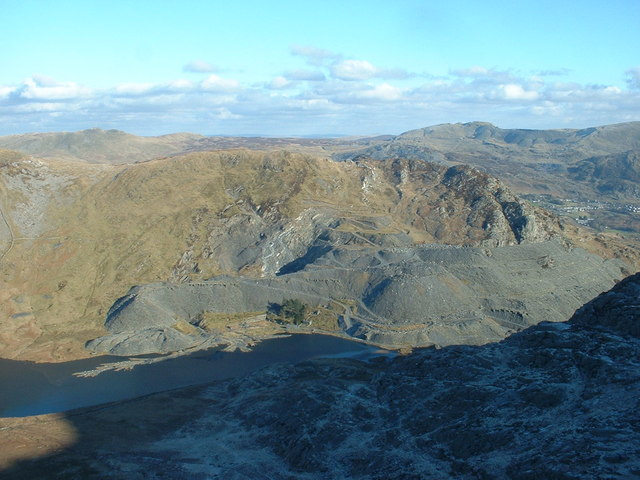
View of Cwmorthin Quarry from the south

Cwmorthin quarry was a slate quarry west of the village of Tanygrisiau, north Wales. Quarrying on the site started in 1810. In 1860 it was connected to the Ffestiniog Railway. In 1900 it was acquired by the nearby Oakeley quarry and the two were connected underground. In 1970 it closed along with Oakeley. There was small-scale working in the 1980s and 1990s, and the mine finally closed in 1997.

== History ==
Slate extraction began at Cwmorthin in 1810, when a small quarry was opened on the site by the Casson family who were also working the Diphwys Casson quarry, further to the east. Two of the five Blaenau Ffestiniog slate veins outcropped near where the quarry started, and it is not known whether the early workings were on the Old Vein or the Back Vein, as all evidence has been destroyed by later workings.

The veins sloped downwards at angles of between 20 and 45 degrees, and to avoid the expense of removing large volumes of the overlying rock, the quarry soon became a mine, as the chambers followed the vein below ground. This early quarrying lasted for about twenty years, but had ceased by 1830.

In 1840, working began again, when John Edwards and his partner Magnes obtained a lease, which was transferred to W B Chorley from London later that year. Chorley's involvement with the quarry continued until about 1860. He employed Allen Searell as an Agent for the quarry in 1844, and correspondence between the two men is held by the library at Bangor University, formerly the University of North Wales. In the late 1850s, Chorley began to lose interest in the enterprise, and Searell moved on to the Hafon y Llan Quarry near Beddgelert.

From about 1859, the quarry appears to have been worked by a group of men under an informal arrangement. They leased a wharf at Porthmadog harbour in 1860, until the Cwmorthin Slate Company was formed in January 1861. This had an authorised capital of £100,000, and the company bought the Cwmorthin Isaf estate and part of Tanygrisiau village on 25 July 1861. Work began on underground mining. At some point, the 1 ft 11 1/2 in (597 mm) Cwmorthin Tramway was constructed to connect the quarry with the nearby Ffestiniog Railway at Tanygrisiau. Isherwood states that it was soon after the new company took over in 1861 but Boyd suggests that a survey was carried out in the mid-1840s, and that it was completed in 1850. It was mentioned in the 1850 edition of Cliffe's The Book of North Wales, and the Ffestiniog Railway accounts recorded the first passage of loaded slate wagons down the line in that year. An existing siding at Tanygrisiau, which had served horse-drawn wagons from the quarry, was removed shortly afterwards.

The first dressing mill, where the blocks of slate were split and dressed to form roofing slates, was situated on the eastern shore of Llyn Cwmorthin, and was known as Lake Mill. A second mill, the Cross Mill, was built a little further down the valley, as a result of which water from Llyn Cwmorthin could be used to feed a water wheel, which powered the dressing machinery. Two rope-worked inclined planes allowed the tramway to negotiate the difference in level between the mill and the Ffestiniog Railway. The connection of the final incline to the railway was deemed to be dangerous by a Board of Trade inspector in 1864, as there were no trap points to prevent runaway wagons running onto the main line. As a result, the Ffestiniog Railway had to install distant signals and a telegraph connection to the winding house at the incline summit. Trains were not allowed to run along the main line while the incline was in use.

Output from the quarry steadily increased, from 350 tons in 1862, to 12,500 tons of finished slate in 1876. Some 96,000 tons of slates left the quarry between 1861 and 1876. Based on typical figures for the region, that 1 ton of finished material was produced from 10 tons of quarried rock, this would indicate that around 1 million tons of rock were extracted during this period. The waste rock was initially tipped around the edge of the two surface workings, known as the North and South Sinks, but was later tipped in a series of terraces to the east of the workings, which eventually covered up the South Sink. The quarry gained a reputation for poor working conditions and was known locally as "The Slaughterhouse". Between 1875 and 1893 there were 21 deaths in Cwmorthin out of a workforce of around 550. Following the passing of the Metalliferous Mines Regulation Act 1872 (35 & 36 Vict. c. 77), all mines were required to keep records of their operations, and to report fatal injuries, some details of the men and boys employed, and the output of the mine. Like many slate mines, Cwmorthin argued that it was a quarry, and that the law did not apply to them. Following a fatal accident in 1875, a test case was brought against them, and the enterprise was deemed to be a mine under the terms of the Act. The company went into liquidation shortly afterwards.

=== New Cwmorthin Company ===
A new Cwmorthin Company was formed in 1876 following the collapse of the original company. To the north of the quarry, on the other side of the Allt-fawr ridge, the Welsh Slate Company, the Rhiwbryfdir Slate Company and Holland's Slate Company were all working the same veins. They were on land owned by the Oakeley family, and worked under leases, which placed restrictions on how they could be worked, and the royalties they had to pay. Cwmorthin was not restricted in this way, because they owned the freehold.

The waste tips eventually covered Cwmorthin Isaf farmhouse, and the company and some of its workers built houses in Dolrhedyn, just above Tanygrisiau. On the surface, the boundary between the Oakeley's Tan-y-Bwlch estate and the Cwmorthin Isaf estate was marked by cast iron markers, which can still be seen, but below ground, the boundary was less clearly defined, and there were disputes over whether the companies were encroaching on each other's territory. This was resolved by an agreement in 1876, which survived several changes of ownership for the Oakeley Quarries, but following the death of Mary Oakeley in 1880, William Edward Oakeley got into financial difficulties, and the Oakeley Slate Quarries Company Limited was formed in 1884 to manage the quarries. Although a new agreement was drawn up between the Oakeley and Cwmorthin companies in 1884, Cwmorthin plans showed workings described as "encroachments", and Oakeley plans showed "trespass chambers ceded to Oakeley".

Relationships deteriorated later in 1884, when most of the Cwmorthin workings in the Back Vein collapsed. The ground above the workings was fractured, right up to the top of Allt-fawr, where Llyn Bach, which supplied water to Holland's workings, was drained as a result. The fall had disastrous consequences for Cwmorthin, with production falling from 11,600 tons in 1884 to 6,900 tons in 1886. About half of the mine became inaccessible. In order to develop the quarry further, they had to open new chambers below the level of Llyn Cwmorthin. This was costly, as development work produced little productive slate, and there were additional costs for pumping and for machinery to raise the rock up to the level of the mills. Between 1876 and 1888, 132,866 tons of slate were shipped, but the burden of development was too great, and led to the winding up of the company in 1888.

During this period, another test case had been brought against the company in 1879. Again, the issue concerned whether the undertaking was a mine or a quarry, but in this instance, which related to the assessment of profits, it was deemed to be a quarry. In 1882, the quarry employed over 500 men, and slates were produced in three mills, two of which were powered by water wheels and one by a steam engine. The mills contained around 50 rock saws and 50 dressing machines.

=== New Welsh Slate Company ===
On the other side of Allt Fawr, the Welsh Slate Company workings were in a poor state in 1884, and a major fall, now called the Great Fall, occurred, when some 6.25 million tons of rock collapsed into the workings. A legal battle followed, to establish whether compensation was due to the Oakeley Estate or to the Oakeley Slate Quarries Company. Ultimately, the Welsh Slate Company lost the case, but rather than pay the compensation, they surrendered their lease, retaining their profits and quite a bit of their capital. When the Cwmorthin Company failed, they formed the New Welsh Slate Company in 1889 and bought the Cwmorthin freehold for £83,000. Directors of the new company, which had an authorised capital of £65,000 included the Hon. Evelyn Ashley, formerly a director of the Welsh Slate Company, and the MP Joseph Howard. The Agent was Robert Owen, who had held the same position in the previous company. This upset the Oakeley Company, as he had been blamed by them for the Great Fall, and his attempts to recruit workers from the old quarry to come to Cwmorthin did not help the relationship.

The quarry was extended downwards, with five floors below the lake level. They finished building the inclines to serve them, started after the 1884 Cwmorthin fall, and used steam engines to power them and the pumps needs to keep the workings dry. In 1897, the company employed 290 people, of which 153 worked underground. However, the new company was soon in trouble. The long exit tramway pushed up the price of their finished slates, and by 1896, they were working as a co-operative. 10 per cent of the profits were shared amongst all workers who held £5 in shares, and a further 10 per cent was shared amongst those with £100 of shares. 77,367 tons of slates were produced under New Welsh Slate Company ownership, but debts gradually rose, and in 1900 the quarry was put up for auction, with a reserve price of £12,000. The peak demand for slate had passed and with the industry descending into recession, it did not reach its reserve. The company went into voluntary liquidation, and was wound up in 1902.

=== Oakeley ownership ===
The Oakeley Company had been concerned about the condition of the western end of their mine since 1889, as many of the pillars left between the chambers by the Cwmorthin workings were thinner than normal practice, and they feared another collapse, with the additional risk that the water from Llyn Cwmorthin might enter the workings, causing widespread flooding. In order to safeguard themselves, they bought the Cwmorthin operation for £10,000, with little intention of working it. The Lake Mill was demolished, and the others were shut up. In 1902 Oakeley stripped Cwmorthin of its machinery and allowed the workings to flood, despite the advice of its own consulting engineer. A connecting link was made between the two quarries on floor C in the South Vein. Water then drained into Oakeley's Middle Quarry. The workings in the North Vein flooded up to Lake level, and could no longer be inspected.

After the First World War, Oakeley explored re-opening Cwmorthin. While the mine had been officially closed for over 20 years, local men had continued to remove slate from the upper workings, and an inspection in the 1920s revealed that much of this part of the mine had been wrecked by rock falls and was completely unsafe. The next plan was to remove the overburden covering the South Vein, so that the pillars could be quarried. In 1925 they renewed the tramway connecting the Ffestiniog Railway to the mill, and restored the surface inclines and the lower mills. A new magazine was built, but as the rock was removed, it became evident that there was little usable slate left. The un-flooded underground levels were then investigated, and productive rock was found. Part of the South Vein incline and its connecting tramways was restored, and a previously unworked section of the North Vein was accessed by driving a new level to it.

Although there were supplies of good rock, work in Cwmorthin was hampered by the costs of transporting the finished slates, and by the lack of power. The Oakeley Quarries were powered by electricity and compressed air, and a plan to drain the flooded North Vein workings was drawn up in 1932, which would allow power supplies to be brought through from the Oakeley side. The Oakeley workings were by then underneath the lower Cwmorthin chambers, and so Cwmorthin could be drained in a controlled fashion. Surface work at Cwmorthin, which had stopped in 1932, resumed. The North Sink incline was electrified, and air compressors were installed. A new incline was constructed, descending below Cwmorthin's floor E, and one of the Oakeley inclines was extended to assist the extraction of quarried rock.

During the Second World War the quarry was mothballed, with only the pumps kept running to prevent flooding. Afterwards, there was another attempt to remove the overburden from the upper workings, using earth moving machinery, but this was again unsuccessful. During the 1960s the machinery, where it was still accessible, was removed. In 1970 the main Oakeley Quarries closed, and Cwmorthin was sold off separately. Some local men worked it on a small scale, initially clearing the tunnels and getting rock from some of the falls. They installed a saw in one of the chambers, and used a Land Rover stripped down to its frame and engine for transport. Some outside capital enabled a mill to be rebuilt in the 1980s, but the scheme failed. A local company reopened the mine in 1995, but all work ceased in 1997.

=== Post-closure ===
In 2023, a hotel called Deep Sleep was opened within the mine, 1,375 feet (419 m) below ground level.

== Bibliography ==
- Boyd, James I.C. (1975). The Festiniog Railway 1800 - 1974; Vol. 2 - Locomotives and Rolling Stock; Quarries and Branches: Rebirth 1954-74. Blandford: Oakwood Press. ISBN 978-0-85361-168-4.
- Isherwood, Graham (1982). Cwmorthin Slate Quarry. Dolgellau: Merioneth Field Study Press.
- Richards, Alun John (1999). The Slate Regions of North and Mid Wales. Llanrwst: Gwasg Carreg Gwalch. ISBN 978-0-86381-552-2.
