= Tanygrisiau =

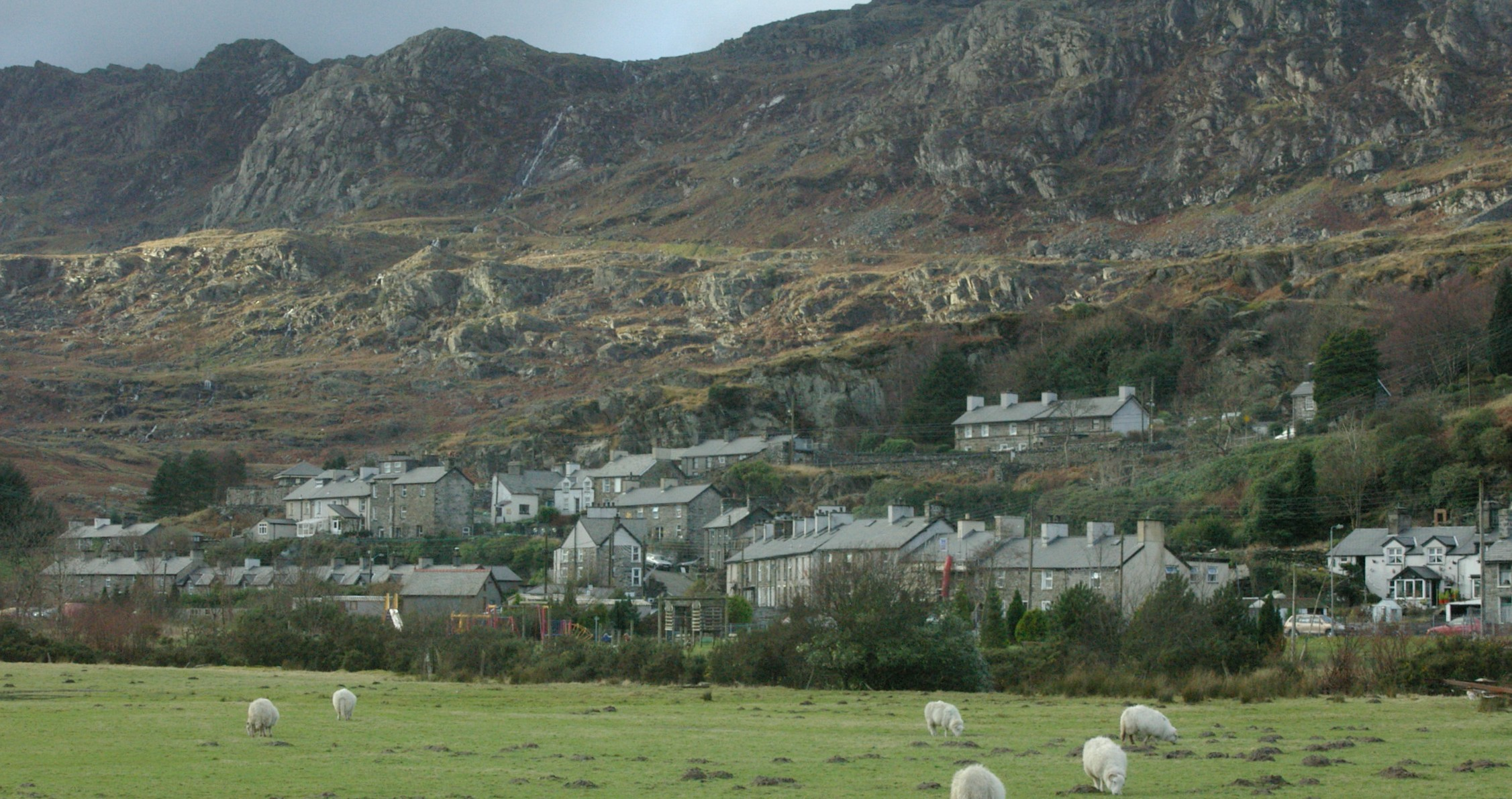
- Tanygrisiau, with the Moelwynion behind

- Location within Gwynedd
- Population: 349
- OS grid reference: SH687450
- Community: Ffestiniog
- Principal area: Gwynedd
- Preserved county: Gwynedd
- Country: Wales
- Sovereign state: United Kingdom
- Post town: BLAENAU FFESTINIOG
- Postcode district: LL41
- Dialling code: 01766
- Police: North Wales
- Fire: North Wales
- Ambulance: Welsh
- UK Parliament: Dwyfor Meirionnydd
- Senedd Cymru – Welsh Parliament: Dwyfor Meirionnydd

Tanygrisiau is a village and area within Blaenau Ffestiniog in the upper end of the Vale of Ffestiniog in the county of Gwynedd, north-west Wales (52°59′12″N 3°57′25″W). It can be found along the southern side of the Moelwyn mountain range and dates to around 1750. It joins onto the semi-urban area of Blaenau Ffestiniog, and is in the community of Ffestiniog; located between 650 feet (200 m) and 750 feet (230 m) above sea level. it is in the electoral ward of Bowydd and Rhiw which had a 2011 census population of 1878. The village itself has a population of around 350.

== Geography ==
The Moelwyns protect the village from much of the wind from northerly gales in the winter and give the village a pleasant southerly aspect with relatively mild weather considering its location high in Snowdonia. However, rainfall at the upper end of the Ffestiniog valley can be very high all year around.

== Industrial Past and Present ==
Tanygrisiau, or more properly 'Tan y grisiau', is Welsh for "below the steps", referring to the stepped cliffs above the village. Tanygrisiau was famous for its slate mining, producing a high quality black slate that was used across the world. The major quarries above the village were Cwmorthin, Wrysgan and Conglog.

Tanygrisiau railway station is on the Ffestiniog Railway, a narrow gauge railway built to carry slate from the mines down to the sea at Porthmadog where it was shipped all around the world, mostly for use in roofing.

The nearby Ffestiniog power station, the high Stwlan Dam and Llyn Ystradau, colloquially known as Tanygrisiau Reservoir, are part of a pumped storage hydroelectricity installation. Much nearer the railway station is a waterfall on the Afon Cwmorthin and below the falls, and powered by a different water source, is a very small hydro-electric power station.

The closure of the slate mines during the late 1970s led to massive depopulation of the area from which it has only recently (2005) begun to recover.

Tanygrisiau has close links with the regiment of the Royal Welch Fusiliers.

== Language ==
Welsh is the predominant language of the area and the medium of instruction in all local schools.

== Leisure ==
The village is a starting point for walks into the Moelwyns, especially if the intention is to climb Moelwyn itself. Care should be taken as there are numerous mine shafts in the area.

As a result of the slate mining, when the Snowdonia National Park was created, Tanygrisiau, Manod and Blaenau Ffestiniog were left outside, thus creating a doughnut-shaped area excluded from the National Park. Exclusion from the park was also intended to attract new industries to the area.

== Gallery ==
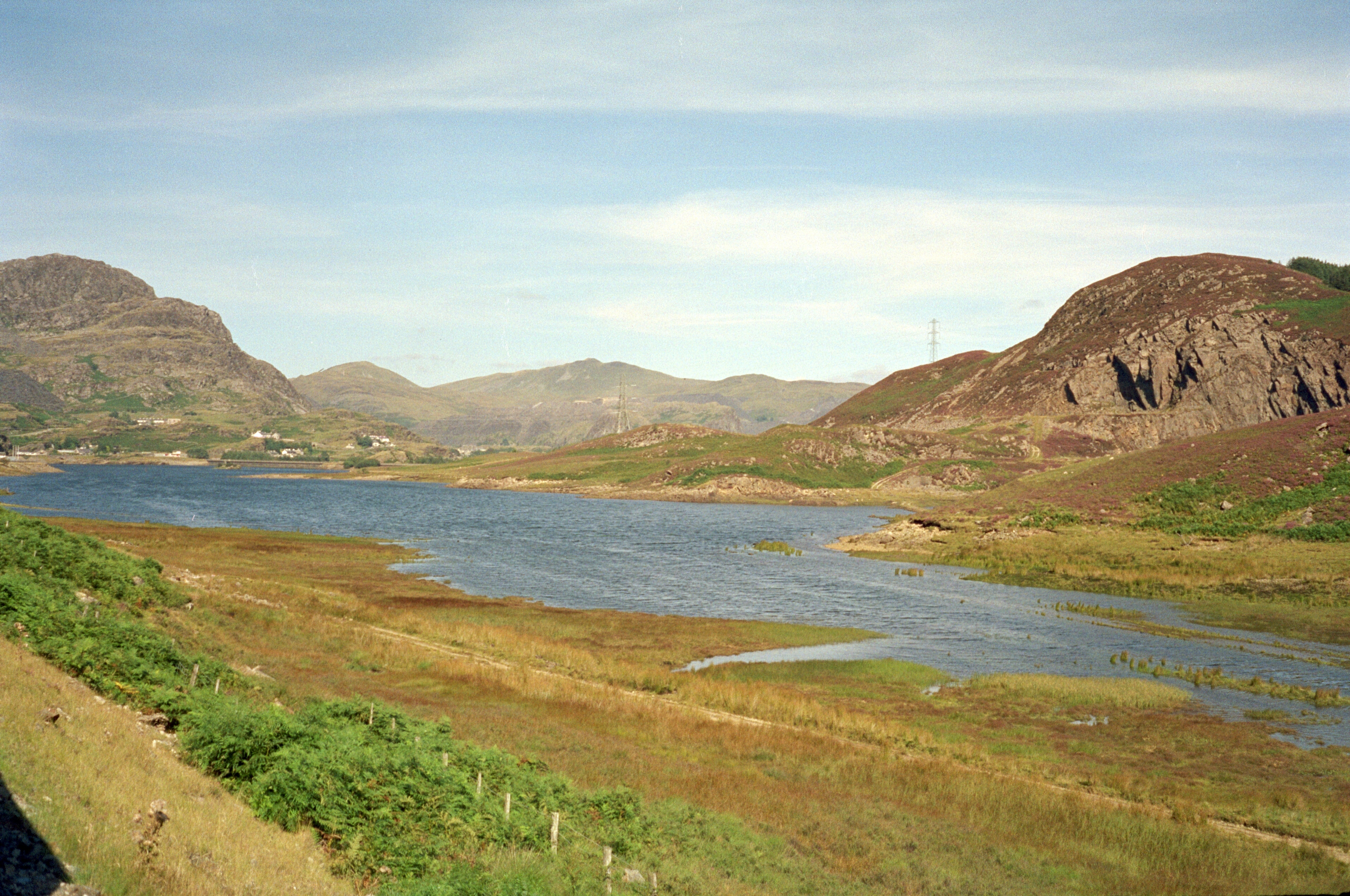
Llyn Ystradau, looking down towards the dam.

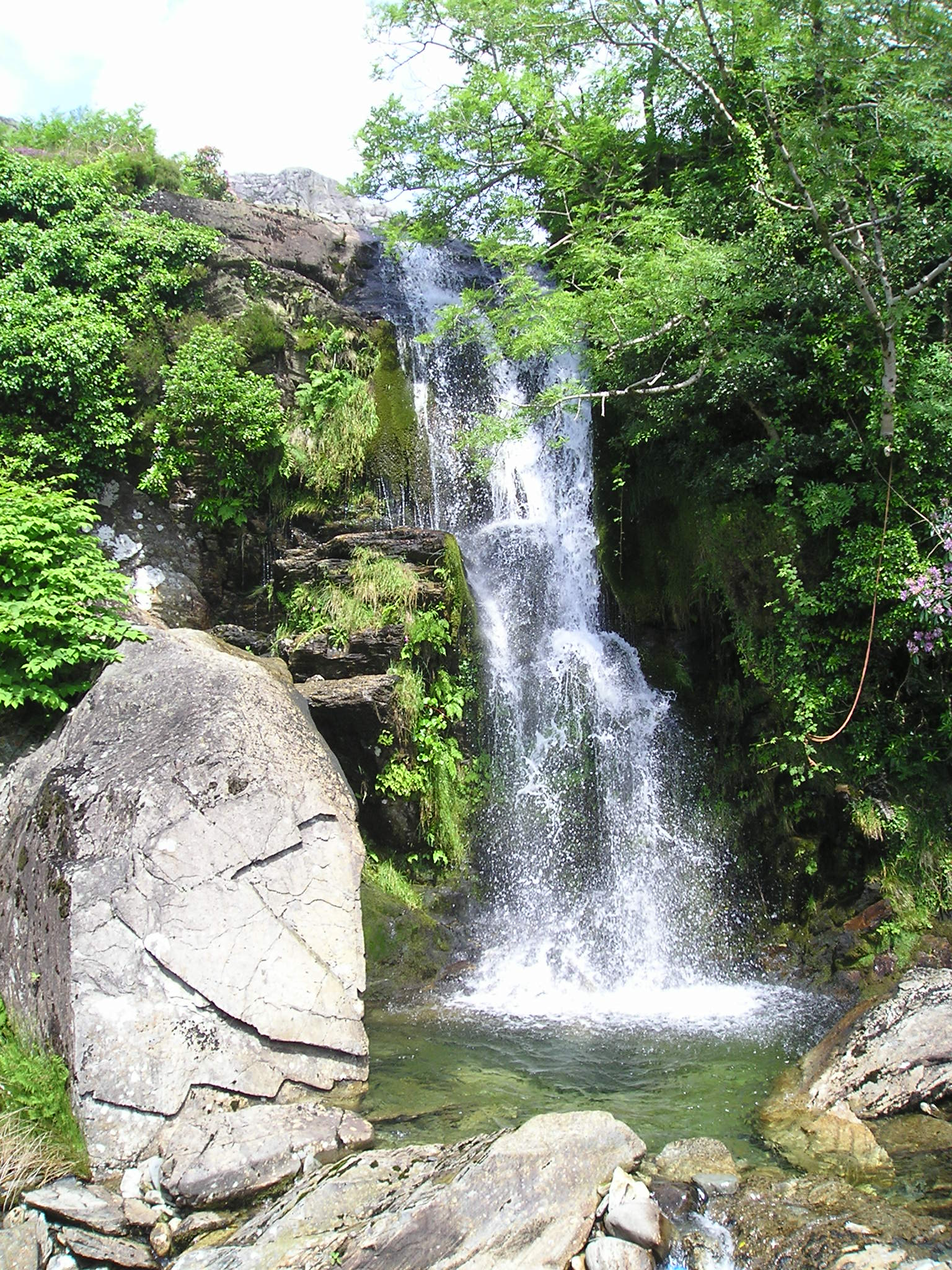
Cwmorthin Falls taken from the Porthmadog train leaving Tanygrisiau

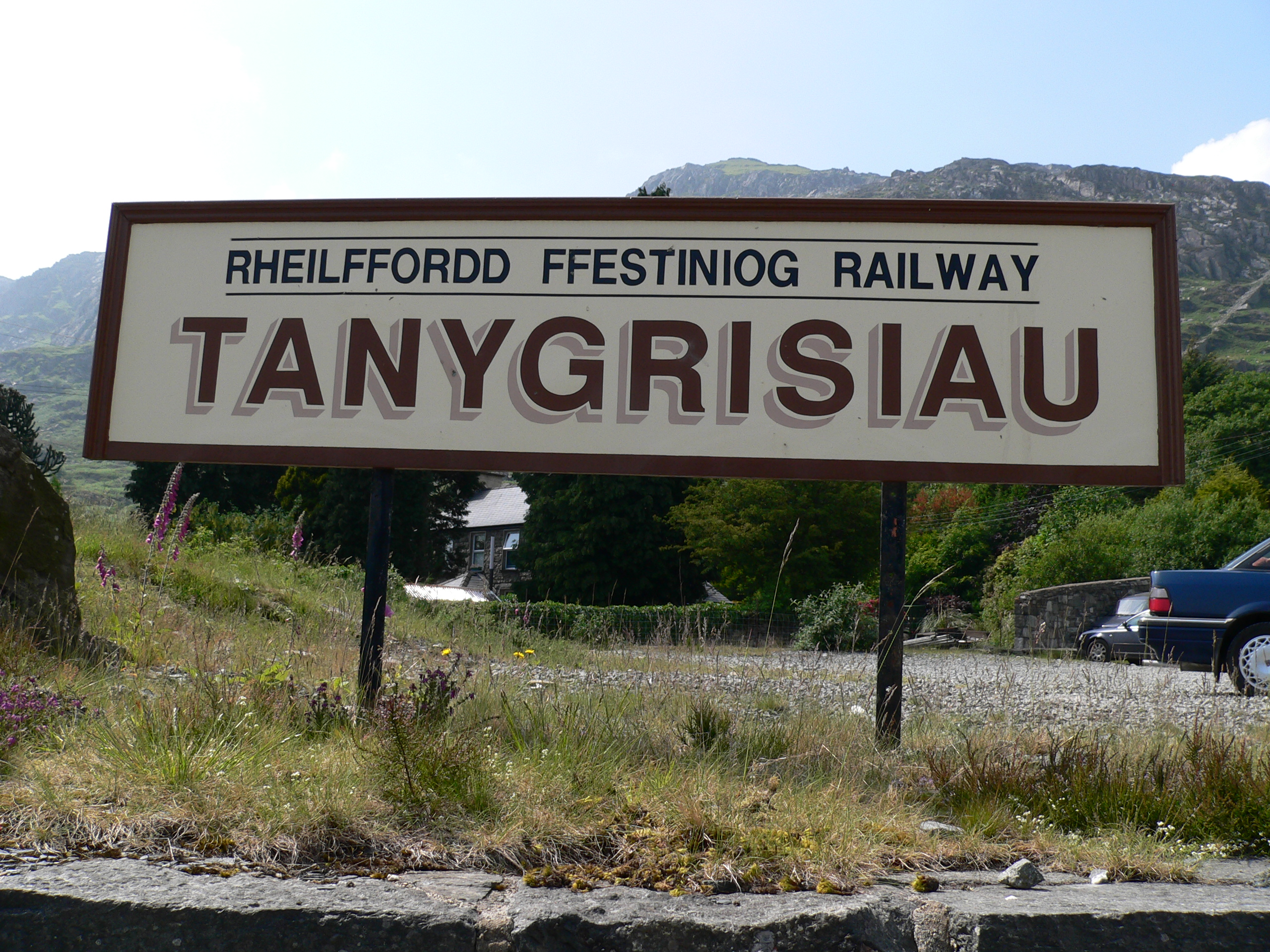
The sign at the car park for Tanygrisiau railway station

== Notable residents ==
- Gai Toms music artist

== Noted former residents ==
- Gwyn Thomas, Welsh poet, academic and the present National Poet for Wales, was born in Tanygrisiau in 1936. As a boy, his family then moved to the main town Blaenau Ffestiniog only a couple of miles away.
- Meredydd Evans (born Llanegryn, Wales 1919) was a collector, editor, historian and notable performer of folk music of Wales.
