= Moel Druman =

Mountain (676m) in Gwynedd, Wales

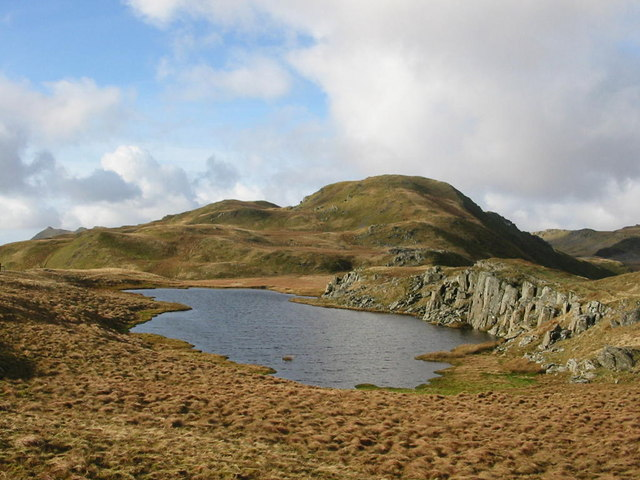
- Moel Druman from Allt Fawr col

Highest point
- Elevation: 676 m (2,218 ft)
- Prominence: 61 m (200 ft)
- Parent peak: Allt-fawr
- Listing: Hewitt, Nuttall
- Coordinates: 53°00′33″N 3°58′56″W

Geography
- Location within Wales
- Country: Wales
- County: Gwynedd
- Parent range: Snowdonia
- OS grid: SH671476
- Topo map: OS Landranger 115

Moel Druman is a mountain in Snowdonia, North Wales and forms part of the Moelwynion. It is a subsidiary summit of Allt-fawr.
