= Cnicht =

Mountain in Snowdonia, UK

Coordinates: 53°0′1.26″N 4°1′7.66″W

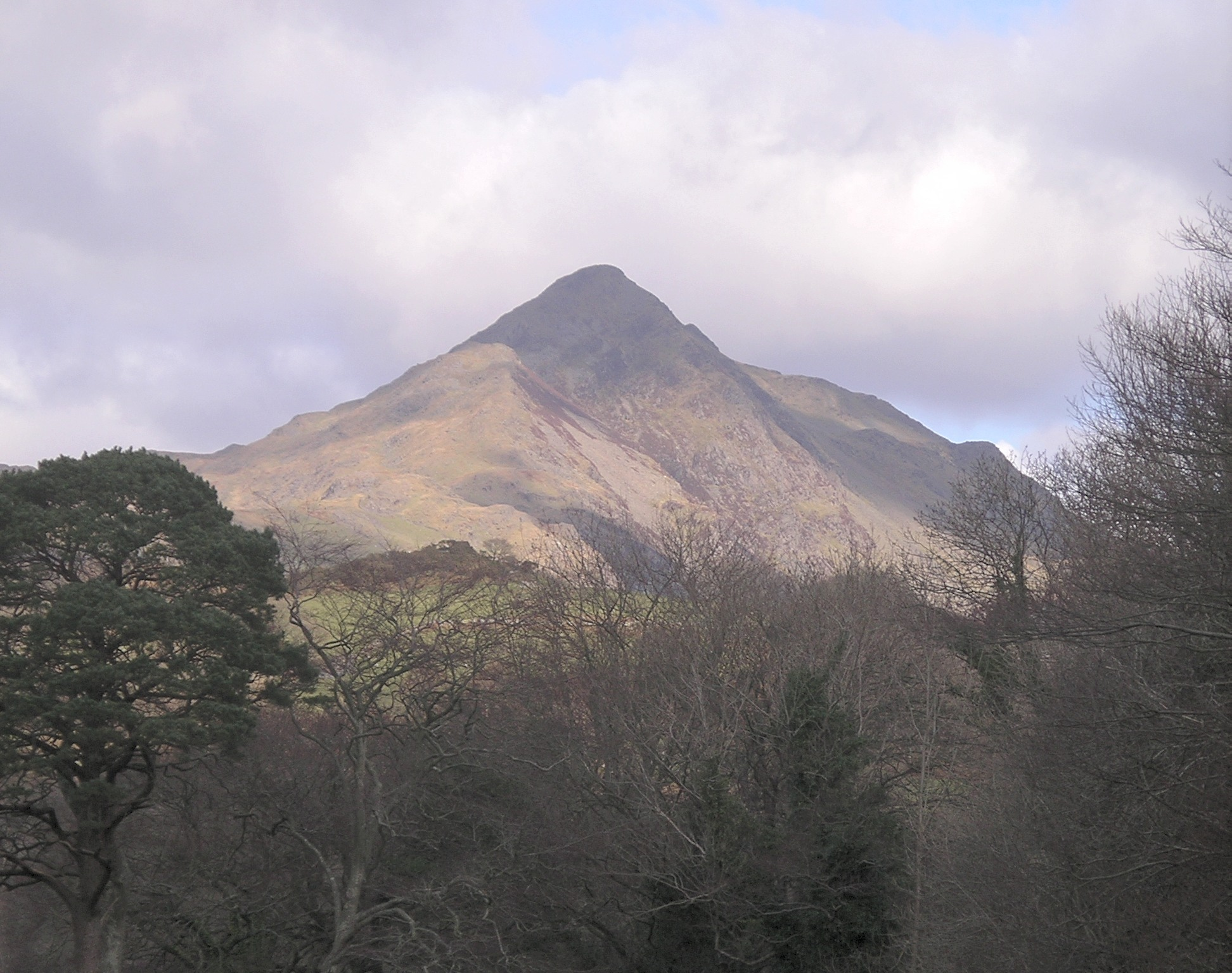
- Cnicht from the south-west

Highest point
- Elevation: 691 m (2,267 ft)
- Prominence: 105 m (344 ft)
- Listing: HuMP, Hewitt, Nuttall

Naming
- English translation: knight
- Language of name: Welsh
- Pronunciation: Welsh pronunciation: [ˈknɪχt]

Geography
- Location: Gwynedd, Wales
- Parent range: Moelwynion
- OS grid: SH645466
- Topo map: OS Landranger 115

Listed summits of Cnicht
Name	Grid ref	Height	Status
Cnicht North Top		690 m (2,260 ft)	Nuttall

Cnicht is a mountain in Snowdonia which forms part of the Moelwynion mountain range.

== Features ==
Its appearance when viewed from the south-west, i.e., from the direction of Porthmadog, has earned it the sobriquet the "Matterhorn of Wales", albeit being 3,787 metres lower. In reality, Cnicht is a long ridge and, at 691 m, is the fifth-highest peak in the Moelwynion mountain range. It can be easily ascended from Croesor, the village at its foot, or, with more difficulty, from Nant Gwynant to the northwest.

Although regarded by some as a mountain in its own right, Cnicht does not have the required 150m of topographic prominence to be classed as a Marilyn.

== Toponymy ==
The mountain's name is thought to derive from the English surname Knight, the name of a family who were formerly merchants in Caernarfon. When borrowed into Welsh, the consonants represented by ⟨K⟩ and ⟨gh⟩ were still pronounced in English, and these are retained in the Welsh name Cnicht as ⟨C⟩ (/k/) and ⟨ch⟩ (/χ/).

== In fiction ==
It appears as the "Saeth" in Patrick O'Brian's 1952 novel Three Bear Witness (published as Testimonies in the USA), which is set in a fictionalised version of Cwm Croesor. O'Brian and his wife lived in the valley between 1946 and 1949.
