= Parc quarry =

Disused slate mine in North Wales

Parc
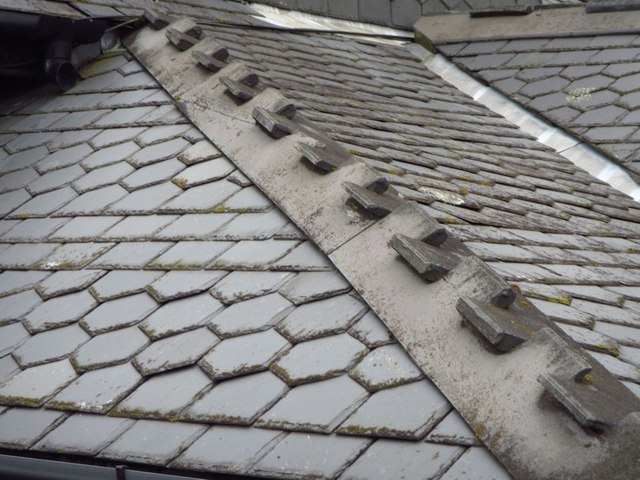
- Example of the interlocking slate ridging patented by Moses Kellow and produced at Parc (this example is on the former toll house at Porthmadog, which became the offices for the Croesor quarry).

- Location in Gwynedd
- Location: near Croesor, Gwynedd, Wales, UK; 52.9727°N 4.0462°W grid reference SH626436
- Products: Slate
- Type: Underground Quarry
- Opened: c.1870
- Closed: c.1920

Parc Quarry was a compact underground slate quarry in the Croesor Valley, Gwynedd, North Wales. It was connected to the Croesor Tramway, which ran through the valley. The quarry concentrated on producing specialist slate products, rather than roofing slates, and was managed for much of the time by the innovator Moses Kellow. It operated for about 50 years, from 1870 to 1920.

== History ==
The Croesor Valley is bleak and remote, even today, but in the 1860s the Croesor Tramway was constructed along it, to facilitate the transport of slate products from Rhosydd quarry and Croesor quarry at the head of the valley. The tramway was built without Parliamentary authority in two parts, a section from Porthmadog to a rocky outcrop at Carreg-Hylldrem, to the north-west of the hamlet of Llanfrothen, which was constructed by obtaining a series of Wayleaves, and a continuation eastwards, beginning with the two Parc inclines, which was effectively a private tramway, as it was built on land leased by various quarry owners. It opened for traffic on 1 August 1864, when the first four loaded wagons of slates from Rhosydd Quarry were conveyed to Porthmadog.

Parc, which was located to the east of the lower Parc incline, opened around 1870. It was also known as Ceunant Parc, to distinguish it from the Parc Slab Quarry, a little further up the valley, which was known as Garth Llwynog or Hen Dwll. There was an adit, from which chambers were developed, and the extracted slate was processed at a water-powered mill. The slate was not really suitable for the production of roofing slates, and so most of its early products were slate slabs. In 1883, there were 15 men working the quarry, and they produced 351 tons of finished slate. The quarry was connected to the Croesor Tramway at the foot of the Lower Parc incline. To reach that point, a tramway descended from the mill via a short incline, crossed the Afon Maesgwm by a bridge, and descended via a second incline to reach the junction. The Afon Maesgwm is a tributary of the Afon Croesor, which is itself a tributary of the Afon Glaslyn.

=== Moses Kellow ===
Moses Kellow, who was born on 5 June 1862 at Delabole, Cornwall, close to one of the largest slate quarries in Britain. His parents moved to Caernarfon some three years later, and besides his school education, his father trained him in engineering and geology. By the age of 20, around 1882, he was managing Parc. Slate in the Blaenau Ffestiniog region is generally found in veins which slope downwards at an acute angle from the horizontal, resulting in the quarries being underground once the initial surface rock has been removed. The veins are separated by layers of harder rock, often granite or chert, which are called "hards". The slate vein worked at Parc was about 121 feet (37 m) thick, and sloped downwards at about 42 degrees. Unusually, the pillaring line, one of the planes in which rock can be split, was almost horizontal rather than vertical, and the foot joints did not run in a suitable direction to detach slate blocks from the floor of a chamber. Additionally, the rock above the vein was not hard enough to support the roof of large chambers. Because of this, Kellow's father, William, decided in 1880 to work the quarry from the bottom upwards, rather than adopting the more normal practice of working from the top downwards.

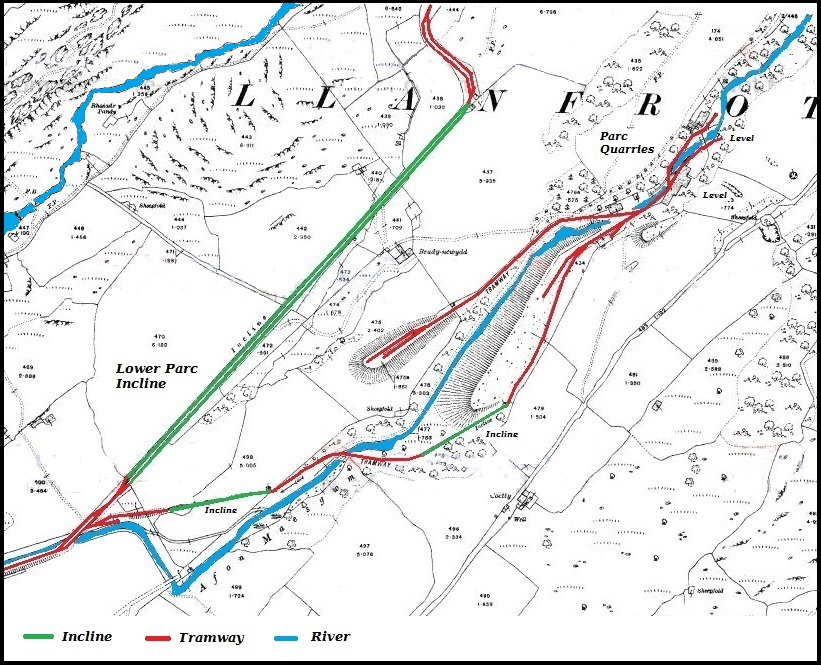
Map of the Parc quarry in 1915, showing tramways and rivers

In order to achieve this, an incline was driven downwards through the slate to the deepest level at which the quarry was likely to be worked. From that point, a tunnel was driven sideways, to give access to a series of chambers, which were worked by extracting rock from the roof of the chambers. The process was made easier by drilling along the pillaring line. As blocks were extracted, they fell onto the waste rock at the bottom of the chamber, and waste rock did not need to be removed to the surface, since if formed a platform from which the quarrymen could work. Because the chambers were filled with rubbish as they were developed, there was little danger of roof collapses or the failure of pillars between adjacent chambers, which had caused disaster in nearby Blaenau Ffestiniog, when over six million tons of rock had collapsed into the Oakeley quarry during the winter of 1882/83, fortunately without loss of life. Moses Kellow gave evidence to a Royal Commission on this method of working a quarry, and whether it was applicable to the quarries in Blaenau Ffestiniog.

Kellow was known as a "fearless innovator", who introduced new engineering solutions and working practices. The initial shaft at Parc was 14 feet (4.3 m) square, and descended through five galleries from the main adit to a depth of 225 feet (69 m). He tried using compressed air drills while it was being constructed, but did not think that they provided much advantage over hand drilling. However, once it was completed, compressed air was used to pump water from the bottom of the quarry, and to power winches, which were used to load the extracted blocks onto wagons for transport to the surface. The internal incline was powered by a Rigg hydraulic rotary engine, rated at 80 hp (60 kW). A 475-foot (145 m) head of water provided 206 pounds per square inch (1,420 kPa) at the shaft to drive the machine. He believed that with such a pressure, he should be able to operate a hydraulic injector to dewater the quarry, but none were on the market, and manufacturers in Britain and America were convinced that such an idea would not work without a supply of steam. He persisted, and found a continental manufacturer who was prepared to build a prototype. Once installed, it successfully raised water from the bottom of the shaft, and with no moving parts, did not need regular maintenance. The only control was a pressure valve, which was opened and closed to start and stop the pumping.

As a result of the unusual direction of the pillaring plane, the quarry yielded slate which was very long but quite narrow, and Kellow decided that it was suitable for slate ridging. He improved manufacturing methods, doubling the output per man, and supplied plain ridging extensively to Britain and the Continent. Where such ridging was not sufficiently decorative, he produced a three-part interlocking design, where the two interlocking sides were held together by a central decorative crest, before being cemented onto the ridge of a roof. A variety of patterns were available for the crest, but the extra cost of producing it meant that it was less widely used. The result of specialising on these products, marketed at Parcro, was that the quarry was relatively profitable.

The quarry was eventually worked on seven levels, four below the adit, one at adit level, and two above it. There were two mills associated with the quarry, both water powered, containing six saws, three dressers and three planers. In January 1892, Kellow married Nell Williams, the daughter of Thomas and Elizabeth Williams of Bryn, Croesor. Thomas had been the manager of Croesor quarry for many years, although it had not been in production since 1878. He died around 1895, and Kellow took over the management of Croesor. He saw it as a source of roofing slates to go with the ridging that Parc produced, and set about reopening it. The Parc and Croesor Quarries were amalgamated in early 1896.

=== Innovation ===
Kellow's talent for seeing issues and finding innovative solutions to them continued at Croesor, and two in particular benefitted the workforce at Parc. The first was a change in working practice. Traditionally, slate was extracted as bargains, which consisted of a group of four men, two rockmen who worked underground extracting the blocks of slate from a specific chamber, and two who worked on the surface processing the blocks to make the slate products. When development work was occurring underground, the surface workers would have nothing to do, and then when rock was being produced, the underground workers often could not work as fast as they would like due to a surplus of blocks awaiting processing. To Kellow's mind, the situation was made worse by the fact that while one group of surface workers was overwhelmed with blocks, another group might have nothing to do. He decided to split the link between rockmen and slate-makers, so that blocks arrived at the surface, and were then allocated to the slate-makers by ballot. There was initial resistance to such a change in working practice, but in the first month, output increased by 25 per cent, and the opposition melted away as the workers saw their wages increase significantly. The practice was implemented at Parc, and ultimately in a number of the major quarries in North Wales.

His next innovation was a hydraulic drill, powered by high-pressure water. A number of quarries were experimenting with compressed air percussive drills, but Kellow disliked them, because they were noisy, created clouds of dust, and were uncomfortable to the men who had to use them for long periods. His design of twist drill was attached to the rock by making two 2.5-inch (6.4 cm) holes, which acted as anchorages, and pressure of 2 to 3 tons was applied, which enabled a 7.5-foot (2.3 m) hole to be drilled in under two minutes. Previously, hand drilling of such a hole took around ten hours, and the new process created no dust. Kellow implemented another change in working practice, so that rockmen in a chamber would create the two small anchorage holes where they needed a hole to be drilled, and then call for the drilling team, probably one man and an assistant, who would set up the drill, drill the hole, and move on to the next chamber. The drilling team had an interest in maintaining the drill, and the rockmen could get on with blasting the rock and extracting blocks. Kellow refined the design of the drill over the years, and they were used extensively at Croesor and Parc, and found some use at Llechwedd quarry in Blaenau Ffestiniog, but Weaver has suggested that it failed to find wider markets because Kellow did not emphasise the changes in working practice which made it a success in his own quarries.

=== Demise ===
It is not clear exactly when the quarry ceased to be worked. Kellow states that it was worked from the bottom upwards for 33 years, which he says was the whole time that it was worked, and that production ceased midway through World War I, as there was no longer a market for the slate products which it produced. The details in his autobiography were dictated from memory around 1941, by which time he was almost blind. Richards states that the quarry closed in 1920.

== Remains ==
Apart from the drumhouses, most of the access tramway is no longer traceable. However, a number of the buildings associated with the quarry are in good condition, and some have been reused, including the office, which is unusually ornate and has become a house. The Afon Maesgwm which runs through the site has been bridged in several places by huge slate slabs, and is almost culverted.

== Geology ==
Slate is a metamorphic rock, formed when its constituents are subjected to extremes of temperature and pressure. The slates of southern Gwynedd and the Ffestiniog region are usually dark grey in colour, and are thought to have been formed in the Ordovician period. In this locality, slate is described as being in veins, consisting of a layer of rock that can be worked. Most of the veins in the Ffestiniog region dip downwards, and an angle of around 30 degrees, and as a consequence, any quarry soon has to develop underground chambers, as it is impracticable to remove the overlying rock. Slate can be extracted from the veins because it usually has three planes of fracture, the best known of which is the cleavage plane, which allows the rock to be split into thin sheets once the blocks have been removed from the chambers. It is this property, which allows roofing slates to be produced so easily, that results in it having commercial value. A second plane of fracture is the pillaring line, similar to the grain of a piece of timber, and this is often nearly vertical. The third plane consists of the foot-joints, which usually run across the plane of cleavage. Some veins do not have well-defined foot-joints, and in this case, rows of holes are drilled through the rock, which snaps when the pillaring line is blasted.

The slate quarried at Parc was of good quality, but did not neatly conform to this pattern. The vein dipped downwards at about 42 degrees, and was around 120 feet (37 m) thick. The cleavage plane also dipped downwards, at about 30 degrees, but on a somewhat different alignment to the direction of the vein. The pillaring plane was not vertical, but ran at an acute angle to both the vein and the cleavage plane. Finally the direction of the foot-joints was not conducive to extracting blocks of slate from the bottom of a chamber. It was these features that led Kellow to work the quarry from the bottom up, rather than the top down, and to produce slate slabs, rather than roofing slates.

== Description ==
Unlike the open quarries of the area, Parc Quarry was entirely underground deep within and into the rock underneath the Moelwyn mountains. Its location and design reflects onto the much precision miners required of 19th century Welsh slate mining standards, where space was limited and extraction required much precise angles.

== Bibliography ==
- Boyd, James (1972). Narrow Gauge Railways in South Caernarvonshire. Oakwood Press.
- Gwyn, David (2015). Welsh Slate. Royal Commission on the Ancient and Historical Monuments of Wales. ISBN 978-1-871184-51-8.
- Isherwood, J G (1977). Candles to Caplamps – The story of Gloddfa Ganol. Gloddfa Ganol.
- Kellow, Moses (2015). Woodhead, Cathy (ed.). The Autobiography of the Croesor Quarry Manager. Delfryn Publications. ISBN 978-0-9561469-9-1.
- Lindsay, Jean (1974). A History of the North Wales Slate Industry. David and Charles. ISBN 978-0-7153-6265-5.
- Richards, Alun John (1991). A Gazeteer of the Welsh Slate Industry. Gwasg Carreg Gwalch. ISBN 978-0-86381-196-8.
- Richards, Alun John (1999). The Slate Regions of North and Mid Wales. Gwasg Carreg Gwalch. ISBN 978-0-86381-552-2.
- Weaver, Rodney (August 1978). The Kellow Drill (PDF). Adit Now. Archived from the original (PDF) on 2 January 2017.
