= Hugh Beaver Roberts =

Welsh solicitor

Hugh Beaver Roberts (c. 1820 - 1903) was a solicitor, originally based in Bangor, Caernarfonshire who became an entrepreneur involved in the construction of narrow gauge railways and the ownership of slate quarries in North Wales during the second half of the 19th century.

== Personal life ==
Hugh Beaver Roberts was born in Cilcain, a village near Mold in Flintshire. He was the second son of Hugh Roberts, and received his education at Rugby School. He then moved to Bangor where he was a solicitor, working with John Hughes. Hughes died in 1849, and Roberts took over his legal practice, as well as succeeding his as Clerk to the Bangor Magistrates, Diocesan Registrar, Chapter CLerk and agent to the Bishop of Bangor. His marriage to Harriet Wyatt of Llandygai took place in June 1848, after which they lived at Bryn Menai in Bangor. They had five children, three sons and two daughters. They briefly moved to the Plas Madoc estate at Llanddoged near Llanrwst in 1858, but three years later were again living in Bangor at Wellfield House, near the centre of the town. By 1871, the couple, together with one of their sons and both of their daughters were living in Leamington Spa, although his occupation was still Registrar of the Court of Probate at Bangor, and the returns for Llanddoged still showed his residence as being in Bangor.

As well as his legal career, Roberts was involved in a number of railway and quarrying projects. His other activities included being a Justice of the Peace, District Registrar at the Court of Probate at Bangor, and Deputy Lieutenant for Merionethshire. He also served on the Board of Health for Bangor, and was the political agent during the unsuccessful Parliamentary election campaign for George Sholto Douglas-Pennant in 1868. By 1881 he was living in London, and subsequently lived at various addresses within the city. Harriett died in the mid to late 1890s, while Roberts died on 17 June 1903. Despite his wide-ranging career, his estate amounted to just £471 15s 3d (£471.76). His middle son, Charles Warren Roberts, became a railway engineer and also managed Llechwedd quarry in Blaenau Ffestiniog, while his third son, Arthur Llewellyn Wynne Roberts was secretary of the Royal Literary Fund for thirty years.

== Professional life ==
In the late 1830s or early 1840s, a tramway had been built from an ironstone mine at Llidiart Yspytty, to the west of Porthmadog to the quays on the western bank of the Afon Glaslyn. When the fortunes of the mine declined, and the Bangor and Portmadoc Slate and Slate Slab Co Ltd wanted to extend the line northwards to Gorseddau slate quarry, Roberts was the solicitor who drew up the draft plan. He was living at Plas Llandoget, Llanrwst at the time, and although the scheme fell through, a tramway was built to Gorseddau some two years later in 1855. The tramway was built on private land and therefore no parliamentary authority was obtained for its construction, but some of the land was leased from John Priestley of Ty-uchaf-cwmystadllyn, and it was Roberts who drew up the lease.

Roberts was involved in the Croesor Tramway to a much greater extent than the Gorseddau Tramway. It was constructed in two parts, with the lower section from Porthmadog to Carreg-Hylldrem being authorised by an act of Parliament, the Croesor and Portmadoc Railway Act 1865 (28 & 29 Vict. c. ccxcv), obtained on 5 July 1865. This was officially the Croesor and Portmadoc Railway, and Roberts was one of the directors. The upper section, from Carreg-Hylldrem up the Croesor Valley, was built on land owned by Roberts. The lower section was constructed using a series of wayleaves and was virtually flat, with the only major civil engineering work being a bridge to cross the Afon Glaslyn. It ran for some 4 miles (6.4 km) to Carreg-Hylldrem, a rocky outcrop near Llanfrothen. The act of Parliament was obtained afterwards, to authorise maintenance of the tramway and an extension to Borth y Gest, which was never built. The upper section was privately funded by Roberts, and again used wayleaves, as he owned most of the land himself. From the end of Cwm Croesor, the tramway was relatively level for 0.25 miles (0.40 km) and then descended 150 feet (46 m) at the Blaen y Cwm incline. There was then another fairly flat 1.5-mile (2.4 km) section, which required three clapper bridges to be constructed, before the village of Croesor is reached. It continues for another 0.5 miles (0.80 km) with a stone embankment used to maintain the grade to the head of the Parc incline, two sections which together dropped the line by nearly 500 feet (150 m).

Croesor quarry built its own incline to connect to the top end of the tramway, as did Rhosydd quarry. Both descended by around 750 feet (230 m) and were the two highest single-pitch inclines in Wales. Rhosydd quarry were able to build their incline because Roberts granted them a wayleave in a deed of mutual covenant, which was signed on 1 October 1863, and lasted until 25 March 1906. The agreement was based on Rhosydd paying Roberts two pence per ton, which was reduced to one penny per ton. Subsequently, the tramway below Carreg-Hylldrem was owned by various companies, but ownership of the inclines and the track within Cwm Croesor was retained by Roberts. His ownership of the Croesor estate allowed him to build the village of Croesor in the mid-1860s, to provide housing for workers in the quarries. It includes a chapel, a school and a number of houses, which were more substantial than many dwellings of the time. They were built with large coursed stones obtained from the local quarries, and consisted of short terraces, with large windows. The estate included Croesor Fawr farm, and in 1866 Roberts granted a lease to the Croesor United Slate Co Ltd to search for slate on the farm.

From 1870 onwards, Roberts tried on several occasions to interest the Ffestiniog Railway in taking over the Croesor and Portmadoc Railway. This would have allowed locomotives to run as far as Carreg-Hylldrem, but the Ffestiniog Board stated in 1870 that they would not buy, operate, or amalgamate with the company unless the condition of its track was improved.

Roberts had more success negotiating with Charles Easton Spooner, the engineer for the Ffestiniog Railway. Spooner had plans for a network of narrow gauge lines in North Wales, which would make it difficult for the standard gauge railway companies to construct lines in the region. This was his North Wales Narrow Gauge Railways general undertaking. Roberts was involved in this larger scheme, but also managed to get a line from New Braich quarry to Dinas Junction, with a branch to Rhyd Ddu included in the plan. He owned New Braich quarry at Moel Tryfan, Dinas Junction would provide a transhipment point where slates could be loaded onto the London and North Western Railway, and the southern branch to Rhyd Ddu would tap into quarries in the Waunfawr area, and probably stimulate further growth along the valley.

When a draft bill was put before Parliament in April 1872, there were eight railways listed in it, but five of these were rejected by the select committee. Two of the remaining lines were those proposed by Roberts, the Dinas to Moel Tryfan line, and the southern branch to Rhyd Ddu. The third would have linked the Croesor and Portmadoc Railway to Beddgelert, Pen-y-Gwryd, Capel Curig and Betws-y-Coed. Roberts was listed on the bill as both a major subscriber and one of the seven directors. The North Wales Narrow Gauge Railways Act 1872 (35 & 36 Vict. c. clxxv) was granted on 6 August 1872, and a second act of Parliament, the North Wales Narrow Gauge Railways (Lease) Act 1873 (36 & 37 Vict. c. lxxii), was obtained on 16 June 1873, to authorise modifications to the lease agreement between the company and Roberts. The fact that Roberts agreed to the lease has perplexed modern railway historians, because it appears to be particularly onerous. Under the terms of the lease, Roberts was required to spend £10,000 on buying locomotives and rolling stock, and was to maintain them for 21 years, so that they would retain their full value. All locomotives were to be Fairlie's Patent machines, and all stock would revert to the company after 21 years, although they would need to make a payment to Roberts if their value exceeded the purchase price at that time.

The construction of the Moel Tryfan line was awarded to Hugh Unsworth McKie, but Spooner failed to oversee the work sufficiently, and McKie lacked the financial resources required for such a project. The date for completion was November 1874, and McKie abandoned the project in that month, with much work still to be completed. With the deadline missed, Roberts knew that there was no way that the terms of his lease could be enforced, and walked away from it. Another contractor completed the Moel Tryfan line and the southern branch as far as Llyn Cwellyn by May 1877, using a locomotive hired from the Ffestiniog Railway and possibly a second hired from Roberts' Braich quarry. Locomotives and rolling stock were purchased by a London-based financier called J. C. Russell, who may have had some connection with Roberts, and the company ran with Russell as the receiver and chairman from 1879.

== Bibliography ==
- Boyd, J I C (1972). Narrow Gauge Railways in South Caernarvonshire. Oakwood Press. ISBN 978-0-85361-115-8. OCLC 636874685.
- Boyd, J I C (1975a). The Festiniog Railway; Vol. 1 - History and Route. Oakwood Press. ISBN 978-0-85361-167-7. OCLC 2074549.
- Boyd, J I C (1975b). The Festiniog Railway 1800 - 1974; Vol. 2 - Locomotives and Rolling Stock; Quarries and Branches: Rebirth 1954-74. Oakwood Press. ISBN 978-0-85361-168-4. OCLC 874117875.
- Jones, Gwynfor Pierce; Richards, Alun John (2004). Cwm Gwyrfai - The quarries of the North Wales Narrow Gauge and the Welsh Highland Railway. Carreg Gwalch. ISBN 978-0-86381-897-4.
- Richards, Alun John (2001). The Slate Railways of Wales. Carreg Gwalch. ISBN 978-0-86381-689-5.
- Southern, Dave; Barrell, Adrian (2018). The Croesor Tramway. Welsh Highland Railway Heritage Group. ISBN 978-0-9930821-6-0.
