= Moelwyn Quarry =

Defunct slate quarry in Wales

Meolwyn
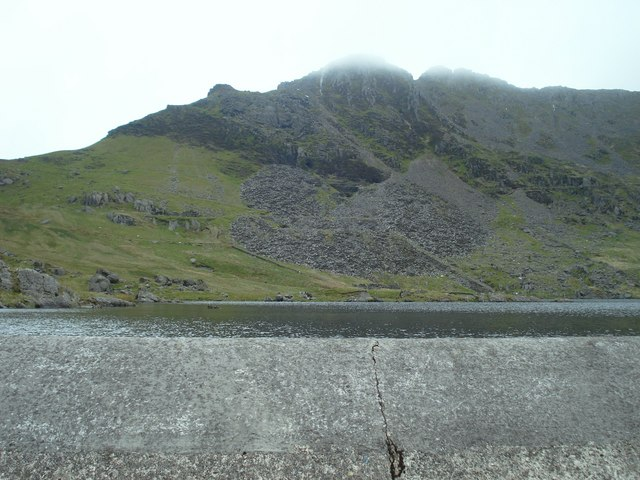
- The Moelwyn quarry, viewed from across Llyn Stwlan

- Location in Gwynedd
- Location: near Blaenau Ffestiniog, Gwynedd, Wales; 52°58′28.4″N 3°58′22.9″W grid reference SH6753143767
- Products: Slate
- Type: Quarry
- Opened: 1846

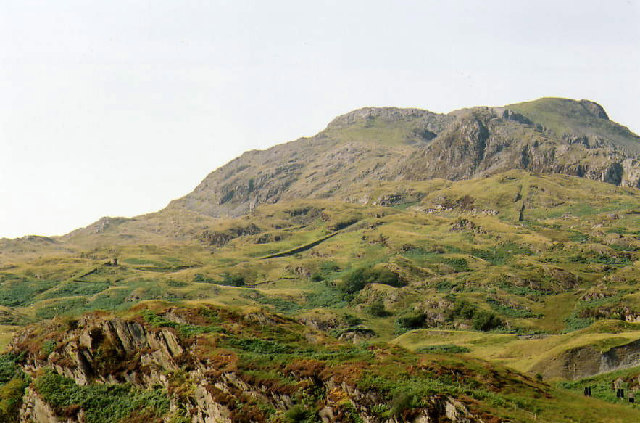
The eastern slope of Moelwyn Bach showing the inclines to the Moelwyn Slate Quarry

Moelwyn Quarry is a defunct slate quarry located to the south of the village of Tanygrisiau, north Wales. Some initial prospecting was carried out in the 1820s and again in the 1840s, but it was 1860 before a company was formed, and chambers were excavated. The quarry was never a financial success, and operated sporadically until its demise in 1897. Despite the poor results, a spectacular series of seven inclines were constructed, to enable slates to reach the Ffestiniog Railway. The quarry was hampered by lack of a good water supply, and the mill was constructed between inclines 4 and 5, where water could be obtained from Llyn Stwlan. As in many quarries, barracks were provided, but these were occupied by whole families, living on the mountain, rather than used as lodgings for the quarrymen during the working week. Even in its remote location, there was still a concern for education, with basic literacy classes being run in the 1860s.

== History ==
Between 1826 and 1828 the Rothschild's Royal Cambrian Company attempted to locate commercially viable slate deposits on land belonging to the Crown, on the eastern slopes of Moelwyn Bach. Considerable effort was expended, as Nathan Meyer Rothschild employed John Rogers from Wrexham to construct a cart road, which wound its way up the side of the valley to reach the quarry. It was known as Ffordd yr luddew mawr ('road of the great Jew'), and was extended around the western flanks of Moelwyn Mawr in the 1850s to reach Pant Mawr quarry. Several small-scale trial levels were cut, but none proved profitable, and Rothschild withdrew in 1828. Attention then switched to the southern flanks of Moelwyn Mawr, where a lawyer from Ruthin called Humprhey Jones had opened a quarry by 1841, but activity at the site was very intermittent.

The next major advance was in 1860, when the Great Moelwyn Slate Company Ltd. was founded and paid £9,890 to buy the quarry from Thomas Cooper Smith. Chambers were excavated underground, but as there was no reliable source of water to provide power, the mill was built at some distance from the workings, and at a lower level, so that a 40-by-4-foot (12.2 by 1.2 m) waterwheel could be fed from Llyn Stwlan. This drove six sawing tables and seven dressing machines. Three barrack buildings were erected, and whereas at most quarries, these were provided for the workers, at Moelwyn they were occupied by whole families, who lived there, rather than lodged there during the working week. The children had to make an arduous trek along the cart road to Tanygrisiau to attend school. The slate quarries were known as places of learning and culture, with barracks at many quarries including reading rooms or libraries, which were regularly updated with Welsh language newspapers and magazines produced by the non-conformist denominational churches. Even in its remote location, Moelwyn was no exception, as basic literacy classes were taking place there in the 1860s when it was visited by Lord Palmerston.

This period was also one of technological development, as Moelwyn was one of the first two quarries known to have used a water turbine, which was installed in 1864. The other was Ratgoed quarry, further south near Aberllefenni and served by the Corris Railway, which also installed a turbine in the same year. They did not become commonplace in the quarries until they were used to drive electrical generators, in the late 1890s and early 1900s. The Great Moelwyn Slate Company Ltd was reconstituted in 1865, with a working capital of £50,000, and had five directors, four from London and one from Oxford. James Wright, also from London, was employed as engineer, and by 1866, the transport of slates by pack horse had been superseded by a spectacular series of seven inclines to descend some 1,100 feet (340 m) to reach the Ffestiniog Railway close to the northern end of the Moelwyn Tunnel. The quarry leased an area of 356 acres (144 ha), and the mill buildings were located between the fourth and fifth inclines.

The quarry was never a significant success. It was closed by 1869 according to J W Greaves, when he was giving evidence to a House of Commons enquiry for a Ffestiniog Railway bill. The lease and quarry plant were put up for auction in 1870, but failed to reach their reserve price, and so were re-auctioned in 1871. The plant was sold separately, and the lease was bought by Messrs Pemberton, Flavell and Allison, all from Birmingham, for £17,000. The sellers were listed as Messrs Clear and Cheffins from London, and James Wright, the engineer since 1865. In 1873, the lease was sold on to the Union Slate Co. Ltd., a company formed to operate the quarry with a working capital of £40,000. They employed Mr Arthur Wade to re-instate the tramways and machinery, and William Popham David was appointed as manager. 45 men were at work in 1874, but the project was short-lived, as the company was liquidated in 1875, and finally wound up in 1881.

Again, the assets of the quarry were put up for auction, and the list included

- A tramway laid on inclines and levels, about 2,100 yards (1,900 m) long, with double track on the inclines and first four levels, and single track on the rest
- 4 drums 6 by 11.75 feet (1.83 by 3.58 m) and 2 drums 5 by 11.75 feet (1.52 by 3.58 m) fitted with wire ropes and other equipment, including about 250 iron rollers
- Machine sheds including 6 saw tables and 7 dressing machines
- A powder magazine
- A 40 by 4 feet (12.2 by 1.2 m) breast-shot water wheel, with a conduit from the lake to supply it
- A fully fitted out Carpenter's shop and Blacksmith's shop
- 1 Patent saw-sharpener, 4 crowbars, 18 rock drills and 1 grindstone
- 2 wheelbarrows, 6 lamps and 2 weighing machines

The final phase was from 1891 to 1897, when the quarry was run by J Solomon Jones, and traded as the Moelwyn Slate Company. There are few details of the amount of slate produced by the quarry, and the Department of Mines only has one set of annual returns for the entire life of the quarry. Large scale Ordnance Survey maps of the area were published in 1889 and 1901, but both correspond to periods when the quarry was not in production, and so although the formation of the main tramway and inclines can be seen, and the location of the mill and its water wheel is evident, few other details can be gleaned from this source.

In 1886 there was another attempt to work the vein even further down, when the Fron-Boeth quarry was opened. It was a continuation of the Pant-Mawr workings at a lower level, and the mill level was designated level 22, numbering downwards from level 1 at the top of Moelwyn.

== The site today ==
The quarry and the inclines remain largely intact, though Llyn Stwlan, which was extended in 1960 to become the upper reservoir in the Ffestiniog Power Station pumped-storage hydroelectricity scheme, sits just below the quarry and has obliterated the sixth incline, parts of the seventh, and much of the mill area. The Ffestiniog Railway's deviation around Llyn Ystradau, which is at a higher level to the original alignment, has also destroyed the lower section of the first incline. There are several adits accessible on the mountainside, but all have been fitted with metal grills to prevent entry.

== Connections with other mines ==
The vein which Moelwyn worked continued dipping to the west, and the Pant-Mawr quarry worked it lower down. In order to prevent the collapse of the Moelwyn workings, the Pant-Mawr chambers were located beneath Moelwyn chambers, and there were some connections between the two quarries to ensure that this was the case. In addition, the Pant-Mawr chambers were numbered sequentially with those of the Moelwyn Quarry. Finished slates were initially transported to the Ffestiniog Railway at Penrhyndeudraeth by pack animals, using Moelwyn's traditional route, but subsequently, two inclines were built to connect to the Croesor Tramway.

== Bibliography ==
- Boyd, James I.C. (1975). The Festiniog Railway (Volume 2). Oakwood Press.
- Gwyn, David (2015). Welsh Slate. Royal Commission on the Ancient and Historical Monuments of Wales. ISBN 978-1-871184-51-8.
- Lindsay, Jean (1974). A History of the North Wales Slate Industry. David and Charles. ISBN 978-0-7153-6265-5.
- Richards, Alun John (1999). The Slate Regions of North and Mid Wales. Gwasg Carreg Gwalch. ISBN 978-0-86381-552-2.
