= Fron-Boeth and Pant Mawr quarries =

Two quarries in north Wales

Fron-Boeth and Pant Mawr
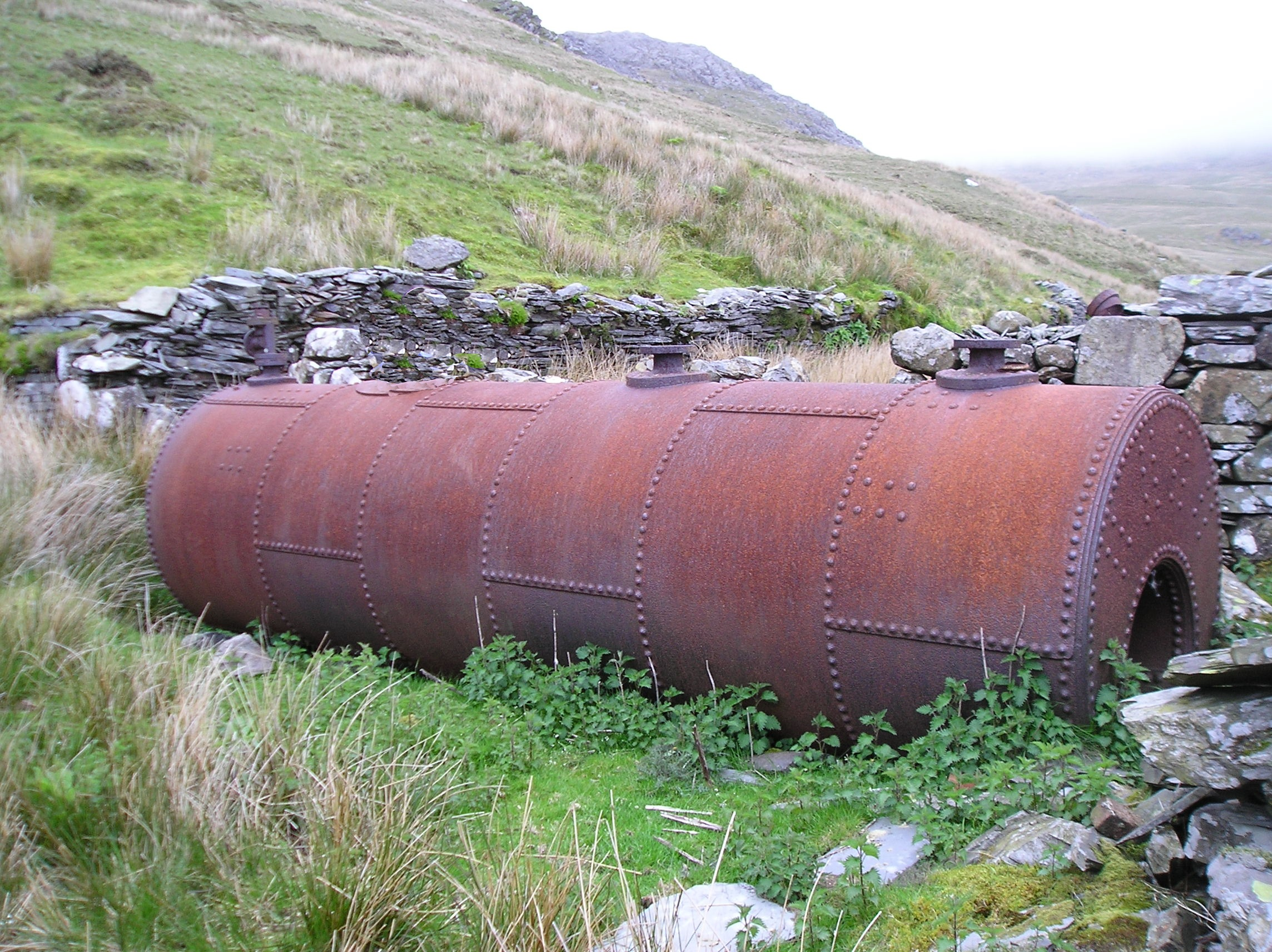
- An old Lancashire boiler next to the mill at Fron-Boeth

- Location in Gwynedd
- Location: near Croesor, Gwynedd, Wales, UK; Fron-Boeth: 52°59′0.1″N 4°1′6.9″W (grid reference SH6450044831) Pant-Mawr: 52°58′58.1″N 4°0′19.8″W (grid reference SH6537744745)
- Products: Slate
- Type: Quarry
- Opened: c.1850 (Pant Mawr); 1886 (Fron-Boeth)
- Active: c.1850-1879(Pant-Mawr only); 1886-1914(Both quarries)
- Closed: 1914

Fron-Boeth and Pant Mawr quarries were two closely related and interconnected quarries on the western slopes of Moelwyn Mawr in Gwynedd (formerly Caernarfonshire), North Wales. Pant Mawr operated from around 1850 to 1879, and was partly re-opened in 1886 when it was amalgamated with Fron-Boeth. Both quarries closed during the First World War. Finished product was transported to the slate quays of Porthmadog by the Croesor Tramway.

== History ==
=== Pant Mawr ===
Pant Mawr was the first of the two quarries to be established, around 1850. It was situated on the western slopes of Moelwyn Mawr, and was working the same slate vein as the Moelwyn quarry, which was situated on the south eastern slopes of the same mountain. Slate quarries in the Ffestiniog region, where the slate veins slope downwards at an angle, are worked as pillars and chambers, where two chambers on the same horizontal level are separated by a pillar of unquarried rock, of a similar thickness to the width of the chamber, in order to support the rock above. In order to maintain the stability of the quarry, chambers below that level are precisely aligned, so that the pillars on one floor are directly below those on the floor above. The upper levels of Moelwyn Quarry were at 1,700 feet (520 m) above ordnance datum (AOD), while Pant Mawr was around 1,500 feet (460 m) AOD. The integrity of the Moelwyn Quarry was ensured by making underground connections to it, and aligning the Pant Mawr chambers and pillars with those of the quarry above. The numbering sequence for the levels in the Moelwyn Quarry was continued downwards through the Pant Mawr Quarry.

When first opened, there was no railway connection to the Croesor valley, and slates were transported to the Ffestiniog Railway at Penrhyndeudraeth by pack animals, using a route along Cwm Maesgwyn, which was also used by the Moelwyn quarry. Later in the 1850s, the quarry erected a small mill, and constructed an incline to transport the quarried rock to it. The next big advance took place in 1863, when a second incline was built to connect to the mill, and an access tramway was constructed to link with the Croesor Tramway, then being built by Hugh Beaver Roberts. The access tramway was built on a rock-cut shelf, partly following an old track, and then descended 1,000 feet (300 m) via two inclines, making it the highest two-pitch incline in the slate quarrying industry of Britain.

The mill was upgraded in 1878 by the addition of a steam engine, and there were around 100 men working in the quarry at the time. However, work ceased in the following year, and the quarry was idle until 1886, when it was amalgamated with Fron-Boeth. Some of the chambers were worked subsequently, and four men were still working two or three chambers in 1905.

=== Fron-Boeth ===
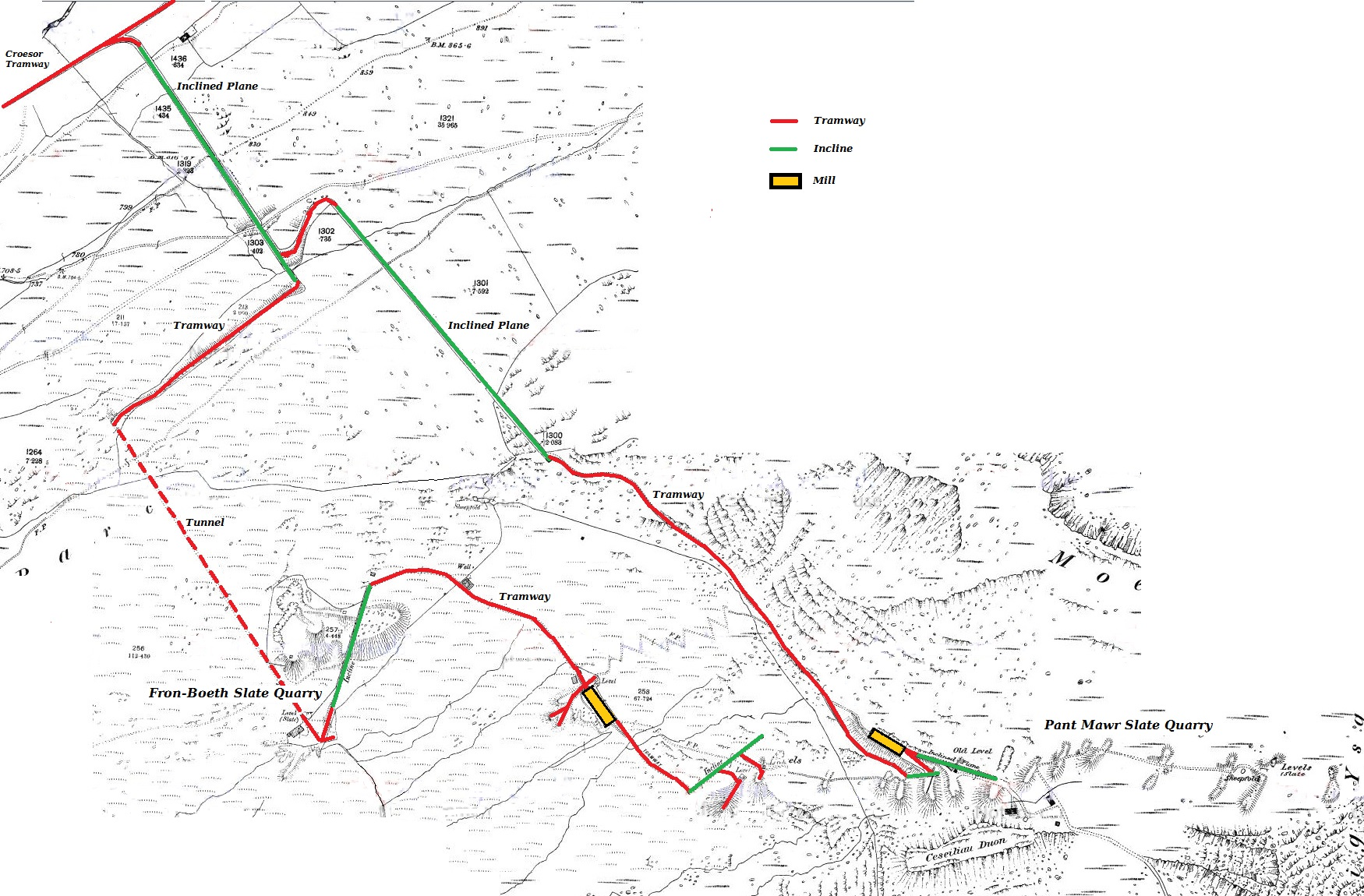
A composite map of the Pant Mawr and Fron-Boeth quarries dating from 1899 and 1900

Fron-Boeth was an ambitious attempt, begun in 1886, to extend the Pant Mawr workings, starting from a new mill site at a lower level. It was never particularly successful, but employed around 50 men initially, with production decreasing in the early 1900s. The tramway from the top of the first incline to Pant Mawr had looped northwards in an 'S' shape to reach the foot of the second incline. This route was abandoned, and the first incline was extended upwards, through the drumhouse, to a ledge a little further up the hillside. It followed this ledge towards the south west, and then made a right-angle bend to enter a tunnel, which took it through the ridge between Cwm Croesor and Cwm Maesgwyn. The tunnel was around 500 yards (460 m) long, and was the only significant example of a tunnel created for an access tramway, rather than as part of a mine, in North Wales. There are several spoil tips near the far end to the tunnel, but these are formed of granite waste, as the quarry buildings were constructed from granite, rather than slate. The tramway turned back on itself to reach a second incline, from the head of which a further tramway followed the general direction of the one to Pant Mawr, but at a lower level. The tramway to Pant Mawr had been laid in bridge rails, but that to Fron-Boeth used conventional flat-bottomed rail.

The main mill was steam powered, and above it, a single acting table incline was used to connect to a number of chambers which had been created below the original Pant Mawr workings. The levels were numbered downwards, in a continuation of the numbering scheme adopted by Moelwyn and Pant Mawr, and the mill was on level 18. The building was quite large, and housed at least three saw tables and three dressing machines, although there was room for several more. Beside the mill is a large Lancashire boiler, which was used to store water. A second mill was built near to the exit tunnel in the 1890s, and was designated as level 22. Its purpose may have been to serve lower levels, as the quarry extended down the hillside, or it may have been to process output from the Cefn-y-braich quarry. This consisted of two open terraces, which employed about 20 men between 1877 and 1883. It was subsequently absorbed into the Fron-Boeth operation, and the terraces became levels 19 and 20 in the Fron-Boeth numbering scheme.

Like so many enterprises, precise details are often a little contradictory. There are entries in the Croesor Tramway accounts for Pant Mawr from September 1877 until May 1892. Separate entries for Fron-Boeth begin in 1886. Boyd states that Pant Mawr had been abandoned by 1916, and the tramway lifted by 1920, although large scale Ordnance Survey maps show no rails in 1900. Working of Fron-Boeth quarry ceased during the First World War, although the rails on the tramway remained in situ for many years.

=== Remains of the quarries today ===
Several of the Pant Mawr adits are still open, and the inclines from them to the mill are still in good condition. Much of the mill area is still intact, and the tramway track to the top of the inclines has survived. The drum house of the upper incline is ruined, but the incline and the embanking of the loop between the inclines is still extant. The drumhouse for the lower incline was demolished when the incline was extended. A feature of the Fron-Boeth mill is a large Lancashire boiler, which must have been conveyed to site via the Pant Mawr tramway, as it is too large to fit through the tunnel. There is a slate lined channel beside the single acting table incline, indicating that it may have been a water balance. There are foundations for an elevated office structure part way along the tramway. The drumhouse and incline are in reasonable condition, but the mill near the tunnel is ruined. The tunnel, one of the longest cut for horse drawn traffic, is accessible for most of its length, although it has collapsed near the northern portal. Some chambers have been cut within it. The drumhouse on the final incline, which was built to replace the one lower down when the Pant Mawr tramway was abandoned, includes some brake gear, and there are cable rollers on the incline.

== Bibliography ==
- Boyd, James (1972). Narrow Gauge Railways in South Caernarvonshire. Oakwood Press.
- Gwyn, David (2015). Welsh Slate. Royal Commission on the Ancient and Historical Monuments of Wales. ISBN 978-1-871184-51-8.
- Richards, Alun John (1991). A Gazeteer of the Welsh Slate Industry. Gwasg Carreg Gwalch. ISBN 978-0-86381-196-8.
- Richards, Alun John (1999). The Slate Regions of North and Mid Wales. Gwasg Carreg Gwalch. ISBN 978-0-86381-552-2.
