= Croesor Tramway =

Tramway in Wales

Coordinates: 52°58′55″N 4°2′25″W

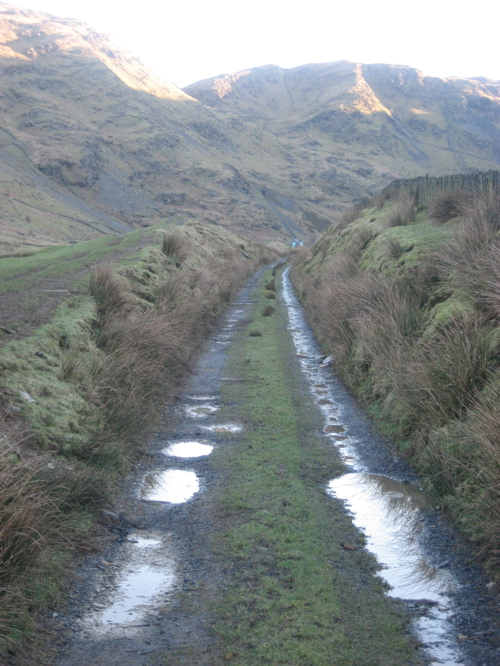
- The trackbed of the Croesor Tramway in Cwm Croesor, 2007

Overview
- Headquarters: Porthmadog
- Locale: Wales
- Dates of operation: 1864–1922
- Successor: Welsh Highland Railway

Technical
- Track gauge: 2 ft (610 mm)
- Length: 6.5 miles (10.5 km)

The Croesor Tramway was a Welsh, 2 ft (610 mm) narrow gauge railway line built to carry slate from the Croesor slate mines to Porthmadog. It was built in 1864 without an act of Parliament and was operated using horse power.

The tramway was absorbed into the Croesor and Portmadoc Railway in 1865 and later became the Portmadoc, Croesor and Beddgelert Tram Railway in 1879. Part of its route, from Croesor Junction to Porthmadog, was taken over by the Welsh Highland Railway in 1922, and upgraded to allow the operation of steam locomotives. The remainder of the line continued as a horse-drawn tramway, and operated as such until the mid-1940s.

== History ==
Slate quarrying in the remote Cwm Croesor (Croesor valley) dates back to at least 1846 when the Croesor Quarry opened. Quarrying expanded in the early 1860s and transportation to the shipping wharfs at Porthmadog became a limiting factor. In 1862 discussion began to construct a tramway to connect the valley with the sea. An initial company, the Croesor Valley Railroad was proposed under the ownership of Hugh Beaver Roberts and two other quarry proprietors.

In the meantime, slate from the Croesor Quarry was being hauled by pack mule over to the adjacent Cwm Orthin and down to the Ffestiniog Railway at Tanygrisiau, a long and dangerous journey.

Croesor and Portmadoc Railway Act 1865
- Act of Parliament
- Parliament of the United Kingdom
- Long title: An Act to incorporate a Company for maintaining an existing Railway from Carrey Hylldrem in the County of Merioneth to Portmadoc in the County of Carnarvon, and making an Extension thereof.
- Citation: 28 & 29 Vict. c. ccxcv

Dates
- Royal assent: 5 July 1865

Text of statute as originally enacted

In 1863 Beaver Roberts commenced construction of the tramway, by now known as the Croesor Tramway. It opened to goods and mineral traffic on or before 1 August 1864. The Rhosydd Quarry at the head of the valley was connected that year. It was absorbed by the Croesor and Portmadoc Railway Company by the Croesor and Portmadoc Railway Act 1865 (28 & 29 Vict. c. ccxcv).

The Extension Railway by this Act authorized shall commence by a Junction with the said existing Railway at or near its Termination at Portmadoc, and shall terminate at or near Borth-y-Gest at Trwyn-Penyclogwyn, and be wholly situate in the said Parish of Ynyscynhaiarn in the County of Carnarvon. — Section 29, Croesor and Portmadoc Railway Act 1865 (28 & 29 Vict. c. ccxcv)

The Rhosydd quarry failed in 1873, but a new company was formed to reopen it as the New Rhosydd quarry in 1874.

Portmadoc, Croesor and Beddgelert Tram Railway Act 1879
- Act of Parliament
- Parliament of the United Kingdom
- Long title: An Act to enable the Croesor and Portmadoc Railway Company to make and maintain a new Branch Line of Railway; to change their name; and for other purposes.
- Citation: 42 & 43 Vict. c. clxxi

Dates
- Royal assent: 21 July 1879

Text of statute as originally enacted

The Portmadoc, Croesor and Beddgelert Tram Railway Act 1879 (42 & 43 Vict. c. clxxi) changed the name of the railway company to the Portmadoc, Croesor and Beddgelert Tram Railway Company, and authorised to build a branch to Beddgelert, although this was never constructed. The company went into receivership in 1882 and was sold in 1902 to the Portmadoc, Beddgelert and South Snowdon Railway, one of the precursors of the Welsh Highland Railway.

The railway herein-before referred to and authorised by this Act is,—

A railway, three miles seven furlongs four chains seventy links in length, commencing in the parish of Llanfrothen, in the county of Merioneth, by a junction with the Croesor and Portmadoc Railway, and terminating in the parish of Beddgelert, in the said county, on the south side of the River Glasslyn, at or near the northernmost point of the fence dividing the fields respectively belonging or reputed to belong to Mrs. Ann McKellar and Lord Harlech. — Section 4, Portmadoc, Croesor and Beddgelert Tram Railway Act 1879 (42 & 43 Vict. c. clxxi)

The tramway continued to carry slate from the quarries along Cwm Croesor until 1944, when the last wagons were sent down the Rhosydd incline and on towards Porthmadog. The track from Croesor Junction to Croesor Village was lifted between 1948 and 1949. The remaining track, between Croesor and Blaen y Cwm continued in unofficial use by local farmers until the late 1950s.

== Route ==
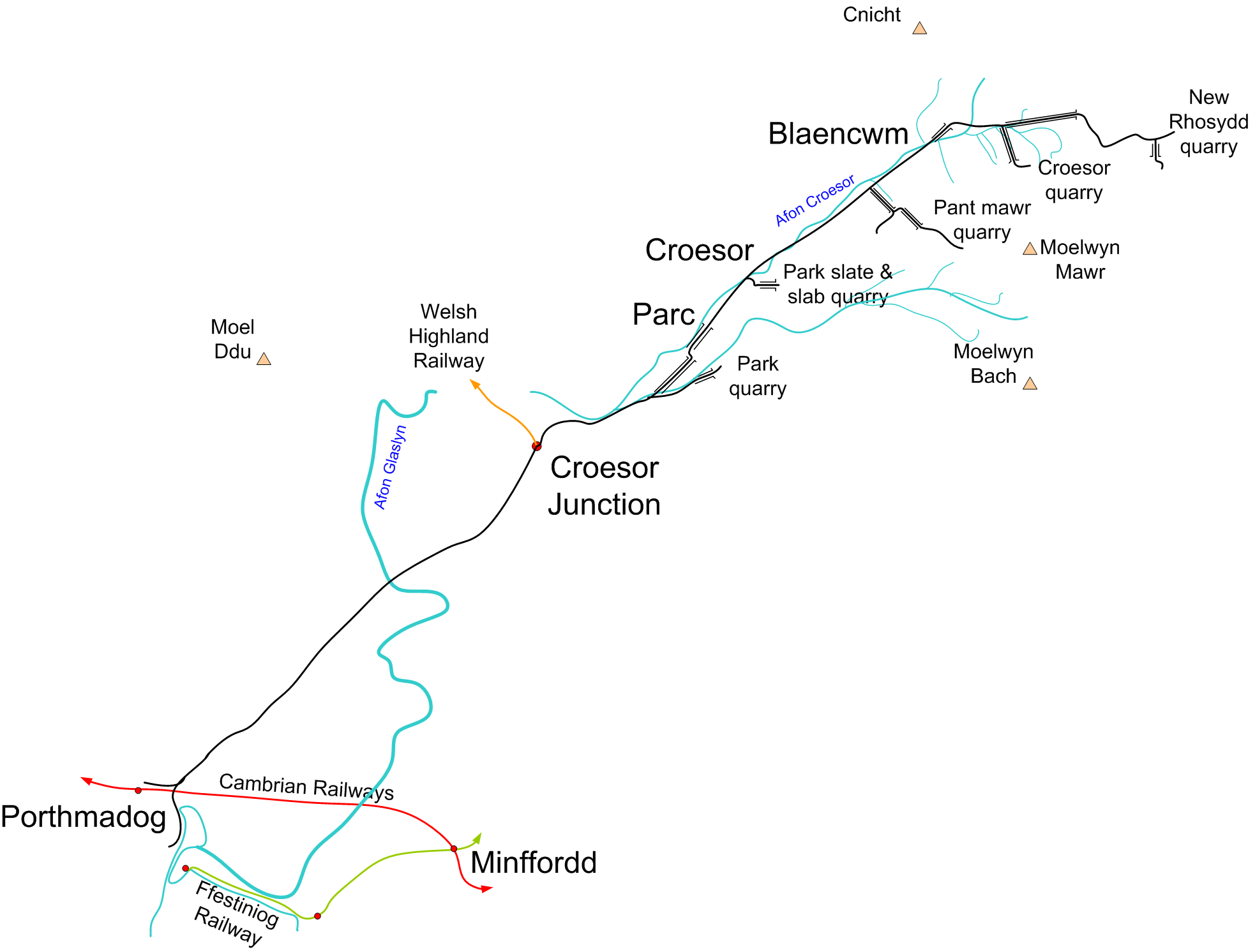
Map of the Croesor Tramway

=== Across Traeth Mawr ===
The Croesor Tramway ran from the wharves at Porthmadog to the quarries at the head of Cwm Croesor. The southern end of the line connected to the Ffestiniog Railway near a timber yard at Cornhill. The line swung to the north and ran through the western edge of the town. North of the Snowdon Mill it crossed the Cambrian Railways Machynlleth-Pwllheli line on the level before heading north across Traeth Mawr - the great polder behind The Cob. A short standard gauge branch from Porthmadog Station ran on the western side of the tramway to meet the narrow gauge at Beddgelert Sidings. This was an interchange point where much of the slate from the quarries was transferred to the Cambrian for shipment onwards.

From Beddgelert Siding, the line ran north east across Traeth Mawr. It crossed the Afon Glaslyn 1 mile (1.6 km) north of Porthmadog. This was initially a wooden bridge, though later it was replaced with a substantial stone bridge that carried both the railway and the road over the river. The road and railway ran parallel almost as far as Croesor Junction. Croesor Junction did not exist before 1901, when the tramway was purchased by the Portmadoc, Beddgelert and South Snowdon Railway. After 1901 it became the junction between the tramway heading north east and what would become the Welsh Highland Railway heading north west. The tramway continued to Pont Garreg-Hylldrem where it ran alongside the Afon Maesgwm for a short distance. Here the tramway climbed the first of a series of inclines into Cwm Croesor.

=== Inclines to Croesor village ===
The first incline, the Lower Parc incline, rises around 200 feet (61 m) past Beudy-Newydd farm house. At the top of the incline the tramway turns through a tight s-bend and immediately arrives at the foot of the Upper Parc incline. This rises another 300 feet (91 m) and ends in a winding house that straddles the tramway - this has been preserved and converted into a home. The tramway continues to run north-east entering the village of Croesor where is crosses the main road into the village on the level.

=== Cwm Croesor ===
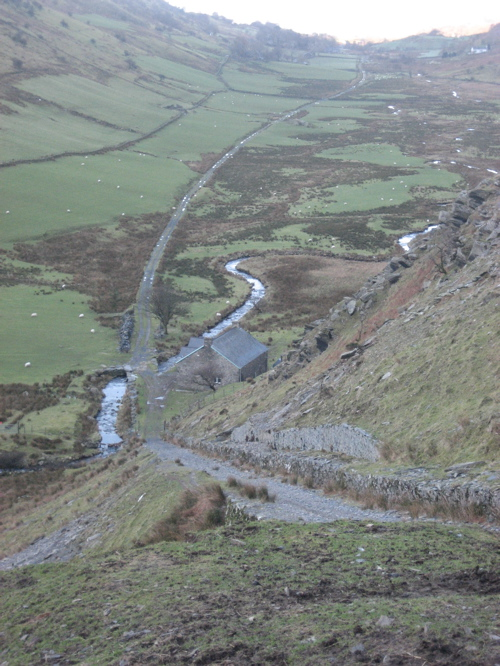
Croesor valley from the top of the Blaen y Cwm incline

North from the village, the line crosses Afon Croesor on a low slate-built bridge then continues along the bottom of Cwm Croesor. The valley floor here is nearly level and the line travels almost straight to the north east. Apart from a shallow cutting near Croesor Uchaf farm, this section of the tramway has no significant engineering features. This section terminates at Blaen y Cwm. Here the tramway crosses Afon Croesor once more, again on a low slate bridge. Immediately on the left is Blaen y Cwm power station, a very early hydro-electric turbine, used to provide power to Croesor Quarry 600 feet (180 m) above. This is also the foot of the Blaen y Cwm incline which rises 300 feet (91 m) up the end wall of the valley.

=== North of Blaen y Cwm ===
From the top of the Blaen y Cwm incline the line turns sharply eastward and takes on a different character. It runs across the end of the valley, on well-built embankments and through cuttings, following the contours. About 1/2 mile (0.80 km) from the head of the incline it crosses a tributary of the Afon Croesor on a high bridge; the bridge was restored in the 1990s. Shortly afterwards the line curves to the north and reaches its upper terminus under the cliffs of Bwlch y Rhosydd. Here two extremely long inclines rise, one north to reach the Rhosydd Tramway and one east to reach Croesor Quarry.

=== Branches ===
A large number of branches from the tramway served the quarries of Cwm Croesor. The first of these branched off at the foot of the Lower Parc incline and served the Parc Slate Quarry, a significant source of traffic for the tramway. The branch ran along the east bank of the Afon Maesgwym and rose by a substantial incline to the quarry. The next branch was just south of Croesor village and served the separate Parc Slate and Slab Quarry. This branch curved away on the eastern side of the tramway and reached the quarry by a short incline.

Halfway between Croesor village and the foot of the Blaen y Cwm incline, another incline branched off to the east. This incline climbed directly up the side of the valley. At the head of the incline, two tramways ran north and south along the contour line of the hill. The northern line ran via a further incline to Pant Mawr Quarry, which lies at the head of Cwm Maesgwyn. The connection to Pant Mawr was short lived, being dismantled between 1891 and 1901. It was replaced by the line heading south, which went to Fron-Boeth Quarry which was also within Cwm Maesgwyn, and about 1 mile (1.6 km) south-west of Pant Mawr. The tramway to Fron-Boeth went through a long tunnel beneath the Braich-Parc ridge that separates Cwm Croesor and Cwm Maesgwyn. A further incline and tramway connected Fron-Boeth to a mill and adit that served the former Pant Mawr mine. This line was still in use in the 1920s.

The final pair of branches ran from the northern terminus of the tramway proper. Two immense inclines began here, one climbing 700 feet (210 m) directly eastwards to Croesor Quarry, the other heading nearly north and rising 750 feet (230 m) to connect to a high tramway to Rhosydd Quarry. This latter incline formed a parabolic curve and at its head climbed at 1 in 0.97, one of the steepest inclines in Wales. From the head of the incline, the Rhosydd Tramway ran about 1 mile (1.6 km) to the mill level. This tramway was particularly well engineered, running for much of its distance on high embankments hundreds of feet above Cwm Croesor.

== Post closure ==
After the demise of the original Welsh Highland Railway, the stub of the tramway from Croesor village to the foot of the Blaen y Cwm incline continued in use to carry agricultural products for local farms, until the late 1950s. The rails from this section were recovered some time in the 1960s by members of the Welsh Highland Railway preservation society and were stored at the site of Beddgelert station.

The section from Croesor Junction to the slate quarries will probably never re-open as the quarries have long since closed. However the part of the Croesor tramway that ran from Croesor Junction to Porthmadog has been rebuilt as part of the resurrection of the Welsh Highland Railway from Caernarfon to Porthmadog. The section between Croesor Junction and Pont Croesor opened in May 2010. The section from Pont Croesor to Porthmadog reopened on 8 January 2011, whereby it linked up with the Ffestiniog Railway to allow through trains to Blaenau Ffestiniog railway station via the Porthmadog cross town link.

== See also ==
- British narrow gauge slate railways
