= Parc, Penrhyndeudraeth =

House in Llanfrothen, Gwynedd, Wales

Coordinates: 52.982°N 4.041°W

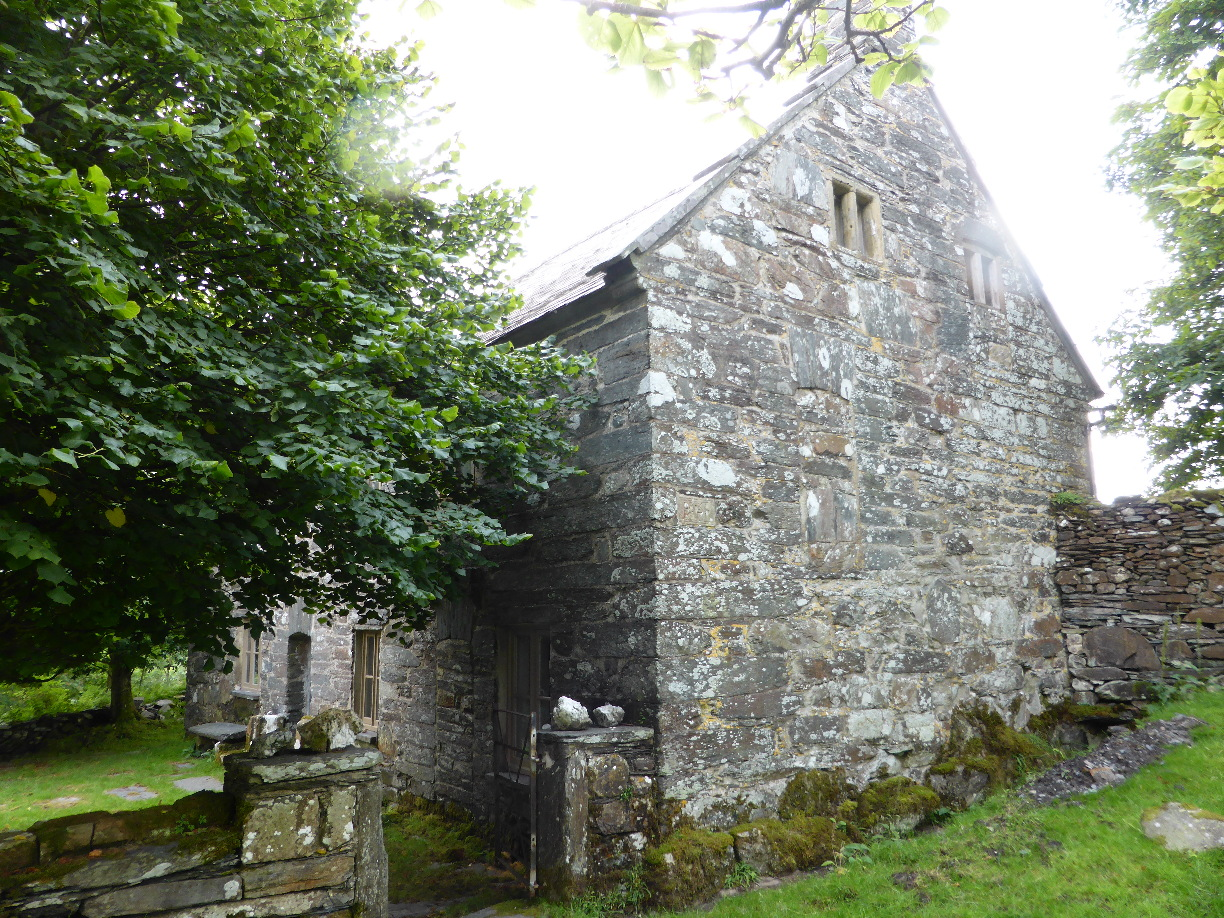

Parc (meaning Park in English) is the name of an ancient mansion found near the village of Croesor in the community of Llanfrothen near Penrhyndeudraeth, in Gwynedd, Wales. The former mansion has been in ruins since the end of the 17th century when the resident Anwyl Family moved to Llugwy. Thomas Nicholas described the site in his Annals and Antiquities of the Counties and County Families of Wales [see box].

"The older abode of the Anwyls, Parc, near Penrhyndeudraeth, although long neglected, has not altogether disappeared. It is approached by a drive of more than a mile in length. In front of the site of the house are four terraces, 150 feet long by 50 wide, supported by walls 12 feet high. The part of the house still standing, built in 1671, is said to have been the ball-room. On the gable are curious large round chimneys. On either side of the front door are pieces of beautifully carved stone, formerly gilded, from the chimney-piece in the dining-hall; and one sees here and there, sometimes even in the walls of the present sheepfolds, mullions from the windows in freestone. At the back of the old mansion there are the ruins of a stone bath with seats round it and steps to descend. The "gate-house" (lodge) is still standing, but much dilapidated."

— Annals

The novelist, poet, and playwright Richard A.W. Hughes rented a cottage here from close friends Clough and Amabel Williams-Ellis during the summers from 1934 until the Second World War, eventually taking in six evacuee children and telling stories with them that are collected in Don't Blame Me! (1940).

Parc is a Grade II* listed building and its gardens are designated Grade II on the Cadw/ICOMOS Register of Parks and Gardens of Special Historic Interest in Wales.
