= Snowdonia Slate Trail =

Long-distance footpath in North Wales

- Llwybr Llechi Eryri
- Length: 83 mi (134 km)
- Location: Snowdonia, Wales
- Established: 2017
- Trailheads: Circular from Bangor
- Use: Hiking
- Elevation gain/loss: 14,603 ft (4,451 m)
- Highest point: 1,690 ft (520 m)
- Difficulty: Very challenging
- Season: All year
- Website: www.snowdoniaslatetrail.org

Snowdonia Slate Trail (Welsh: Llwybr Llechi Eryri) is a long distance footpath, running 83 miles (134 km) as a circular route around Northern Snowdonia starting from Bangor. It passes through the main areas and heritage sites associated with the slate industry, and also through some of the major landscapes.

It is possible to do the trail in seven days using public transport based in Caernarfon or Bangor.

An ultra marathon is organised around the entire trail each year.

== The route ==
The trail is arranged in 13 sections, ranging in length from 4 to 13 miles:

(Distances, ascent and time are taken from the website.)

- Section 1 - Bangor to Bethesda - (Distance: 10.2 km, 6.3mls; Ascent: 325m, 1050ft; Time: 3 – 4hrs)
- Section 2 - Bethesda to Llanberis - (Distance: 11.6 km, 7.2mls; Ascent: 360m, 1200ft; Time: 3 – 4hrs)
- Section 3 - Llanberis to Waunfawr - (Distance: 6.1 km, 3.8mls; Ascent: 310m, 1000ft; Time: 2 – 3hrs)
- Section 4 - Waunfawr to Nantlle - (Distance: 9.5 km, 5.9mls; Ascent: 270m, 900ft; Time: 3 – 4hrs)
- Section 5 - Nantlle to Rhyd Ddu - (Distance: 8.2 km, 5.1mls; Ascent: 260m, 850ft; Time: 2 – 3hrs)
- Section 6 - Rhyd Ddu to Beddgelert - (Distance: 8.4 km, 5.2mls; Ascent: 110m, 350ft; Time: 1.5 – 2.5hrs)
- Section 7 - Beddgelert to Croesor - (Distance: 7.2 km, 4.4mls; Ascent: 400m, 1300ft; Time: 2 – 3hrs)
- Section 8 - Croesor to Tanygrisiau - (Distance: 7.4 km, 4.6mls; Ascent: 470m, 1550ft; Time: 3 - 4hrs)
- Section 9 - Tanygrisiau to Llan Ffestiniog - (Distance: 8.6 km, 5.4mls; Ascent: 250m, 850ft; Time: 2.5 – 3.5hrs)
- Section 10 - Llan Ffestiniog to Penmachno - (Distance: 21.3 km, 13.2mls; Ascent: 880m, 2850ft; Time: 8 – 9hrs)
- Section 11 - Penmachno to Betws y Coed - (Distance: 8.6 km, 5.3mls; Ascent: 150m, 500ft; Time: 2 – 3hrs)
- Section 12 - Betws y Coed to Capel Curig - (Distance: 9.5 km, 5.9mls; Ascent: 420m, 1350ft; Time: 3 – 4hrs)
- Section 13 - Capel Curig to Bethesda - (Distance: 17.6 km, 11.0mls; Ascent: 150m, 500ft; Time: 5 – 6hrs)

The route also passes close to several narrow-gauge railways, most of which were formerly linked to the slate industry, namely the Penrhyn Quarry Railway, Llanberis Lake Railway, Snowdon Mountain Railway, the Welsh Highland Railway and the Ffestiniog Railway.

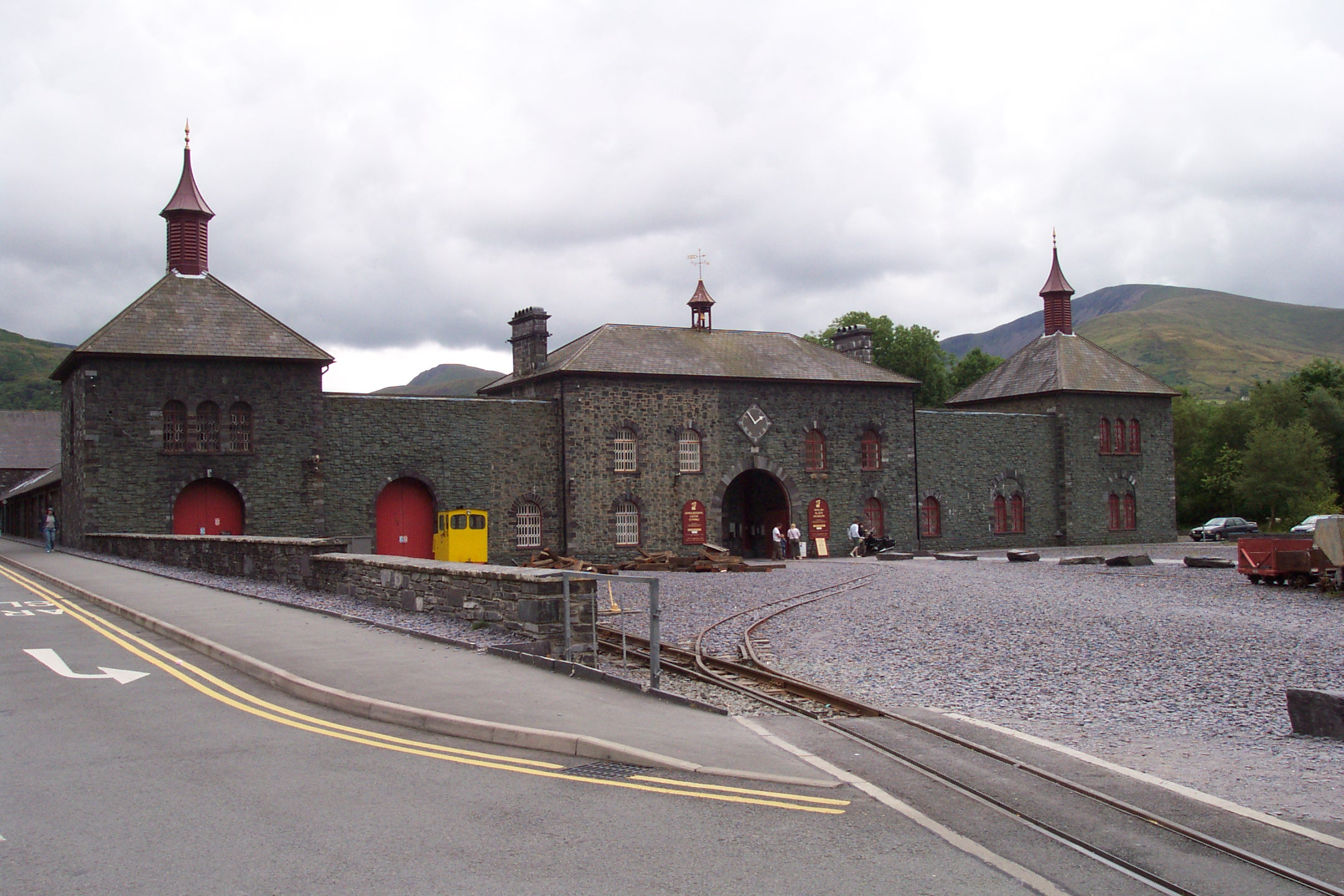
The National Slate Museum in Llanberis
