= Slate industry =

Industry of the extraction and processing of slate

The slate industry is the industry related to the extraction and processing of slate. Slate is either quarried from a slate quarry or reached by tunneling in a slate mine. Common uses for slate include as a roofing material, a flooring material, gravestones and memorial tablets, and electrical insulation.

Slate mines are found around the world. 90% of Europe's natural slate used for roofing originates from the Slate Industry in Spain. The major slate mining region in the United Kingdom is the Lake district, with Honister slate mine being the last working slate mine, the only producers of the world famous Westmorland greenslate. In the remainder of Continental Europe and the Americas, Portugal, Italy, Germany, Brazil, the east coast of Newfoundland, the Slate Valley of Vermont, New York, Pennsylvania, and Virginia are important producing regions. The Slate Valley area, centering on a town called Granville in the state of New York is one of the places in the world where colored slate (i.e. slate which is not grey or blue) is obtained. (A fuller account is given in the article Slate: section Slate extraction.)

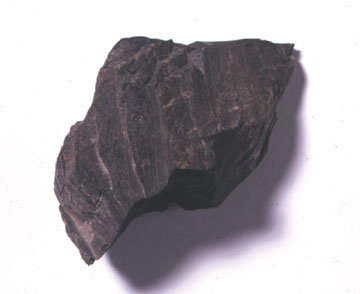
Shale can metamorphose into slate; sometimes the fossils may remain intact

== Slate industry in Spain ==
Ninety percent of Europe's natural slate used for roofing originates from the slate industry in Spain, with the region of Galicia being the primary production source.

In Galicia, the larger slate production companies are concentrated in Valdeorras in Ourense, with other important sites being situated in Quiroga, Ortigueira and Mondoñedo.

The slate deposits in this region of northern Spain are over 500 million years old, having formed during the Palaeozoic period. The colour and texture of the slate produced is largely dependent upon the tectonic environment, the source of the sedimentary material from which the slate is comprised, and the chemical and physical conditions prevalent during the sedimentation process. The region has been subjected to periods of volcanism and magmatic activity, leading to a unique geological development.

An important use of Spanish slate is as a roofing material. It is particularly suitable for this purpose as it has a low water absorption index of less than 0.4%, making it very resistant to frost damage and breakage due to freezing. Tiles produced from Spanish slate are usually hung using a unique hook fixing method, which reduces the appearance of weak points on the tile since no holes are drilled, and allows narrower tiles to be used to create roofing features such as valleys and domes. Hook fixing is especially prevalent in areas subject to severe climatic conditions, since there is a greater resistance to wind uplift as the lower edge of the slate is secured.

== Slate industry in Wales ==
=== Background ===
Slate has been quarried in north Wales for almost two millennia with the Segontium Roman fort at Caernarfon being roofed by local slate in the late second century. Export of slate has been carried out for several centuries, which was recently confirmed by the discovery in the Menai Strait of the wreck of a 16th-century wooden ship carrying finished slates.

Large-scale commercial slate mining in North Wales began with the opening of the Cae Braich y Cafn quarry, later to become the Penrhyn Quarry near Bethesda in the Ogwen Valley in 1782. Welsh output was far ahead of other areas and by 1882, 92% of Britain's production was from Wales (451,000 t): the quarries at Penrhyn and Dinorwic produced half of this between them.

The men worked the slate in partnerships of four, six or eight and these were known as "Bargain Gangs". "Bargains" were let by the "Bargain Letter" when a price for a certain area of rock was agreed. Adjustments were made according to the quality of the slate and the proportion of "bad" rock. The first Monday of every month was "Bargain Letting Day" when these agreements were made between men and management. Half the partners worked the quarry face and the others were in the dressing sheds producing the finished slates. In the Glyndyfrdwy mines at Moel Fferna each bargain worked a horizontal stretch of 10 by 15 yards. Duchesses, Marchionesses, Countesses, Viscountesses, Ladies, Small Ladies, Doubles and Randoms were all sizes of slates produced.

Rubblers helped to keep the chambers free from waste: one ton of saleable slate could produce up to 30 tons of waste. It is the mountainous heaps of this very same waste that is perhaps the first thing to strike someone visiting the old regions nowadays. The men had to pay for their ropes and chains, for tools and for services such as sharpening and repairing. Subs (advances) were paid every week, everything being settled up on the "Day of the Big Pay". If conditions had not been good, the men could end up owing the management money. At Moel Fferna a team could produce up to 35 tons of finished slate a week. In 1877 they received about 7 shillings a ton for this. After paying wages for the manager, clerks and 'trammers' the company could make a clear profit of twice this amount. This system was not finally abolished until after the Second World War.

=== Working methods ===
Early workings tended to be in surface pits, but as the work progressed downwards, it became necessary to work underground. This was often accompanied by the driving of one or more adits to gain direct access to a Level. In some rare instances, such as Moel Fferna, there is no trace of surface workings and the workings were entirely underground.

Chambers were usually driven from the bottom, by means of a "roofing shaft" which was then continued across the width of the chamber: the chamber would then be worked downwards. Slate was freed from the rockface by blasting in shot holes hammered (and later drilled) into the rock.

Slate mines were usually worked in chambers which followed the slate vein, connected via a series of horizontal "Floors" (or "Levels"). The chambers varied in size between mines and were divided by "pillars" or walls which supported the roof. The floors were connected by underground "Inclines" which used wedge-shaped trolleys to move trucks between levels.

In some mines, where slate was worked away below the main haulage floor, the route was maintained through the construction of a wooden bridge across the chamber, often supported from chains attached to the roof above. These bridges could be as much as 100 feet/30 m above the floor below.

Large slab of rock were removed from the chamber, typically on railway wagons, and taken to the mill. The slabs were first sawn to the required size, then split to specific thicknesses - this was done by hand for many centuries using a chisel held at a specific angle to achieve a clean split while maintaining the material's integrity. Finally, the corners of each piece were bevelled to allow water to flow over the slate once in place on the roof. A final inspection and sorting took place before they were packaged for transport.

The process of slate quarrying generates vast amounts of waste rock - often more than 90% of the rock mined was discarded. No chemical processes were used in the production, and the waste was disposed at dumps.

=== Significant mines ===
In North Gwynedd, the large slate producing quarries were usually confined to open-cast workings, sometimes with an adit to gain access to the bottom of the pit:

- Penrhyn Quarry, Bethesda. The largest slate producing quarry in the world. Bought by Alfred McAlpine plc in 1964.
- Dinorwic Quarry, Llanberis.
- Cilgwyn quarry, Nantlle Valley. Dating from the 12th century it is thought to be the oldest in Wales.

In the Blaenau Ffestiniog area, most of the workings were underground as the slate veins are steeply angled and open cast workings would require the removal of a massive amount of rock to gain access to the slate. The larger mines in the Ffestiniog area include:

- Llechwedd quarry – now open to the public as a "tourist mine".
- Manod – used by the National Gallery, London to store artworks in World War II
- Maenofferen
- Oakeley – now partially untopped as an opencast working by Alfred McAlpine plc
- Cwmorthin
- Rhosydd
- Croesor

There were also a number of slate mines in the Llangollen area which produced a much darker "black" slate:

- Berwyn
- Deeside and Moel Fferna
- Penarth

Another cluster of mines were found in mid Wales centered on Corris. These all worked a pair of slate veins that ran across the Cambrian mountain range from Tywyn in the west through Corris and Aberllefenni in the Dulas Valley to the mines around Dinas Mawddwy in the east. Slate was also mined in Pembrokeshire in places like Maenclochog.

=== Remains ===
Most underground slate mines in north Wales were closed by the 1960s although some open-cast quarries have remained open, including the Penrhyn Quarry and the untopping work at Oakeley in Blaenau Ffestiniog. Work also continues at Berwyn near Llangollen. The final large-scale underground working to close was Maenofferen Quarry (which is owned by the Llechwedd tourist mine) in 1999 although opencast quarrying continues at this location.

Many of the mines are now in a state of considerable decay and those that are accessible should not be entered as they are on private property and contain many hidden dangers.

The lower levels of many mines are now flooded and collapses are commonplace; for example, the hillside above the Rhosydd workings has many pits where the roofs of the chambers below have collapsed.

== Other slate producing areas in Great Britain ==
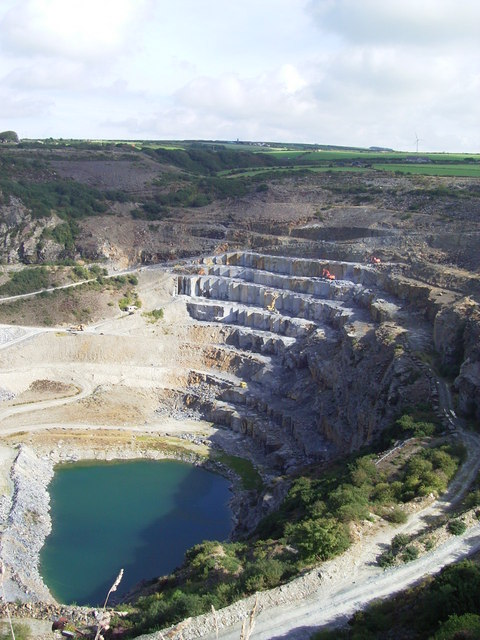
Delabole Quarry in Cornwall

The most significant non-Welsh British slate industry is that of Cornwall and Devon where the Delabole Quarry is thought to be the largest single quarry in the island. Many of these are no longer worked owing to lower costs of extraction in the larger British workings. The quarrying of slate in Cornwall is known to have been carried out from the late mediaeval period and there was a considerable export trade from some of the quarries near the coasts in the 19th century.

Slate has also been quarried at Swithland in Leicestershire.

There are considerable workings in Cumbria. During the last 500 years, much slate extraction has taken place in the Lake District at both surface quarries and underground mines. The major workings are:

- Broughton Moor
- Old Man Complex (Coniston); Cove Quarries (south of Coniston Old Man)
- Elterwater Quarries
- Hodge Close
- Honister Slate Mine (including Yew Crag and Dubs)
- Kentmere Workings
- Kirkby Moor (Burlington Slate Quarries)
- Petts, Kirkstone
- Little Langdale Quarries
- Skiddaw Slate
- Tilberthwaite
- Common Wood, Ulpha

Slate was also quarried in Scotland.

== Slate industry in North America ==
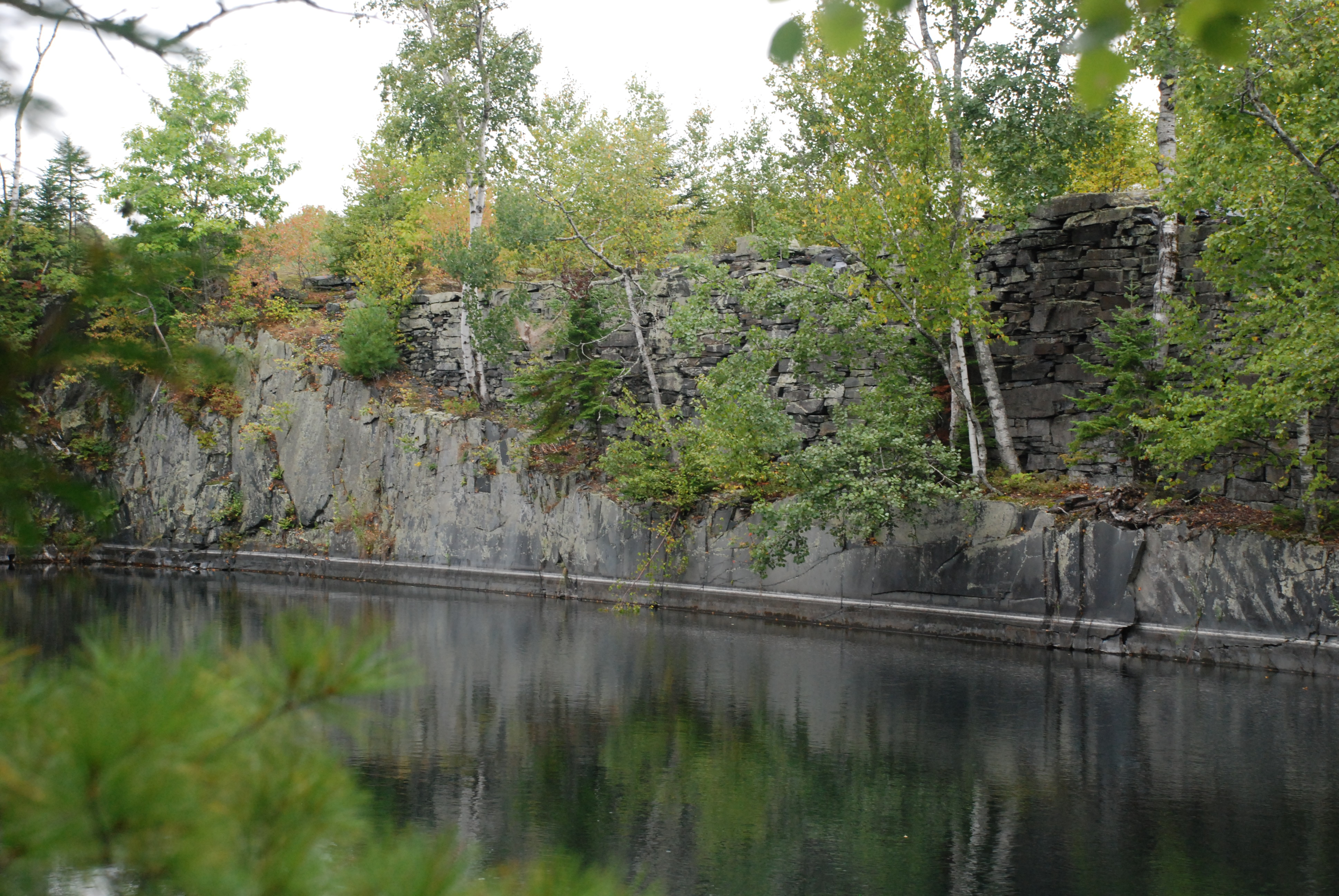
Slate quarry at Monson, Maine

Slate was first quarried in the United States as early as 1734 along the Pennsylvania Maryland border; however, it was not until 1785 that the first commercial slate quarry was opened in the United States, by William Docher in Peach Bottom Township, Pennsylvania. Production was limited to that which could be consumed in local markets until the middle of the nineteenth century. The slate industry in the United States has existed in several locations in the country including areas in the western states, however the majority of slate has come from three principal regions along the Great Valley of the Appalachian Mountains. Of those regions, the Taconic Mountains region of Vermont and New York, as well as Lancaster, Lehigh and Northampton counties in Pennsylvania all still have active quarries.

The Pennsylvania Historical and Museum Commission states that in the Slateford Water Gap area the first verified quarry started some time around 1808 . The industry in this region of Pennsylvania spread across the northern edges of both Lehigh and Northampton counties which contain between them the remains of approximately 400 individual quarries. The origins of quarrying in the Lehigh Valley are obscured by conflicting evidence, although it is safest to say that it started near the town of Slateford in the early Nineteenth Century and moved toward Bangor over a fifty-year period. By 1929, the value of slate production in Pennsylvania was approximately 5 million dollars, accounting for almost half of the 11 million dollar value of slate production for the entire United States. Quarries in this region of the country remained active throughout the first quarter of the 20th century producing roofing slate, slate for electrical uses, as well as being the largest producer of school slates and chalkboards in the country. The Slatington Slate Trade report for January 4 of 1880 showed that quarries in the town of Slatington alone had shipped 81,402 squares of roofing slates (over 8 million square feet) as well as 40,486 cases of school slates and 243 cases of blackboards.

The Slate Valley (the district of Granville, New York) is well known for its slate. Slate was quarried in 1839 at Fair Haven, Vermont. An influx of immigrants from the North Wales slate quarrying communities saw a boom in slate production that peaked in the latter half of the 19th century. The slate of the region comes in a variety of colors, notably green, gray, black and red. Some production continued in 2003 with 23 operating full-time mines employing 348 people.

Additionally, one of the oldest quarries in America continues to quarry slate in Buckingham County, Virginia. Their trademark Buckingham Slate has been continually quarried since the 18th century and has a distinct, unfading blue/black color and Mica sheen. Buckingham Slate is used on many Federal buildings in the Washington, D.C. area.

Large scale slate quarrying also took place around the town of Monson, Maine where an extensive series of quarries flourished from the 1860s onwards. A small scale quarrying and dressing operation continues in Monson into the 21st century.

Slate is also found in the Arctic and was used by the Inuit to make the blades for ulus.

== Slate industry in Brazil ==
95% of the slate extraction in Brazil comes from Minas Gerais. Slate from this region is formed differently from traditional slate areas such as Galicia. Such products are sedimentary rocks that have split along their original bedding plane, whereas true slate has been subjected to metamorphism and does not split along bedding, but rather along planes associated with the realignment of minerals during metamorphism. This realignment, known as ‘schistosity’, bears no relationship to the original horizontal bedding planes .

The independent Fundación Centro Tecnológico de la Pizarra’s report into the ’Technical properties of Bambui Slate from the State of Minas Gerais (Brazil) to ascertain its compliance with the Standard EN12326’ describes how certain products originating from Brazil on sale in the UK, are not entitled to bear the CE mark. Because such Brazilian products display higher water absorption indexes than those from other areas such as Galicia, this makes them less suitable for use as roofing tiles since the study showed a significant loss of strength when subject to thawing and freezing.

== See also ==
- British industrial narrow gauge railways
- British narrow gauge slate railways
- Mine exploration
