= Croesor quarry =

Disused slate mine in North Wales

Croesor
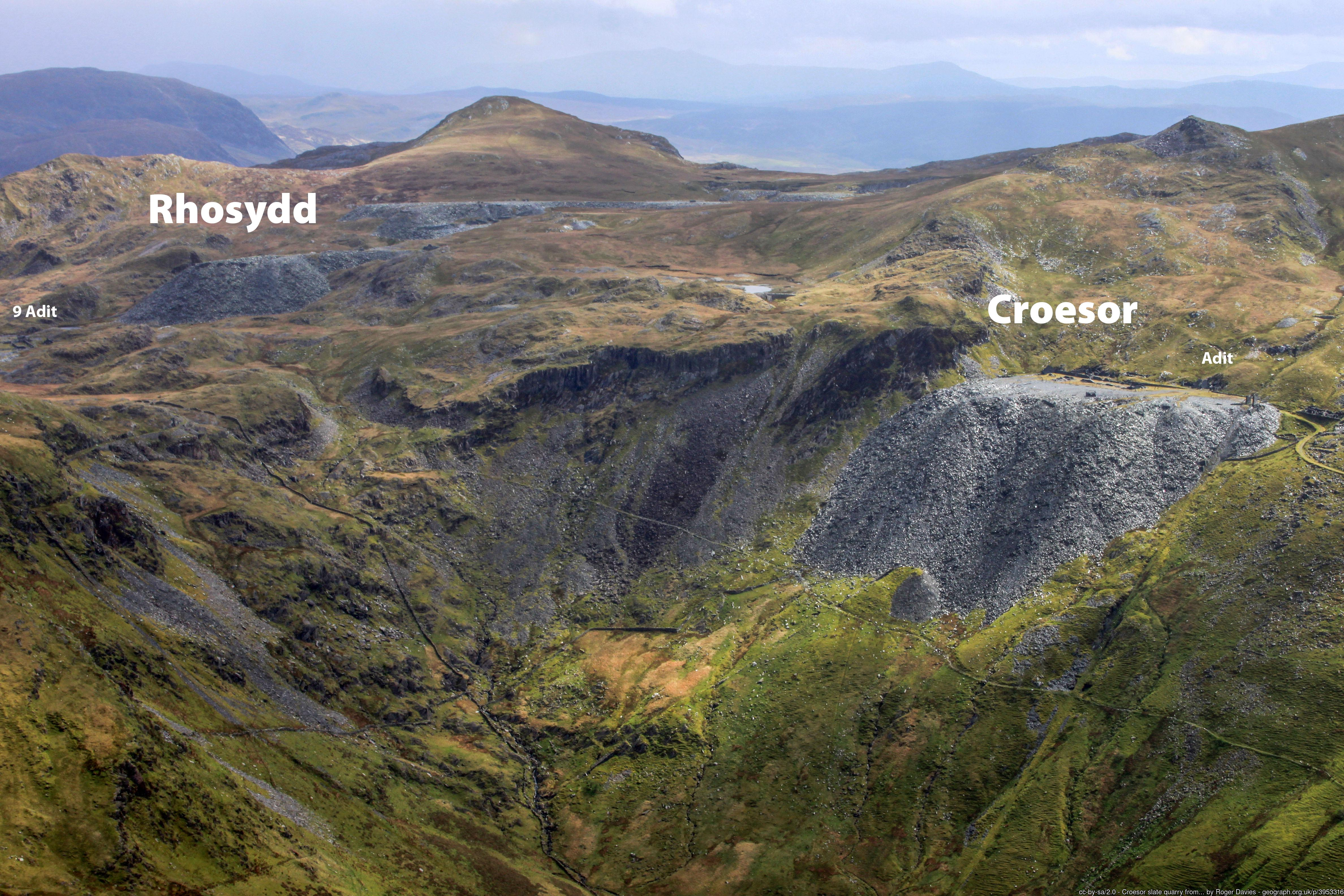
- The quarry in 2014, showing its close proximity to Rhosydd Quarry, with which it interconnects underground.

- Location in Gwynedd
- Location: near Croesor, Gwynedd, Wales, UK; 52.9910°N 4.0016°W grid reference SH626436
- Products: Slate
- Type: Underground Quarry
- Opened: 1846
- Closed: December 1930

Croesor quarry is a large underground slate mine in North Wales which was served by Croesor Tramway. Small scale quarrying began in the 1846, and by 1861, there were two companies in operation. They merged in 1865, a year after the quarry was connected to the newly opened Croesor Tramway. Much money was invested in development work, but volumes of useful slate produced were small, amounting to just 226 tons in 1868. Access to the underground workings was by a single adit, and the surface mill was powered by two water wheels. A change of ownership in 1875 did little to improve the profitability of the quarry, and it closed in 1878 or 1882.

In 1895, the quarry reopened under the direction of Moses Kellow, a fearless innovator who set about modernising working practices and methods. The two-man teams working in the mill were no longer tied to a two-man team working underground, which enabled the mill to operate more efficiently. Following trials with air drills, he decided instead to electrify the mill, building a large hydro-electric station, which generated three-phase alternating current, rather than the direct current recommended by British manufacturers. He obtained motors from Prague, which were used to drive winches and an electric locomotive, the first to work in Wales. The water wheels were supplemented by Pelton wheels, supplied by Gilbert Gilkes of Kendal. His greatest innovation was the Kellow drill, a hydraulic drill for which he obtained six patents between 1898 and 1915. It could drill a 7.5-foot (2.3 m) hole in the slate in under two minutes, much less than the day required using hand drills. The mine was ventilated by a Guibal fan, housed in a fan-house near the entrance to the adit. Peak output under Kellow's direction was between 5,000 and 6,000 tons per year, though it declined in the later years, until the quarry closed in 1930.

The chambers were used by Cookes Explosives to store propellants from the late 1940s until the early 1970s. This ceased when the Central Electricity Generating Board became aware of it, and feared that an underground explosion would damage the dams of the Ffestiniog pumped storage power station. Both lakes were drained until the explosives had been removed. The quarry was worked on seven levels, but the three below the adit level are now flooded. There was an underground link to the nearby Rhosydd quarry, and the "Croesor Rhosydd Through Trip" is a well known, if somewhat dangerous, route for mine explorers.

== History ==
Slate was quarried on a small scale at Croesor from around 1840, and the Croicer Valley & Portmadoc Freehold Slate Company Ltd was set up soon afterwards, but did not last for long.

Croesor Quarry, Llanfrothen, Wales, 2026

=== Early phase ===
Two companies were working the slate by 1861, the Croesor Fawr Slate Quarrying Company Ltd, and the Upper Croesor Slate Quarry Company Ltd. There was close cooperation between them, as in 1865, the Upper company allowed the Fawr company to tip slate waste on their land, and they amalgamated in the following year. At the same time, the Croesor United Slate Company Ltd was set up, with a working capital of £160,000, and a lease to look for slate on Croesor Fawr farm. They also took over the lease held by the Upper company. Hugh Beaver Roberts was in charge of the new company, while Hugh Unsworth McKie was in charge of the Upper company. Both men were directors of the Croesor & Port Madoc Railway, effectively the lower section of the Croesor Tramway below the incline at Carreg-hylldrem. The Managing Director of the new company was James Wyatt, formerly the agent for the Penrhyn quarry, near Bethesda. After 30 June 1867, the chairman was T H Wyatt, and McKie became the manager and secretary.

Between 1868 and 1869, Beaumont, Appleby & Ashwell, a company from London, worked on a contract to cut shafts and tunnels. The rock found was of poor quality, but hopeful that a slate vein of "paying quality" might yet be found, the directors issued debentures to raise additional money to fund the 110 men who were engaged on the development work. Progress below ground was slow, as a band of hard chert was encountered. Beaumont, Appleby & Ashwell were replaced by the Machine Tunnelling Company, and in June 1872, by the Diamond Rock-boring Company. The work was hampered by water flowing into the mine faster than it could be pumped out, and in 1873 the shareholders declined to advance any more money. The Directors decided to wind up the company, and create The Croesor Slate Company, to take over. However, the machinery was removed, and attempts were made to sell the quarry in April and July 1875. With so much development work, and little good quality rock, the undertaking was not economic. In 1868, the cost of producing slates was nine times greater than at Penrhyn Quarry, and whereas they produced 9,000 tons a month, Croesor only produced 226 tons.

In December 1875, the Croesor New Slate Company Ltd took over the workings, eight cottages for the quarrymen, the workshops, and the incline which connected the quarry to the Croesor Tramway, and hence to the slate wharves at Porthmadog. They had a working capital of £45,000, but despite the expertise of Thomas Williams, the new manager who has previously managed the Penrhyn quarry, the company failed. The date is uncertain, as Boyd quotes December 1882, while Richards quotes 1878.

Prior to the opening of the Croesor Tramway, slate was carried by horse and cart to Penrhyndeudraeth station on the Ffestiniog Railway. In order to improve the journey, a long straight road, which now forms part of the A4085, was built south from Garreg by the quarry company. When the Croesor Tramway opened in 1864, a long incline was built from the quarry to the valley floor, and carriage by railway reduced transport costs from 7s 10.5d (39p) per ton to 2s 6.5d (12.5p). The mill was constructed in the early 1860s, and was powered by a 28-foot (8.5 m) diameter water wheel which drove about 12 slate saws. In 1866, the mill was extended, to provide another 12 or 14 saws. Power came from another water wheel, constructed underground, and fed by the tailrace of the first wheel. It was 39 feet (12 m) in diameter, and backup power was provided by a 13 hp (9.7 kW) steam engine. The shafting for the machinery was under the floor, as was a tramway for trucks to remove the cutting waste. A sale notice dating from 1874 indicated that in addition to sawing tables, there were also planing tables, slate dressing machines, two 12 hp (8.9 kW) steam locomotives and stables. The locomotives were 0-4-0VB vertical-boilered tank engines with vertical cylinders, manufactured by De Winton of Caernarfon. One of them was later sold to the Coedmadoc Slate Company of Nantlle.

=== Late phase ===
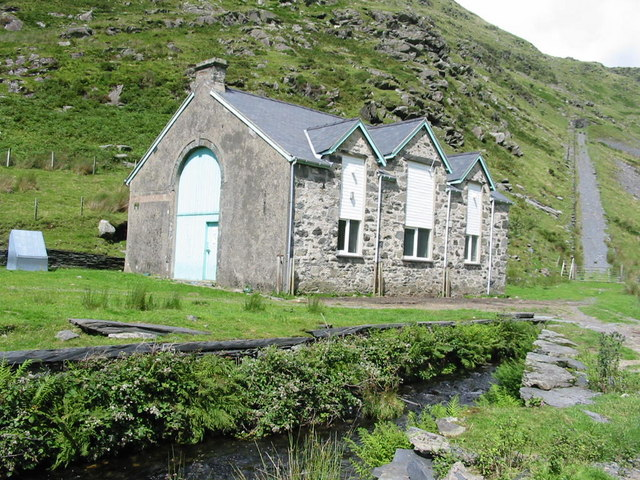
Kellow's Blaencwm power station, once again generating power after a period as an outdoor pursuits centre. The incline to the right led to two further inclines, one to Croesor and the other to Rhosydd.

Details of the next period are sketchy, although Boyd states that the quarry was bought by S Pope of Llanbedr on 7 July 1883, and became part of the Parc & Croesor Slate Quarries Company Ltd, which was formed on 21 August 1895. The amalgamation with the Park Quarry, which was located near the Garreg Hylldrem inclines further down the Croesor valley, was arranged by Moses Kellow, whose uncle, Joseph Kellow, had briefly been the agent and quarry engineer for the Conglog quarry in the 1870s. The quarry had been managed by Thomas Williams of Bryn, Croesor for many years, and Kellow had married Williams' daughter Nell in 1892. Williams died around 1895, and Kellow took over the management of the quarry, having had plans to reopen it for some years. Parc Quarry made slate ridging, and the amalgamation was made so that rather than supplying the ridging with slates from other quarries, he could supply it with slates from his own quarry.

Kellow was known as a "fearless innovator", and set about modernising the quarry operation. The first problem that he faced was that the quarry below the level of the main adit had filled with water in the 17 years that it had been closed. Twelve chambers were submerged, and there were two sumps each holding some 4.5 million imperial gallons (20 Ml) of water. Local opinion was that a new tunnel, at the level of the lowest chamber, would need to be cut, and a London-based engineer had calculated that pulsometer pumps could empty it in about six months. As the rails on the main incline to the lower chambers were still in place, Kellow mounted a large centrifugal pump on a platform, which he lowered down the rails as water levels fell. It could pump 340,000 imperial gallons (1.5 Ml) per hour, and he drained the entire quarry in around a week. His innovation also covered working practices. Traditionally, Welsh slate mines were worked by teams of four men, consisting of two rockmen, who worked in a chamber below ground, and two mill men, who processed the slate blocks produced by the rockmen. Kellow introduced a new system, in which two-man teams of rockmen supplied slabs to the mill, where independent two-man teams worked, who were allocated slabs by ballot. This enabled the mill to be run at full capacity most of the time, with productivity rising by 25 per cent in the first month after it was introduced. Initial resistance from the quarrymen was overcome as they saw their wages rising significantly.

Kellow introduced compressed air drills, which were fed by a small water-powered compressor located near the foot of the incline to the nearby Rhosydd quarry. He also decided to construct a low-level adit, and work began on it, using the new air drills. A section of incline was built, to be used to counterbalance the trucks removing the spoil, but the adit was not completed. The water wheels were supplemented by Pelton wheels, and Kellow, writing in 1911, described four high-pressure turbines, producing 500 hp (370 kW). Water to supply the turbines was obtained from two reservoirs, one located at 1,460 feet (450 m) above sea level and covering 12 acres (4.9 ha), and a second covering 5 acres (2.0 ha) at 1,650 feet (500 m). Water was also taken from a 6-acre (2.4 ha) natural lake at 1,750 feet (530 m).

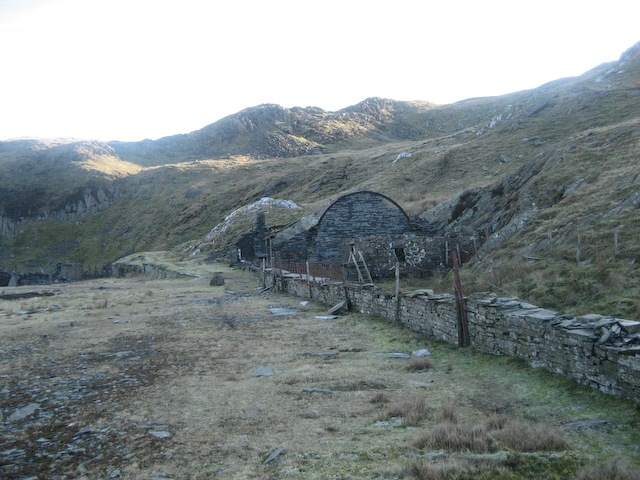
The quarry in 2007, showing the remains of the fan house by the main adit and the site of the mill.

=== Electrification ===
After initial experiments with electricity in the late 1890s, Kellow planned the electrification of the quarry in 1901. By utilising the reservoir in the Cwm Foel valley, located at 1,460 feet (450 m) above sea level, and siting the generating station near the foot of the incline up to the quarry, he obtained a head of 860 feet (260 m) to drive his large hydro-electric turbines. Standard British practice at the time was to use 550-volt direct current for such work, but Kellow thought this was too high for distribution underground, and the cost of cabling for a lower voltage system was prohibitive. He found references to a new system of three-phase alternating current, but was unable to find British manufacturers who thought it was sensible, or who would make equipment to work with it. He produced a full specification for a three-phase plant in 1902, and toured Europe, talking to electrical manufacturers, who he found more supportive of his plans. He bought the equipment from Kolben and Company of Prague. It consisted of a 250kVa alternator, which he would couple to a 375 hp pelton wheel impulse turbine. A separate 25 hp impulse turbine supplied the exciter circuit, providing good voltage regulation, and it provided enough spare power to light and heat his house. Power was generated at just below 3000 volts, and transformed down to 220 volts between phases at the point of use.

The quarry was lit by electricity, using 2000-candlepower arc lamps, and he installed reversible winches, which were driven by 10 hp (7.5 kW) motors. They could raise 3-ton blocks, when they were being loaded onto trucks, and had a high speed mode, which was used when the blocks were dragged across the floor. For the haulage of trucks along the main adit, he introduced a 30 hp (22 kW) mining locomotive, the first electric locomotive to work in Wales. It was a 4-wheel design, picking up power from an overhead wire, and is thought to have been built in the quarry workshops. The Pelton wheels were supplied by Gilbert Gilkes and Company Ltd of Kendal, as were the ones which supplemented the water wheels.

=== Innovation ===
Other innovations included a new type of planing machine which he invented, which worked between six and ten times faster than traditional designs. Removal of water form the mine was improved by the installation of centrifugal pumps, capable of pumping 400 imperial gallons (1,800 L) per minute. Productivity was improved by the replacement of hand-drills with another of Kellow's inventions. His Kellow drill used high pressure water, produced no dust, and could drill a 7.5-foot (2.3 m) hole in under two minutes, instead of the ten hours required when a hand-drill was used. At the time, percussive drills powered by compressed air were being introduced in many quarries, but Kellow disliked them because they were very noisy, created clouds of dust, and were uncomfortable to the men who had to use them for long periods. His drill was basically a twist drill, similar to those used to drill wood or metal. In order to hold it against the rock face, two small holes were drilled to a depth of 2.5 inches (6.4 cm), into which two rods on the drill were inserted, and jacked apart to secure it. The drill was powered by a small Pelton wheel, supplied with water at 500 psi (34 bar), equivalent to a head of 1,100 feet (340 m). He obtained a patent for the design in 1898, the year in which he introduced the drills to the quarry. The drills were still noisy, and discharged the spent water into the quarry, typically 400 imperial gallons (1,800 L) in the 90 seconds it took to drill a hole.

Kellow later collaborated with Gilbert Gilkes on improved designs for his drills, and Gilkes later became a director of the Kellow Rock Drill Syndicate Ltd, set up in 1908, but they parted company because Gilkes thought that Kellow was too much of a perfectionist, unwilling to listen to advice from an expert in the field of turbines. Kellow's next patent, obtained in 1906, included recycling of the water, which was fed through a 3-inch (7.6 cm) inner flexible pipe, running through the middle of a 5-inch (13 cm) outer pipe, through which the spent water was returned to the sump from which the drill was supplied. Despite the complexity of the hose, the unions which held lengths together were watertight under 900 psi (62 bar). The new design was also much quieter than the old. Next he redesigned the bit, which used a replaceable D-shaped cutter, making it much easier to manufacture than a twist-bit, and this was covered by a patent obtained in 1910. Some water was fed through the drill to lubricate and cool the cutting surfaces. Two further patents from 1914 covered an improved gearbox and a redesigned two-stage reaction turbine, and another in 1915 covered an improved feed cylinder. This supplied the forward thrust to the drill bit, typically 2 to 3 tons for drilling slate, although trials on granite had used up to 20 tons. No data is available for earlier drills, but for the later ones, the turbine ran at 5,000 rpm and the drill at 250 rpm.

The Kellow Rock Drill Syndicate converted the original slate mill, dating from 1861, into a workshop called Keldril Works, where the drills were made. It was about 55 by 45 feet (17 by 14 m), but burnt down between 1910 and 1912. The insurance company wrote off the machinery, as the roof had fallen onto it, but all of it was subsequently rescued from the wreckage. Some of it was moved to the old fitting shop, and some to the Blaencwm power station, where it continued to be used until the quarry closed in 1930.

=== Reuse for storage ===
Following the end of the Second World War, the quarry was operated by Cookes Explosive, a local firm based at Penrhyndeudraeth, who used its underground chambers to store explosives, mainly propellants. The adit was worked by three Ruston & Hornsby 4-wheeled diesel mechanical locomotives, originally built in 1939 and 1941, and obtained second-hand. Two had been scrapped or sold by 1955, and the date of disposal of the third is unknown. Several buildings were constructed in the marshalling area at the far end of the adit, and a massive haulage winch partially blocked access to the incline to the levels above. In 1971, the Central Electricity Generating Board (CEGB), operators of the Ffestiniog pumped storage power station, became aware of this use, and calculated that if there was an explosion underground, either of their two dams could be damaged. They therefore drained both reservoirs, and Cookes began removing about 250 tons of explosives per week, which were taken to Penrhyndeudraeth or by rail from Blaenau Ffestiniog railway station to various other ICI Nobel works in the United Kingdom.

Blaencwm power station continued in operation after the quarry closed, supplying electricity to the national grid until the 1950s, when it was closed. The dam on Llyn Cwm-y-foel was breached, much of the pipeline was removed, and the building became an outdoor pursuits centre. In 1999, National Power Hydro refurbished it as part of a £1 million project, which included the provision of a new underground pipeline from the reservoir, and underground cables to connect it to the national grid. It is capable of generating 500 kW, and the work was carried out as part of the government's renewable energy programme. The power station was formally opened by local MP Elfyn Llwyd on 26 November 1999.

In the early 1970s the quarry was purchased by the Ffestiniog Slate Company with a view to reopening it as a working slate mine. Planning permission for this was not granted and in the later 1970s most of the remaining mine infrastructure was removed for use in the Oakeley Quarry, also owned by the Ffestiniog Slate Company.

== Current conditions ==
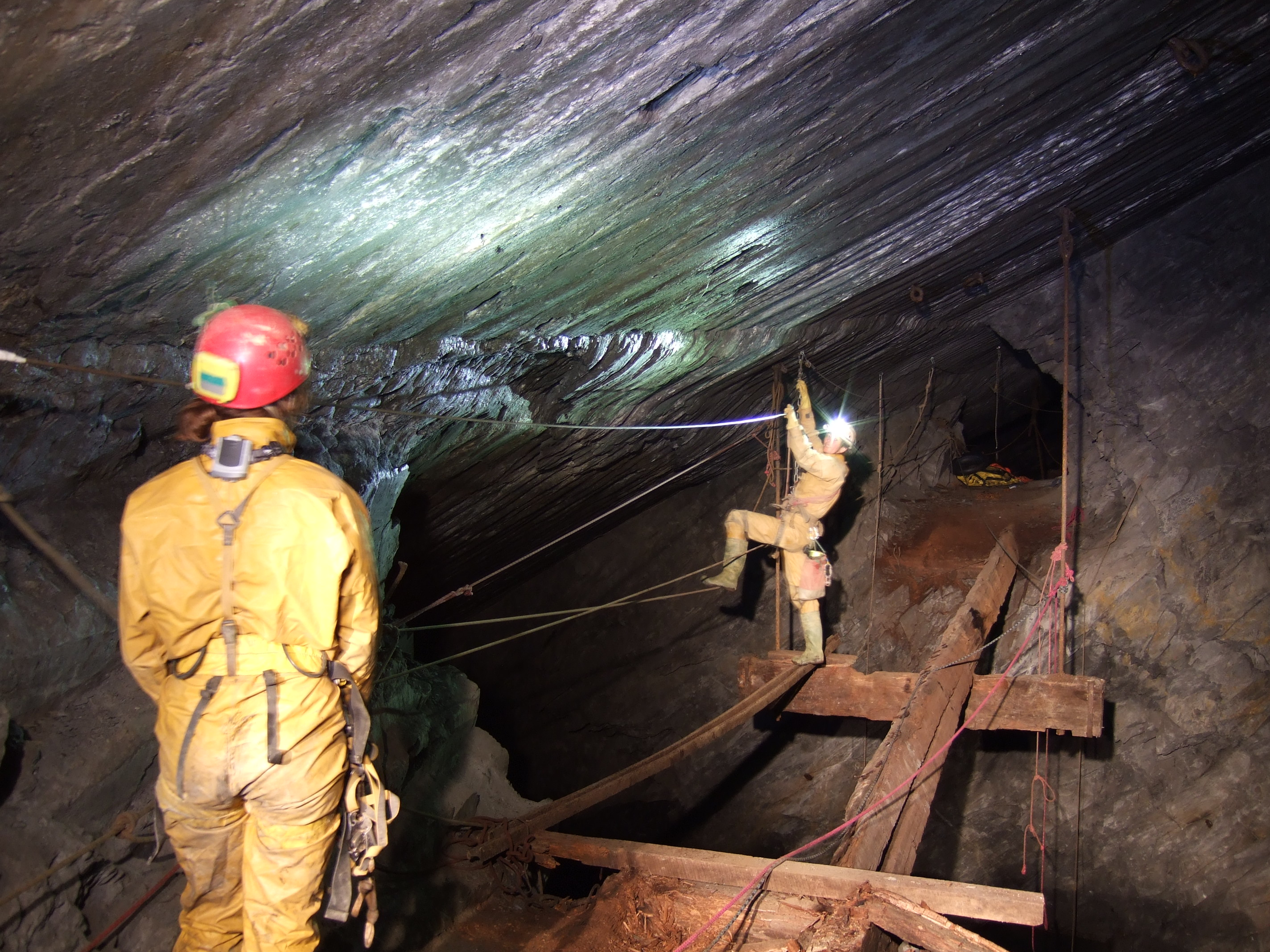
Final and most awkward crossing in the Croesor to Rhosydd through trip

Croesor is connected to the nearby Rhosydd quarry by a tunnel that was built to aid surveying and settle boundary disputes. Apart from Chamber 1 East, a huge chamber in which the roof has collapsed, most of the accessible mine is in reasonable condition. Below the adit level, the mine is flooded and inaccessible. In spite of a series of collapses, particularly in the Rhosydd quarry, an underground journey from Croesor to Rhosydd is still possible and is considered to be a classic trip for mine explorers. It is known as the Croesor–Rhosydd Through Trip. Fixed ropes, home-made suspension bridges, zip wires, and inflatable boats have been installed which make it possible to complete the journey in comfort although not necessarily in safety.

== Geology ==
The Ffestiniog region contains five major slate veins, which are on top of a thick layer of feldspathic porphyry, called the "Glanypwll Trap". The veins are the New or Deep Vein, the Old Vein, the Small Vein, the Back Vein and the North Vein. At Croesor, the Old Vein is accessible, and dips downwards at about 27 degrees. It is around 120 feet (37 m) wide, at right angles to the bedding plane, and over 330 feet (100 m) horizontally.

== Description ==
The main adit was relatively large, and ran for 440 yards (400 m) to reach an underground marshalling area. A vertical shaft, cut downwards through the rock above, enters the adit midway along its length. The quarry was worked on seven floors, designated as D Up, C Up, B Up, A, B Down, C Down and D Down, working from top to bottom, with floor A at the same level as the main adit. Floors B Up to D Up were connected by an incline that ascended from level A. A second incline descended to floors B Down and C Down, with a separate incline connecting floors C and D Down. Since closure, the chambers below level A, for which there is no natural drainage, have gradually flooded, and the water level has reached the level of the main adit. When the chambers were used for the storage of explosives, a large amount of masonry was installed to house a haulage winch, and this makes it difficult to access the incline to the upper floors.

=== Unusual Features ===
Croesor is notable amongst Welsh slate quarries for being almost entirely underground, with no significant surface workings. It was rare in its extensive use of forced air ventilation instead of the more common natural ventilation used in most slate mines. It also generated relatively small external waste tips compared with the volume of finished slates produced; this was largely achieved by back-filling underground chambers with waste once they were exhausted.

== Operation ==
Output in the early years was quite low, but following Kellow's innovations, was between 5,000 and 6,000 tons per year but then declined until the quarry closed. At its peak, around 300 men were employed there, of whom some 70 stayed in barracks. Forced ventilation was used, and a large fan house was constructed near the entrance to the adit. It housed a Guibal fan, although described by Richards as a Guiblas fan, and experiments were also carried out with water blast ventilation, using a vertical shaft between the chambers and the hillside. The Guibal fan was patented in Belgium by Guibal in 1862, and its spiral case which surrounded the fan blades made it much superior to previous open-fan designs. Such fans were used extensively for mine ventilation throughout Britain.

== Transport ==
The quarry's produce were distributed from Porthmadog (sometimes anglisised as Portmadoc), a harbour on the Glaslyn Estuary. In 1865, the Croesor Tramway was built which connected various quarries in the Cwm Croesor (including the Croesor quarry) to Portmadoc, making transport easier.

== Bibliography ==
- Boyd, James (1972). Narrow Gauge Railways in South Caernarvonshire. Oakwood Press.
- Bradley, V J; Hindley, P, eds. (1968). Industrial and Independent Locomotives and Railways of North Wales. Birmingham Locomotive Club.
- FRS (1971). "Gwynedd Topics". Ffestiniog Railway Magazine (54: Autumn). Ffestiniog Railway Society.
- Hancock, Celia (2006). Conglog Slate Quarry. Adit Publications. ISBN 978-0-9522979-4-9.
- Kellow, Moses (February 1911). The Park and Croesor Quarries. The Slate Trade Gazette.
- Kellow, Moses (2015). Woodhead, Cathy (ed.). The Autobiography of the Croesor Quarry Manager. Delfryn Publications. ISBN 978-0-9561469-9-1.
- Lindsay, Jean (1974). A History of the North Wales Slate Industry. David and Charles. ISBN 978-0-7153-6265-5.
- Moulding, Miles (2 July 2006). Croesor Rhosydd - The Through Trip (PDF). Archived from the original (PDF) on 7 February 2012.
- Richards, Alun John (1991). A Gazeteer of the Welsh Slate Industry. Gwasg Carreg Gwalch. ISBN 978-0-86381-196-8.
- Richards, Alun John (1999). The Slate Regions of North and Mid Wales. Gwasg Carreg Gwalch. ISBN 978-0-86381-552-2.
- Wallace, Anthony F C (1988). St. Clair: Nineteenth-Century Coal Town's Experience with a Disaster-Prone Industry. Cornell University Press. ISBN 978-0-8014-9900-5.
- Weaver, Rodney (August 1978). The Kellow Drill (PDF). Adit Now.
