= Rhosydd quarry =

Disused slate mine in North Wales

Rhosydd
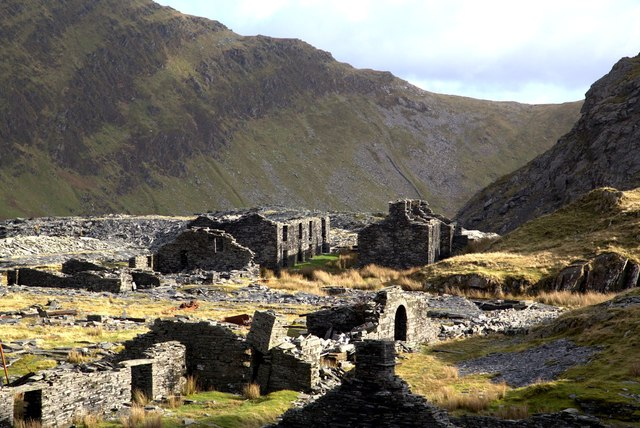
- The abandoned mill buildings and barracks adjacent the 9 Adit portal.

- Location in Gwynedd
- Location: Wales, Gwynedd, UK; 52.9966°N 3.9905°W grid reference SH665462
- Products: Slate
- Type: Quarry
- Discovered: 1830s
- Opened: 1853
- Active: 1853-1873; 1874-1914; 1919-1930
- Closed: 1930

Rhosydd quarry was a slate quarry in the Moelwyn mountains, northeast of Porthmadog in North Wales.

Small-scale working of the site began in the 1830s, but was hampered by the remote location, and the lack of a transport system to carry the slates to markets. The Rhosydd Slate Company was formed in 1853, and became a limited company in 1856. Transport was made more difficult by the attitude of the Cwmorthin quarry, through whose land the most obvious route to the Ffestiniog Railway ran. A solution was found in 1864, with the opening of the Croesor Tramway, to which the quarry was connected by one of the longest single-pitch cable-hauled inclines in Wales. Huge amounts of money were spent on development work, and the company, unable to make adequate returns, went into voluntary liquidation in 1873.

The quarry was auctioned in 1874, and the New Rhosydd Slate Quarry Company Ltd. was formed. Unlike its predecessor, the directors were all Welsh, and three-quarters of the shareholders were also from the local area. The quarry prospered for a while, but then profitability declined, and in 1900, a large section of the underground workings collapsed. The job of opening up new areas was spearheaded by Evan Jones, who nearly succeeded, but was hampered by a slump in the slate industry and the onset of the First World War, when the quarry was "non-essential" and was mothballed. It reopened in 1919, but was in a poor financial position, and was bought by members of the Colman family, better known for producing mustard. They kept it running until 1930, but failed to find markets for the finished product. It was mothballed until 1947, when it was sold, but new plans to reopen it failed, and the pumps were turned off in 1948, after scrapmen had removed much of the machinery.

Of the five slate veins in the region of Blaenau Ffestiniog, most of Rhosydd's output was extracted from the Old Vein. The workings started at the West Twll, where the rock outcropped, but the quarry soon developed into underground workings. A series of adits were constructed, to provide access as the mine got deeper, with the lowest at level 9. Trucks moved along this adit by attaching them to an endless chain, driven by a waterwheel. The mine eventually reached level 14, with rock raised by an internal incline to the level 9 adit. At its peak the quarry was one of the largest underground workings outside of Blaenau Ffestiniog, with 170 chambers.

== History ==
Slate was discovered in the vicinity of Rhosydd in the early 1830s. Two men from Croesor found it and assumed that it was on the estate of Croesor Fawr. They therefore asked the owner, William Turner, for a take-note, which would allow them to quarry the rock. It was also found by Meredydd Jones of Maenofferen, but he assumed that it was on the Cwmorthin Ucha estate, which was owned by William Ormsby Gore, and so he approached Ormsby Gore's agent for a take-note. As the boundary between the two estates was not clearly defined in this region, a court case followed in 1833, to decide where the boundary should be. The result was that Rhosydd was part of the Cwmorthin Ucha estate, and the Ormsby Gores issued take-notes and later leases. Small scale working began, but the site was not easily accessible, as the workings were some 1,850 feet (560 m) above sea level, in an area of boggy moorland. A Mr Mathews from Aberystwyth obtained a lease, and created the first adit, but appears to have done little more. Another lease was issued to two speculators in 1850, but it was not taken up.

In 1852, Edward Barker obtained a take-note, which he then transferred to a partnership. Barker was the son of Ormsby Gore's agent, while the partnership consisted of a surgeon called William Taylor, a warehouseman called John Pearce, both from London, and John Harper, who was from Porthmadog. Harper briefly acted as managing director, but was soon replaced by a naval captain called Richard Oliver. The agent or general manager was Thomas Jones, who had assisted Barker in his search for slate. On 27 June 1853, the partnership became the Rhosydd Slate Company, which negotiated the conversion of the take-note into a lease in September. Finished slates were carried by the Ffestiniog Railway in 1854, and in 1855 some Rhosydd slates were shipped from Porthmadog. In the following year, the Joint Stock Companies Act 1856 was passed by parliament, and the quarrying company became the Rhosydd Slate Company Ltd on 7 November, under the terms of that act.

Finished slates were transported by pack horse when quarrying began. The route taken probably followed a well-built path that starts near the highest workings and runs between the peak of Moelwyn Mawr to its west and Llyn Stwlan to its east, before turning to the west and descending Cwm Maesgwm to reach the Maentwrog to Aberglaslyn turnpike road. As the quarry developed, and workings were opened up to the north, a more obvious route was that down Cwm Orthin to the east, which reached the Ffestiniog Railway at Tanygrisiau. However, Cwmorthin objected, and restricted the use of this route by prohibiting the use of carts, which they enforced by erecting a gate at Ty Gwyn, about 25 yards (23 m) above the Ffestiniog Railway. Wheeled carts would have been difficult to control, because of the steep gradients, and sledges may have been used. These were known as "car llusg" in Welsh, which was often translated as "cart".

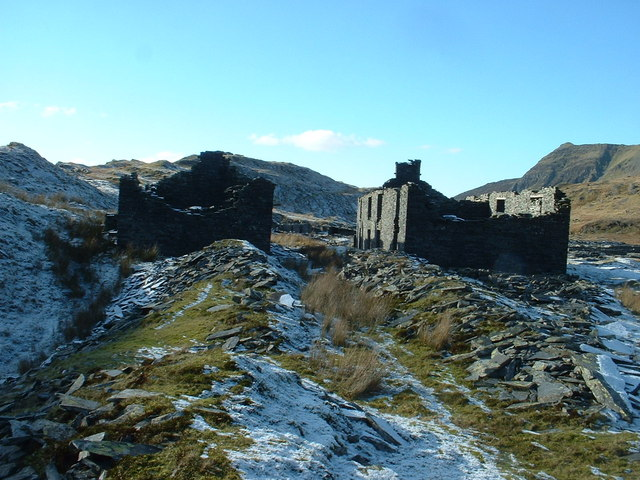
The derelict barracks. Behind them is the level 9 adit.

The company was created with a nominal capital of £50,000, and all the shares had been issued by 1862. Most of the money came from London, with some from Bath, but very little from local sources. To raise more money, £30,000 in debentures were then issued. A new lease was obtained in October 1859, on terms which were favourable compared to many other quarries in the area; royalties of two shillings (10p) per ton were payable, whereas five shillings (25p) was more common. Transportation improved in 1864, with the opening of the Croesor Tramway. Construction began in 1862 without an Act of Parliament, by obtaining wayleaves for the route from Porthmadog to the foot of the first incline at Garreg Hylldrem. Beyond there, it was effectively a private tramway, as it was built on land leased to the owners of various quarries which it served. There were two inclines at Garreg Hylldrem, and a third at Blaencwm. After a short level section, the tramway divided, with one branch ascending a large incline to the Croesor quarry, and another ascending to the Rhosydd exit tramway. Both inclines descended by around 750 feet (230 m) and were the two highest single-pitch inclines in Wales. A deed of mutual covenant was signed on 1 October 1863 by the Rhosydd Slate Company Ltd and Hugh Beaver Roberts, the builder and owner of the Croesor Tramway, to formalise the building of the incline and connecting tramway. It also set the tolls for use of the incline at 2d (0.8p) per ton, reducing to 1d.

By this time, slate was being worked on five levels, and there were two adits, one of 550 yards (500 m), with a second of 700 yards (640 m). The first four wagons loaded with a total of 7.4 tons of slates descended the incline on 1 August 1864, the day on which the Croesor Tramway officially opened. The first month was exceptional, with the quarry sending 284 tons of slates to Porthmadog, after which it levelled out at around 200 tons per month. Coal traffic in the reverse direction developed, some of it for the quarry and some for the quarrymen's barracks. A proposed restructuring of the company in 1865 to raise additional capital did not occur, but the capital of the original company was increased to £125,000 in the following year. In March 1871, the lease was renewed for a further 42 years, but the company was soon in difficulties. Adequate returns could not be made on the large amount of money sunk into development, and on 27 June 1873, it went into voluntary liquidation.

=== Second phase ===
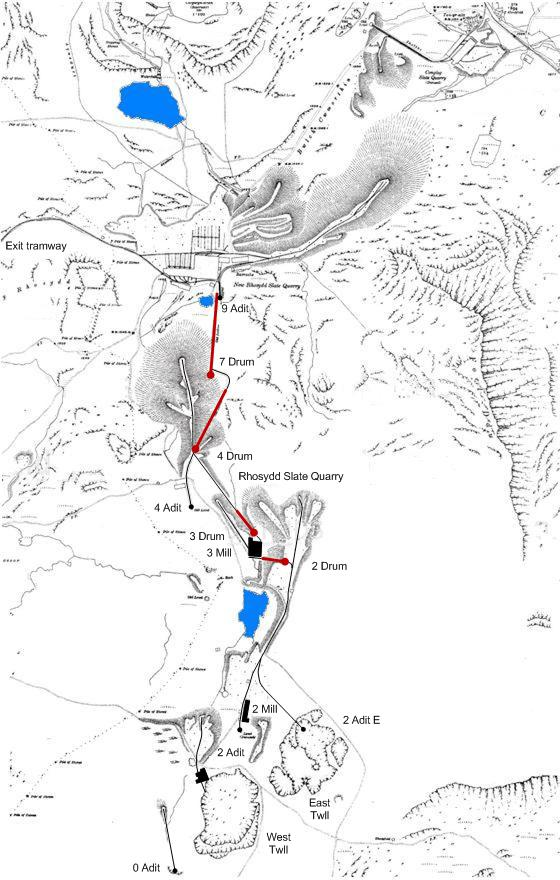
Map showing the quarry in 1919, with overlays to show historic tramways, adits and inclines, not all of which were present at any one time

A sale notice produced in 1874 in preparation for an auction of the quarry and plant claimed that development work at Rhosydd had cost £150,000. The auction took place in Manchester on 27 June 1874, and the quarry was sold for just £29,500. The buyers created the New Rhosydd Slate Quarry Company Ltd on 10 October, and whereas the previous company had been dominated by Englishmen, three-quarters of the initial shares in the new company were bought by local people, from Ffestiniog, Porthmadog and the surrounding area. There were bankers, doctors, magistrates, merchants, quarry agents, solicitors and "gentlemen". The new company set its authorised capital at £80,000, consisting of 1,600 shares valued at £50 each, but only £44,000 was subscribed. Richard Hughes of Ynystowyn, Porthmadog acted as secretary until 1921, and the company office was in Ynystowyn. All of the directors were Welshmen, and remained so for the life of the quarry. Good dividends were paid between 1876 and 1889, but then profitability declined. In 1900, a large section of the underground workings collapsed, in what was known as the "great fall". The company now had to create a new quarry, with the only finance coming from their revenue account. Evan Jones took on the job of opening up new workings in 1906, when the previous agent, William W Morris, was retired, having shown that he was unable to complete such a task.

Jones largely succeeded in carrying out this brief, as he was supported by three board members with a working knowledge of mining. The first was Morris, who had been given a seat on the board when he was retired; the second was also the agent at Llechwedd, another major quarry in Blaenau Ffestiniog; and the third owned several quarries near Harlech. Complete success was thwarted by a serious slump in the slate trade in the period leading up the First World War, and then by the war itself. The quarry was shut down in 1914, as slate quarrying was declared to be a "non-essential industry", although two men were retained to maintain it, and it reopened when the war had finished, in 1919. However, company finances were in a poor state, and when the directors received an offer to purchase the quarry, the company went into voluntary liquidation on 12 July 1921, eleven days after its assets had been sold for £23,798. It was bought by two members of the Colman family, better known for producing the Colman's brand of mustard. They had also bought the Groesyddwyafon quarry in 1920, and continued to work both much as before, but struggled to find markets for the product, and Rhosydd closed on 13 September 1930. As during the First World War, two caretakers were retained, and the pumps continued to operate, in the hope that it could be reopened.

Captain John S Matthews, the owner of the Craig Ddu and Manod quarries, bought the quarry in December 1947, together with the Croesor Quarry and the Conglog quarry, with a view to reopening all three, but his plans failed, and the pumps were turned off in 1948. The firm of W O Williams from Harlech removed the equipment for scrap, and the lease was terminated on 23 May 1948. Between 1949 and 1954, a few slatemakers from Llanberis worked on the site, making roofing slates from the slabs which had been used to build the walls of the mill. The quarry was purchased by McAlpine in the 1990s, but quarrying was not resumed.

== Geology ==
Around Blaenau Ffestiniog, there are five veins of slate, separated from one another by bands of poor-quality slate which is of no use or by other intrusive rock. They are called the North, Back, Narrow, Old and New veins, with the North Vein being nearest to the surface. The veins dip down towards the north at an angle of between 20 and 29 degrees. Apart from small-scale trials on other veins, nearly all of the slate extracted at Rhosydd was from the Old Vein, which is about 108 feet (33 m) thick at this point.

== Description ==
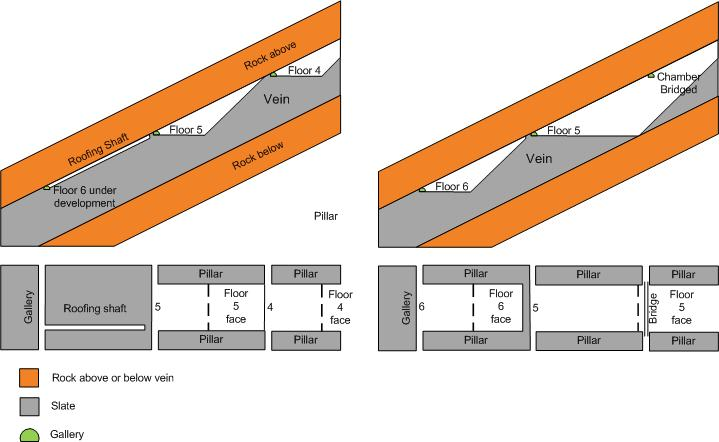
Method of quarrying slate at Rhosydd and other quarries in the Blaenau Ffestiniog region

Where the rock outcrops, opencast working was possible, and the West Twll workings show that this approach was initially used, but it soon became uneconomical to remove the rock above the slate, and the quarry became a mine. Floors were formed at vertical intervals of about 40 feet (12 m), first in the opencase section, and then underground. Once below ground, an incline was cut just below the hard rock above the vein. From this, horizontal galleries or floors were cut, which formed the starting points for chambers. Each chamber was begun by miners, who cut a roofing shaft, which they then widened and made a trench on one side, to allow the rockmen to free blocks of slate. The chambers varied in width, as did the pillars left between them to support the roof, but on average, chambers were 50 feet (15 m) wide, and pillars were 30 feet (9.1 m) wide. Careful alignment was necessary, to ensure that the pillars on one floor were above the pillars on the floor below, so that a continuous wall of slate supported the rocks above.

The earliest workings were at a height of 1,893 feet (577 m) above sea level, and is marked by the collapsed 0 Adit. The West Twll was started in the 1840s as an opencast quarry, and by 1853 was four floors deep. Adits were cut at levels 1, 2 and 4, which were used to remove the rock and for drainage. The adit on floor 1 was 140 feet (43 m) long in 1855, but was destroyed as the West Twll was enlarged. That on floor 2 was originally 370 feet (110 m) long, but only 193 feet (59 m) was left by the time enlargement of the West Twll ceased. The floor 4 adit was 1,501 feet (458 m) long, and was constructed from three faces, created by digging two vertical shafts to enable the work to proceed faster. Work began on it in February 1857, and it was completed in late 1859. The East Twll was started at around this time, and had a short adit at level 2. This second quarry followed the Narrow Vein down to level 3.

The level 9 adit was the longest built at Rhosydd, measuring 2,221 feet (677 m) from the mouth to the haulage system at the inner end. It had a gradient of 1 in 86 to aid drainage, and took eight years to complete, being completed in 1870 or 1871. During its construction, an internal incline was built downwards from floor 5, so that rock from higher levels could be lowered down to the mine exit. Trucks were moved along the adit by attaching them to an endless rope, which was driven by a 24-foot (7.3 m) diameter pitchback water wheel located near the mouth of the adit. They were marshalled into rakes of about 12 wagons, with a gripper truck or megryn at both ends. A screw handle was used to attach the front megryn to the rope, both on the line of full trucks in the mine and on empty ones outside the adit. The rope was then set in motion, and when the couplings between the trucks were tight, the gripper on the back megryn was applied. When they reached the far end, the grippers were released, as the water wheel took some time to stop. A similar system was used on the Glasgow Subway when it first opened. For most of its length, there were only three rails in the adit, the centre one being shared by both tracks. They fanned out into double tracks at both ends, and for 490 feet (150 m) in the middle, so that trucks moving in opposite directions could pass one another. Communication between the operators at either end was by a bell system.

The incline from floor 5 to floor 9 was 309 feet (94 m) long, with a gradient of 1 in 1.97 at the top and 1 in 2.15 at the bottom. It follows the roof of the vein, and the change in slope is caused by the dip of the vein changing. A cradle running on standard gauge tracks runs up and down the incline. It was counterbalanced by a weighted truck running on 2 ft 8 in (813 mm) gauge tracks, running down the centre of the incline. The counterbalance passed under the main cradle, which carried trucks on three transverse tracks, at the midway point. At the bottom of the incline, the cradle descended into a pit, to that its top was level with the floor, to enable the loaded trucks to be off-loaded easily. Sometime after the construction of this incline, a similar one was built between floors 3 and 6 in the western part of the mine. It sloped down at 1 in 1.26, and was 314 feet (96 m) long. From about 1890, the mine began to be extended below level 9, for which a new incline was needed. It ran from near the foot of the 5/9 incline, and descended at a gradient of 1 in 2.48 for a distance of about 436 feet (133 m) to reach floor 14. It was probably powered by a counterbalance system, since another incline was constructed from the head of the 9/14 incline up to floor 6. It was too small for it to have housed a transporter truck, but could easily have been used by a balancing truck, which would have been filled with water at floor 6 to make it heavy enough to raise the transporter on the 9/14 incline, and emptied for movement in the reverse direction. No details of it have survived, and power was provided by two Pelton wheels on floor 9 from 1899, which were supplied with water from the abandoned adit on floor 4.

== Output ==
By 1883 the quarry had become one of the largest underground workings in Wales outside of Blaenau Ffestiniog, with 170 chambers and shipping 5,616 tons of finished slate. The peak year was in 1885, when 6,484 tons of finished slates was produced by the 207 men who worked at Rhosydd. Around 222,000 tons of slate was produced during its life, and the waste tips contain some 2.5 million tons of rock. Although productivity was somewhat lower than the main quarries in Blaenau Ffestiniog, and it appears that the slates did not split quite as well, Rhosydd won a prize at the International Exhibition held in 1862, and promotional material indicated that its slates were used to roof the Royal Mint, Chatham Dockyard, buildings on the Blenheim Estate, Morris Motors' Oxford car works and the bus garage at Barking.
