= Croesor =

Village in Gwynedd, Wales

Coordinates: 52.981°N 4.040°W

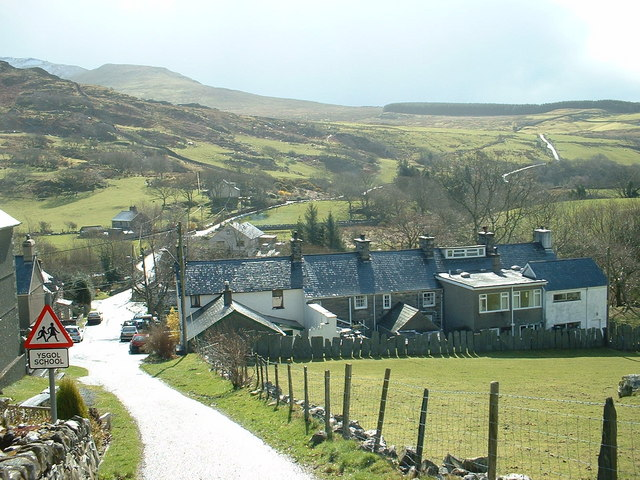
- View of Croesor village

- Location within Gwynedd
- OS grid reference: SH631446
- Community: Llanfrothen
- Principal area: Gwynedd
- Country: Wales
- Sovereign state: United Kingdom
- Post town: PENRHYNDEUDRAETH
- Postcode district: LL48
- Dialling code: 01766
- Police: North Wales
- Fire: North Wales
- Ambulance: Welsh
- UK Parliament: Dwyfor Meirionnydd
- Senedd Cymru – Welsh Parliament: Dwyfor Meirionnydd

Croesor is a small village in Gwynedd, Wales, located at the foot of Cnicht, in Cwm Croesor, in the community of Llanfrothen. The Croesor Tramway travelled along the bed of the cwm, before rising steeply to Bwlch Rhosydd via Croesor Incline.

To the south of the village is the site of Parc, which was the ancient estate of the Anwyl Family, with a claim to be the direct descendants in the male line of Owain Gwynedd, prince of Gwynedd.

The primary language used is Welsh

The Snowdonia Slate Trail between Beddgelert and Tanygrisiau passes through the village

== Famous residents ==
The author Patrick O'Brian and his wife Mary were residents of this village from 1945 to 1949, living first at the cottage Fron Wen and later at a larger house Moelwyn Bank.

In the early 1960s, the author Philip O'Connor spent several years in Croesor, which served as the basis for Living In Croesor (1962), an account of the village and its people.

Novelist, playwright, and poet Richard A.W. Hughes lived at Parc, in the vicinity of Croesor, beginning in 1934 and continuing into the Second World War. Hughes sheltered evacuee children there and collected the stories they told together.

== See also ==
- Croesor Quarry
