= List of schools in Gwynedd =

This is a list of schools in Gwynedd in Wales.

== Primary schools ==
- Ysgol Abercaseg (Babanod)
- Ysgol Babanod Morfa Nefyn
- Ysgol Baladeulyn
- Ysgol Beddgelert
- Ysgol Bethel
- Ysgol Bodfeurig
- Ysgol Bontnewydd
- Ysgol Bro Cynfal
- Ysgol Bro Hedd Wyn
- Ysgol Bro Lleu
- Ysgol Bro Llifon
- Ysgol Bro Plenydd
- Ysgol Bro Tryweryn
- Ysgol Brynaerau
- Ysgol Cae Top
- Ysgol Cefn Coch
- Ysgol Craig y Deryn
- Ysgol Crud-Y-Werin
- Ysgol Cymerau
- Ysgol Dolbadarn
- Ysgol Edmwnd Prys
- Ysgol Eifion Wyn
- Ysgol Ein Harglwyddes
- Ysgol Ffridd Y Llyn
- Ysgol Foel Gron
- Ysgol Glancegin
- Ysgol Gwaun Gyfni
- Ysgol Gymraeg Y Garnedd
- Ysgol Gymuned Penisarwaun
- Ysgol Gynradd Abererch
- Ysgol Gynradd Borth-Y-Gest
- Ysgol Gynradd Chwilog
- Ysgol Gynradd Dyffryn Ardudwy
- Ysgol Gynradd Dyffryn Dulas
- Ysgol Gynradd Edern
- Ysgol Gynradd Garndolbenmaen
- Ysgol Gynradd Llanbedr
- Ysgol Gynradd Llanbedrog
- Ysgol Gynradd Llandwrog
- Ysgol Gynradd Llangybi
- Ysgol Gynradd Llanllyfni
- Ysgol Gynradd Llanystumdwy
- Ysgol Gynradd Maesincla
- Ysgol Gynradd Nebo
- Ysgol Gynradd Nefyn
- Ysgol Gynradd Pennal
- Ysgol Gynradd Pentreuchaf
- Ysgol Gynradd Penybryn
- Ysgol Gynradd Rhosgadfan
- Ysgol Gynradd Rhostryfan
- Ysgol Gynradd Talysarn
- Ysgol Gynradd Tanygrisiau
- Ysgol Gynradd Tudweiliog
- Ysgol Hirael
- Ysgol Llandygai
- Ysgol Llanelltyd
- Ysgol Llanllechid
- Ysgol Llanrug
- Ysgol Maenofferen
- Ysgol Manod
- Ysgol O M Edwards
- Ysgol Penybryn
- Ysgol Pont Y Gof
- Ysgol Rhiwlas
- Ysgol Santes Helen
- Ysgol Sarn Bach
- Ysgol Talsarnau
- Ysgol Tanycastell
- Ysgol Treferthyr
- Ysgol Tregarth
- Ysgol Waunfawr
- Ysgol Y Faenol
- Ysgol Y Felinheli
- Ysgol Y Garreg
- Ysgol Y Gelli
- Ysgol Y Gorlan
- Ysgol y Traeth
- Ysgol Yr Eifl
- Ysgol Yr Hendre

== Secondary schools ==
- Ysgol Friars
- Ysgol Ardudwy
- Ysgol Botwnnog
- Ysgol Brynrefail
- Ysgol Dyffryn Nantlle
- Ysgol Dyffryn Ogwen
- Ysgol Eifionydd
- Ysgol Glan y Môr
- Ysgol Syr Hugh Owen
- Ysgol Tryfan
- Ysgol Uwchradd Tywyn
- Ysgol y Moelwyn

== Independent Schools ==
- St Gerards School

== All-through schools ==
- Ysgol Bro Idris
- Ysgol Godre'r Berwyn

== Special schools ==
- Ysgol Hafod Lon
- Ysgol Pendalar

== Further education colleges ==
- Coleg Harlech
- Coleg Meirion-Dwyfor
- Coleg Menai
- MPCT Bangor Farrar Road
