= Former Vicarage, Blaenau Ffestiniog =

Former Vicarage
- Yr Hen Ficerdy
- Location within Wales

General information
- Status: Completed
- Location: Blaenau Ffestiniog, Gwynedd, Wales
- Coordinates: 52.995403°N 3.940630°W

Website
- Cadw

References
- Cadw 726

The former vicarage is a Grade II listed building opposite St. David's Church in Blaenau Ffestiniog, Gwynedd. It is set behind spear head railings and build to serve the St Davids church. The building was extended in the late 19th century.

The listing mentions that the property (number 16851; reference 44/H/13(2)) is "On the street line opposite St. David's Church and stepped-up from and adjoining Craigbach 3; set behind contemporary spearheaded railings."
