= Old Market Hall, Blaenau Ffestiniog =

Municipal Building in Blaenau Ffestiniog, Wales

Old Market Hall
- Hen Neuadd y Farchnad Blaenau Ffestiniog (Welsh)
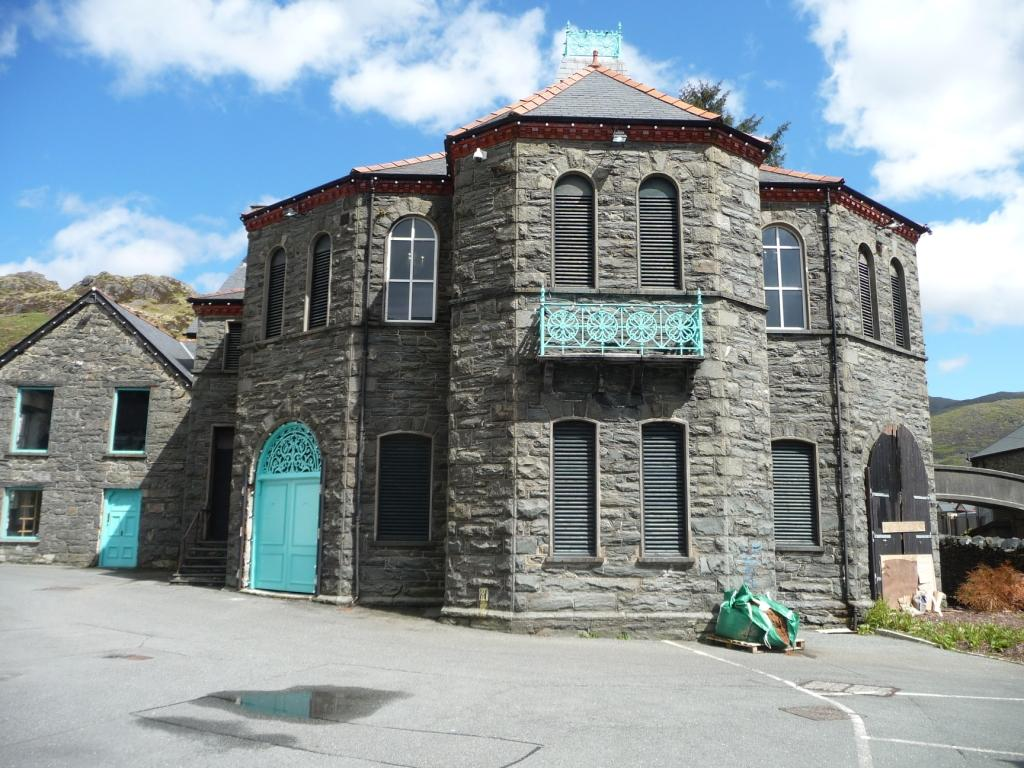
- Old Market Hall

- Shown in Gwynedd
- 52.9949°N 3.9415°W
- Location: Market Place, Blaenau Ffestiniog

History
- Built: 1864

Site notes
- Architect: Owen Morris
- Architectural style: Italianate style

Listed Building – Grade II
- Official name: Old Market Hall
- Designated: 14 June 2021
- Reference no.: 70483

The Old Market Hall (Welsh: Hen Neuadd y Farchnad Blaenau Ffestiniog) is a municipal building in the Market Place, Blaenau Ffestiniog, Gwynedd, Wales. The structure, which also served as the Town Hall (Welsh: Neuadd y Dref Blaenau Ffestiniog), is a Grade II listed building.

== History ==
In the mid-19th century, following significant population growth largely associated with the slate quarrying industry, civic officials decided to commission a market hall. The site they selected, which was at the west end of the town and bordered by the Ffestiniog Railway Line to the south, was donated by Mary Oakley of Plas Tan y Bwlch, whose family were major employers in the local slate quarrying industry. Construction work on the new building started in 1861. It was designed by Owen Morris of Porthmadog, built by a local builder, Owen Roberts, in coursed rubble and was completed in 1864.

When a parliamentary bill to expand the Ffestiniog Railway was being considered by the House of Lords in 1869, a meeting was convened in the market hall at which there were strong objections from local quarry owners on account of the high tolls being charged by the railway company for transporting the slate, the large profits being reported and the high dividends being declared.

The original building was a two-storey structure which formed the northern range of the current complex. However, in the early 1880s, the building was substantially extended to the south creating a much larger structure. This enlarged structure involved a symmetrical and polygonal main frontage projecting forward to the west. The central bay featured a further, smaller, polygonal structure, which itself incorporated a pair of segmental openings on the ground floor, and a cast iron balcony supported by brackets and a pair of round headed openings on the first floor. The flanking bays of the main polygon featured segmental openings on the ground floor and round headed windows on the first floor, and the bays beyond that, which were canted, featured archways on the ground floor and pairs of round headed openings on the first floor. At roof level there was a modillioned cornice and a slate roof. Internally, the principal rooms were the market hall on the ground floor and the assembly room, which featured a sprung wooden floor, a proscenium arch and a vaulted ceiling, on the first floor.

The future Prime Minsider, David Lloyd George, made a speech in the assembly room while campaigning for the Liberal Party in the 1885 election; he spoke in support of Joseph Chamberlain's "unauthorised programme" or "radical programme" of reforms for rural labourers, offering to make smallholdings available to them, using the slogan "three acres and a cow". During the First World War and the Second World War, the building was requisitioned for the production of uniforms.

Following the decline in the slate industry in Wales in the mid-20th century, the building was converted into a factory and then fell vacant in around 1970. In 2000, a local developer, Menter y Moelwyn, submitted plans to convert the structure into a recording studio, bingo hall and theatre but was unable to secure funding. Then, in 2009, another developer, Jacob Slevin, submitted plans to develop to convert it into an adventure sports centre and tourist information centre, but subsequently decided to put it up for sale. After that, in 2019, a third developer, Mossley Hill Investments, submitted plans to convert it into apartments, but encountered significant local opposition. Subsequently, the building continued to deteriorate and was added to Cadw's national heritage list in June 2021.
