= Slate =

Metamorphic rock

- Metamorphic rock
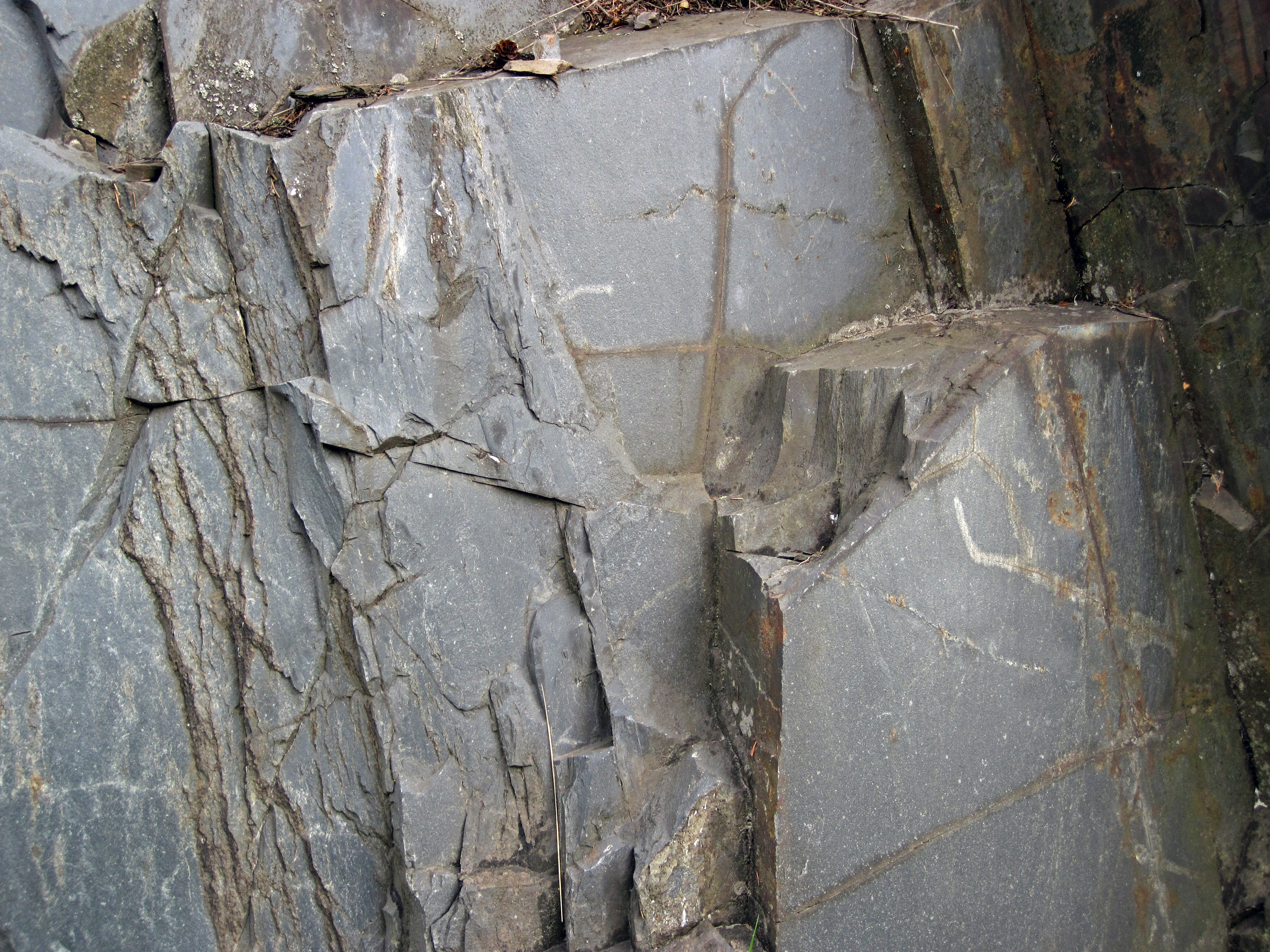
- Slate of the Knife Lake Formation in Minnesota

Composition
- Primary: quartz, muscovite/illite
- Secondary: biotite, chlorite, hematite, pyrite Specific gravity: 2.7 – 2.8, 2.9

Slate is a fine-grained, foliated, homogeneous, metamorphic rock derived from an original shale-type sedimentary rock composed of clay or volcanic ash through low-grade, regional metamorphism. It is the finest-grained foliated metamorphic rock. Foliation may not correspond to the original sedimentary layering, but instead is in planes perpendicular to the direction of metamorphic compression.

The foliation in slate, called "slaty cleavage", is caused by strong compression in which fine-grained clay forms flakes to regrow in planes perpendicular to the compression. When expertly "cut" by striking parallel to the foliation with a specialized tool in the quarry, many slates display a property called fissility, forming smooth, flat sheets of stone which have long been used for roofing, floor tiles, and billiard tables. Slate is frequently grey in color, especially when seen en masse covering roofs. However, slate occurs in a variety of colors even from a single locality; for example, slate from North Wales can be found in many shades of grey, from pale to dark, and may also be purple, green, or cyan. Slate is not to be confused with shale, from which it may be formed, or schist.

The word "slate" is also used for certain types of object made from slate rock. It may mean a single roofing tile made of slate, or a writing slate, which was traditionally a small, smooth piece of the rock, often framed in wood, used with chalk as a notepad or notice board, and especially for recording charges in pubs and inns. The phrases "clean slate" and "blank slate" come from this usage.

== Description ==
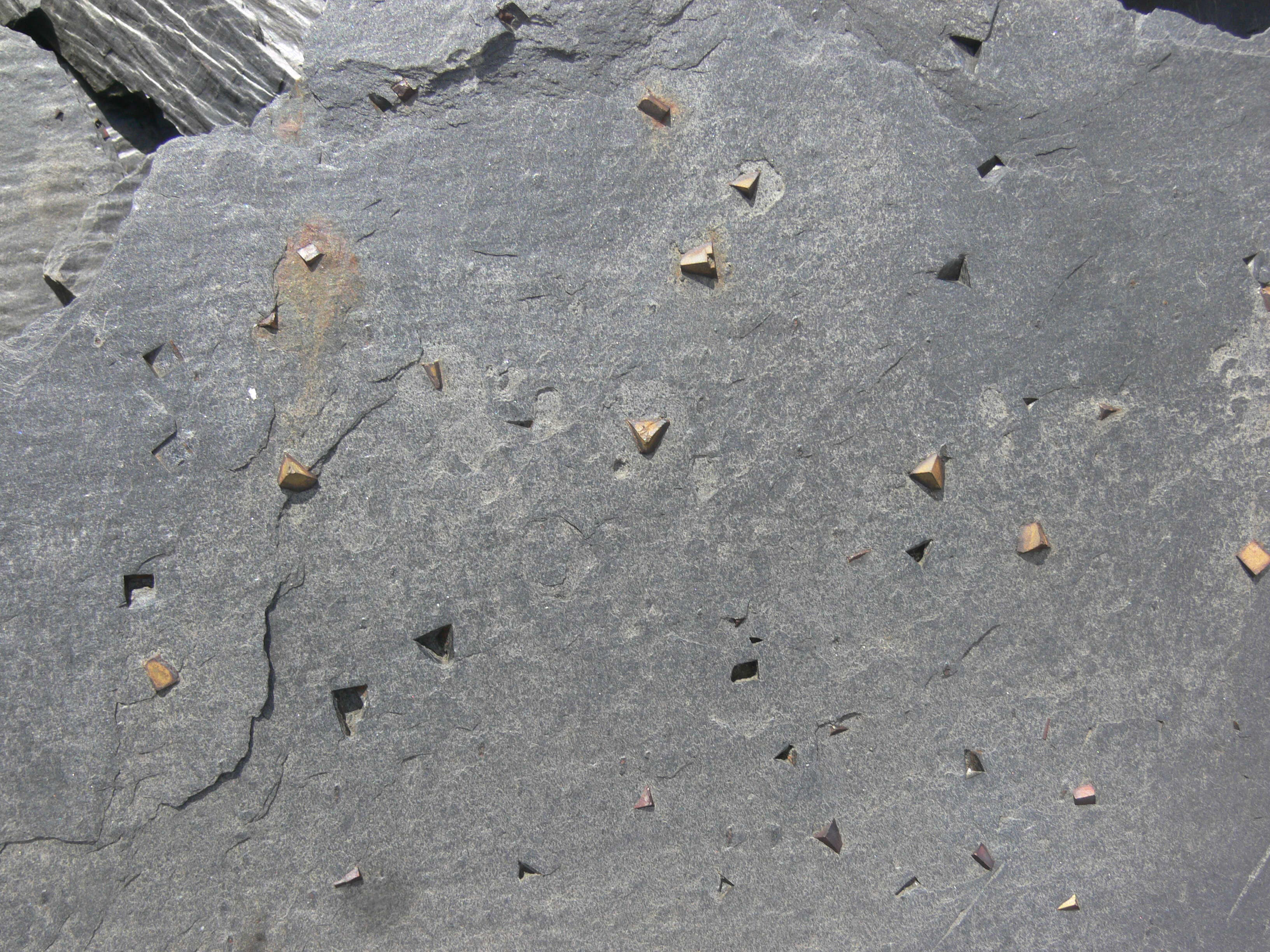
Slate with pyrite

Detail of a slate outcrop at the beach of Porto Covo, Portugal

Slate is a fine-grained, metamorphic rock that shows no obvious compositional layering but can easily be split into thin slabs and plates. It is usually formed by low-grade regional metamorphism of mudrock. This mild degree of metamorphism produces a rock in which the individual mineral crystals remain microscopic in size, producing a characteristic slaty cleavage in which fresh cleavage surfaces appear dull. This is in contrast to the silky cleaved surfaces of phyllite, which is the next-higher grade of metamorphic rock derived from mudstone. The direction of cleavage is independent of any sedimentary structures in the original mudrock, reflecting instead the direction of regional compression.

Slaty cleavage is continuous, meaning that the individual cleavage planes are too closely spaced to be discernible in hand samples. The texture of the slate is totally dominated by these pervasive cleavage planes. Under a microscope, the slate is found to consist of very thin lenses of quartz and feldspar (QF-domains) separated by layers of mica (M-domains). These are typically less than 100 μm (micron) thick. Because slate was formed in low heat and pressure, compared to most other metamorphic rocks, some fossils can be found in slate; sometimes even microscopic remains of delicate organisms can be found in slate.

The process of conversion of mudrock to slate involves a loss of up to 50% of the volume of the mudrock as it is compacted. Grains of platy minerals, such as clay minerals, are rotated to form parallel layers perpendicular to the direction of compaction, which begin to impart cleavage to the rock. Slaty cleavage is fully developed as the clay minerals begin to be converted to chlorite and mica. Organic carbon in the rock is converted to graphite.

Slate is mainly composed of the minerals quartz, illite, and chlorite, which account for up to 95% of its composition. The most important accessory minerals are iron oxides (such as hematite and magnetite), iron sulfides (such as pyrite), and carbonate minerals. Feldspar may be present as albite or, less commonly, orthoclase. Occasionally, as in the purple slates of North Wales, ferrous (iron(II)) reduction spheres form around iron nuclei, leaving a light-green, spotted texture. These spheres are sometimes deformed by a subsequent applied stress field into ovoids, which appear as ellipses when viewed on a cleavage plane of the specimen. However, some evidence shows that reduced spots may also form after deformation and acquire an elliptical shape from preferential infiltration along the cleavage direction, so caution is required in using reduction ellipsoids to estimate deformation.

== Terminology ==
Before the mid-19th century, the terms "slate", "shale", and "schist" were not sharply distinguished. In the context of underground coal mining in the United States, the term slate was commonly used to refer to shale well into the 20th century. For example, roof slate referred to shale above a coal seam, and draw slate referred to shale that fell from the mine roof as the coal was removed.

The British Geological Survey recommends that the term "slate" be used in scientific writings only when very little else is known about the rock that would allow a more definite classification. For example, if the characteristics of the rock show definitely that it was formed by metamorphosis of shale, it should be described in scientific writings as a metashale. If its origin is uncertain, but the rock is known to be rich in mica, it should be described as a pelite.

== Uses ==
=== Construction ===
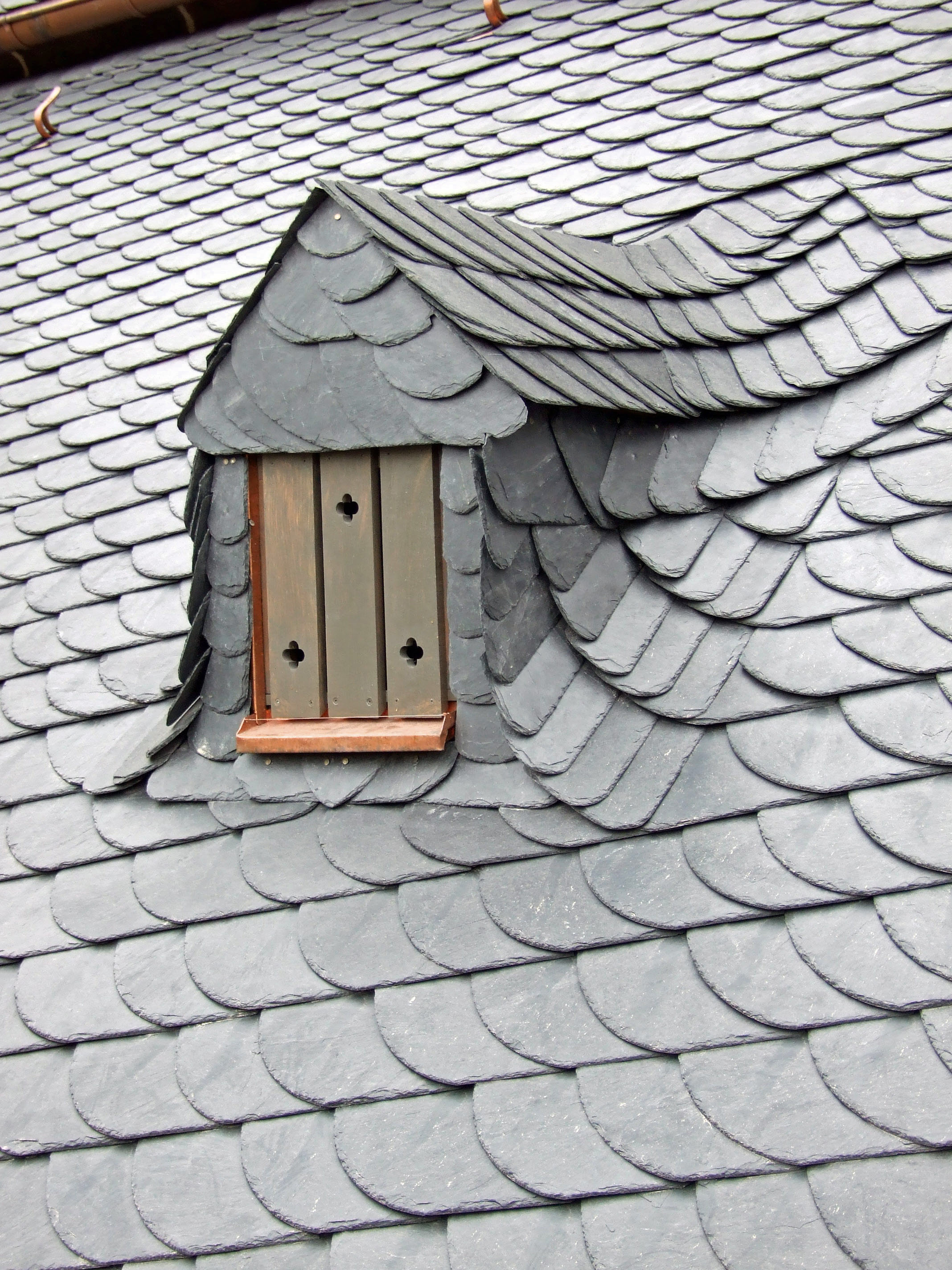
A fine slate tile work, Saint Leonhard's Church in Frankfurt am Main, Germany

Slate can be made into roofing slate, a type of roof tile which are installed by a slater. Slate has two lines of breakability—cleavage and grain—which make it possible to split the stone into thin sheets. When broken, slate retains a natural appearance while remaining relatively flat and easy to stack. A series of "slate booms" occurred in Europe from the 1870s until the First World War following improvements in railway, road and waterway transportation systems.

Slate is particularly suitable as a roofing material as it has an extremely low water absorption index of less than 0.4%, making the material resistant to frost damage. Natural slate, which requires only minimal processing, has an embodied energy that compares favorably with other roofing materials. Natural slate is used by building professionals as a result of its beauty and durability. Slate is incredibly durable and can last several hundred years, often with little or no maintenance. Natural slate is also fire resistant and energy efficient.

Slate roof tiles are usually fixed (fastened) either with nails or with hooks (as is common with Spanish slate). In the UK, fixing is typically with double nails onto timber battens (England and Wales) or nailed directly onto timber sarking boards (Scotland and Northern Ireland). Nails were traditionally of copper, although there are modern alloy and stainless steel alternatives. Both these methods, if used properly, provide a long-lasting weathertight roof with a lifespan of around 60–125 years.

Some mainland European slate suppliers suggest that using hook fixing means that:

- Areas of weakness on the tile are fewer since no holes have to be drilled
- Roofing features such as valleys and domes are easier to create since narrow tiles can be used
- Hook fixing is particularly suitable in regions subject to severe weather conditions, since there is greater resistance to wind uplift, as the lower edge of the slate is secured.

The metal hooks are, however, visible and may be unsuitable for historic properties. Slate tiles are often used for interior and exterior flooring, stairs, walkways and wall cladding. Tiles are installed and set on mortar and grouted along the edges. Chemical sealants are often used on tiles to improve durability and appearance, increase stain resistance, reduce efflorescence, and increase or reduce surface smoothness. Tiles are often sold gauged, meaning that the back surface is ground for ease of installation. Slate flooring can be slippery when used in external locations subject to rain.

Slate tiles were used in 19th century UK building construction (apart from roofs) and in slate quarrying areas such as Blaenau Ffestiniog and Bethesda, Wales there are still many buildings wholly constructed of slate. Slates can also be set into walls to provide a rudimentary damp-proof membrane. Small offcuts are used as shims to level floor joists. In areas where slate is plentiful it is also used in pieces of various sizes for building walls and hedges, sometimes combined with other kinds of stone.

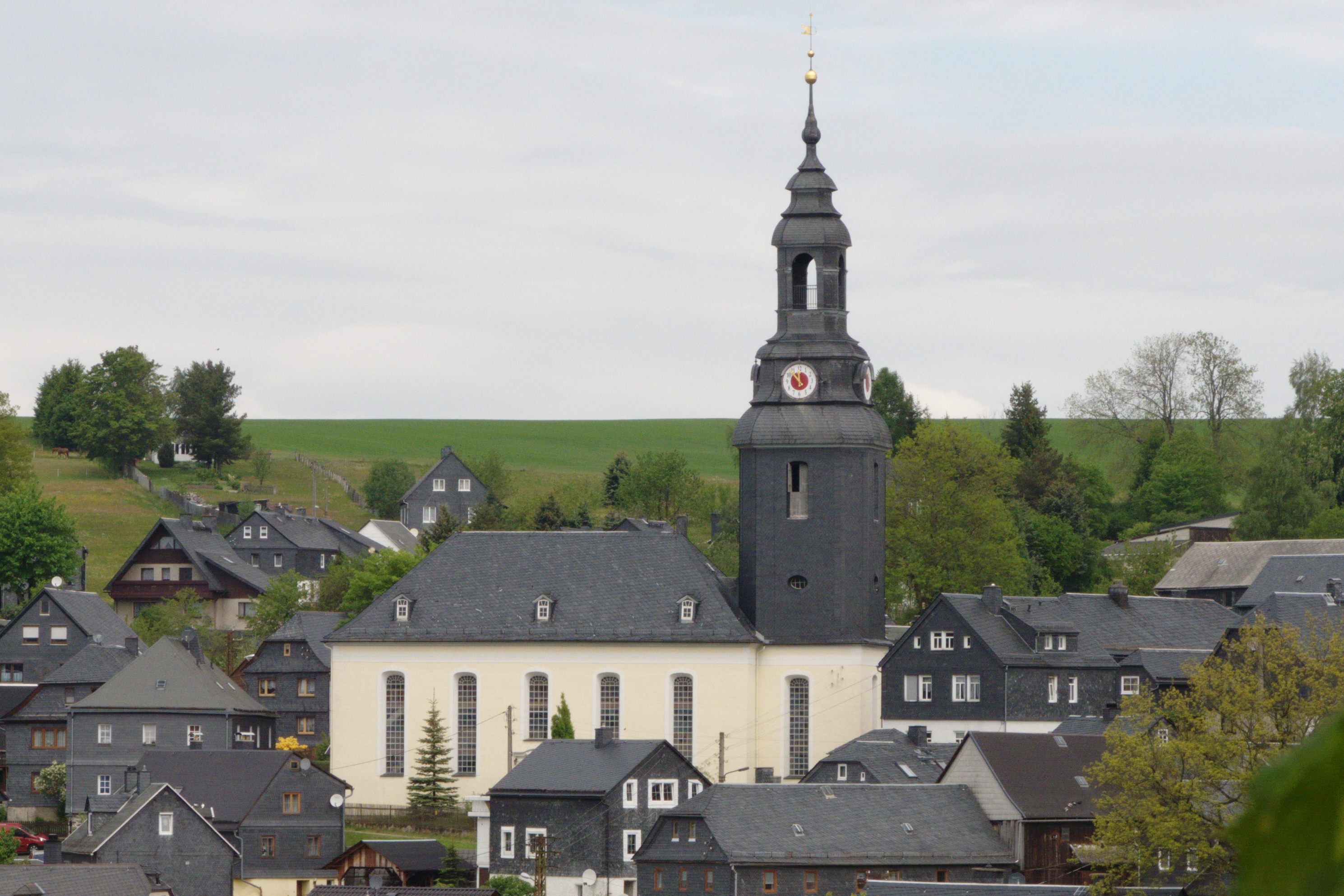
A slate-faced church and homes in Wurzbach, Germany

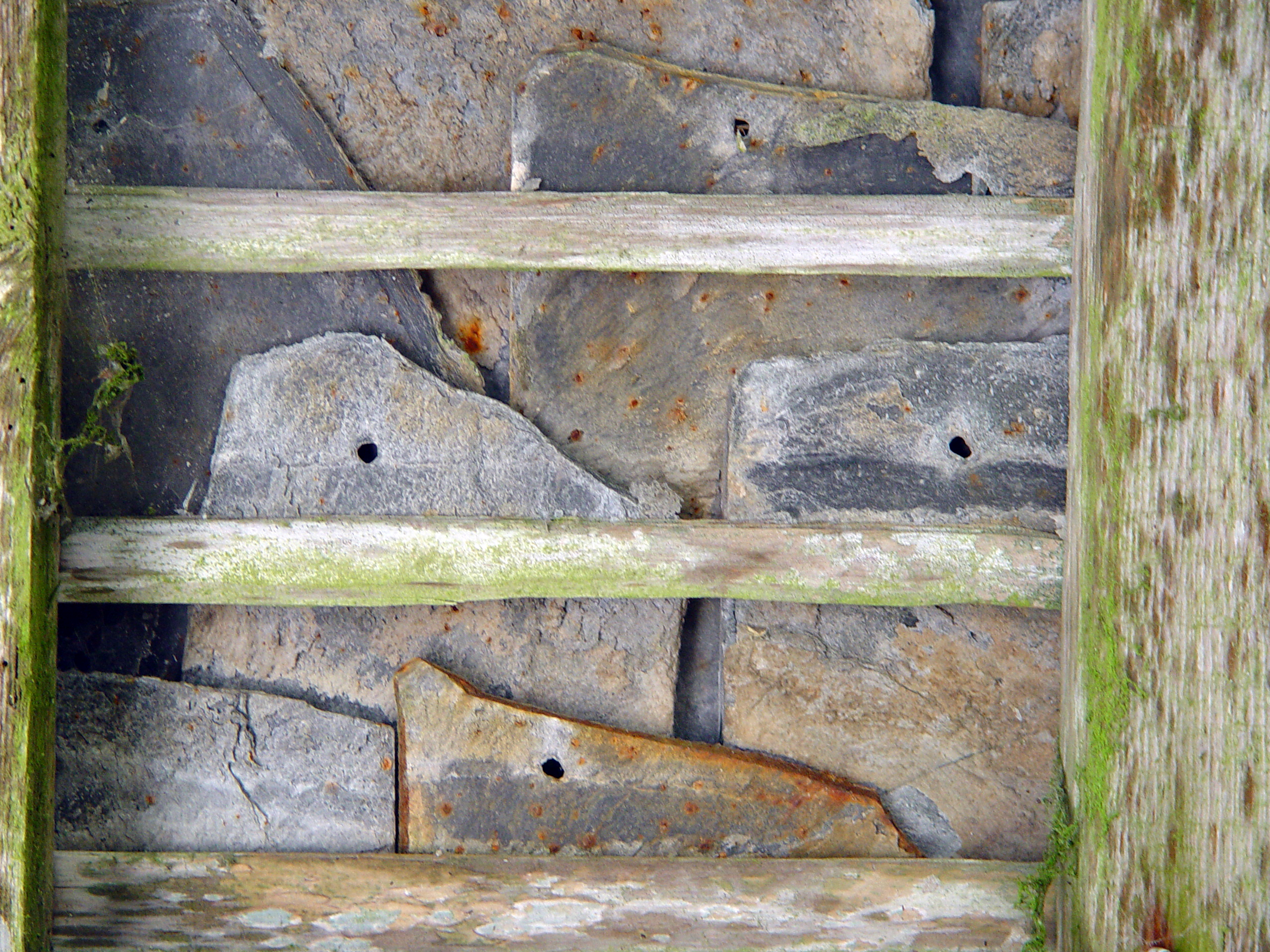
Slates with holes at a farm in Tremedda, Cornwall, England

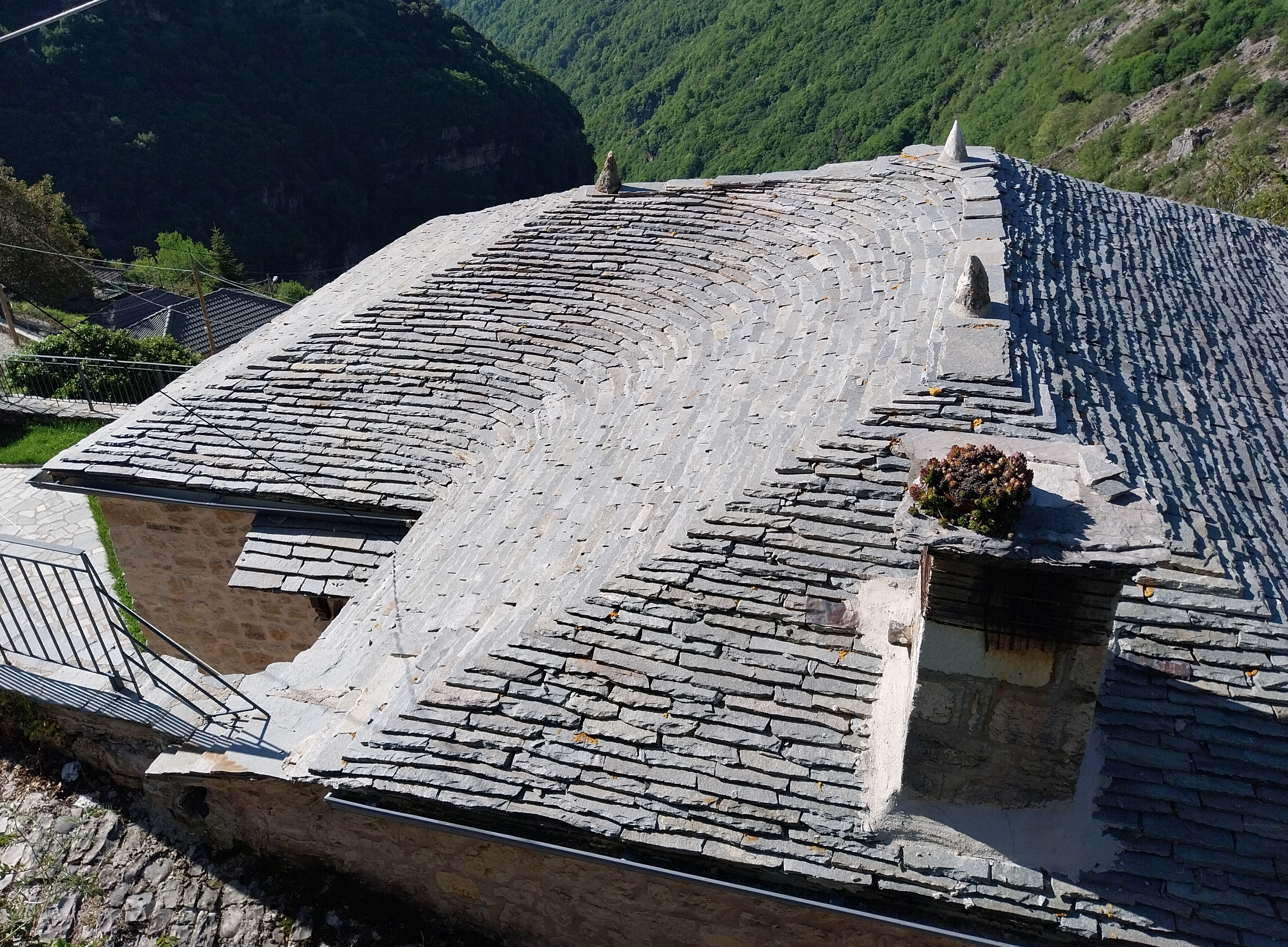
A slate roof in Syrrako (Greece), built with a curved valley layout and finials on top

=== Other uses ===
Because it is a good electrical insulator and fireproof, it was used to construct early-20th-century electric switchboards and relay controls for large electric motors. Because of its thermal stability and chemical inertness, slate has been used for laboratory bench tops and for billiard table tops.

Slate was used by earlier cultures as whetstone to hone knives, but whetstones are nowadays more typically made of quartz. In 18th- and 19th-century schools, slate was extensively used for blackboards and individual writing slates, for which slate or chalk pencils were used. In modern homes slate is often used as table coasters.

In areas where it is available, high-quality slate is used for tombstones and commemorative tablets. In some cases slate was used by the ancient Maya civilization to fashion stelae. Slate was the traditional material of choice for black Go stones in Japan, alongside clamshell for white stones. It is now considered to be a luxury.

Pennsylvania slate is widely used in the manufacture of turkey calls used for hunting turkeys. The tones produced from the slate, when scratched with various species of wood striker, imitates almost exactly the calls of all four species of wild turkey in North America: eastern, Rio Grande, Osceola and Merriam's.

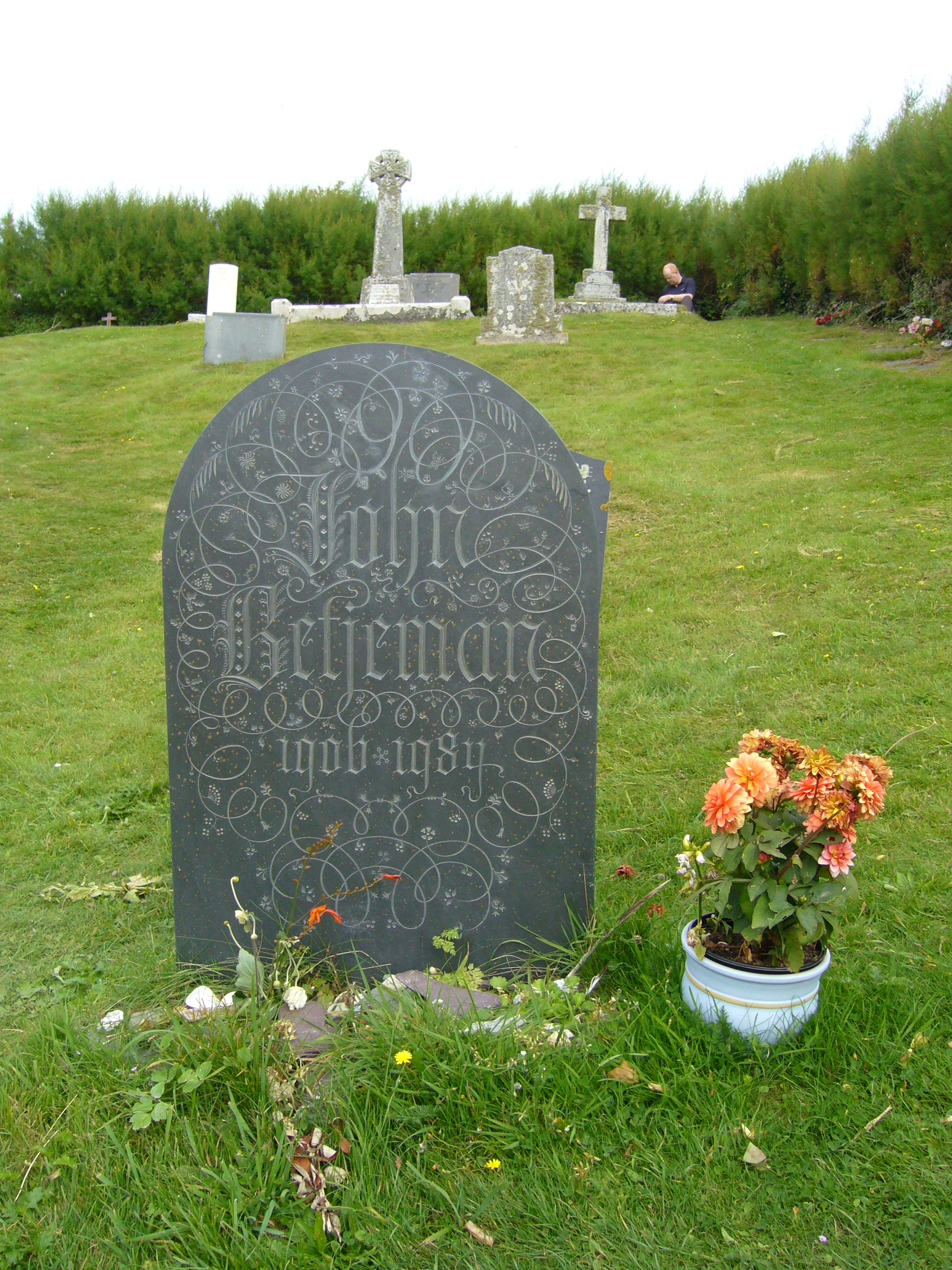
John Betjeman's grave with inscription on slate in Cornwall

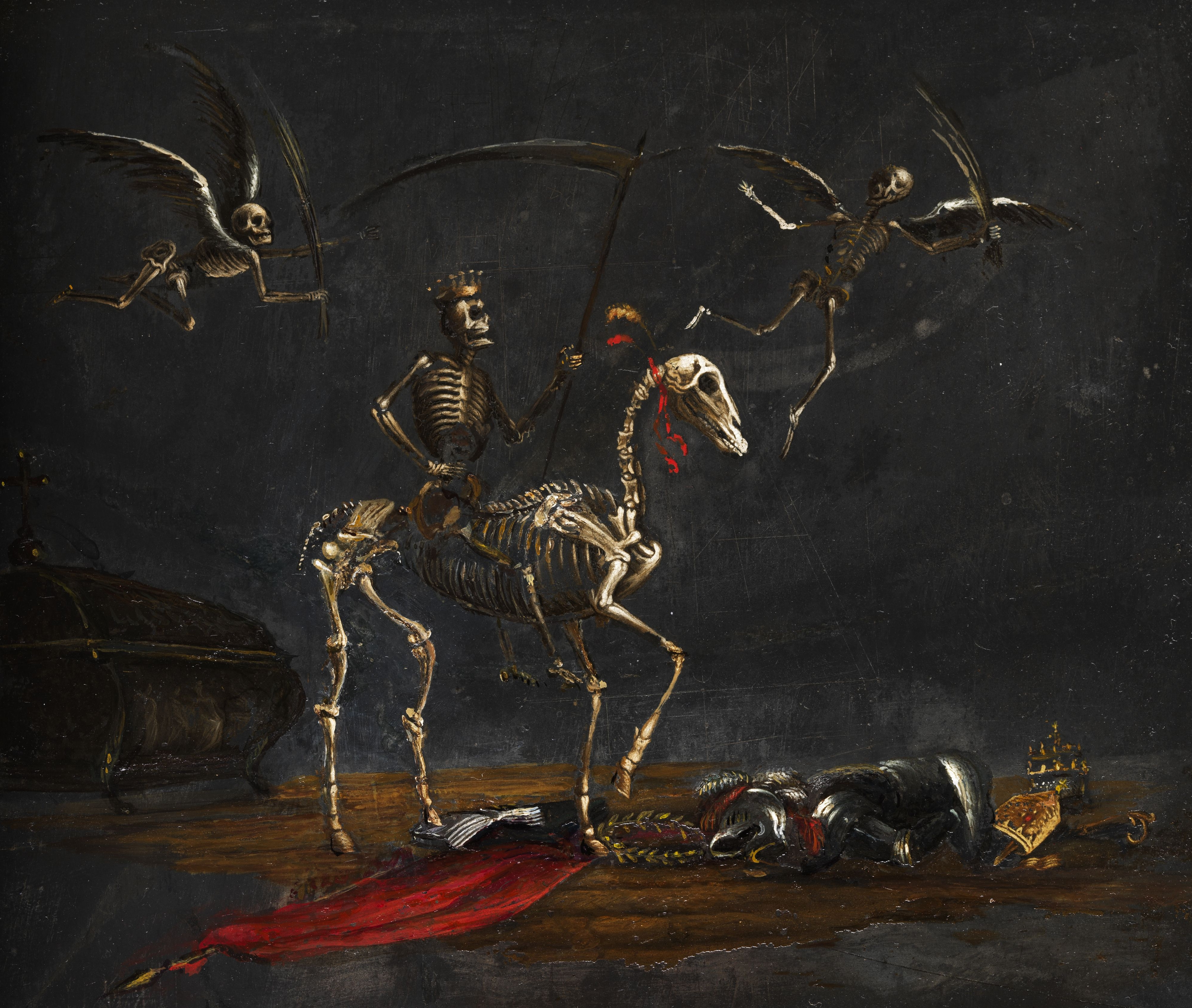
Leonard Bramer, painting Mors Triumphans (oil on slate)

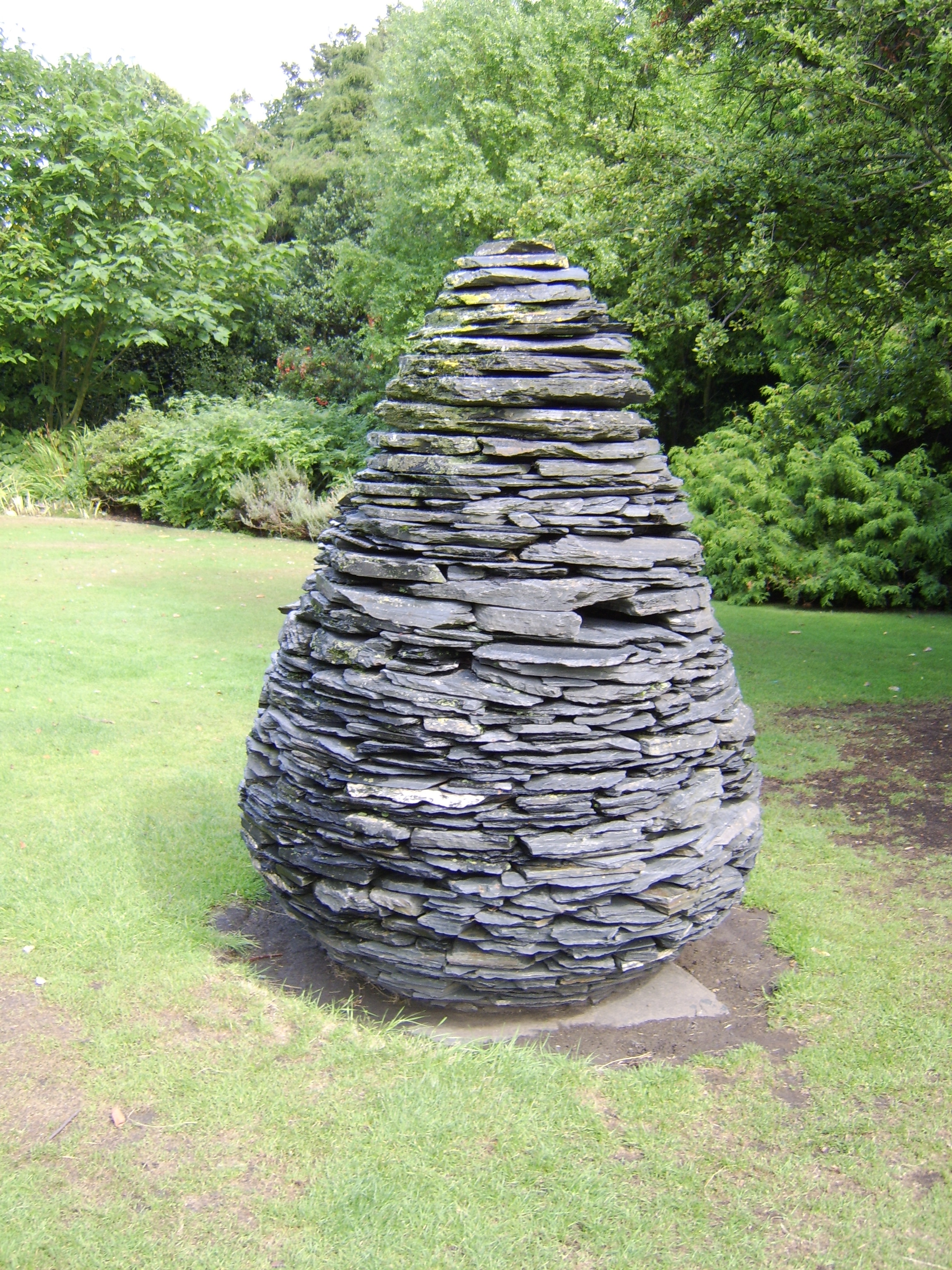
"Slate Cone" in Royal Botanic Garden Edinburgh

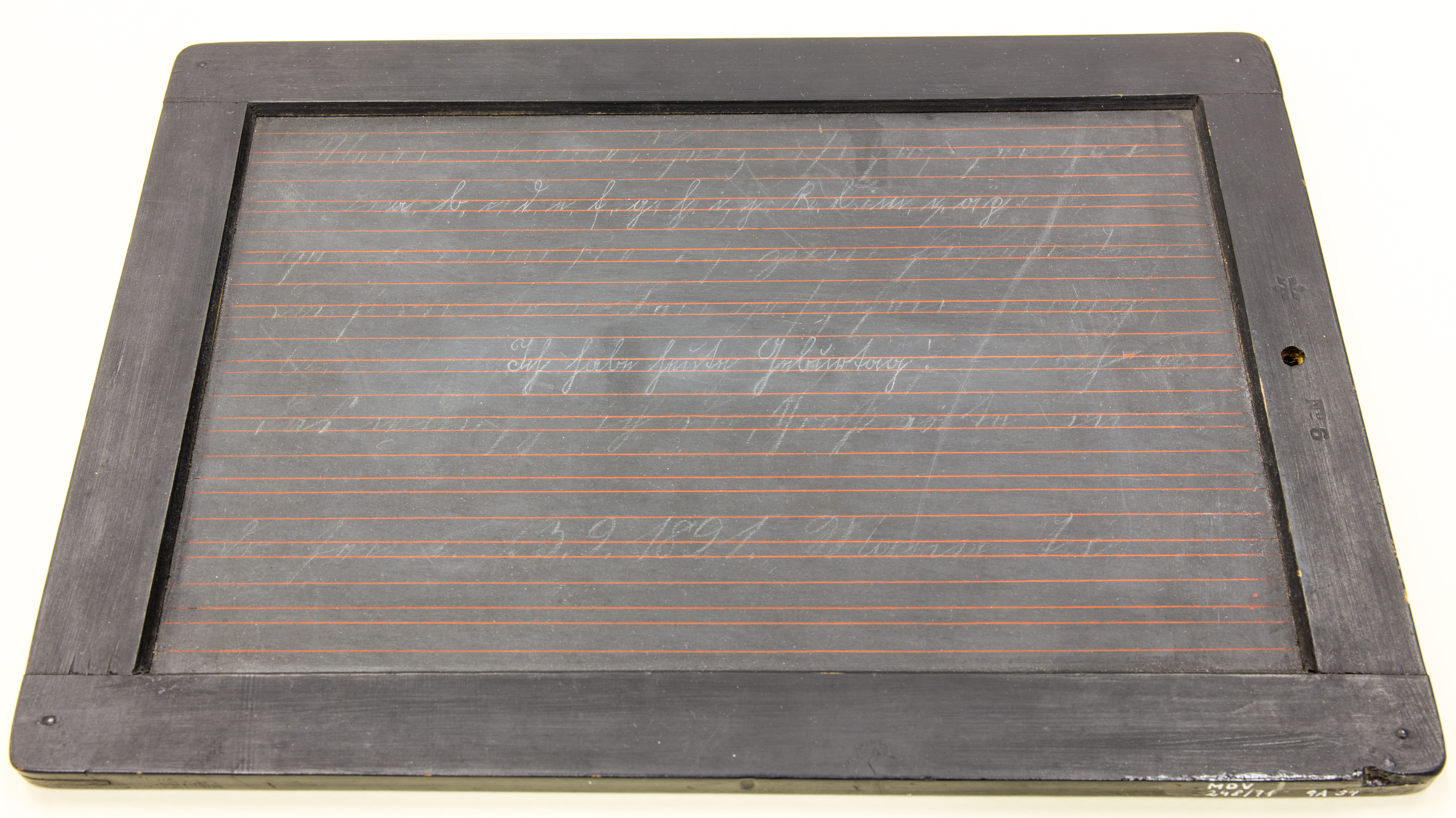
Writing slate, showing calligraphy exercise

== Extraction ==
Most slate in Europe today comes from Spain, the world's largest producer and exporter of natural slate, and 90 percent of Europe's natural slate used for roofing originates from the slate industry there. Lesser slate-producing regions in present-day Europe include Wales (with UNESCO landscape status and a museum at Llanberis), Cornwall (famously the village of Delabole), Cumbria (see Burlington Slate Quarries, Honister Slate Mine and Skiddaw Slate) and, formerly in the West Highlands of Scotland, around Ballachulish and the Slate Islands in the United Kingdom. Parts of France (Anjou, Loire Valley, Ardennes, Brittany, Savoie) and Belgium (Ardennes), Liguria in northern Italy, especially between the town of Lavagna (whose name is inherited as the term for chalkboard in Italian) and Fontanabuona valley; Portugal especially around Valongo in the north of the country. Germany's Moselle River region, Hunsrück (with a former mine open as a museum at Fell), Eifel, Westerwald, Thuringia and north Bavaria; and Alta, Norway (actually schist, not a true slate). Some of the slate from Wales and Cumbria is colored slate (non-blue): purple and formerly green in Wales and green in Cumbria.

In North America, slate is produced in Newfoundland, eastern Pennsylvania, Buckingham County, Virginia, and the Slate Valley region in Vermont and New York, where colored slate is mined in the Granville, New York, area. A major slating operation existed in Monson, Maine, during the late 19th and early 20th centuries, where the slate is usually dark purple to blackish, and many local structures are roofed with slate tiles. The roof of St. Patrick's Cathedral in New York City and the headstone of John F. Kennedy's gravesite in Arlington National Cemetery are both made of Monson slate.

Slate is found in the Arctic and was used by Inuit to make the blades for ulus. China has vast slate deposits; in recent years its export of finished and unfinished slate has increased. Deposits of slate exist throughout Australia, with large reserves quarried in the Adelaide Hills in Willunga, Kanmantoo, and the Mid North at Mintaro and Spalding. Slate is abundant in Brazil, the world's second-largest producer of slate, around Papagaios in Minas Gerais, which extracts 95 percent of Brazil's slate. However, not all "slate" products from Brazil are entitled to bear the CE mark.

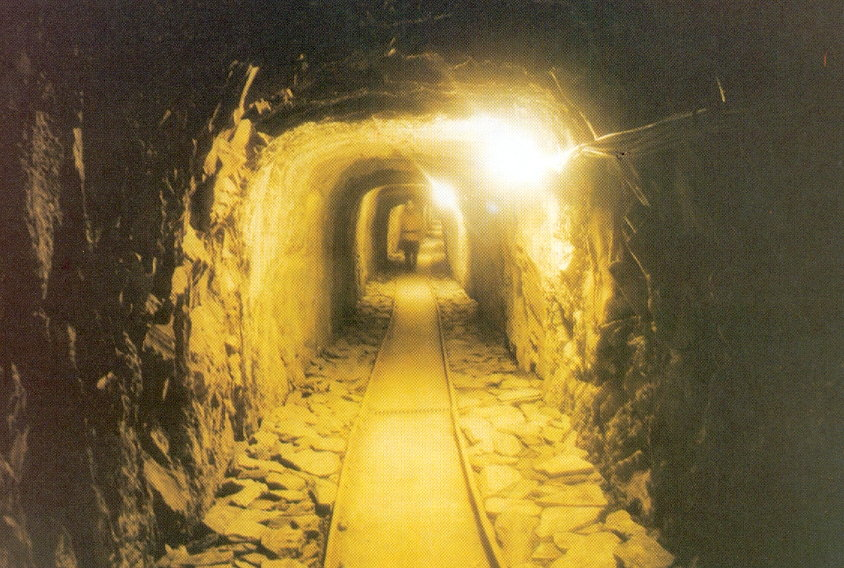
The Fell Exhibition Slate Mine in Rhineland-Palatinate, Germany

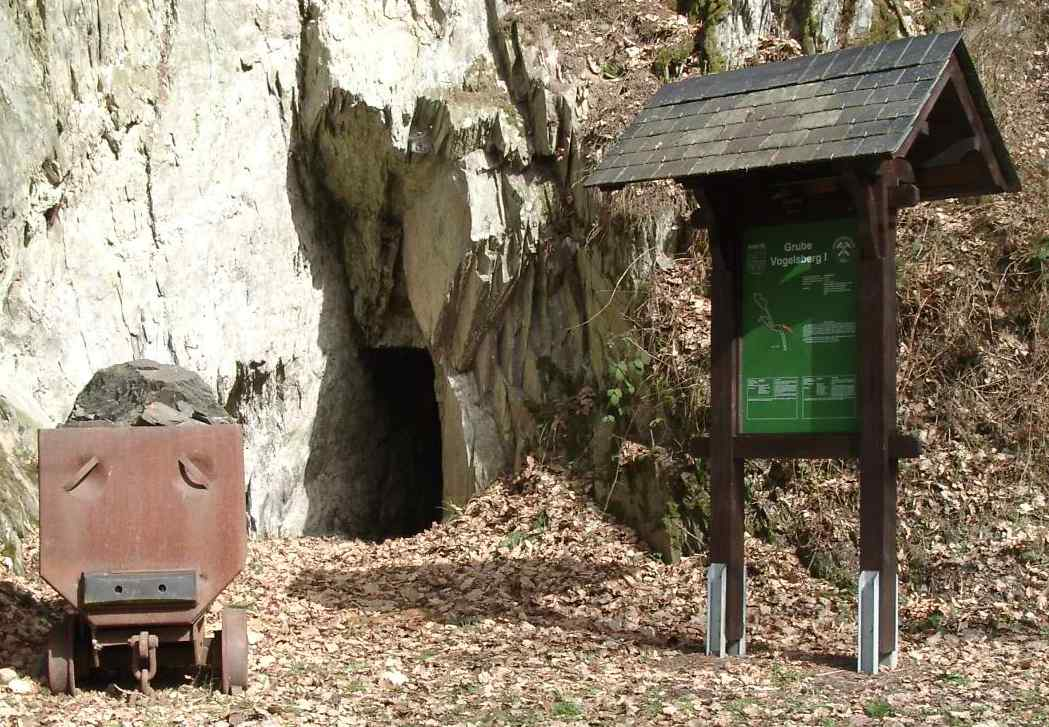
The historical Vogelsberg 1 pit at Fell Exhibition Slate Mine

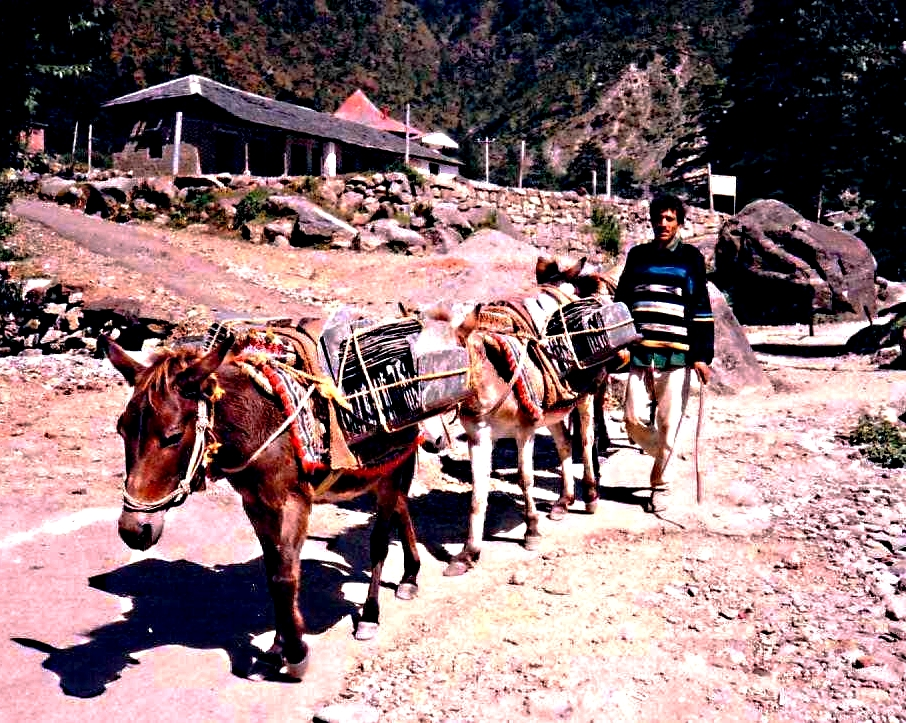
Mules carrying slate roof tiles on their backs in Dharamshala, India, in 1993

Workers mining slate at Mintaro Quarry in Mintaro, South Australia, c. 1880

== See also ==
- Bluestone in South Australia, a form of slate used extensively in Adelaide 1850s–1920s
