= John Kelt Edwards =

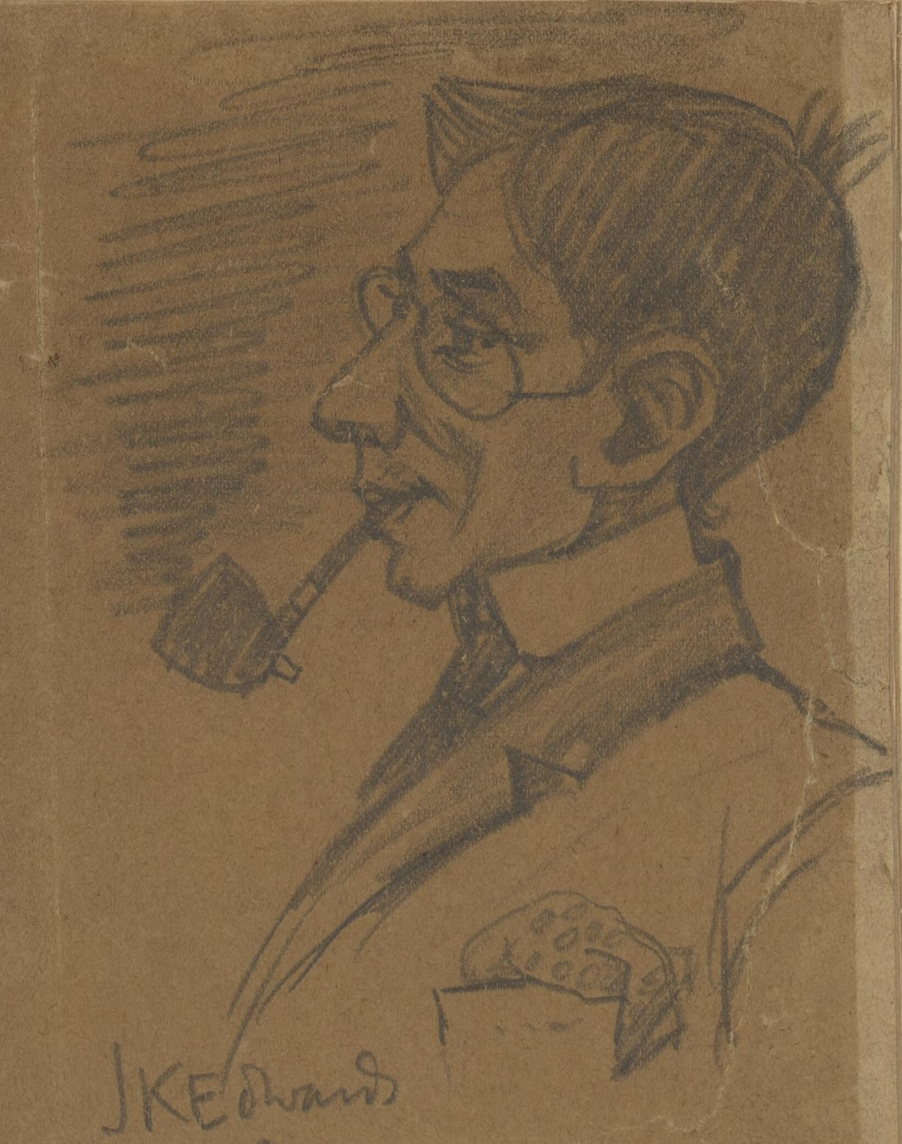
Self portrait of John Kelt Edwards

John Kelt Edwards (4 March 1875 – 11 October 1934) was a Welsh artist and cartoonist.

== Early life and education ==
John Edwards was born on 4 March 1875, the son of Margaret and Jonathan Edwards, a shopkeeper and ironmonger from Blaenau Ffestiniog. Edwards was educated a primary school in Blaenau Festiniog then at Llandovery College. He studied engraving in Wolverhampton and attended Beaumont Academy in Jersey.

In 1900 Edwards won a certificate for 12 paintings on the theme of The Sleeping Poet at the Liverpool National Eisteddfod. He continued his education at Ecole des Beaux Arts, Paris where he studied under M. Bonnat, of the Ecole des Beaux Arts, Paris. After leaving college he toured Europe, and exhibited his artwork at the Paris Salon. In 1902 he studied at the British Academy of Arts in Rome. It was during his time in Europe that Edwards adopted the middle name Kelt, apparently following the advice of Augusta, daughter of Augusta Hall, Baroness Llanover, who suggested that a common name like John Edwards was unlikely to stand out for a promising artist.

== Career ==
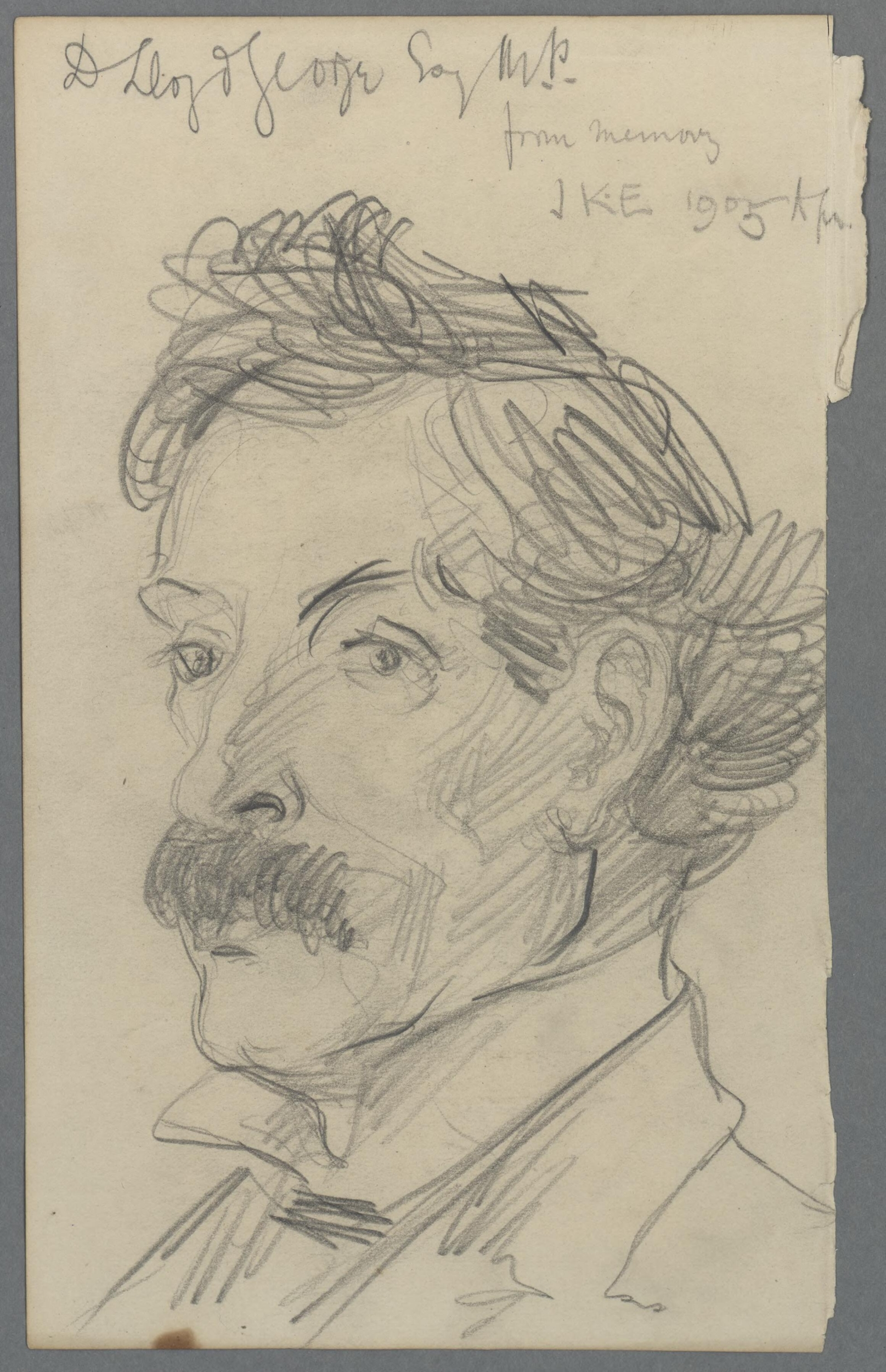
D. Lloyd George Esq. M.P. drawing by John Kelt Edwards. (1905) pencil, black and white; 222 x 142 mm. Part of the National Library of Wales portrait archive.

In 1902 Kelt Edwards had his first important Welsh commission, painting 12 pictures for Daniel Rees' translation of Dante's Divine Comedy (Dwyfol Gân 1902), then exhibiting two of the original pictures at the Royal Cambrian Academy of Art. He then prepared illustrations for a number of Welsh books and magazines such as the cover of Cofiant a Barddoniaeth Ben Bowen, by David Bowen (Myfyr Hefin), the cover of Y Traethodydd and Y Winllan. He illustrated a number of pictures based on the legends of the Mabinogion for Owen Morgan Edwards' Cymru magazine. Some of his pictures were included in Sir John Morris-Jones's book Gwlad fy Nhadau.

Kelt Edwards opened a studio in London, where he specialised in painting portraits of notable Welsh people in London. He also put on exhibitions of his landscape paintings. Among the famous Welsh people he portrayed were Lloyd George; his daughter Megan Lloyd George; Sir O. M Edwards; Sir Walter Morgan Lord Mayor of London; Sir Francis Edwards; Sir Samuel Thomas Evans; Sir Vincent Evans, John Hinds, Edward Thomas John and Timothy Davies. He was also known for designs connected to the military, he designed the badge and banner for the Comrades of the Great War and the roll of honour of the Royal Welch Fusiliers. He also contributed book illustrations and produced war cartoons.

At the start of the First World War, many of the people who could afford to pay for portraits moved out of London and Kelt Edwards had to close his studio. He moved to live in Ceinewydd, Talsarnau, a summer cottage on the banks of the River Dwyryd, which was owned by his family. He received a "pension" of 3 shillings a week from his family for his upkeep. He supplemented his income by producing prints and cards to sell by post. The most famous of these was a memorial card for Hedd Wyn published by the Brython press in 1918.

Kelt Edwards died of cancer at Ceinewydd on 11 October 1934 and was buried at Blaenau Ffestiniog.

== Legacy ==
A collection of Edwards' letters to poet T. Gwynn Jones is held by the National Library of Wales.

== Gallery ==
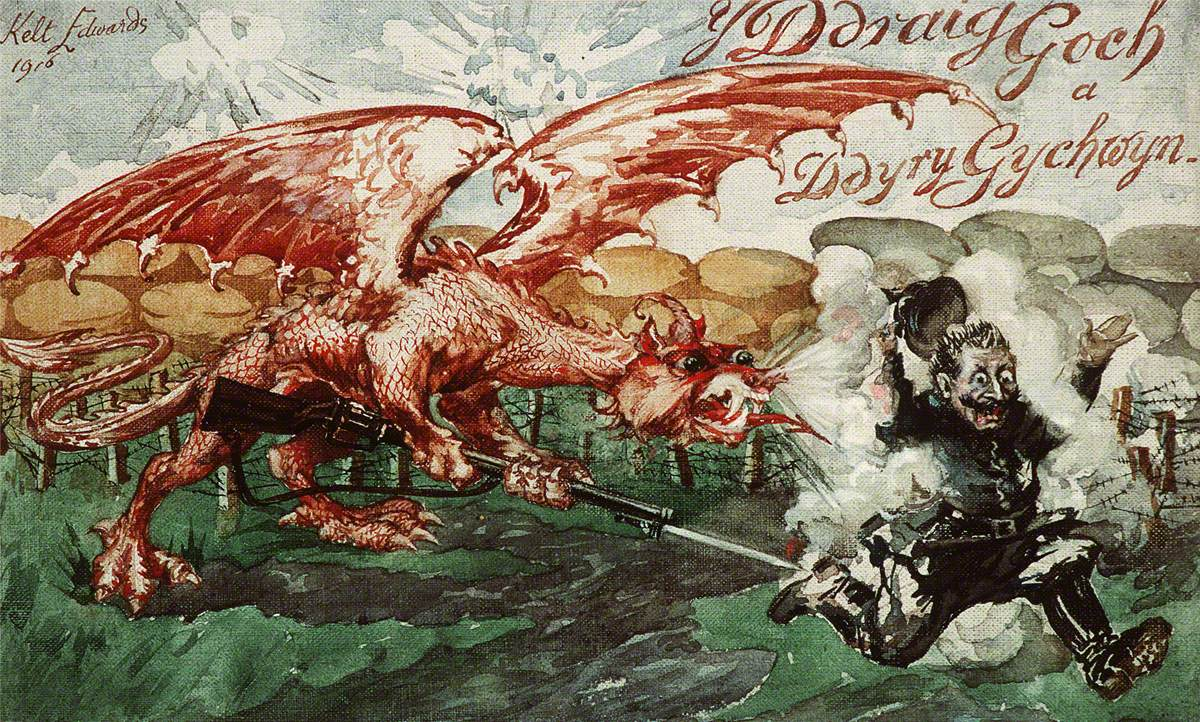
Y Ddraig Goch a Ddyry Gychwyn

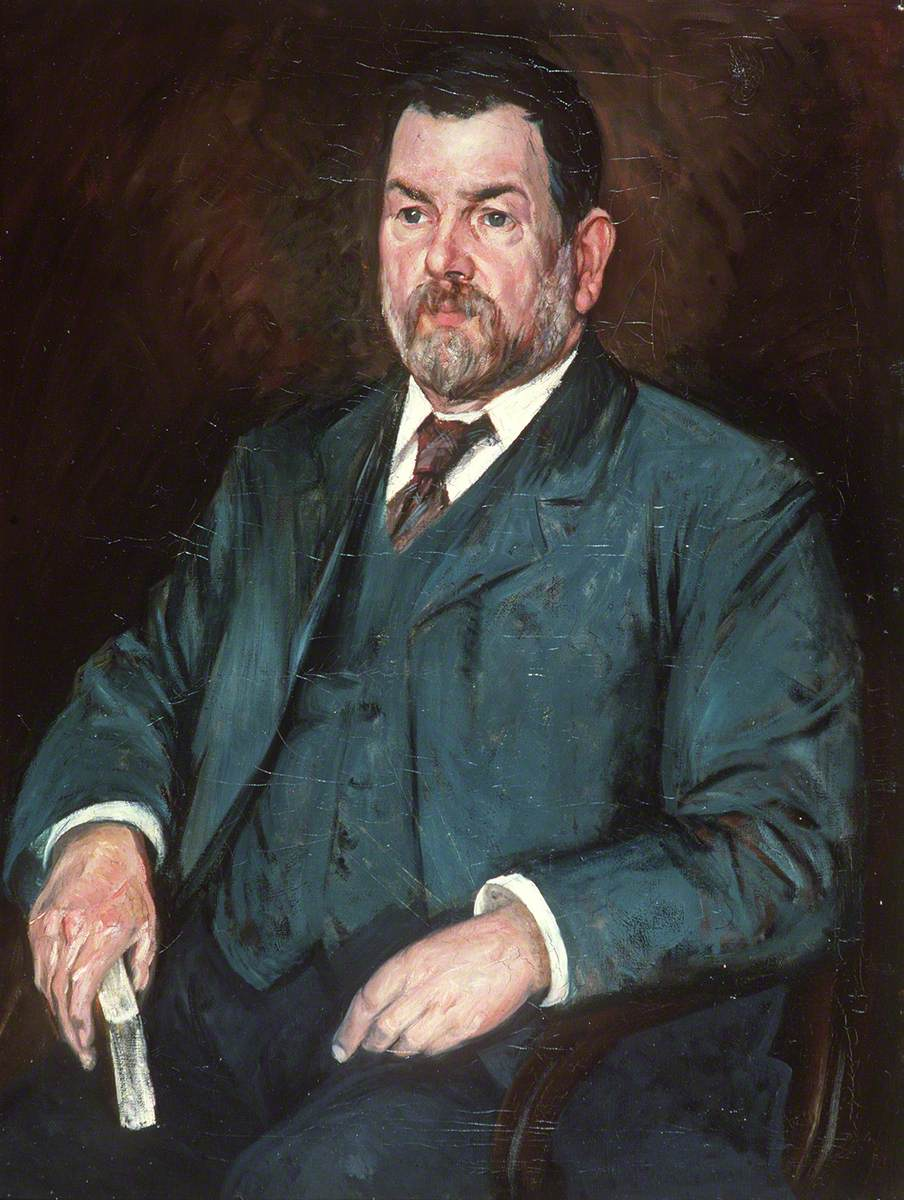
John Edwards, the Artist's father

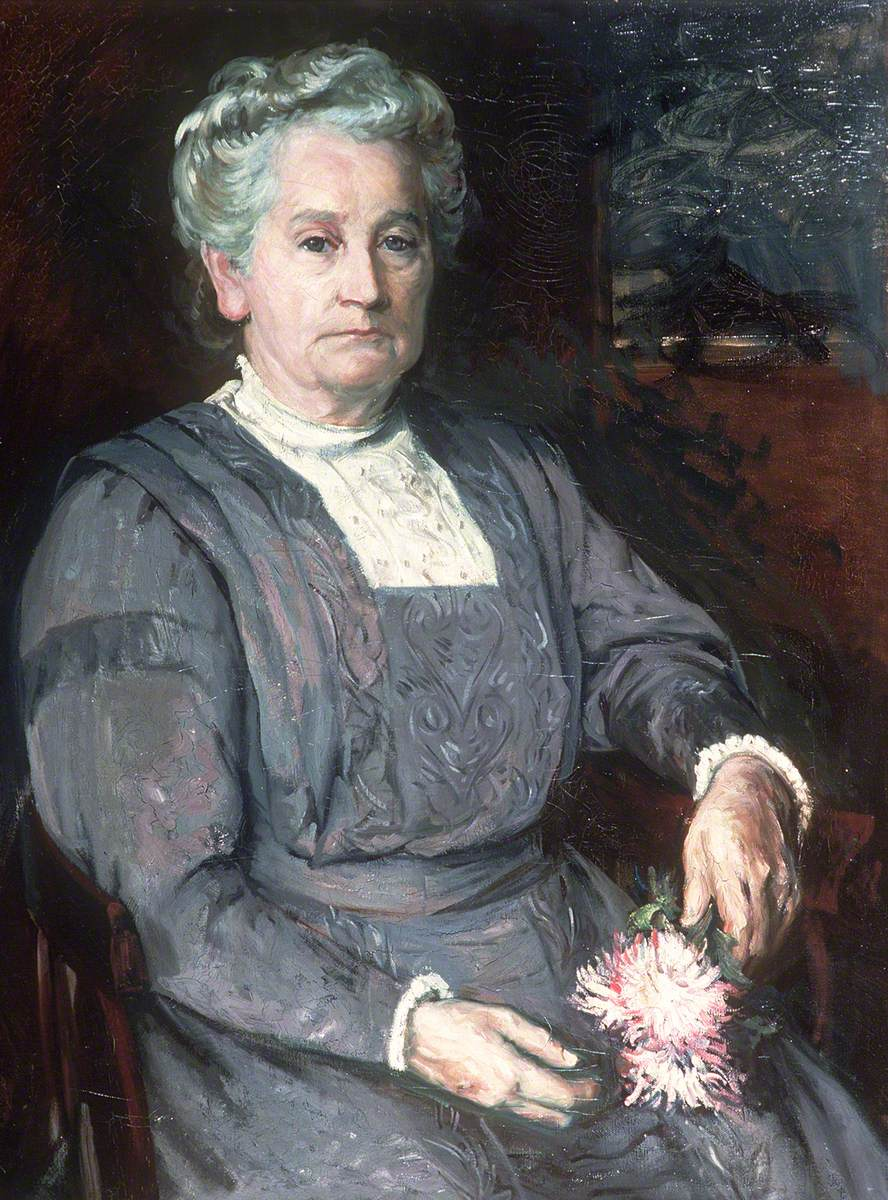
Margaret Edwards, the Artist's mother

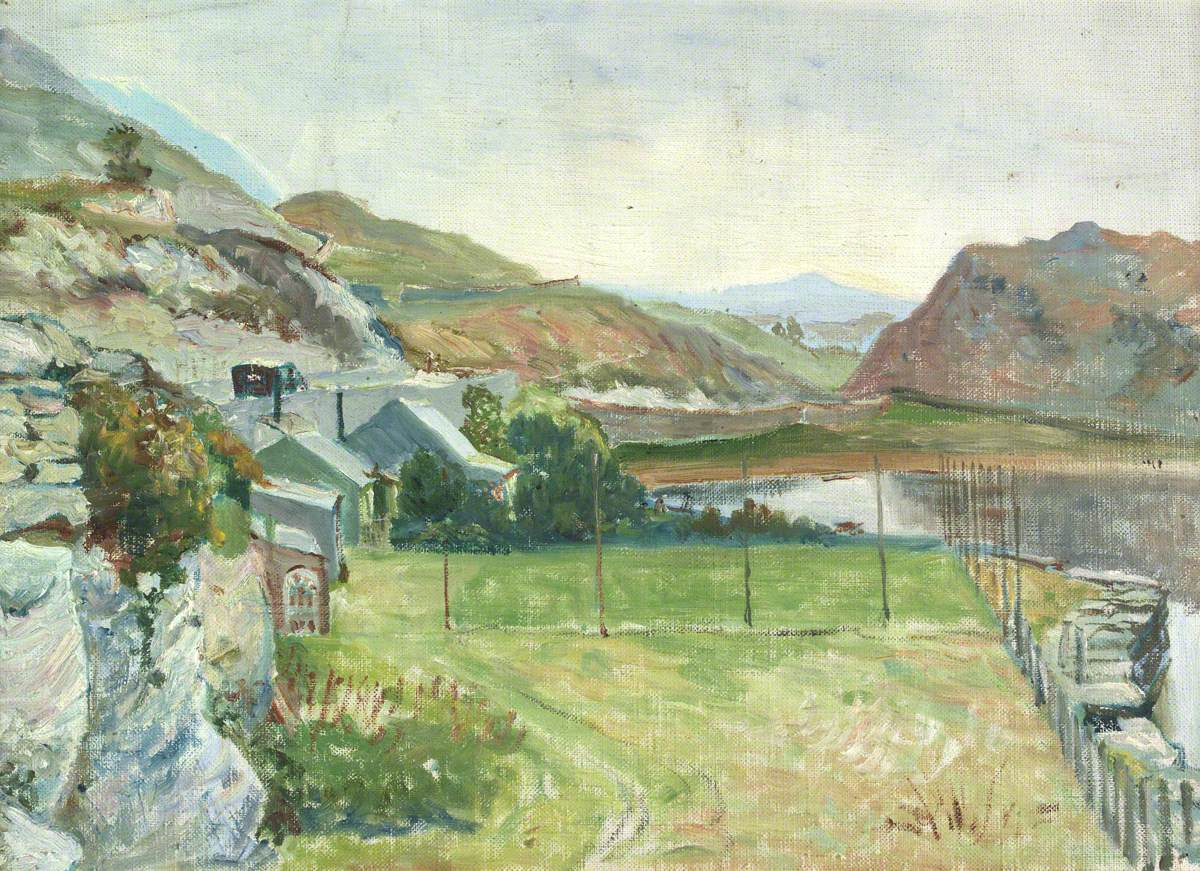
Cei Newydd, near Talsarnau, the Artist's home

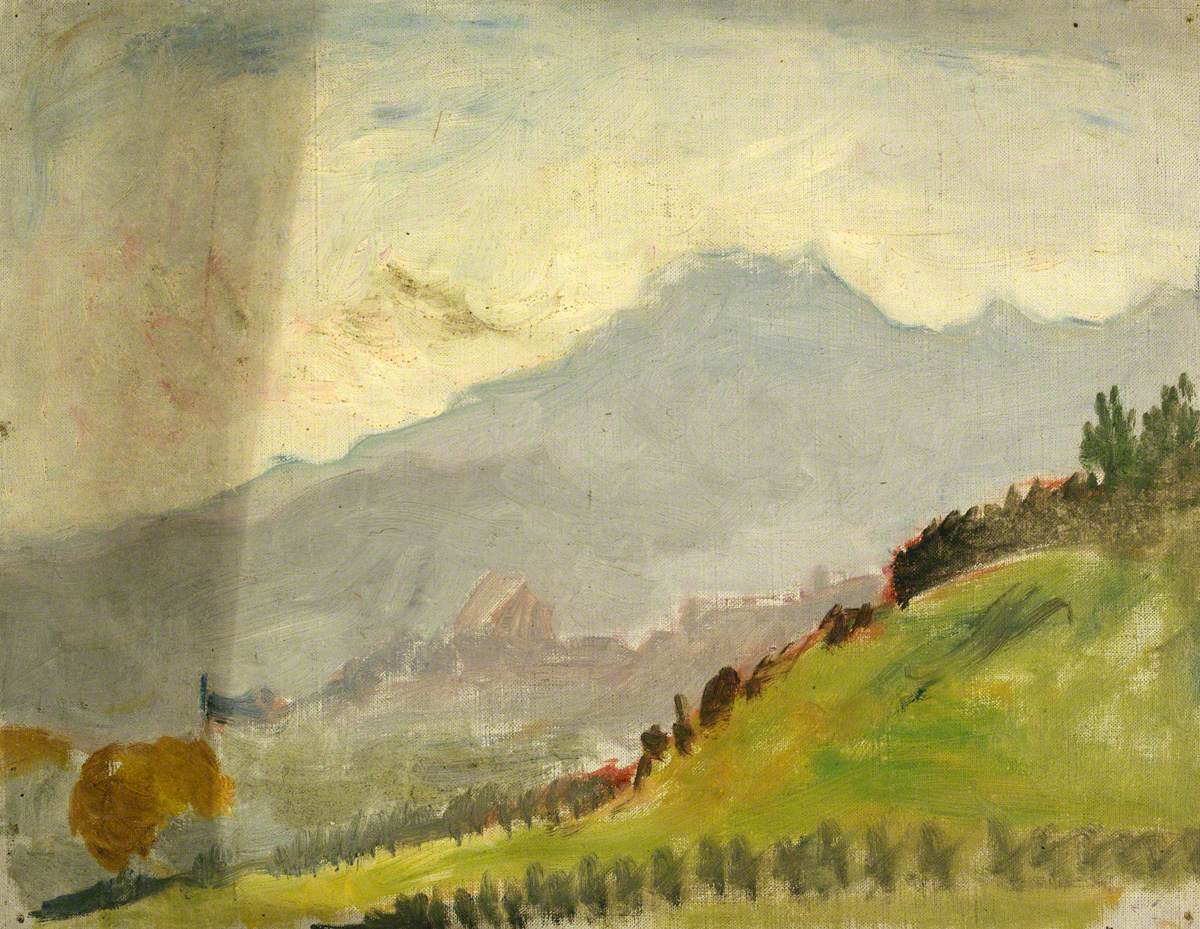
Llan Ffestiniog

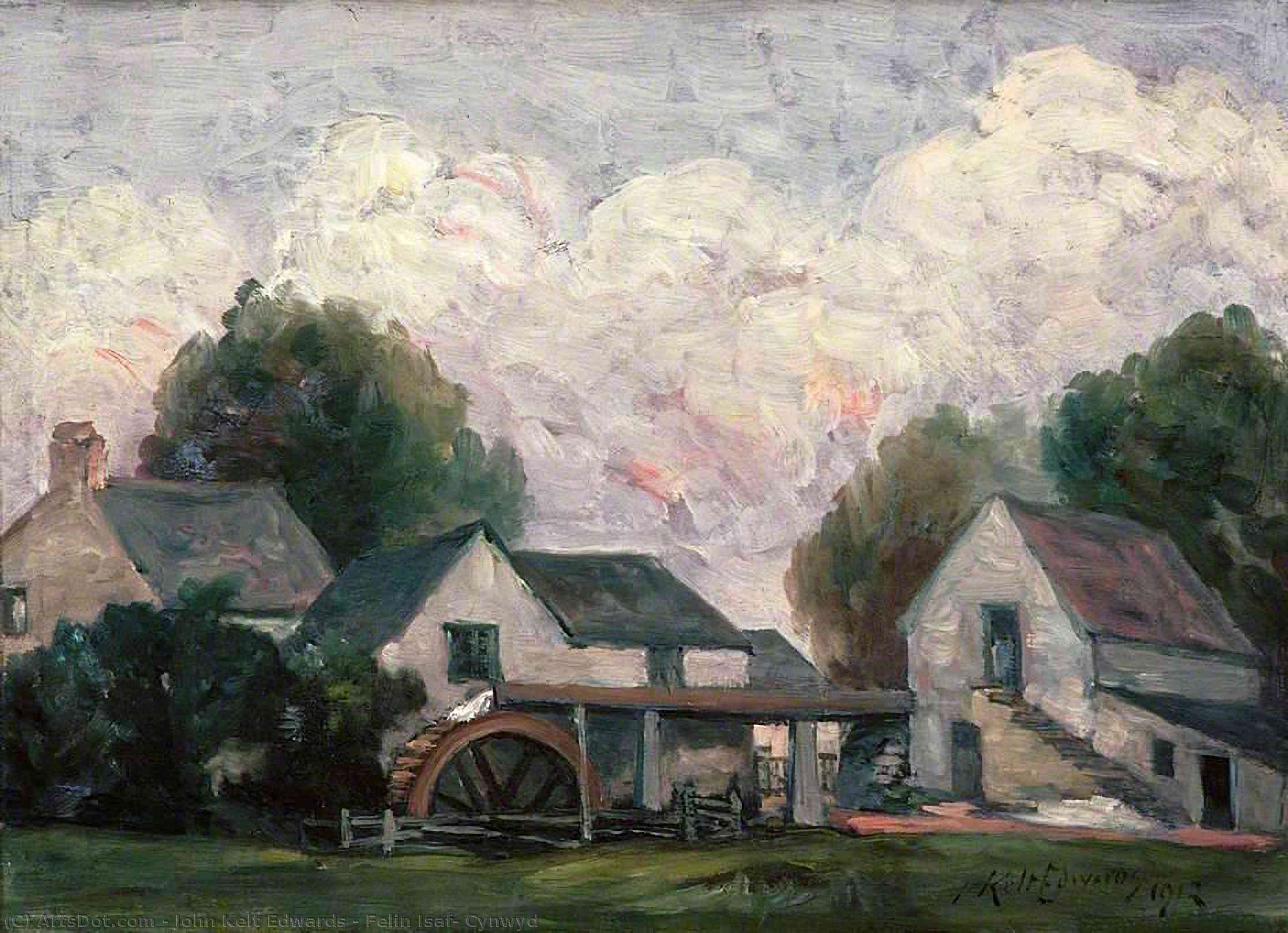
Felin Isaf, Cynwyd
