= Blaenau Ffestiniog =

Town in Gwynedd, North Wales

Coordinates: 52.994°N 3.939°W

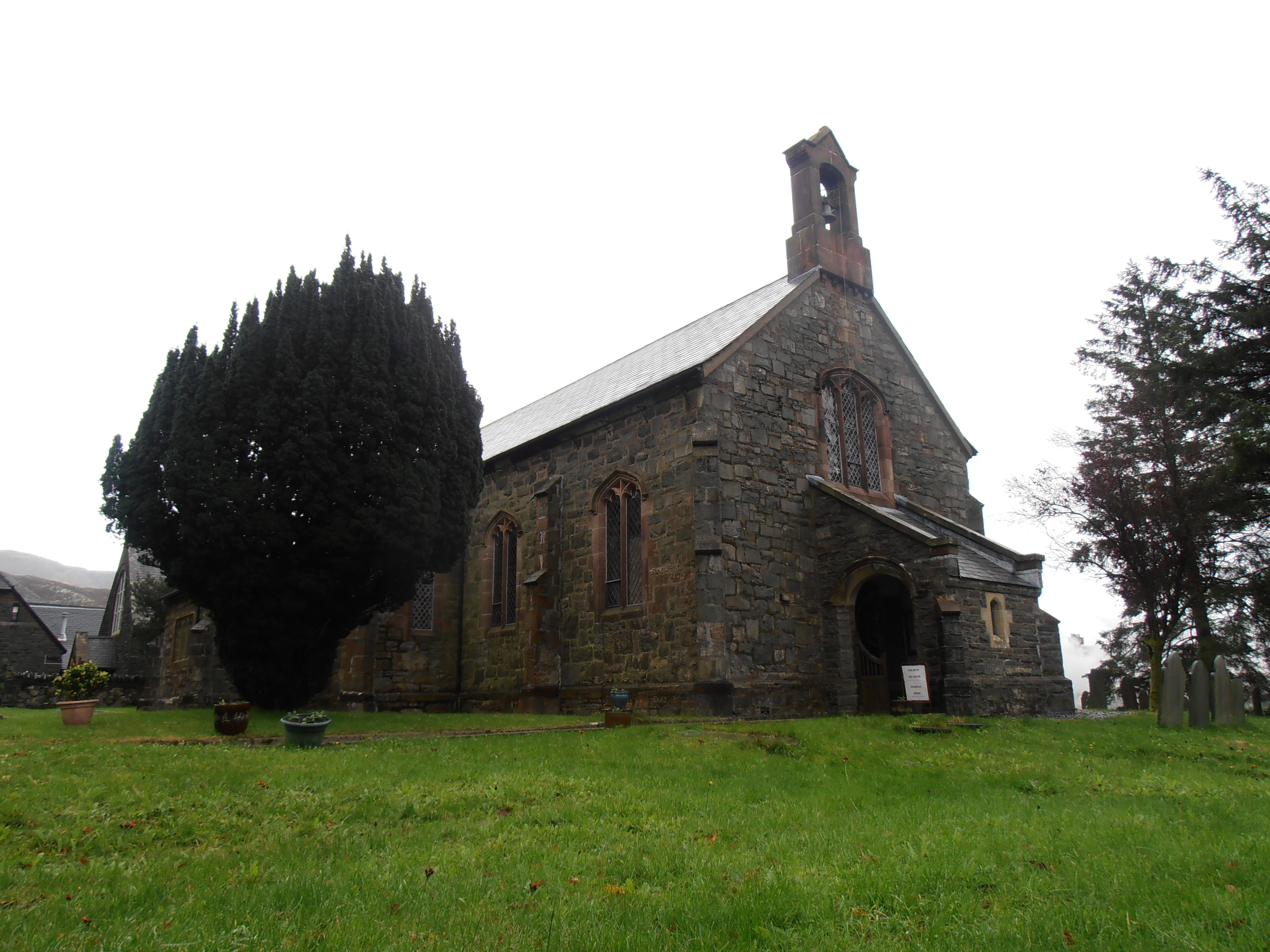
- St David's Church, Blaenau Ffestiniog, 2014

- Location within Gwynedd
- Population: 4,011 (2011)
- OS grid reference: SH705455
- Community: Ffestiniog
- Principal area: Gwynedd
- Preserved county: Gwynedd
- Country: Wales
- Sovereign state: United Kingdom
- Post town: Blaenau Ffestiniog
- Postcode district: LL41
- Dialling code: 01766
- Police: North Wales
- Fire: North Wales
- Ambulance: Welsh
- UK Parliament: Dwyfor Meirionnydd
- Senedd Cymru – Welsh Parliament: Gwynedd Maldwyn

Blaenau Ffestiniog (/ˈbleɪnaɪ fɛstˈɪnjɒɡ/ or /ˈblaɪnaɪ-/; Welsh pronunciation: [ˈbleɨ̯naɨ̯ fɛstˈɪnjɔɡ]) is a town in Gwynedd, Wales. Once a slate mining centre in historic Merionethshire, it now relies heavily on tourism, drawn to the Ffestiniog Railway and Llechwedd Slate Caverns. Its population reached 12,000 at the peak of the slate industry, and fell with the decline in demand for slate. The population of the community, including the nearby village Llan Ffestiniog, was 4,875 at the 2011 census – the fourth most populous in Gwynedd after Bangor, Caernarfon and Llandeiniolen. The population, not including Llan, is now about 4,000.

== Etymology and pronunciation ==
The meaning of Blaenau Ffestiniog is "uplands of Ffestiniog". The Welsh word blaenau is the plural of blaen "upland, remote region". Ffestiniog here is probably "territory of Ffestin" (Ffestin being a personal name) or could possibly mean "defensive place". The English pronunciation of Blaenau Ffestiniog suggested by the BBC Pronouncing Dictionary of British Names is /ˈblaɪnaɪ fɛsˈtɪnjɒɡ/, but the first word is pronounced [ˈbleɨna] in the area, reflecting features of the local Welsh dialect.

== History ==
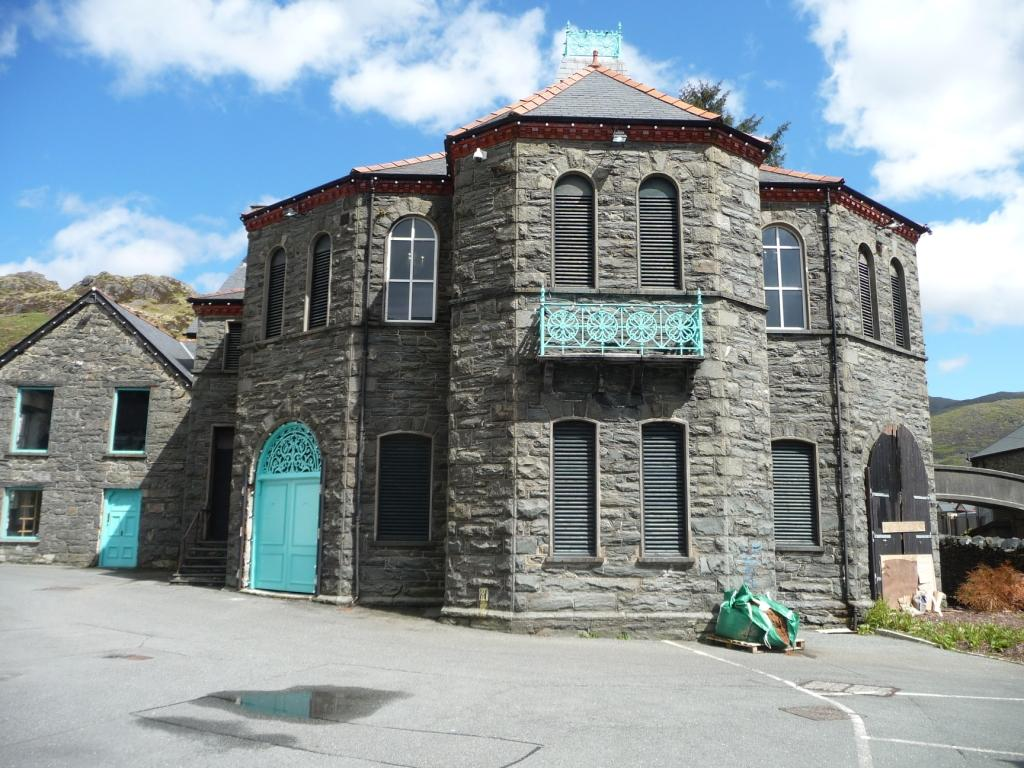
The Old Market Hall, 2015

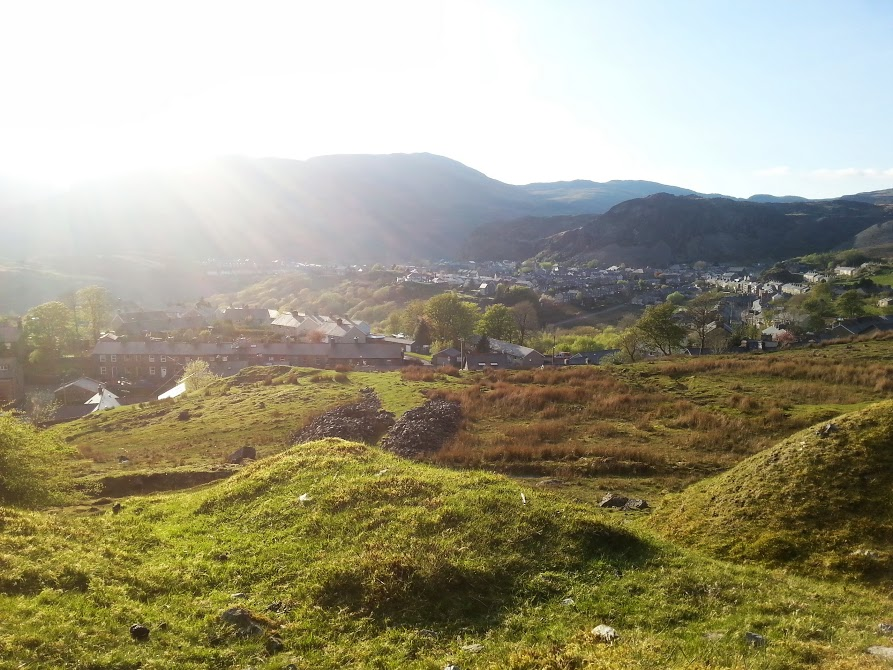
Looking down towards Blaenau Ffestiniog town in summer, 2013

=== Farming (before 1750) ===
Before the slate industry grew, Blaenau Ffestiniog was a farming region, with scattered farms working the uplands below the cliffs of Dolgaregddu and Nyth-y-Gigfran. A few of the historic farmhouses survive, at Cwm Bowydd, Neuadd Ddu, Gelli, Pen y Bryn and Cefn Bychan. Much of the land was owned by large estates.

=== Slate (1750–1850) ===
Blaenau Ffestiniog town arose to support workers in the local slate mines. At its peak, it was the largest in Merioneth. In 1765, two men from the long-established Cilgwyn quarry near Nantlle began quarrying in Ceunant y Diphwys, to the north-east of the present town. The valley had long been known for slate beds worked on a small scale. The original quarry was absorbed by subsequent mining, but it was probably at or near Diphwys Casson Quarry. Led by Methusalem Jones, eight Cilgwyn partners took a lease on Gelli Farm for their quarry. In 1800, William Turner and William Casson from the Lake District bought the lease and expanded production. Turner also owned Dorothea quarry in the Nantlle Valley, adjacent to Cilgwyn.

In 1819, quarrying began on slopes at Allt-fawr near Rhiwbryfdir Farm, on land owned by the Oakeley family from Tan y Bwlch. Within a decade, three slate quarries were operating on Allt-fawr. These amalgamated to form Oakeley Quarry, which became the largest underground slate mine in the world.

Quarrying grew fast in the earlier 19th century. Notable quarries opened at Llechwedd, Maenofferen and Votty & Bowydd, while Turner and Casson's Diphwys Casson flourished. Further off, Cwmorthin and Wrysgan quarries were dug to the south of the town, while at the head of Cwm Penmachno to the north-east, a series of quarries started at Rhiwbach, Cwt y Bugail and Blaen y Cwm. To the south-east another cluster worked the slopes of Manod Mawr. The workforce for these was drawn initially from nearby towns and villages such as Ffestiniog and Maentwrog. Before the arrival of railways, travel to the quarries was difficult and workers' houses were built nearby. These typically grew up round existing farms and roads between them. An early settlement was at Rhiwbryfdir, for the Oakeley and Llechwedd quarries. As early as 1801, new roads were built specifically for the quarries. By 1851, there were 3,460 people living in the new town of Blaenau Ffestiniog.

=== Urbanisation (1851–1900) ===
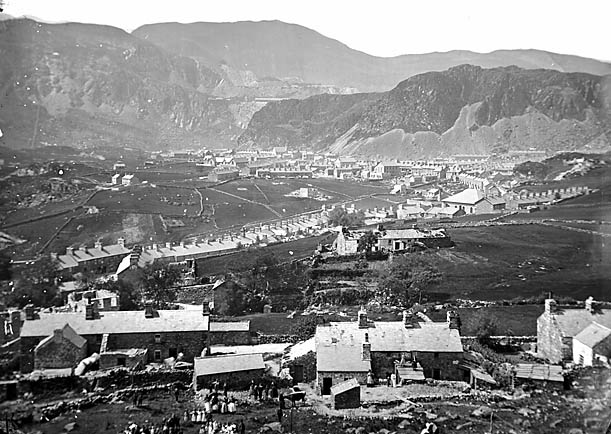
A view of Blaenau Ffestiniog from Graig Ddu, c. 1875; NLW3361243

During the 1860s and 1870s, the boom in the slate industry fed the nascent town of Blaenau Ffestiniog. It gained its first church and first school and saw much ribbon development along its roads. The Old Market Hall, which also served as the town hall, was completed in 1864. By 1881, its population had reached 11,274. In the 1890s, the slate industry experienced a sharp decline. A number of quarries lost money for the first time, and several failed entirely, including Cwmorthin and Nyth-y-Gigfran.

Blaenau Ffestiniog hosted the National Eisteddfod in 1898.

=== Slate decline (1901–1950) ===
The slate industry recovered only partly from the recession of the 1890s. Many quarrymen joined the armed force in World War I and production fell. There was a short post-war boom, but the long-term trend was towards mass-produced tiles and cheaper slate sourced from Spain. Oakeley Quarry took over Cwmorthin, Votty & Bowydd and Diphwys Casson, while Llechwedd acquired Maenofferen. Despite that consolidation, the decline continued. World War II brought a further loss of workforce. In 1946, the Ffestiniog Railway closed.

=== Since 1945 ===
In August 1945, the secluded farmhouse of Bwlch Ocyn at Manod, belonging to Clough Williams-Ellis, became the home of the writer Arthur Koestler and his wife Mamaine for three years. While there, Koestler became a close friend of his fellow writer George Orwell.

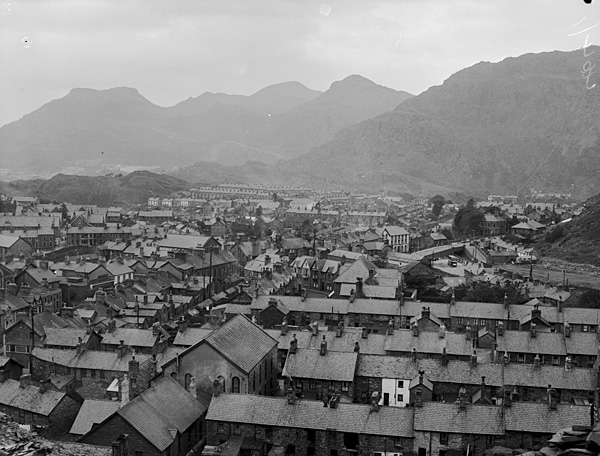
Blaenau Ffestiniog, 1959

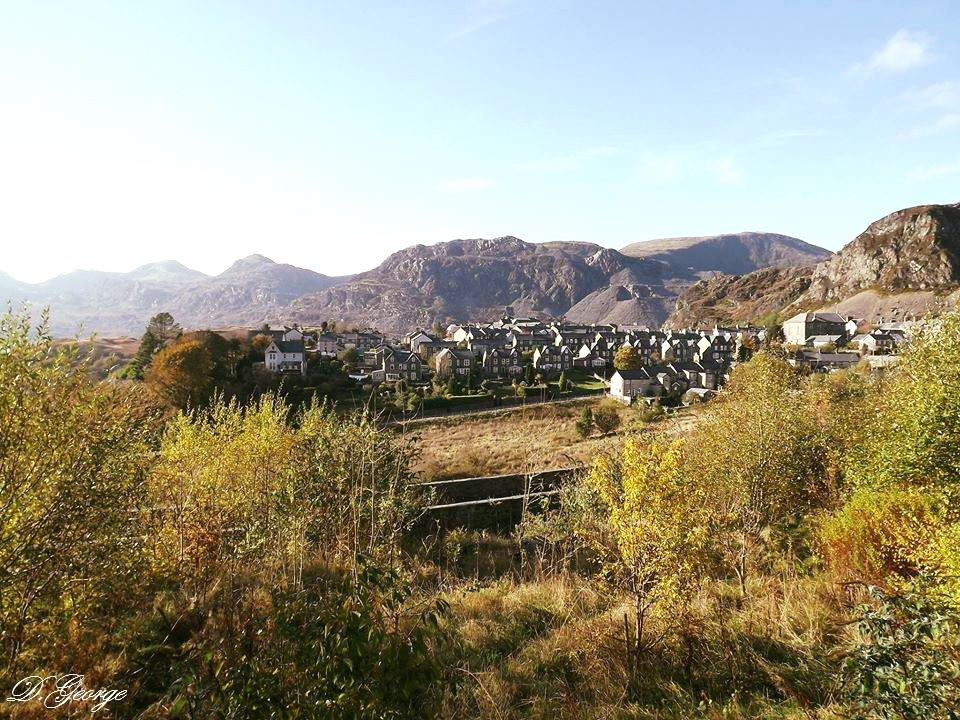
Blaenau Ffestiniog in the autumn, 2014

The remaining quarries served by the Rhiwbach Tramway closed in the 1950s and 1960s. Oakeley closed in 1970, with the loss of many jobs. The quarry re-opened in 1974 on a much smaller scale and continued to be worked until 2010. Maenofferen and Llechwedd continued, but Maenofferen finally closed in 1998. Llechwedd is still a working quarry, working the David Jones part of Maenofferen (level two-and-a-half).

As the slate industry shrank, so did the population of the community of Ffestiniog, which fell to 4,875 in 2011. Tourism became the town's largest employer, with the development of Gloddfa Ganol in the Oakeley quarry and the slate caverns at Llechwedd quarry. The revived Ffestiniog Railway and the slate caverns remain popular attractions, as does the Antur Stiniog downhill mountain-biking centre and, more recently, the Zip World Titan zip-line site, which includes the Bounce Below slate-mine activity centre.

== Geography ==
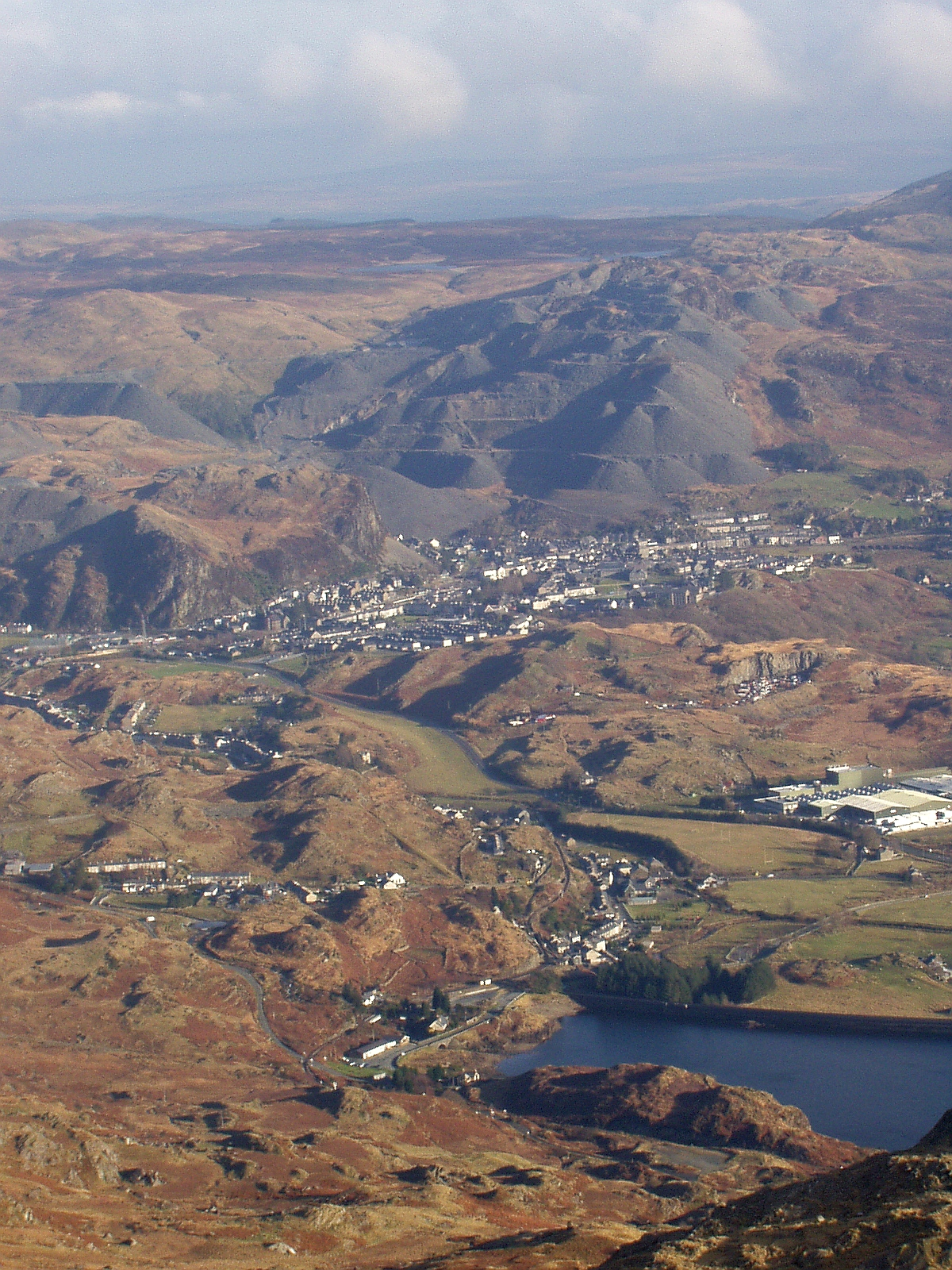
Blaenau Ffestiniog, seen from Moelwyn Bach, showing the large waste heaps that dominate the town, 2005

Some local villages, notably Tanygrisiau and Manod, are sometimes seen as parts of Blaenau Ffestiniog.

Although the town is in the centre of the Snowdonia National Park, the boundaries exclude it and its substantial slate-waste heaps. There were proposals in 2010 for the town to become part of the national park.

Blaenau Ffestiniog has one of the highest rainfalls in Wales. It has several reservoirs, one of which supplies the Ffestiniog Power Station. Stwlan Dam lies between two of the mountains in the area, Moelwyn Bach and Moelwyn Mawr. The mountains round the town form a watershed between the River Lledr flowing north as a tributary of the River Conwy and the River Dwyryd flowing west.

== Education ==
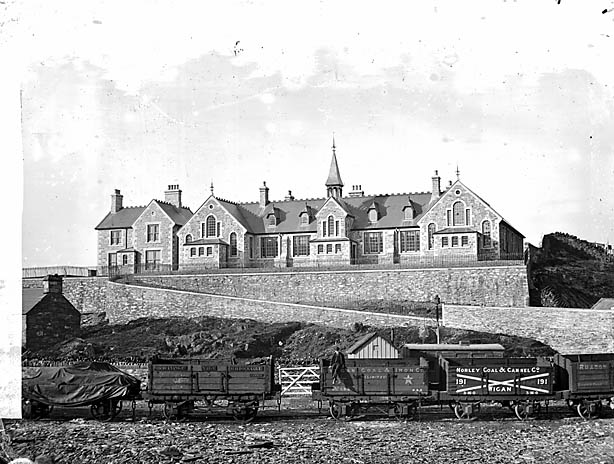
Glan-y-pwll School, c. 1895

Ysgol y Moelwyn is the main secondary school, covering Blaenau, Manod, Tanygrisiau, Llan Ffestiniog, Trawsfynydd, Gellilydan, Maentwrog and stretching into the Vale of Ffestiniog and Dolwyddelan. It had 309 pupils in 2016. Some pupils travel to neighbouring towns.

There are five primary schools in the area.

== Welsh language ==
Most Blaenau Ffestiniog people habitually speak Welsh. At the 2011 census, 78.6 per cent over the age of three said they could speak it, as against 80.9 per cent at the 2001 census. The latest inspection reports of the town's primary schools, Ysgol Maenofferen and Ysgol Y Manod, both in 2016, put the proportion of pupils speaking Welsh at home at 87 and 85 per cent. At the town's secondary school, Ysgol y Moelwyn, 82 per cent of pupils came from Welsh-speaking homes in 2014, making its Welsh-speaking intake the highest among secondary schools in the former county of Meirionnydd and fourth highest among those in Gwynedd.

== Transport ==
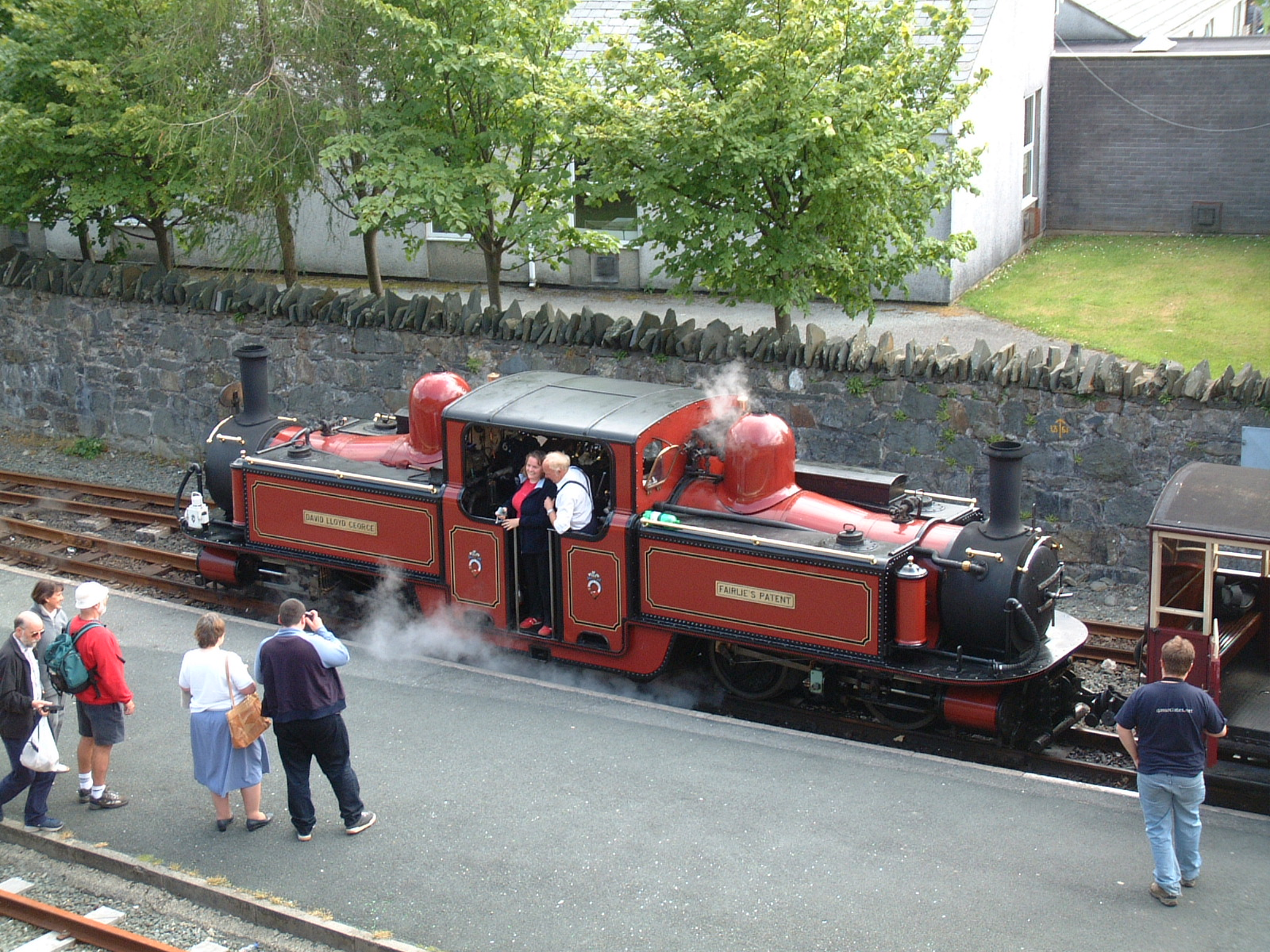
Double Fairlie locomotive David Lloyd George at Blaenau Ffestiniog station, 2004

The main access to Blaenau Ffestiniog is the A470 road north to Llandudno and south to Dolgellau and beyond. The A496 runs south to the coastal resorts of Harlech and Barmouth and connects with the A487 towards Porthmadog and the Llŷn Peninsula. Just north of the town, the A470 climbs steeply to the Crimea Pass and meets the A5 at Betws-y-Coed, giving access to Llangollen, Wrexham and Shrewsbury in the east and Bangor and Holyhead in the west.

Town bus services are mainly provided by Arriva Buses Wales and Llew Jones, with routes to Porthmadog, Dolgellau, Llandudno via Betws-y-Coed and Llanrwst. Town circular services via Tanygrisiau are operated hourly on weekdays by John's Coaches.

Blaenau Ffestiniog railway station, on the site of the former Great Western station, is used by the Ffestiniog Railway and the Conwy Valley line, replacing their previous stations. The Conwy Valley line runs to the North Wales coast at Llandudno Junction, with links to Chester, Holyhead and Manchester.

At various times the town has been the terminus for four independent railway lines, each with its own station or stations:

- The Ffestiniog Railway
- The Festiniog & Blaenau Railway
- The Conwy Valley line of the London & North Western Railway
- The Bala Ffestiniog Line of the Great Western Railway

== Tourism ==
Blaenau Ffestiniog's tourist attractions include the Ffestiniog Railway and the Llechwedd Slate Caverns, a former slate mine open to visitors. Llechwedd is often placed among Wales's top five visitor attractions. Near Blaenau Ffestiniog there are miles of mountain landscape with derelict quarries, rivers, various lakes and walking routes.

Several mountain biking trails have been created, some suitable for competitions. Bikes are available for hire.

== Regeneration/Rebranding ==
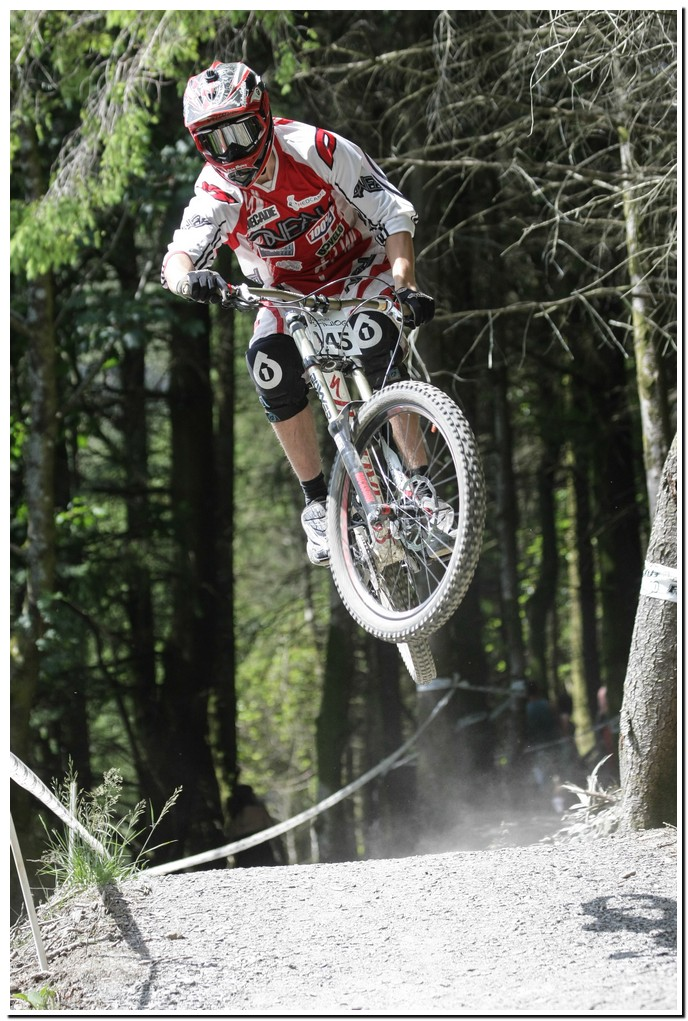
Cyclist on one of the new 'Antur Stiniog' tracks, 2013

The town centre has recently been regenerated, thanks to funding from organisations, grants, and £4.5 million from the Welsh Government. A new bus station has been built along with new viewing areas for neighbouring mountain ranges. Several slate structures have been built with poetry engraved on them. These are about 40 feet (12 m) tall and intended to respond visually to the slate hills and mountains. Poetry and local sayings have also been engraved on slate bands set in pavements in the town centre.

Various walkways have been installed, and a series of downhill mountain biking trails by Antur Stiniog. A kilometre-long zip-wire has been erected at Llechwedd Slate Caverns, which is popular with thrill-seekers.

If plans go ahead, Blaenau Ffestiniog will have the UK's first vélo-rail, which is popular in France.

== Arts ==
Many artists come to Blaenau Ffestiniog for the landscape around it, perhaps inspired by the harshness of the slate tips. They include Kyffin Williams and David Nash.

During the Second World War, the National Gallery stored art treasures in one of the mines in the town, to protect them from damage or destruction. The large steel gates are still standing preserving the paintings that remain in the caverns.

=== Music ===
Blaenau Ffestiniog has a strong musical tradition from quarrying days, ranging from the Caban, male voice choirs and brass bands, to jazz and dance bands like The New Majestics, popular rock bands of the 1980s and 1990s, such as Llwybr Llaethog and Anweledig, and more recent bands such as Gai Toms, Frizbee and Gwibdaith Hen Frân. The local alternative-music training school Gwallgofiaid has over a dozen bands at its centre at the Old Police Station in Park Square, served by five rehearsal rooms, a 24-track studio and Cwrt performance space.

== Notable people ==
In birth date order:

- Llywelyn the Great (c. 1173–1240), King of Gwynedd, was born at nearby Dolwyddelan Castle
- William Edward Oakeley (1828–1912), the owner of the Oakeley Quarry
- John Cowper Powys (1872–1963), philosopher, novelist, critic and poet, lived in Blaenau Ffestiniog from 1955 on.
- Richard Roberts (1874–1945), Canadian Christian theologian and pacifist
- John Kelt Edwards (1875–1934), artist and cartoonist.
- Margarette Golding (1881–1939), founder of International Inner Wheel, a women's voluntary service association.
- Sir Idwal Pugh (1918–2010), senior civil servant and Parliamentary and Health Service Ombudsman.
- Gwyn Thomas (1936–2016), poet, academic, National Poet for Wales in 2006–2008, brought up in the town.
- Eigra Lewis Roberts (1939–2026), writer, playwright and poet.
- David Nash (born 1945), artist and sculptor, spent childhood holidays in Ffestiniog.
- Dave Felgate (born 1960), footballer.
- Gai Toms (born 1976), music artist, was raised in the adjacent Merionethshire hamlet of Tanygrisiau.
- Llwybr Llaethog (founded 1985), hip-hop musical group
- Anweledig (founded 1992), funk and reggae musical group

== Twinning ==
Blaenau Ffestiniog is twinned with Rawson in Argentina.

== See also ==
- Ffestiniog Memorial Hospital
