= Ysgol y Moelwyn =

Coordinates: 52.9918°N 3.9380°W

Location
- Wynne Road; Blaenau Ffestiniog; Gwynedd, LL41 3DW; Wales

Information
- Motto: Amser Dyn yw ei Gynysgaeth (A man's time is his endowment)
- Established: 1895
- Chair: Bini Jones
- Headmistress: Eleri Moss
- Staff: 41
- Language: Welsh

Ysgol y Moelwyn is a Welsh-medium secondary school in Blaenau Ffestiniog, Gwynedd, Wales.

The school provides education to students aged 11–16, in Key Stage 3 and Key Stage 4, giving them GCSE qualifications.

The school serves Ffestiniog and the surrounding area, including Trawsfynydd. Although the area is considered deprived, the school has a record of providing standard education compared to other schools.

At the school, students are assigned to one of four houses: Bowydd, Prysor, Cynfal, or Dwyryd.
