= Slate industry in Spain =

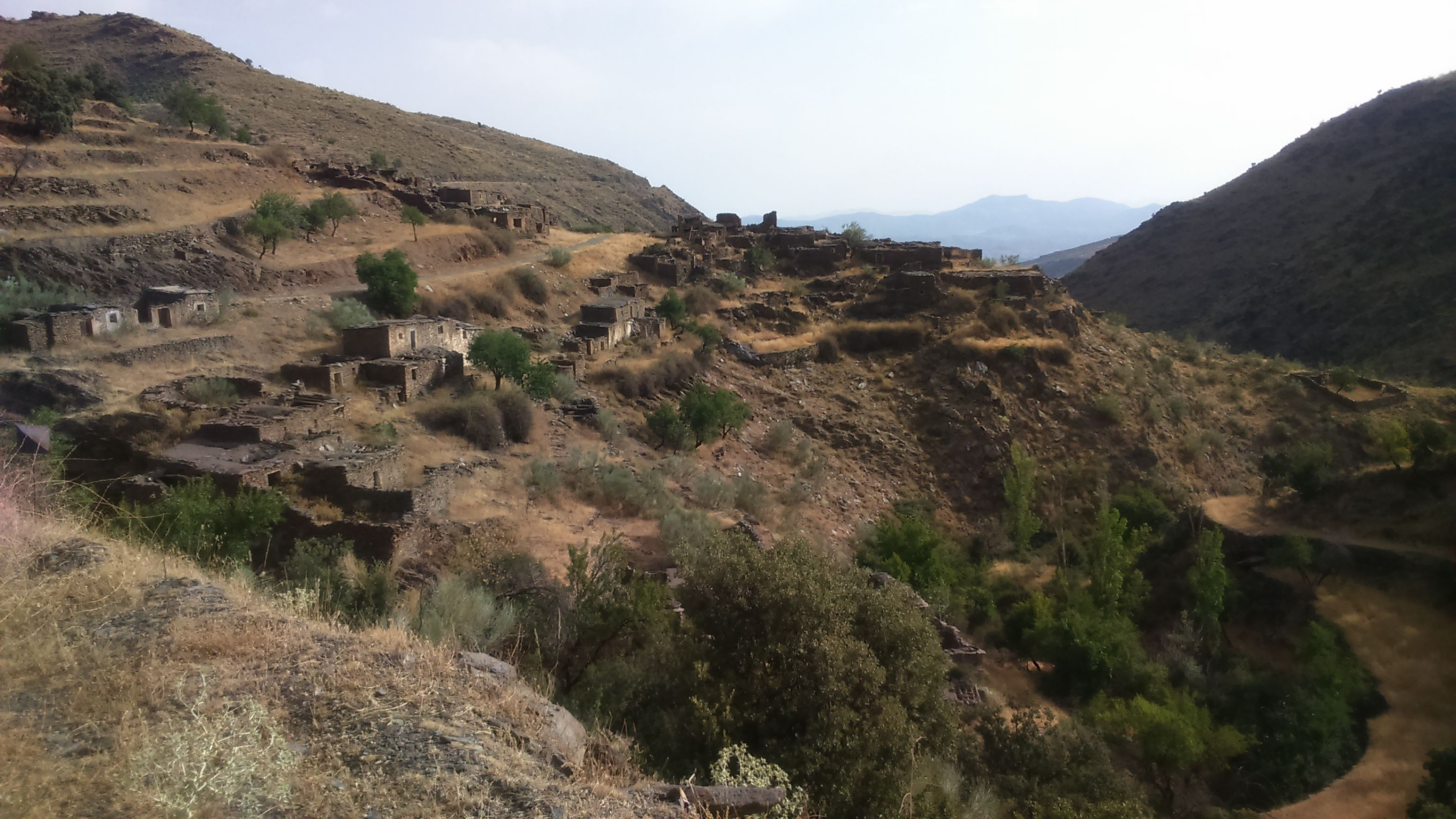
Los Marcos, Alcóntar

90% of Europe's natural slate used for roofing originates from the slate industry in Spain, with the region of Galicia being the primary source of production.

Slate is a fine-grained metamorphic rock that splits into thin, smooth-surfaced layers. Metamorphic rock is rock which was once igneous or sedimentary and has been subsequently subjected to heat and pressure in varying degrees thereby altering its composition, structure and appearance. It is used extensively in the building industry, particularly for roofing tiles. The production of slate is estimated at 4 million tons per year.

== Geography of Galicia ==
Galicia is situated on the North West coast of Spain, just above Portugal, and is subdivided into the four provinces of A Coruña, Pontevedra, Lugo and Ourense.

The main areas of slate production are:-

- Valdeorras – the larger slate production companies are concentrated in this area of Orense
- Quiroga – is the second largest production area, situated on the province of Lugo
- Ortigueira – in A Coruña
- Mondoñedo – including Mondoñedo, A Pastoriza and Lourenzá in Lugo

== Spanish slate geology ==
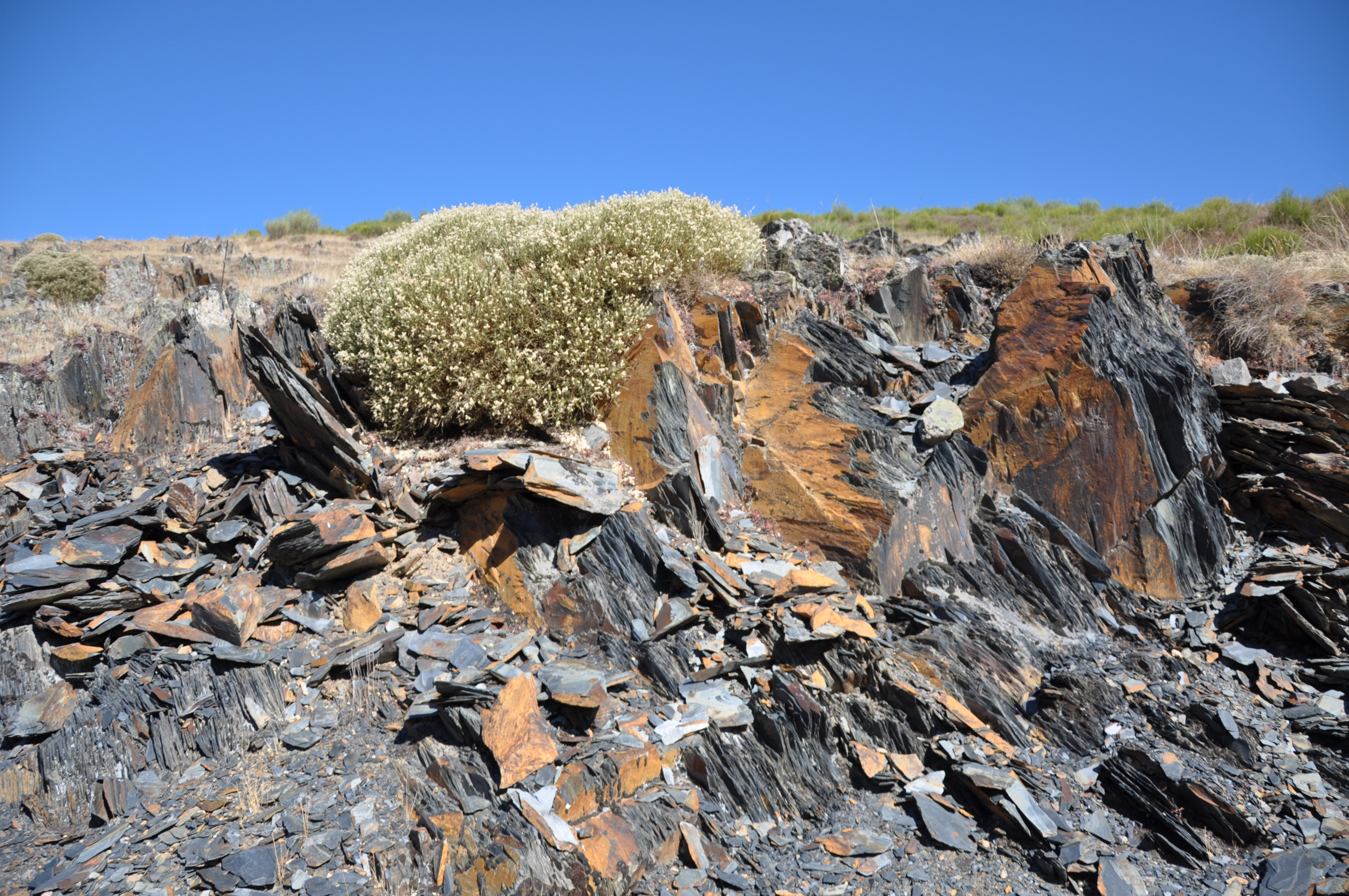
Slates and Echinospartum in Teleno, Corporales, León, Spain

The Northern region of Spain has been subjected to periods of magmatic activity with volcanism, and this has led to the region's unique geological development in respect of slate.

Slate deposits are over 500 million years old, having been formed during the Cambrian, Ordovician and Silurian periods of the Palaeozoic era.

Essentially, slate forms when the clay minerals in shale are put under increased pressure with high temperatures. The clay starts to revert to the mica minerals which cause the rock to grow hard with pronounced cleavage) directions. It is this cleavage which enables slate to be broken along flat, even planes.

A large variety of colours and textures of slate can be produced, and the final product depends largely on the tectonic environment, the source of the sedimentary material, and the physical/chemical conditions prevalent during the sedimentation process.

As the sedimentary deposits were compacted, water was squeezed out, hence turning clay minerals into mica, and then solid mudstone. The subsequent mountain building compaction which occurred over the next few million years resulted in an even stronger rearrangement and planar orientation of the minerals. This means that in true slate the cleavage plane is very different from the original bedding plane and led to the well developed cleavage for which the region is famous.

== Extraction of Spanish slate ==
The Galician slate industry is a major employer in the region and in the main slate is extracted from surface quarries. The process is as follows:

1. Geological surveys locate areas of potential slate extraction
2. Samples are taken to allow the purity and quality of the slate to be verified.
3. The quarry area is established, and any unusable material (“overburden”) is removed.
4. Diamond beaded steel cutting cables are used to saw large blocks from the quarry.
5. These blocks are transferred to the production centre to be sawn into regular smaller blocks, using their natural cleavage planes.
6. Skilled craftsmen grade the blocks according to quality and thickness, after having split them to a predetermined size.
7. After final quality control measures, slates are packed into crates, often with batch information so that future matches will be possible for longer term ongoing projects.

== Properties of Spanish slate ==
Since slate is a naturally occurring product, different kinds of slate are subject to varying chemical and mineral compositions, determined largely by the geological characteristics of the quarry from which it was mined.

An important use of Spanish slate is as a roofing material, often being specified by building professionals as a result of its aesthetic appearance and durability characteristics. Slate is particularly suitable as a roofing material as it has an extremely low water absorption index of less than 0.4%. Its low tendency to absorb water also makes it very resistant to frost damage and breakage due to freezing.

== Slate certification ==
Laminations due to alternating layers of limonite and mudstone Scale x25

No laminations present in layers with a high quartz and feldspar content Scale x 25

The nature of slate as a natural organic product results in a wide variety of qualities being available worldwide. An important way of determining the differences, and degree of quality, is through the use of country certification, or quality marks.

The CE mark certifies that a product has met the EU requirements for consumer safety, health and environmental issues. All Spanish Slate bears this mark.

There are further national and international standards that can be applicable to slate, and give information as to the quality levels reached. Some of these are:-

- NF mark from France
- BS EN 12326-2:200
- IQNET and ISO 9001:2000
- AFNOR
- AFAQ

== Using Spanish slate on roofs ==
Typically Spanish slate tiles are fixed using a hook fixing method, as opposed to the more predominant nail fixing used elsewhere in the world. The benefits of hook fixing are

- There is no need to create a hole in the tile, which can sometimes weaken the slate.
- Narrower tiles can be used and hence this makes it easier for the roofer to create roof features such as valleys and domes.
- Hook fixing is particularly suitable in regions subject to severe weather conditions, such as Scotland and parts of Wales, since there is a greater resistance to wind uplift as the lower edge of the slate is secured.

== Environmental implications ==
Dr Joan Walsh, a consultant geologist, writes in her article “Natural Slate: a Green Roofing Medium”, that natural slate offers strong benefits over other roofing materials in terms of carbon emissions and reduced environmental impact.

In addition, the quarrying of Spanish slate does not involve any chemical processes, and usually only local water is used to keep cutting machinery cool.

After quarrying regional authorities often dictate that the landscape is returned as much as possible to its original state, and waste rock left as part of the extraction process is returned adjacent to the quarry. But often waste rock is abandoned near small villages, riversides or even burying many historical heritage sites.
