= Y Gamallt =

Hill (288m) in Gwynedd, Wales

Coordinates: 53.01655°N 3.91549°W

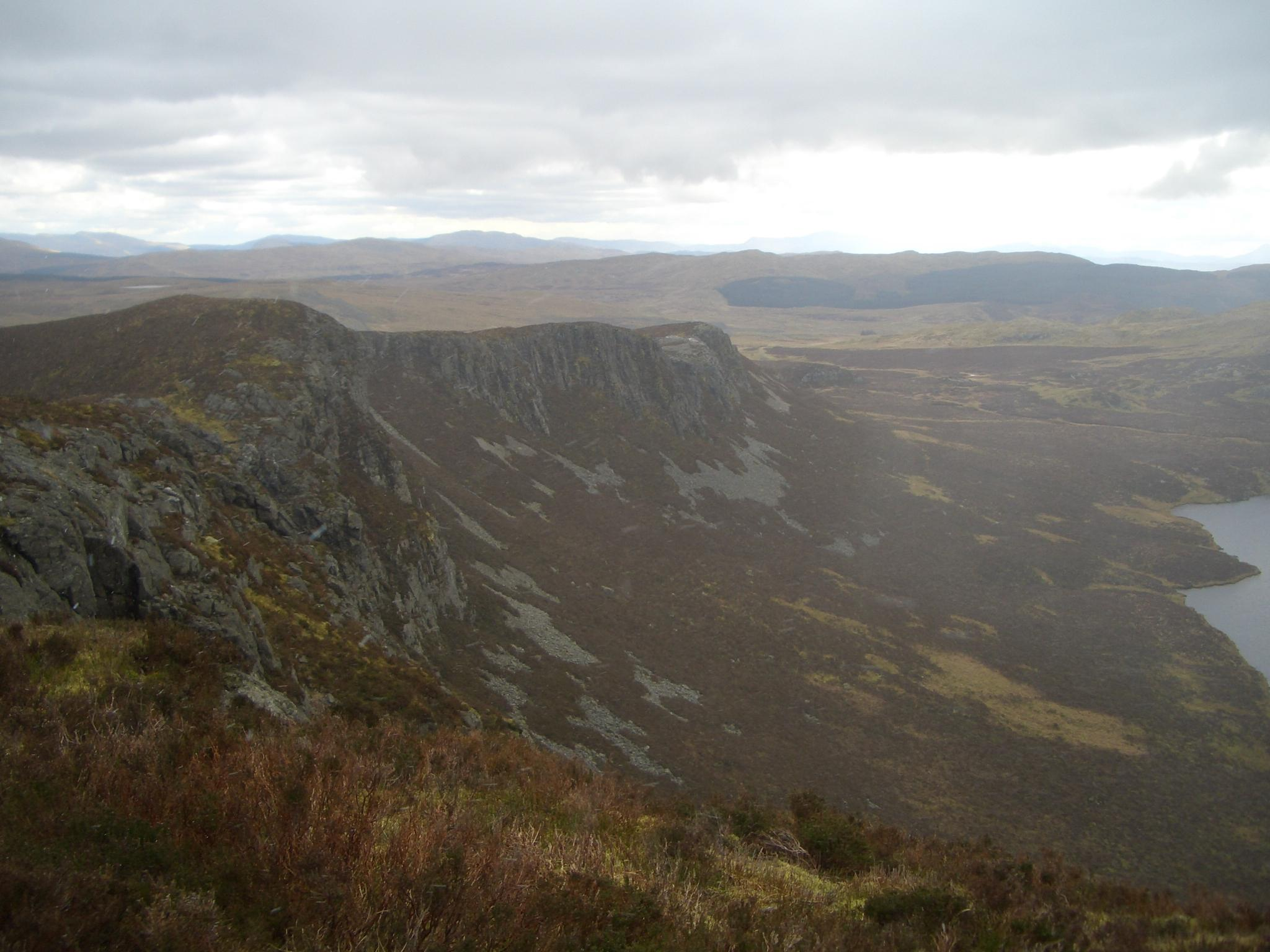
- Looking south from the summit. Foel Boeth (left) and Graig Wen (right)

Highest point
- Elevation: 588 m (1,929 ft)
- Prominence: 122 m (400 ft)
- Listing: Dewey, HuMP

Geography
- Location: Gwynedd, Wales
- Parent range: Arenigs
- OS grid: SH716483
- Topo map: OS Landranger 115

Y Gamallt is a mountain located in the Migneint in Snowdonia, North Wales. It forms part of the Arenig mountain range being separated from the Moelwynion range at the head of Cwm Teigl.

The mountain has cliffs on its entire western side, Graig goch, dropping down to the twin lakes of Llynnau Gamallt. These cliffs are home to several rock climbs, albeit unpopular due to the quality of the rock. The summit, also known as Graig Goch, has a shelter cairn, with views of Moel Penamnen, Manod Mawr, Manod Mawr North Top, Carnedd y Filiast (Cerrigydrudion), Arenig Fach, Arenig Fawr, Moel Llyfnant, Moelwyn Bach and its close neighbours of Y Garnedd and Graig Wen.
