= Moel y Garnedd =

Hill in Gwynedd, North Wales

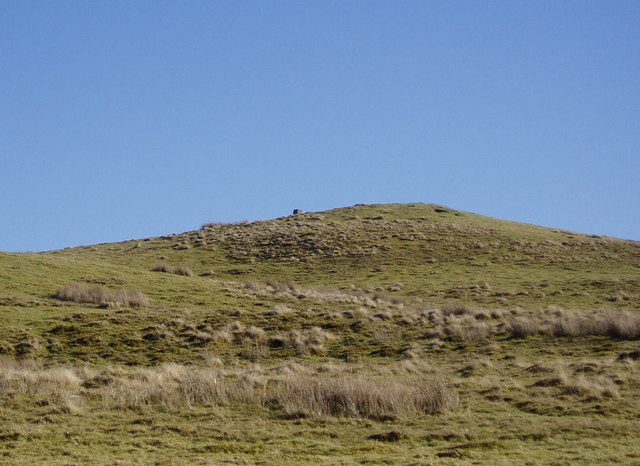

Highest point
- Elevation: 360 m (1,180 ft)
- Prominence: 85 m (279 ft)
- Parent peak: Arenig Fawr
- Listing: TuMP
- Coordinates: 52.9057047°N 3.6424152°W

Naming
- English translation: Bare Hill of the Cairn
- Language of name: Welsh

Geography
- Location: Gwynedd, Wales
- Parent range: Arenigs
- OS grid: SH896355
- Topo map: OS Landranger 124 / "Explorer" OL18

Moel y Garnedd (Welsh for 'bare hill of the Cairn') is a hill within the Snowdonia National Park in Gwynedd, North Wales.

== Location and Summit View ==
Moel y Garnedd is a member of the Arenig range, with Arenig Fawr lying approximately 4 miles (6.4 km) to the west. It is the high point of an area of moorland known as the Gwastadros. On a clear day Snowdon and the Glyderau can be seen in a gap near Arenig Fach and Mynydd Nodol, 21 miles (34 km) away. Carnedd y Filiast, Moel y Gydros and Moel Emoel are to the north / northeast, with the more distant Mwdwl-eithin on the Denbigh Moors peeking over the horizon, 12 miles (19 km) away. To the east are the Clwydian Range summits of Moel y Gamelin and Moel Morfydd, along with Cyrn-y-Brain, a spur of Esclusham Mountain of which its twin radio towers are just discernible 22 miles (35 km) away on a clear day. Cadair Berwyn and Llyn Tegid (Bala Lake) are to the east / southeast, and to the southwest is Aran Benllyn, Cadair Idris and Dduallt. The furthest feature visible is Fron Hafod hill, within the Llandegla Forest, 22 miles (35 km) distant.

== Ascent ==
A scenic route to the summit begins in nearby Bala and takes approximately two to three hours for a round trip. The summit is marked by an Ordnance Survey trig point.
