= Arenigs =

Cluster of mountains near Dolgellau, Wales

Arenigs is an informal term for a group of mountains in central Snowdonia, in north Wales. They are not strictly defined, but normally include at least the following peaks:

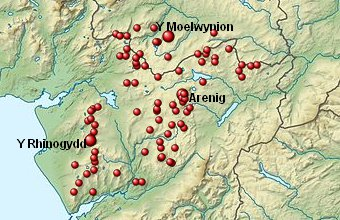
The Arenigs, the Rhiniogydd and the Moelwynion

Between Barmouth, Betws-y-Coed and Bala
| Name of Peak | OS grid reference | Geographical coordinates |
|---|---|---|
| Arenig Fach | SH820415 | 52.957°N, 3.758°W |
| Arenig Fawr | SH827369 | 52.916°N, 3.745°W |
| Arenig Fawr (S top) | SH827359 | 52.907°N, 3.745°W |
| Arenig Fawr (S top) | SH826366 | 52.913°N, 3.747°W |
| Bryn-mawr | SH801442 | 52.981°N, 3.787°W |
| Bryn-pig | SH766306 | 52.858°N, 3.834°W |
| Carnedd Iago | SH782406 | 52.948°N, 3.814°W |
| Carnedd Llechwedd-llyfn (Llechwedd-llyfn) | SH857446 | 52.986°N, 3.704°W |
| Carreg y Diocyn | SH831363 | 52.911°N, 3.739°W |
| Cerrig y Ieirch (Moel Llechwedd-gwyn) | SH758425 | 52.965°N, 3.850°W |
| Craig Dolfudr | SH828310 | 52.863°N, 3.742°W |
| Craig Dolfudr N top | SH822317 | 52.869°N, 3.751°W |
| Craig y Benglog (Moel Cae'r-defaid) | SH805244 | 52.803°N, 3.774°W |
| Craig yr Hafod | SH888437 | 52.979°N, 3.657°W |
| Cynefin Bryn Blew (W top) | SH784254 | 52.812°N, 3.805°W |
| Dduallt | SH810273 | 52.830°N, 3.767°W |
| Ffridd yr Allt-llwyd | SH797296 | 52.850°N, 3.787°W |
| Foel Boeth | SH779342 | 52.891°N, 3.816°W |
| Foel Cynwch | SH736211 | 52.772°N, 3.875°W |
| Foel Fawr (Mynydd Maentwrog) | SH726394 | 52.936°N, 3.897°W |
| Foel Goch | SH953422 | 52.966°N, 3.560°W |
| Foel Offrwm | SH749209 | 52.771°N, 3.855°W |
| Foel Ystrodur Fawr | SH814340 | 52.890°N, 3.764°W |
| Foel-boeth | SH864430 | 52.972°N, 3.693°W |
| Gallt y Daren | SH778344 | 52.893°N, 3.817°W |
| Garn Prys | SH887483 | 53.020°N, 3.660°W |
| Garnedd Fawr | SH937423 | 52.967°N, 3.584°W |
| Graig Ddu | SH888429 | 52.971°N, 3.657°W |
| Graig Wen | SH739394 | 52.937°N, 3.877°W |
| Moel Cae'r-defaid (W peak) | SH800246 | 52.805°N, 3.781°W |
| Moel Emoel | SH937402 | 52.948°N, 3.583°W |
| Moel Hafodowen | SH754266 | 52.822°N, 3.850°W |
| Moel Llechwedd | SH829372 | 52.919°N, 3.743°W |
| Moel Llyfnant | SH808351 | 52.900°N, 3.773°W |
| Moel Oernant | SH742340 | 52.888°N, 3.871°W |
| Moel y Feidiog | SH781324 | 52.875°N, 3.812°W |
| Moel y Gydros | SH914453 | 52.993°N, 3.619°W |
| Moel Ymenyn | SH839346 | 52.896°N, 3.727°W |
| Moel yr Wden (Bwlch y Bi) | SH780356 | 52.903°N, 3.815°W |
| Mynydd Bryn-llech | SH805314 | 52.866°N, 3.776°W |
| Mynydd Nodol | SH865393 | 52.939°N, 3.690°W |
| Orddu | SH963423 | 52.967°N, 3.545°W |
| Pen y Bwlch Gwyn | SH932411 | 52.956°N, 3.591°W |
| Rhobell Fawr | SH786256 | 52.814°N, 3.802°W |
| Rhobell Ganol | SH785274 | 52.830°N, 3.804°W |
| Rhobell-y-big | SH782282 | 52.837°N, 3.809°W |
| Waun Garnedd-y-Filiast | SH874452 | 52.992°N, 3.678°W |
