= Moel Emoel =

Mountain in Wales

Highest point
- Elevation: 549 m (1,801 ft)
- Prominence: 88 m (289 ft)
- Parent peak: Foel Goch
- Listing: Dewey
- Coordinates: 52.949159°N 3.582153°W

Naming
- English translation: Bare Hill of Emoel
- Language of name: Welsh

Geography
- Location: Gwynedd, Wales
- Parent range: Arenigs
- OS grid: SH937402
- Topo map: OS Landranger 125 / "Explorer" OL18

Moel Emoel (Welsh for 'bare hill of Emoel') is a hill within the Snowdonia National Park in Gwynedd, North Wales.

== Location ==
Moel Emoel is a member of the Arenig range with Arenig Fawr lying approximately 7 miles (11 km) to the west. Llyn Celyn can easily be seen between Arenig Fach and Mynydd Nodol. Its parent peak, Foel Goch is 2 miles (3.2 km) northeast, and to the east, the broad ridge of the Berwyn range with Cadair Berwyn lying 10 miles (16 km) away. On a clear day the view southwest towards the nearby town of Bala, 3 miles (4.8 km) away is spectacular. Llyn Tegid (Bala Lake), Aran Benllyn and the distant Cadair Idris form a fine vista. The furthest peak visible is Tarrenhendre, 28 miles (45 km) away near Abergynolwyn.

== Ascent ==
The main route to the summit begins just outside of Bala and takes approximately 3.4 to 4 hours for a round trip. The summit is marked by stone cairn.
