= Y Ro Wen =

Hill in Conwy County Borough, Wales

Coordinates: 53.01655°N 3.91549°W

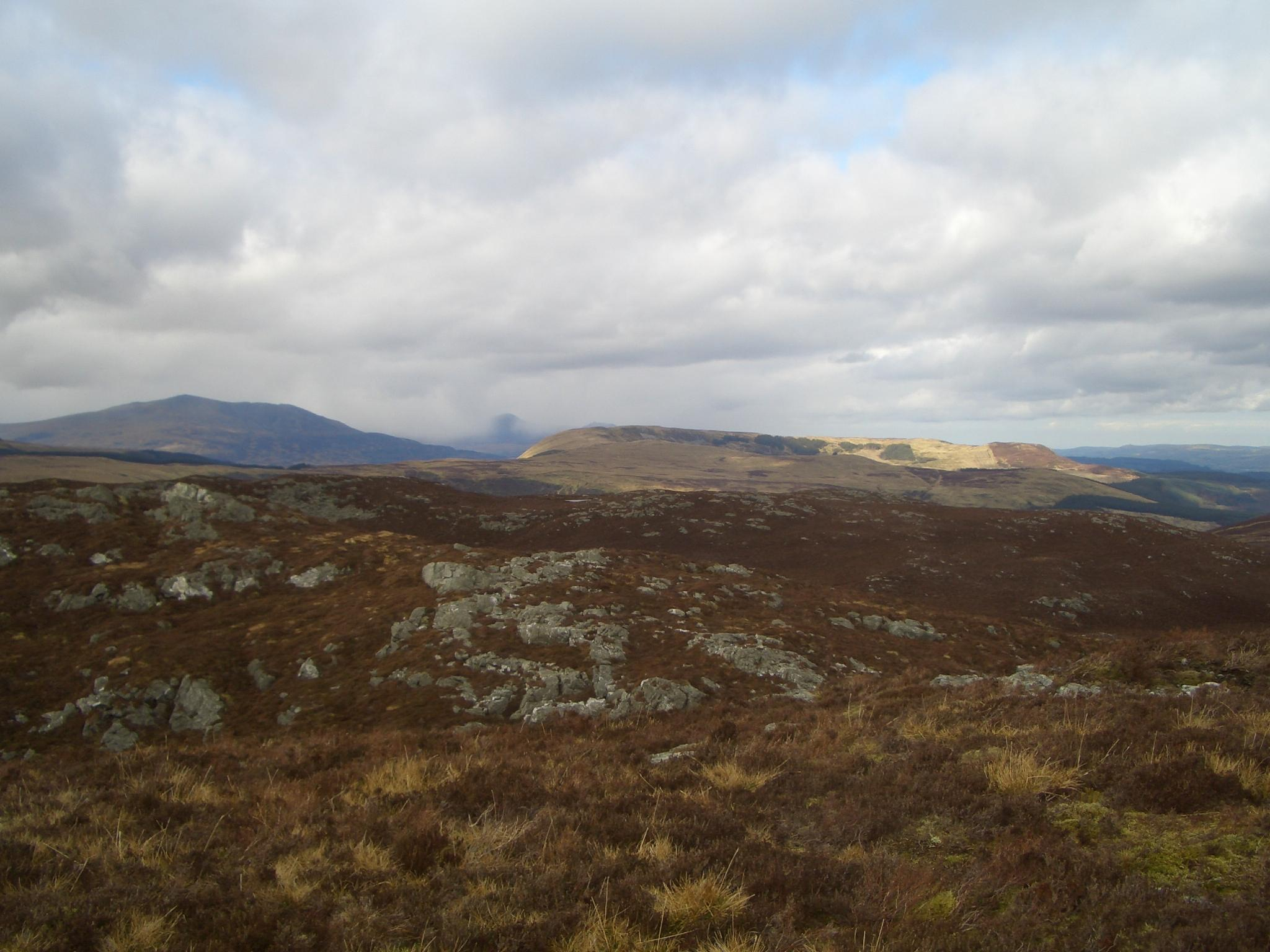
- Moel Siabod (left) and Y Ro Wen from Y Gamallt

Highest point
- Elevation: 599 m (1,965 ft)
- Prominence: 121 m (397 ft)
- Listing: Dewey, HuMP

Geography
- Location: Conwy, Wales
- Parent range: Moelwynion
- OS grid: SH716483
- Topo map: OS Landranger 115

Y Ro Wen is a mountain just north of Blaenau Ffestiniog, North Wales and forms part of the Moelwynion.

It may be climbed from Dolwyddelan or Cwm Penmachno. The popular climbing crag of Craig Alltrem can be found on its western slope. The summit has a shelter cairn, with views of Moel Penamnen, Manod Mawr North Top, Y Gamallt and Moel Siabod.
