= Arenig Fawr South Top =

Hill (836m) in Gwynedd, Wales

Coordinates: 52°54′53″N 3°44′46″W

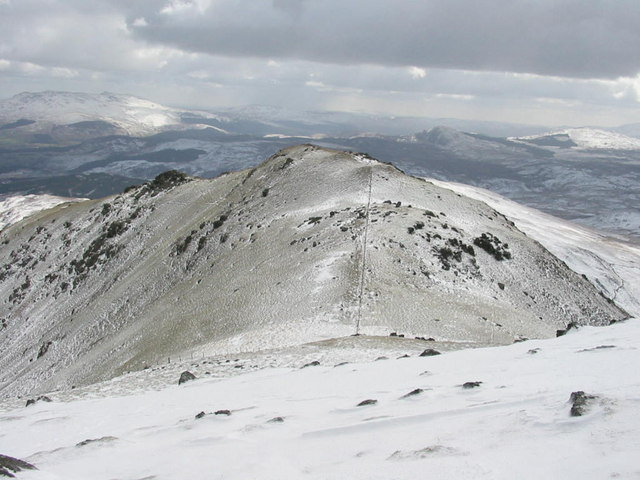
- Arenig Fawr South Top from the summit of Arenig Fawr

Highest point
- Elevation: 835 m (2,740 ft)
- Prominence: 21 m (69 ft)
- Parent peak: Arenig Fawr
- Listing: Nuttall

Naming
- English translation: Great High Ground
- Language of name: Welsh
- Pronunciation: Welsh: [aˈrɛnɪɡ ˈvaur]

Geography
- Location: Gwynedd, Wales
- Parent range: Snowdonia
- OS grid: SH 82676 36668
- Topo map: OS Landranger 124

Arenig Fawr South Top is the twin top of Arenig Fawr in southern Snowdonia, North Wales. It is the second highest member of the Arenig range, being 18 m less than its twin. From here the south ridge continues into an area of rocky knolls and small tarns, where Arenig Fawr South Ridge Top can be found.
