= Afon Llafar (Dee) =

River in Gwynedd, Wales

Coordinates: 52.874°N 3.648°W

Afon Llafar is a small river in North Wales which, rising on the eastern slopes of Arenig Fawr, flows south-east through the hamlet of Parc and into Llyn Tegid (Bala Lake). It is within the Dee catchment.
