= Car gwyllt =

Welsh mining invention

Coordinates: 52.991057°N 3.915171°W

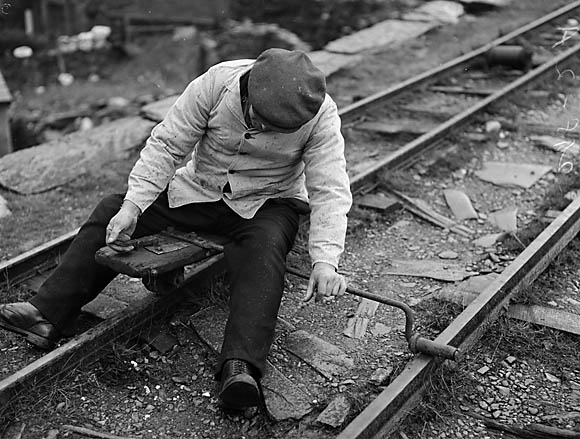
Riding a car gwyllt

The car gwyllt ("wild car"; plural: ceir gwyllt) is a Welsh invention used by quarrymen to ride downhill on the steep inclined planes of a slate quarry.

== History ==
Most Welsh slate quarries were steep excavations into the mountains of Snowdonia, North Wales. They were worked as a series of horizontal levels or lefals, served by small 2 ft (610 mm) gauge railways, hauled by men, horses or locomotives. These levels were linked by a series of inclined planes. The inclines were worked by gravity: slate was quarried from the upper levels and descended the inclines on small rail wagons under its own weight. Slate was worked on the middle levels of the quarry, sawn into slabs or split into roofing slates. Waste could be dumped from these levels to form large waste tips. Finished or part-finished slates were then lowered to the lowest level by a further incline and then taken to market by a narrow gauge railway.

Some larger quarries were worked by quarrymen who lived in barracks on site during the week, others lived in villages below the quarry and travelled each day. Part of this journey was to ascend the inclines each morning, usually hauled up in empty wagons. Descending after work was a long, although downhill, walk.

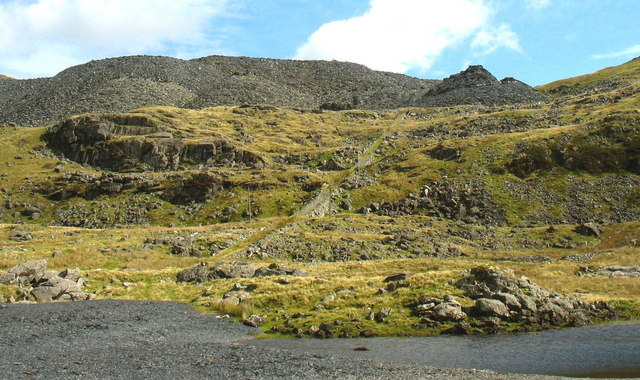
The second incline of the Graig Ddu Quarry

At Graig Ddu Quarry near Blaenau Ffestiniog, quarrymen living in Manod found a way to speed their homeward journey. Rather than walking back down the inclines, they would use their car gwyllt to ride down them.

Craig Ddu had four inclines, with many workers in the sawing and dressing sheds below the upper incline. (Note: Like the other mountain-top quarries in this area, a lack of water power at the top had displaced the working sheds down from the upper level) When the hooter of Oakeley Quarry sounded for the end of work at 4pm, there was a rush downhill to catch the bus from Bethania, along the valley to the other villages. The men could descend 1,000 feet, a distance of 1,800 yards including the walk between the two inclines, in around eight minutes.

50 miles an hour we went –

After arriving at the foot of the last incline, the cars would be dropped into an empty wagon which would be raised back up the inclines during the next working day.

A further, lower, incline passed down through Bethania to the GWR slate loading sidings, although this was not part of the quarrymen's route home.

Although quite widely known, the car gwyllt remained limited to the single quarry at Craig Ddu. This was due to the layout of the two main inclines: long enough to make the time-saving worthwhile, but also shallow enough to keep speed manageable and with a shallow run-out area at their foot.

This novel mode of transport became a matter of interest outside the quarries and in 1935 it formed part of Pathé News' newsreel film Railway Curiosities.

Craig Ddu continued in operation until the end of the 1930s and the outbreak of WWII. It re-opened briefly during the war, to supply roofing slates for the repair of blitzed housing.

== Construction ==
The car gwyllt was invented around 1870 by the quarry blacksmith, Edward Ellis. In later years they were made by Edward Jones, an independent smith living on Manod Road, who charged 5 shillings. Each quarryman had their own car and so an early purchase with a new starter's tal mawr (Note: 'Big pay', the monthly payment made to each team of quarrymen, and then shared between them.) would be a new car gwyllt.

The inclines were cable-hauled with two tracks running over four rails, so there were a series of cable rollers down the middle of each track. The cars avoided these by running between the two tracks, using just their inner rails. Rather than the near-universal two foot gauge of Welsh slate railways, this spacing was around three foot.

Their construction was a wooden plank, around two feet long. It rode on a single double-flanged wheel, with a V-shaped iron slipper on the rear of the plank. It was balanced by an iron outrigger to one side, with a pipe-shaped roller over its end. This wide roller also allowed for slight variations in gauge. To control the car there was a hand brake. Pulling upwards on this applied an iron brake to the tread of the wheel. Despite the simplicity of the idea, the cars were not unsophisticated in their manufacture. Most was made by the smith, but the cast wheel was made by a foundry in Porthmadog. The brake linkage comprised several pieces, each hand-forged. The brake handle was detachable and fitted over the main lever. It was decoratively forged with a lightweight curve. When not in use it was carried in the quarryman's pocket, a primitive form of anti-theft measure. This could have tragic consequences; one of the few fatal accidents was to children in the 1920s who crashed into a slate wagon through not having the brake handle. For reasons of safety, later operation of the cars became more organised, a responsible mine foreman leading the descent as 'captain', and setting a maximum speed. At times cavalcades of up to two hundred cars would descend in close procession.

== Other uses of "car gwyllt" ==
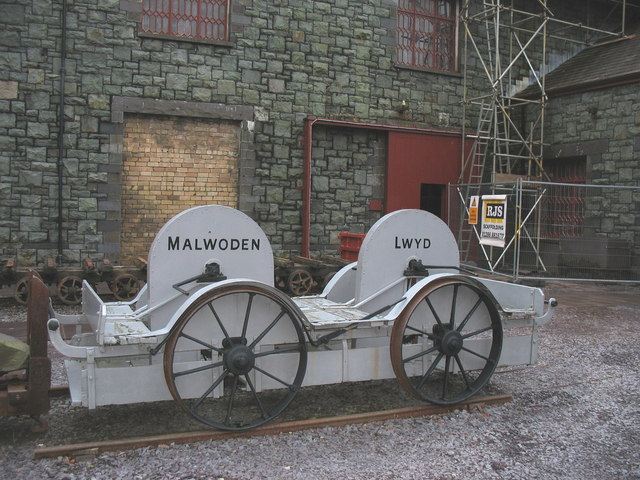
Malwoden Lwyd or 'grey snail', a Padarn Railway hand car

The name "car gwyllt" has been applied to a small number of other Welsh rail vehicles. On the Padarn Railway, both the hand-cranked and foot cranked "Velocipede" cars used the name. On the Hendre-Ddu Tramway "car gwyllt" referred to small gravity carriages used by quarrymen.

On the Mount Washington Cog Railway, built from 1866, the construction workers made use of a sliding wooden device, the "Devil's shingle". The rack railway has a ruling grade of 25% and speeds of 100 kilometres per hour (62 mph) had been reached before a fatal accident in 1906 led to the slideboards being banned.
