= Bwlch y Slaters quarry =

Slate quarry in north Wales

Graig Ddu
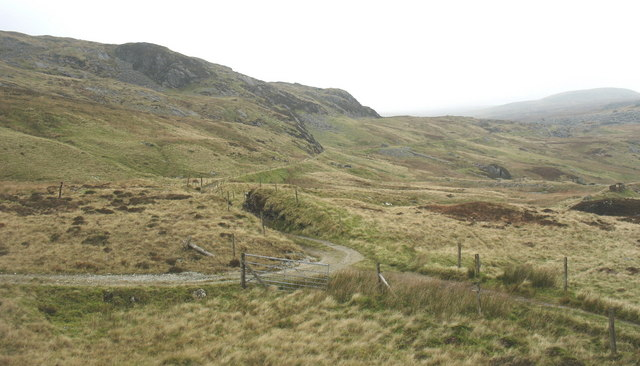
- The junction of the Bwlch-y-Slaters tramway with the Rhiwbach tramway

- Location in Gwynedd

Location
- Location: near Blaenau Ffestiniog, Gwynedd, Wales; 52.9920°N 3.8911°W

Production
- Products: Slate
- Type: Quarry

Bwlch y Slaters quarry (also known as Manod quarry, New Manod quarry, or, since the closure of the nearby Cwt y Bugail quarry, Cwt y Bugail quarry) is a slate quarry near Blaenau Ffestiniog (formerly Blaenau Festiniog), in Gwynedd (formerly Merioneth or Merionethshire), North Wales.

== History ==
Bwlch y Slaters quarry was a small affair, which started as open workings near the summit of Manod Mawr in the 1780s. Its early history is a little sketchy, but John Pritchard took a lease on the quarry for seven years in May 1824. Two months later, three-quarters of the quarry were leased to James Smart. Two men called Hudson and Magnes re-opened the quarry in 1835, and subsequently it was worked for seven years by a company probably called the Manchester and Festiniog Slate Co. James Meyrick then worked it, but lost the lease when he failed to make the payments for the lease. His manager, Edward Jones, then worked it, before selling the lease to a Mr Williams of Benner Fawr. Williams spent some £10,000 developing the site. During this period, slates were exported by taking them down Cwm Teigl.

In 1863, the Ffestiniog Railway completed construction of the Rhiwbach Tramway, which rose through three inclines from Blaenau Ffestiniog and then followed a level course to the top of an incline down to the Rhiwbach quarry. This quarry was owned by the Festiniog Slate Co., and the tramway was financed by them, with quarries who wanted to use it paying tolls to them. Significant development of the Bwlch y Slaters site began in 1866, when a connection from the quarry to the tramway was made, enabling finished slates to be exported to market much more easily. A steam-powered mill was constructed, and underground chambers were developed. The Bwlch y Slaters branch left the main tramway by a trailing siding and a shunting neck, before heading in a broadly south-westerly direction to reach the quarry. This arrangement required wagons to be reversed twice before they could be taken to Blaenau Ffestiniog.

Output from the quarry was quite variable, with periods when it closed and then reopened. In 1873 it was recorded as being productive again, presumably after a period when it was not, and in 1882 there were just two workers, but no output was recorded. Two years later, forty workers produced 1,058 tons of slates. There was another period of closure in the 1890s, with the quarry reopening in 1896. Production fell below 100 tons per year on occasions, but a second site was opened in 1903 at a higher level, linked to the original site by an incline, enabling the quarry to export 2,000 tons of slates in some years. By 1913 there were 49 workers, all of whom were laid off when working was suspended, but the quarry was working again by 1919. The quarry reverted to exporting slates via Cwm Teigl in the 1920s, after they failed to reach agreement over increased charges for using the tramway. The operating company was Manod Slate Quarries in 1937, who employed 66 men to extract and process the slate.

=== Second World War ===
During the Second World War, several of the chambers were used to store the contents of the National Gallery, to protect them from bomb damage. Following the retreat from Dunkirk and the fall of France and the Low Countries to Germany, plans were made by the government to protect the national art collection. Shipping the paintings to Canada was ruled out as too risky, because of the danger of attack by a U-boat, and although much of the collection had already been moved from London to Penrhyn Castle, Bangor University and the National Library of Wales at Aberystwyth, these locations were too susceptible to air attack. Additionally, the conditions under which the paintings were stored at these sites were not ideal. The National Gallery's scientific adviser Francis Rawlins surveyed the quarry in September 1940, and decided that five of the unused chambers could be isolated from the working quarry and used as storage space. The access road to the quarry was improved and explosives were used to enlarge the entrance, so that lorries could be unloaded inside the hillside. Brick bunkers were built internally, and a simple air conditioning system was used to counteract the damp conditions. Narrow gauge tracks were installed in the chambers, and several closed wagons were built by the London, Midland and Scottish Railway at their Derby works, which were hand-shunted along the tracks.

The project was quite secretive, and many of the smaller paintings arrived either in Cadbury delivery trucks or in Post Office vans, so that their contents were not obvious. Some very large pictures were packed into specially-made "elephant cases", and in the case of Anthony van Dyck's Equestrian Portrait of Charles I, it was too large to fit under a railway bridge on the approach to the storage site, requiring the road surface to be lowered to allow the vehicle to get through. By the summer of 1941, the entire collection was housed in the quarry.

Although it was thought that controlling the temperature and humidity were beneficial for the conservation of artworks, storage at Bwlch y Slaters provided an opportunity for a whole collection to be monitored, and it was found that many of the pictures were in better condition at the end of the war than they had been at the beginning. This led to changes in the way paintings were displayed and conserved once the collection returned to the National Gallery. Martin Davies, who was in charge of the pictures while they were in the quarry, also carried out research and was able to produce new editions of the National Gallery catalogues.

By the end of 1945, all of the collection had been returned to London, and although a small part of the quarry reopened, the Department of the Environment maintained control of the site in case it was required again, particularly during the Cold War. They only ceased to do so in the 1980s after a lengthy battle in the courts. In 1954 there were 35 men employed in the active part of the quarry, but they only produced 470 tons of finished slate. Six years later, quarrying operations ceased.

== Modern operations ==
Once the Department of the Environment relinquished control of the quarry, a new mill was built, occupying much the same location as the historic mill, but equipped with an automatic dressing machine, a profiler, and a line where flooring and cladding slabs are produced. The mill was completed in 1985. Modern quarrying operations at the site of the Bwlch y Slaters quarry began and quickly extended over the summit of Manod Mawr to reach the derelict Graig Ddu quarry. Much of the original quarry site has been obliterated by this untopping operation. The quarry was then owned by the Alfred McAlpine group, who invested in earth moving machinery and in modern sawing and dressing tables. During their tenure, Alfred McAlpine renamed the combined Bwlch y Slaters and Graig Ddu quarry as Cwt y Bugail, a name reused from the nearby Cwt y Bugail quarry some 2 miles (3.2 km) away. Untopping at the quarry ceased in September 2007, when Alfred McAlpine ran into financial difficulties.

Subsequently, operations restarted when the Breedon Group acquired the quarry, which it operated under the trade name Welsh Slate. It is thought to be the highest industrial site in Britain. The slates which the quarry produces are normally 50 by 25 centimetres (19.7 by 9.8 in) and modern machinery allows them to specify the thickness as 5.5, 7.5 or 9.5 mm. They conform to a British standard, and are normally expected to last longer than the building to which they are attached. The planning permission under which the quarry was reopened covered extraction up to 31 December 2022, and allows them to produce 15,000 tonnes of product each year. However, by the end of 2022, there will still be large reserves of rock at the site, and Welsh Slate have applied to Gwynedd Council to extend the operation until 2048. If permission is not granted, closure of the quarry would see the loss of 40 jobs.

== Bibliography ==
- Boyd, J I C (1975a). The Festiniog Railway; Vol. 1 - History and Route. Oakwood Press. ISBN 978-0-85361-167-7. OCLC 2074549.
- Boyd, J I C (1975b). The Festiniog Railway 1800 - 1974; Vol. 2 - Locomotives and Rolling Stock; Quarries and Branches: Rebirth 1954-74. Oakwood Press. ISBN 978-0-85361-168-4. OCLC 874117875.
- Hughes, Owen (4 March 2022). "Bid to extend life of Gwynedd slate quarry". Daily Post. Archived from the original on 24 March 2022.
- Lindsay, Jean (1974). A History of the North Wales Slate Industry. David and Charles. ISBN 978-0-7153-6265-5.
- Molyneux, Jess (16 January 2022). "33 photos of priceless artworks hidden inside Snowdonia quarry". Daily Post. Archived from the original on 17 January 2022.
- Patowary, Kaushik (22 August 2018). "The British Quarry That Hid Van Gogh, da Vinci and Rembrandt". Amusing Planet. Archived from the original on 9 November 2020.
- Prior, Neil (19 May 2019). "How National Gallery's art was hidden from Hitler in WW2". BBC News. Archived from the original on 22 May 2019.
- Richards, Alun John (1991). A Gazeteer of the Welsh Slate Industry. Gwasg Carreg Gwalch. ISBN 978-0-86381-196-8.
- Richards, Alun John (1999). The Slate Regions of North and Mid Wales. Gwasg Carreg Gwalch. ISBN 978-0-86381-552-2.
- Sallery, Dave (2008). "Manod / Welsh Slate's 'Cwt y Bugail Quarry': A brief history of the quarry". penmorfa.com. Archived from the original on 31 January 2019.
