= Moel y Gydros =

Hill in North Wales

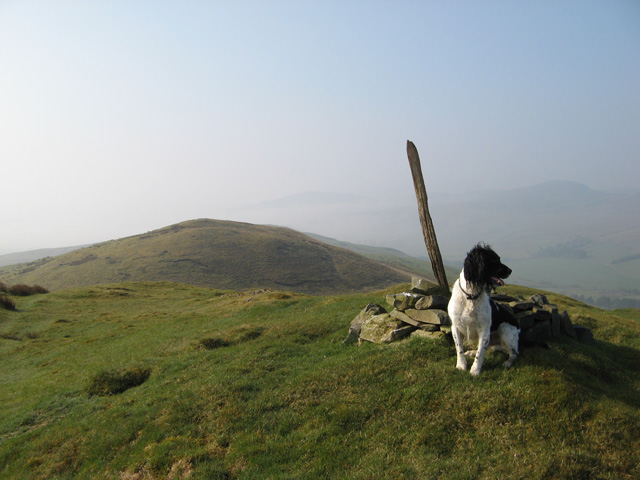

Highest point
- Elevation: 522.3 m (1,714 ft)
- Prominence: 145 m (476 ft)
- Parent peak: Carnedd y Filiast
- Listing: Dewey
- Coordinates: 52.994774°N 3.619045°W

Naming
- English translation: Bare Hill of Gydros
- Language of name: Welsh

Geography
- Location: Gwynedd, Wales
- Parent range: Arenigs
- OS grid: SH914453
- Topo map: OS Landranger 116 / "Explorer" OL18

Moel y Gydros (English: Bare Hill of Gydros) is a hill located just outside the Snowdonia National Park on the Gwynedd / Conwy border in North Wales. The B4501, Frongoch to Cerrigydrudion road skirts the hills lower slopes.

== Location ==
Moel y Gydros is a member of the Arenig range with Arenig Fawr lying approximately 8 miles (13 km) to the south west. Its parent peak, Carnedd y Filiast is 3 miles (4.8 km) to the west, and to the north west the Carneddau, Glyderau and Snowdon can be seen on a clear day, 20 miles (32 km) distant. The bleak moorland of Mynydd Hiraethog, and the Clwydian Range is to the north, with the Dee Valley, Corwen and the Berwyn range to the east / southeast. On highly exceptional days, Kinder Scout in the Peak District of Derbyshire can be seen, 78 miles (126 km) away, although such sightings would be rare.

== Ascent ==
The easy climb to the summit takes about 45 minutes steady walk. There is a farm vehicle access track that leads from the Cwmpenanner road to the summit where a small stone cairn can be found.
