= Carnedd Llechwedd-llyfn =

Hill (643m) in Gwynedd, Wales

Coordinates: 52°59′7″N 3°42′10″W

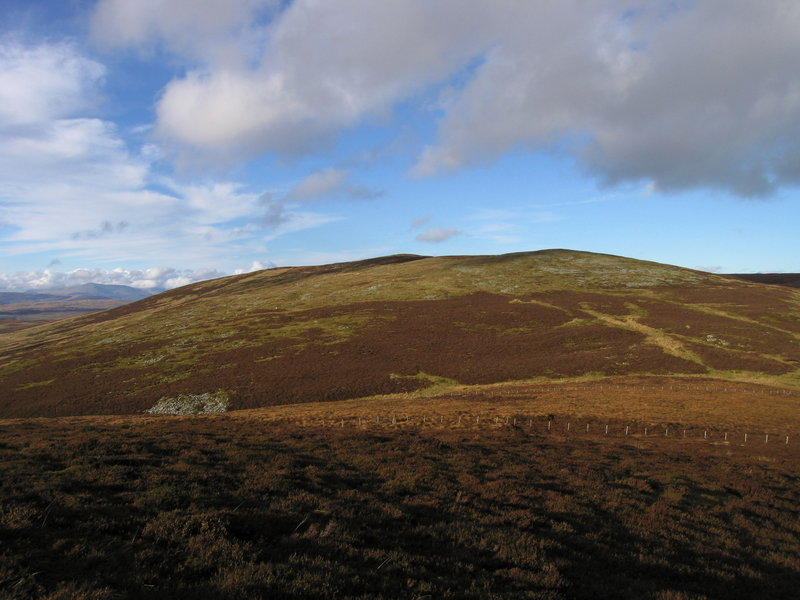
- Carnedd Llechwedd-llyfn from Foel Boeth

Highest point
- Elevation: 643 m (2,110 ft)
- Prominence: 25 m (82 ft)
- Parent peak: Carnedd y Filiast
- Listing: Sub Hewitt, Nuttall

Geography
- Location: Gwynedd, Wales
- Parent range: Snowdonia
- OS grid: SH 85786 44466
- Topo map: OS Landranger 115

Carnedd Llechwedd-llyfn is a subsidiary summit of Carnedd y Filiast on the border of Snowdonia National Park in Llandderfel, in Gwynedd. The northern slopes of the peak lie in Ysbyty Ifan, in Conwy. It is part of the Arenig mountain range, and rises from the shore of Llyn Celyn.

It is also a peak in an area of moorland known as the Migneint. The views of northern Snowdonia are extensive. Arenig Fach, Arenig Fawr and Waun Garnedd y Filiast can also be seen. The summit is marked by a small cairn next to a fence which runs across this boggy summit.
