= Llechwedd =

Llechwedd is Welsh for "hillside" or "slope" and may refer to:

- Llechwedd, Conwy, a village near Conwy, Wales.
- Llechwedd Du, a summit of Esgeiriau Gwynion, Wales.
- Llechwedd quarry, a slate quarry in Blaenau Ffestiniog, Wales.
- Llechwedd Slate Caverns, a visitor attraction in Llechwedd Quarry in Blaenau Ffestiniog, Wales.
- Carnedd Llechwedd-llyfn, a subsidiary summit of Carnedd y Filiast
