= Waun Garnedd-y-filiast =

Hill (650.9m) in Gwynedd, Wales

Coordinates: 52°59′33″N 3°40′44″W

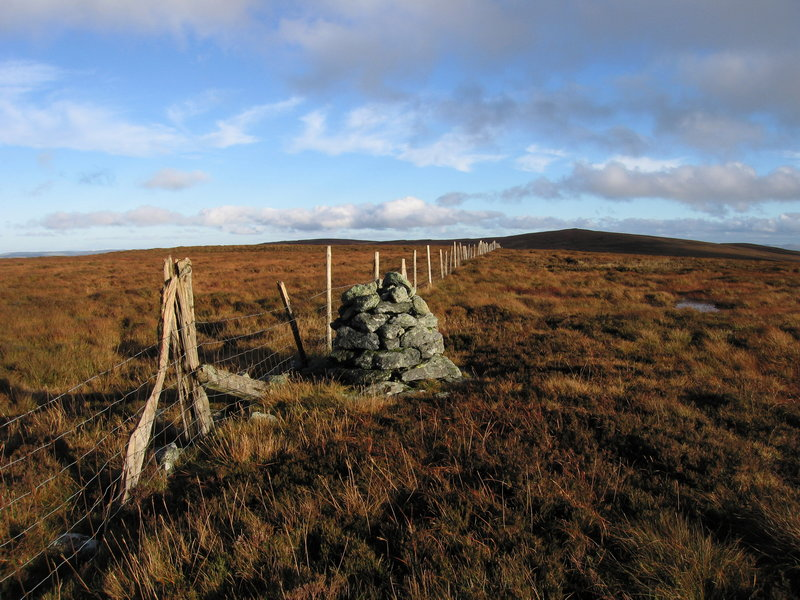
- Waun Garnedd-y-filiast (left) and Carnedd y Filiast (right) from the summit of Carnedd Llechwedd-llyfn

Highest point
- Elevation: 651 m (2,136 ft)
- Prominence: 15 m (49 ft)
- Parent peak: Carnedd y Filiast
- Listing: Nuttall

Geography
- Location: Gwynedd, Wales
- Parent range: Snowdonia
- OS grid: SH 87408 45238
- Topo map: OS Landranger 115

Waun Garnedd-y-filiast is a top of Carnedd y Filiast on the border of the Snowdonia National park near Cerrigydrudion in North Wales. It is part of the Arenig mountain range. It is also a peak in an area of moorland known as the Migneint.

The summit is marked by a few stones in an area of peat hags on a small plateau of bog. Foel Goch (Arenigs), Carnedd Llechwedd-llyfn and Mwdwl-eithin can be seen.

The top was not included in the Nuttall's original list. However, in 1999 it was surveyed to have the following re-ascent 15.1295 m (49 ft 7.5in). Controversy arose due to it not being quite 50 ft. Some walkers choose only to include it in a Metric list along with 600–608 m sub Hewitt summits. However, most walkers regard it as a full Nuttall by now since it rounds up to 50 ft.
