= Arenig Fawr South Ridge Top =

Hill (712m) in Gwynedd, Wales

Coordinates: 52°54′29″N 3°44′42″W

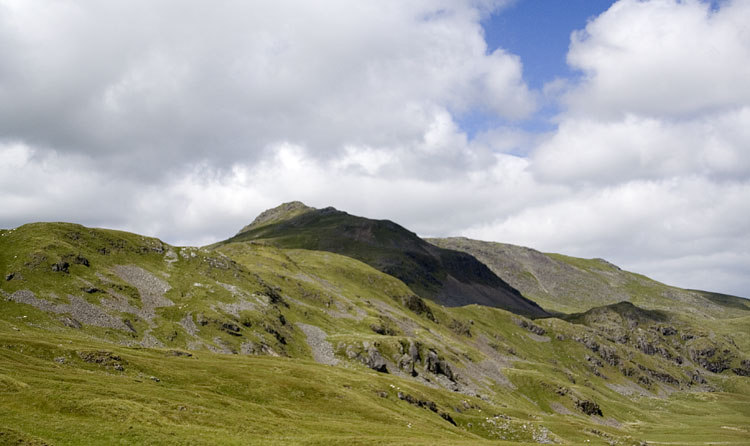
- Arenig Fawr South Ridge Top from the south

Highest point
- Elevation: 712 m (2,336 ft)
- Prominence: 18 m (59 ft)
- Parent peak: Arenig Fawr
- Listing: Nuttall

Naming
- English translation: Great High Ground
- Language of name: Welsh
- Pronunciation: Welsh: [aˈrɛnɪɡ ˈvaur]

Geography
- Location: Gwynedd, Wales
- Parent range: Snowdonia
- OS grid: SH 82741 35941
- Topo map: OS Landranger 124

Arenig Fawr South Ridge Top is a top of Arenig Fawr in southern Snowdonia, North Wales. It lies in area of rocky knolls and small tarns, found on the broad south ridge of Arenig Fawr.

The summit, marked by a few stones, is a top of the highest rocky outcrop found in the area. The views are limited, blocked by the bulk of Arenig Fawr. A path leads down the west flank of the ridge towards Moel Llyfnant.
