= Foel Goch (Arenigs) =

Mountain in north-west Wales

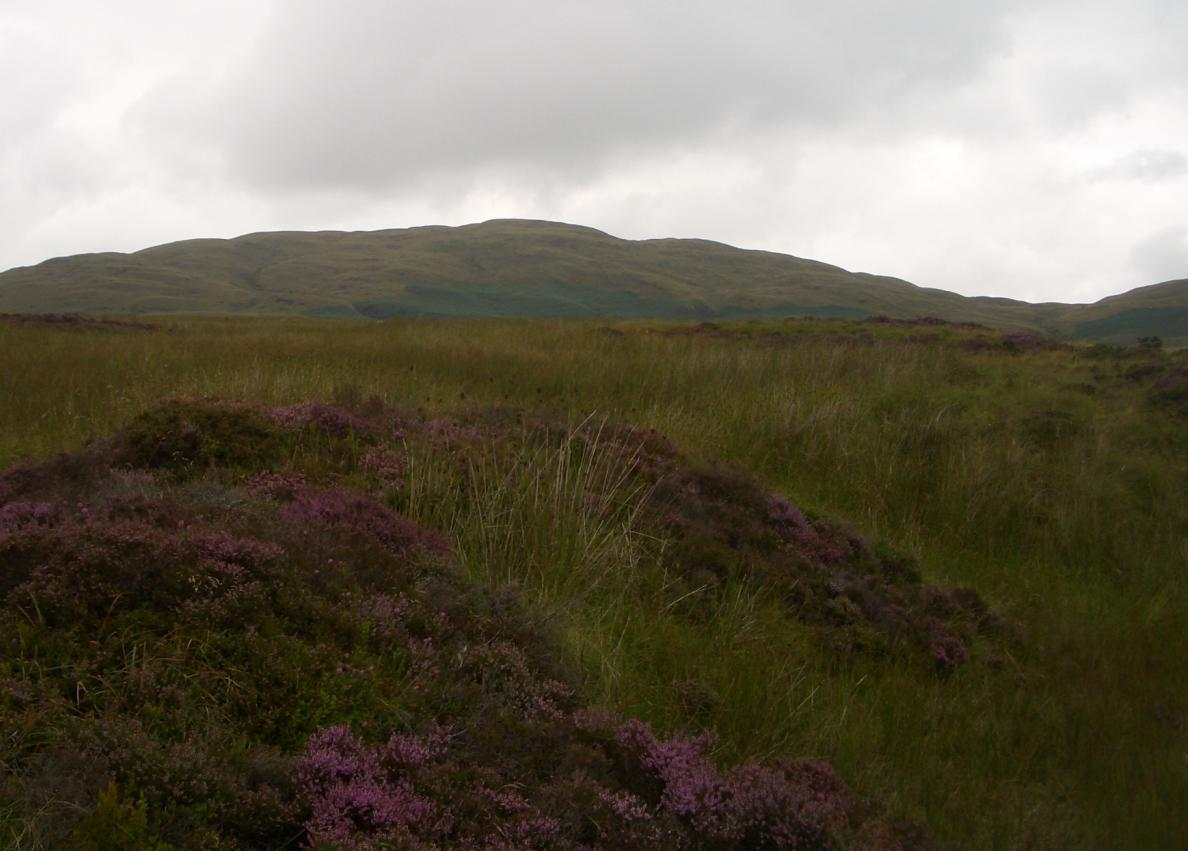
- Foel Goch from Cwm Da

Highest point
- Elevation: 611 m (2,005 ft)
- Prominence: 274 m (899 ft)
- Parent peak: Arenig Fawr
- Listing: Marilyn, Hewitt, Nuttall

Geography
- Location: Gwynedd, Wales
- Parent range: Snowdonia

Foel Goch is a mountain in north-west Wales, and forms part of the Arenig mountain range. It is the only member of the Arenig group that lies outside of the Snowdonia National Park.

The summit is grassy and is marked by a trig point, cairn and a boundary stone. Glacial erratics litter its slopes, with a large one located in Cwm Da. To the west are Carnedd y Filiast and Arenig Fach, while to the south west are Arenig Fawr and Mynydd Nodol. To the south is Aran Fawddwy and to the south east are Cadair Berwyn and Cyrniau Nod.
