= Moel Oernant =

Hill (503m) in Gwynedd

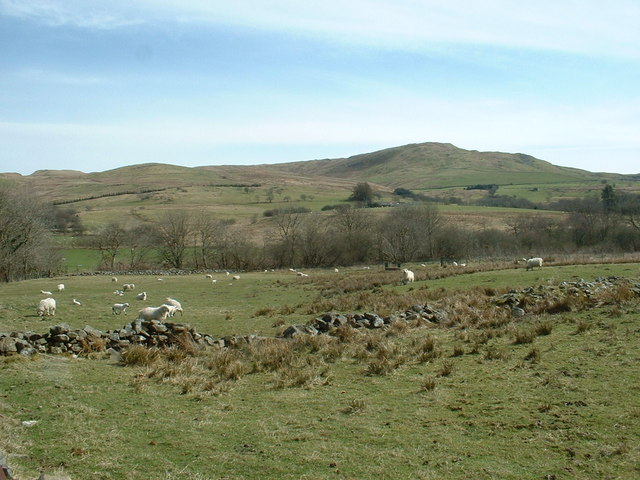
- Farmland and Moel Oernant

Highest point
- Elevation: 503 m (1,650 ft)
- Prominence: 141 m (463 ft)
- Parent peak: Moel Llyfnant
- Coordinates: 52°53′20″N 3°52′15″W

Naming
- English translation: bare hill of the cold stream
- Language of name: Welsh

Geography
- Location within Wales
- Location: Gwynedd, Wales
- OS grid: SH 742340
- Topo map: OS Landranger 124 / Explorer OL18

Moel Oernant is a 503-metre (1,650 ft) high hill in the community of Trawsfynydd in the county of Gwynedd in North Wales. It has a number of western tops, the highest of which reaches a height of 466 metres (1,529 ft) overlooking the waterbody known as Llyn Gelli-Gain and another at Frîdd Wen exceeds 410 metres (1,350 ft). To the south of the lake is the top of Pîg Idris which reaches 429m. The minor top of Y-Foel attains 430m to the northeast of Moel Oernant.

== Geology ==
The hill is formed largely from the mudstones, siltstone and sandstones of the Maentwrog Formation and the siltstones of the underlying Clogau Formation, component units of the Mawddach Group of Cambrian age sedimentary rocks. Sandstones and siltstones of the Gamlan Formation of the Harlech Group are also present. An igneous intrusion of microtonalite lies to the west of the summit and the whole hill is cross-cut by dykes of similar material and later dolerite. Some quartz vein mineralization is recorded within the microtonalite outcrop. A number of faults criss-cross the area, the most significant of which is the broadly north–south aligned Craiglaseithin Fault which runs through the summit of the 466m top. The lower slopes are mantled with a patchy cover of glacial till.

== Access ==
A public bridleway continuing as a public footpath runs from Cwm Prysor southwest across the northern and western flanks of the hill towards Trawsfynydd. Other than parts of its northern slopes the entire hill is mapped as open country under the Countryside and Rights of Way Act 2000 and therefore freely available for public access on foot. Along its southern and eastern margin is a minor public road beside the Afon Gain.
