= Moel Penamnen =

Mountain in Gwynedd, Wales

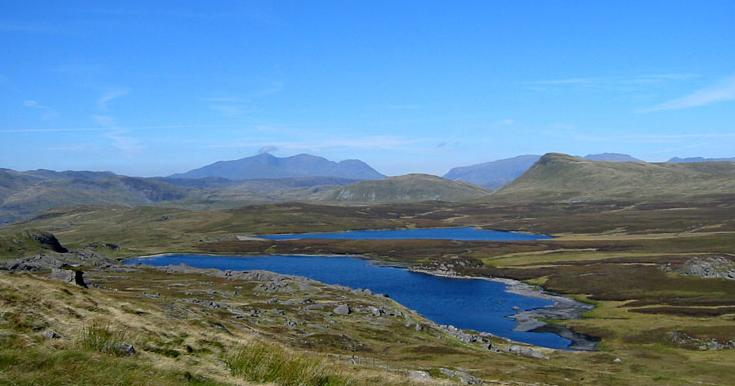
- Moel Penamnen from Manod Mawr

Highest point
- Elevation: 628 m (2,060 ft)
- Prominence: 138 m (453 ft)
- Parent peak: Manod Mawr
- Listing: Hewitt, Nuttall, HuMP
- Coordinates: 53°01′00″N 3°54′56″W

Geography
- Location within Wales
- Location: Gwynedd, Wales
- Parent range: Moelwynion
- OS grid: SH716483
- Topo map: OS Landranger 115

Moel Penamnen is a mountain just north of Blaenau Ffestiniog, North Wales and forms part of the Moelwynion.

It may be climbed from the Crimea Pass via Moel Barlwyd, from Blaenau Ffestiniog or Cwm Penamnen to the north. A circular of Cwm Penamnen can be done taking in Y Ro Wen. It may also be combined with its parent peak Manod Mawr, however the pass between these peaks is extremely boggy and there are many mines, air shafts and open quarries in the area.
