= Carnedd y Filiast (Cerrigydrudion) =

Mountain in Gwynedd, Wales

Coordinates: 52°59′12″N 3°40′59″W

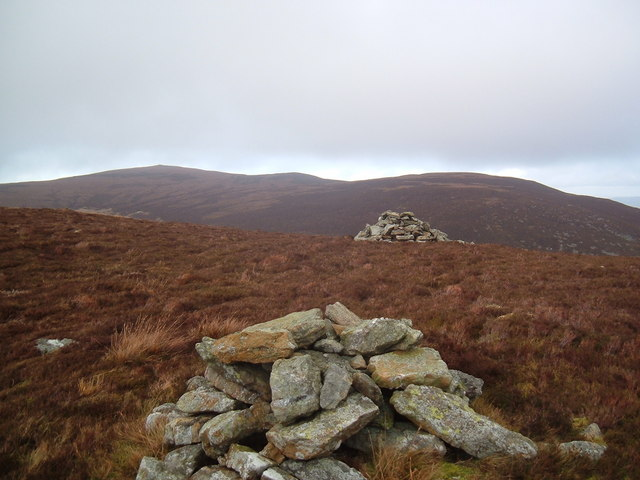
- Carnedd y Filiast from Foel Boeth

Highest point
- Elevation: 669 m (2,195 ft)
- Prominence: 316 m (1,037 ft)
- Parent peak: Arenig Fawr
- Listing: Marilyn, Hewitt, Nuttall

Geography
- Location within Gwynedd
- Location: Gwynedd / Conwy, Wales
- Parent range: Snowdonia
- OS grid: SH 87115 44595
- Topo map: OS Landranger 115

Listed summits of Carnedd y Filiast (Cerrigydrudion)
Name	Grid ref	Height	Status
Waun Garnedd y Filiast	SH874442	650 m (2,130 ft)	Nuttall
Carnedd Llechwedd-llyfn	SH857444	643 m (2,110 ft)	Hewitt, Nuttall

Carnedd y Filiast is a mountain near Cerrigydrudion on the border of the Snowdonia National Park, North Wales and is 669 metres (2,195 ft) high.

== Location ==
Carnedd y Filiast is part of the Arenig mountain range, and rises from the shore of Llyn Celyn. It is also a peak in an area of moorland known as the Migneint. The Conwy/Gwynedd boundary passes through the summit. To the east is a small lake - Llyn Hesgyn.

== Summit View ==
From the summit, with good weather conditions, it is possible to see several notable mountains and mountain ranges: Arenig Fach and the Rhinogs in the west, with the Llŷn Peninsula and Bardsey Island in the far distance. Snowdon, Moel Siabod, the Great Orme and the Carneddau to the northwest, the Clwydian Range and Moel Famau to the northeast, east to the Berwyns, south west to Aran Fawddwy, and southward to Llyn Tegid (Bala Lake), Rhobell Fawr and Arenig Fawr. In exceptional conditions the Isle of Man, the Blackpool Tower, summits of the Lake District, the Winter Hill Transmitter, and the Peak District can also be seen. The furthest peaks visible in perfect conditions are Cross Fell and Great Dun Fell in the far east of Cumbria, Helvellyn in the Lake District, Snaefell on the Isle of Man and Pen y Ghent and Great Whernside in North Yorkshire.

The mountain has a north facing glacial cwm known as Y Gylchedd.
