= Manod Mawr North Top =

Mountain (658m) in Gwynedd, Wales

Coordinates: 52.98348°N 3.90360°W

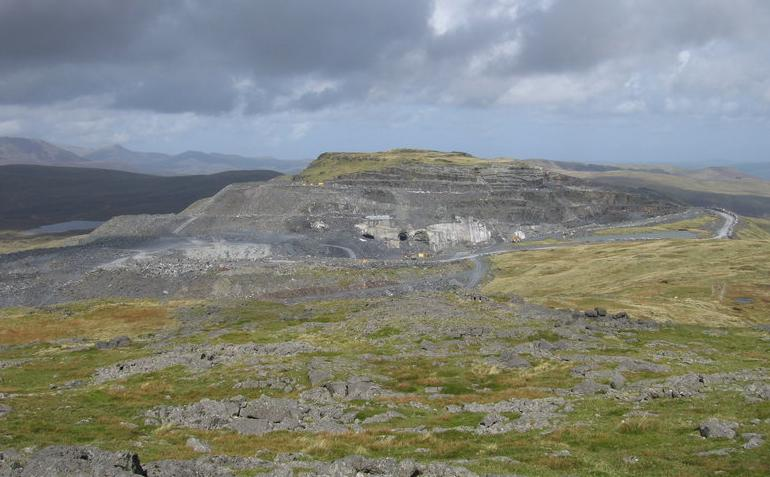
- Manod Mawr North Top from Manod Mawr

Highest point
- Elevation: 658 m (2,159 ft)
- Prominence: 65 m (213 ft)
- Listing: Hewitt, Nuttall

Naming
- English translation: great snowdrift
- Language of name: Welsh
- Pronunciation: Welsh: [ˈmanɔd ˈmauɾ]

Geography
- Location: Gwynedd, Wales
- Parent range: Moelwynion
- Topo map: OS Landranger 124

Manod Mawr North Top is a mountain in North Wales and forms part of the Moelwynion.

It lies directly to the north of its parent Manod Mawr, separated by the Graig Ddu Quarry. Crossing the quarry to reach the main summit can be dangerous. There are also a few mine adits on the northern slopes. There were fears that the top may eventually be removed.
