= Graig Ddu quarry =

Disused slate quarry in north Wales

Graig Ddu
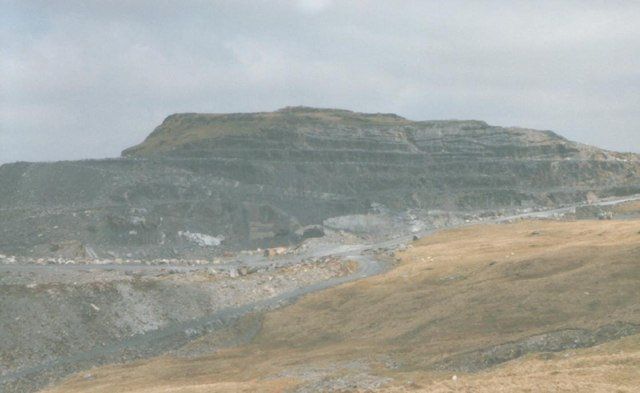
- Graig Ddu quarry in 2004

- Location in Gwynedd
- Location: near Blaenau Ffestiniog, Gwynedd, Wales; 52.992259°N 3.899746°W (quarry) 52.991057°N 3.915171°W (slate works)
- Products: Slate
- Type: Quarry

Graig Ddu quarry (also known as Craig Ddu quarry, Manod quarry, or, since the closure of the nearby Cwt y Bugail quarry, Cwt y Bugail quarry) is a disused slate quarry near Blaenau Ffestiniog (formerly Blaenau Festiniog), in Gwynedd (formerly Merioneth or Merionethshire), North Wales. Although output was only about 3,000 tons a year (3,140 tons in 1882), it reputedly has 36 saw tables and the same number of dressing machines on site. As with others in the area, the quarry suffered from a lack of water, resulting in the siting of the mill some distance away, at a lower level.

Slate was initially taken to a wharf on the River Dwyryd for onward transport, but in the 1860s, three inclines were built to link the quarry to the road at Tan y Manod. In 1869, this was extended by a fourth incline to connect to the Festiniog and Blaenau Railway. In 1883, the railway was replaced by a standard gauge extension of the Great Western Railway, and quarry wagons were carried piggy-back style to Blaenau Ffestiniog. The quarry was one of the first in the Blaenau Ffestiniog area to use compressed air drills for extracting the rock, and unlike most quarries in the area, all working remained on the surface until the 1920s, when underground mining began.

The quarry was known for the use of ceir gwyllt (wild cars), simple devices that allowed the quarrymen to ride down the inclines to the Tan y Manod road at the end of the day. This was possible because of the relatively shallow pitch of the inclines, but it was still a dangerous practice, and a number of workers died as a result of accidents on them.

The quarry closed in 1939, although it operated briefly at the end of the Second World War. From the 1980s, untopping of the neighbouring Bwlch y Slaters quarry began, and the operation soon engulfed Graig Ddu quarry. Currently, planning permission to extract rock ends on 31 December 2022, but Welsh Slate, the operating company, have applied for permission to continue working the site until 2048.

== History ==
The quarry originally opened as Manod quarry in about 1800. Although it was located at around 1,800 feet (550 m) above ordnance datum, there is no record that shelters for the men were ever constructed. From the quarry, a track passed around Mynydd Manod and led down to the River Dwyryd at Maentwrog, enabling slates to be exported to market by boat. It is often referred to as Old Manod, to distinguish it from the nearby Bwlch y Slaters quarry, which was also known as Manod, and is referred to as New Manod. In the 1840s, the Manod quarry moved northwards, and the new site was developed as Graig Ddu. Unlike all of the other quarries near Blaenau Ffestiniog, it was not worked underground, and this continued to be the case until the 1920s. Three mills were built close to the workings, in which there were around 20 saws, 20 dressing machines and five planers. Power for these was provided by a water wheel, assisted when necessary by a 15 hp (11 kW) steam engine.

A new company, the New Craig Ddu Slate Company Ltd was formed in 1864/5 to work the quarry. Around 1865, a three-pitch cable-worked incline was built down to the main road at Tan y Manod. The lease to authorise the construction, which ended next to the Glangors Inn at the lower end, was signed on 31 December 1865. After the Festiniog and Blaenau Railway opened in 1868, a fourth incline was constructed from the road down to the new railway. The upper three inclines were much shallower than most of the inclines in the area, with an average gradient of 1 in 6, whereas the final incline was considerably steeper. The connection to the Ffestiniog and Blaenau Railway appears to have been made in late 1869, as around 300 yards (270 m) of the fourth incline remained to be completed in July 1869. Three new mills were constructed at the bottom of the upper incline, equipped with 12 saws and 11 dressers. To make the most of a limited water supply, they were powered by another waterwheel, which was underground, and was fed by an underground leat lined with iron. Most of the water was pumped from Llyn y Manod by another waterwheel, while some was obtained from ponds to the north of the quarry. A 16 hp (12 kW) steam engine provided the power when the water supply was inadequate. 106 men were employed at the quarry in 1873.

Tan-y-Manod railway station on the Festiniog and Blaenau Railway was situated on a sharp curve, with the station building to the east of the curve. There was a long passing loop, which was connected to two sidings to the south of the building, and the southernmost siding was connected to the fourth incline. At the top of the incline was a wagon turntable, enabling the line to run eastwards before it crossed the main road the join the third incline by a reversing neck. Prior to the level crossing, there was another siding which ran to the west, passing under the incline. The loop at the station appears to have been used to store slate wagons, rather than to allow trains to pass one another. The third and second inclines were 1,326 yards (1,212 m) long, with a very short connecting track between them, and at the upper end was the Graig Ddu slate works. The third incline ran between the lower works and the quarry itself.

The first three inclines were renowned for the quarrymen's use of ceir gwyllt (wild cars), a device akin to a skateboard which sat on one rail, with a double flanged wheel at the front and a V-shaped notch at the back. An arm with a roller on the end of it reached across to the parallel rail, and there was a brake which pressed on the wheel. The device was invented by the company blacksmith in the 1870s, and could reach alarming speeds. In an attempt to reduce accidents, a captain was the first to descend, with the others following, and it was his job to ensure that progress was steady and orderly, although this did not always stop abuses of the system. Fatal accidents were reported in 1897 and 1898, due to riders losing control of their cars, and crashing into the rider in front of them. In the 1920s two children died after they sneaked into the works in the evening, took a wild car and crashed into a slate wagon. These devices were only used at Graig ddu because the exit incline from the mill level was both very long and of a relatively shallow pitch, running across the face of the hillside to the east of Tanymanod, rather than directly up and down.

Working conditions were tough, and there were frequent accidents within the quarries. Mrs Oakeley had opened a hospital at Llwyn-y-gell in 1848, for the benefit of quarrymen and their families in the Ffestiniog district. In theory, quarry proprietors made a subscription to the hospital, the size of which was based upon the number of workers they employed. However, some did not bother, and the Oakeley surgeon cited the case of a man from Graig Ddu whose hand had been crushed and required amputating. On arrival at the hospital, he had not been admitted, because the quarry agent would not guarantee that the costs of the operation would be met, although he was later treated elsewhere by the surgeon.

Another company, the Craigddu Slate Company, was formed in 1880. In 1876, the Festiniog and Blaenau Railway had come to an arrangement with the fledgling Bala and Festiniog Railway Company, under which the new company bought the narrow gauge railway and converted it to standard gauge. By the time the conversion took place, the new railway was effectively a branch of the Great Western Railway (GWR). The completed line opened on 10 September 1883, but there was no passenger station at Tan-y-Manod. However, there were extended goods facilities, with the GWR building narrow gauge slate wagons, which were worked up the quarries, while on the standard gauge line, wagons were carried to Blaenau Ffestiniog, where they could be transferred to the Ffestiniog Railway or their contents transferred into GWR wagons for onward shipment, using a piggy-back style similar to that used on the Padarn Railway at Dinorwic quarry. The former Tan-y-Manod station gained a locomotive shed and a turntable, as well as an interchange point where narrow gauge wagons were loaded onto or unloaded from standard gauge wagons. In 1882, the quarry employed 110 men, and produced over 3,000 tons of slate. Output fluctuated considerably from year to year, but at the turn of the century, some 6,000 tons were produced.

Graig Ddu was one of the early sites to use compressed air drills and winches, derived from steam-powered compressors. Air drills were in use by 1902 at this site, as well as at Oakeley quarry and Rhiwbach quarry. During the First World War, the quarry closed in 1917, after slate quarrying was declared to be a non-essential occupation by the government of the day. Workings at the quarry remained on the surface until the 1920s, when underground working began. In 1925 a gas engine was installed to provide a more reliable source of power for the mills, and at some point a hydro-electric plant was built part way down the second incline. The quarry remained in operation until 1939, at which point 86 men were employed. While a small number of the quarrymen lived in barracks at the top of the site during the week, most did not, and the use of wild cars to descend from the quarry at the end of the day continued until 1939.

=== Closure ===
Graig Ddu closed in 1939 at the outbreak of the Second World War. It re-opened briefly after the war to supply slates for rebuilding bomb-damaged cities, but closed again in 1946.

== Modern operations ==
From the mid-1980s, modern quarrying operations at the site of the Bwlch y Slaters or New Manod quarry extended over the summit of Manod Mawr and reached the derelict Graig Ddu quarry. Much of the quarry site has been obliterated by this untopping operation. The quarry was then owned by the Alfred MacAlpine group, who invested in earth moving machinery and in modern sawing and dressing tables. During their tenure, MacAlpines renamed the combined Bwlch y Slaters and Graig Ddu quarry as Cwt y Bugail, a name reused from a nearby quarry some 2 miles (3.2 km) away. Untopping at Graig Ddu ceased in September 2007, when MacAlpines ran into financial difficulties.

Subsequently, operations restarted when the Breedon Group acquired the quarry, which is operated under the trade name Welsh Slate. It is thought to be the highest industrial site in Britain. The slates which the quarry produces are normally 50 by 25 centimetres (19.7 by 9.8 in) and modern machinery allows them to specify the thickness as 5.5, 7.5 or 9.5 mm. They conform to a British standard, and are normally expected to last longer than the building to which they are attached. The planning permission under which the quarry was reopened covered extraction up to 31 December 2022, and allows them to produce 15,000 tonnes of product each year. However, by the end of 2022, there will still be large reserves of rock at the site, and Welsh Slate have applied to Gwynedd Council to extend the operation until 2048. If permission is not granted, closure of the quarry would see the loss of 40 jobs.

== Description ==
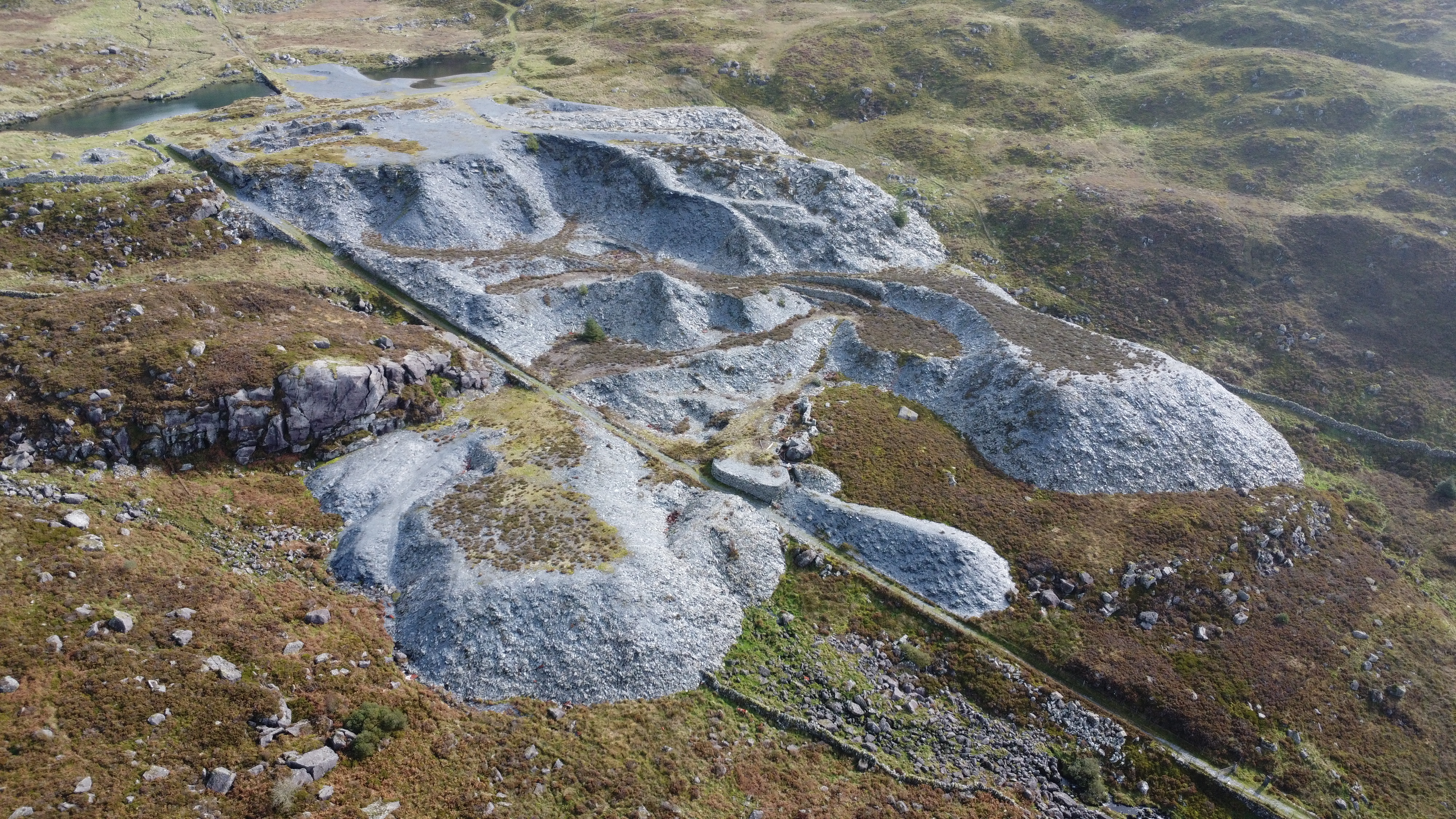
Craig Ddu mill level

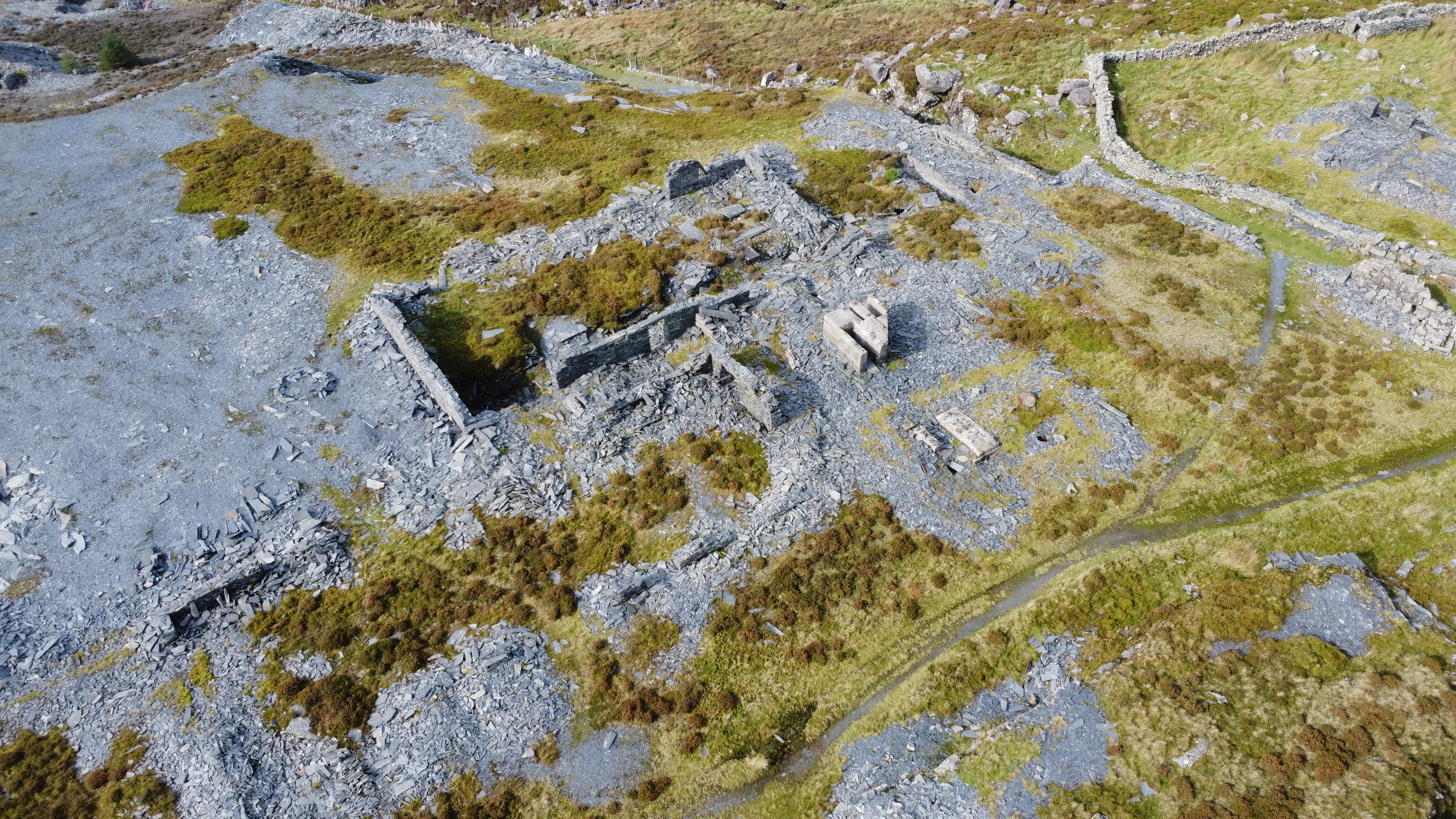
Abandoned mill buildings, Craig Ddu

== Gallery ==
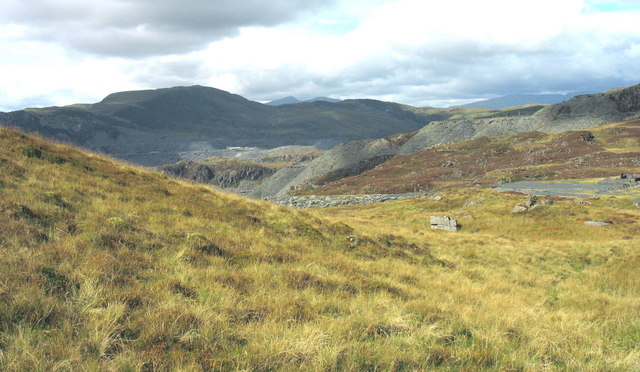
The derelict slate storage area at Graig Ddu quarry

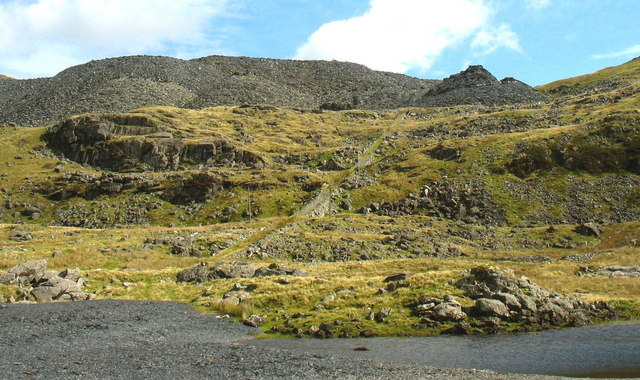
The upper incline at Graig Ddu

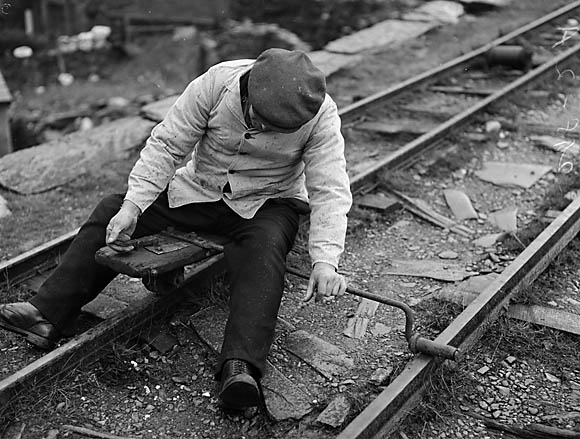
Riding the "car gwyllt" in the Craig-ddu Quarry (1959)

== Bibliography ==
- Boyd, J I C (1972). Narrow Gauge Railways in South Caernarvonshire. Oakwood Press. ISBN 978-0-85361-115-8.
- Boyd, J I C (1975). The Festiniog Railway 1800 - 1974; Vol. 2 - Locomotives and Rolling Stock; Quarries and Branches: Rebirth 1954-74. Oakwood Press. ISBN 978-0-85361-168-4. OCLC 874117875.
- Gwyn, David (2015). Welsh Slate. Royal Commission on the Ancient and Historical Monuments of Wales. ISBN 978-1-871184-51-8.
- Hughes, Owen (4 March 2022). "Bid to extend life of Gwynedd slate quarry". Daily Post. Archived from the original on 24 March 2022.
- Jenkins, Huw (11 April 2008). "Wild way home" (PDF). BBC Wales.
- Lindsay, Jean (1974). A History of the North Wales Slate Industry. David and Charles. ISBN 978-0-7153-6265-5.
- Richards, Alun John (1991). A Gazeteer of the Welsh Slate Industry. Gwasg Carreg Gwalch. ISBN 978-0-86381-196-8.
- Richards, Alun John (1999). The Slate Regions of North and Mid Wales. Gwasg Carreg Gwalch. ISBN 978-0-86381-552-2.
- Sallery, Dave (2008). "Manod / Welsh Slate's 'Cwt y Bugail Quarry': A brief history of the quarry". penmorfa.com. Archived from the original on 31 January 2019.
