= Manod Mawr =

Mountain (661m) in Gwynedd, Wales

Coordinates: 52.98348°N 3.90360°W

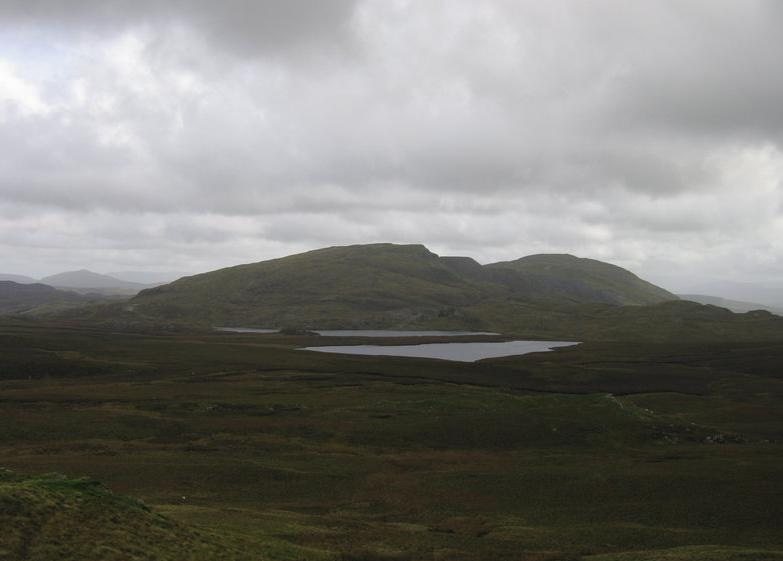
- Manod Mawr North Top and Manod Mawr from Moel Penamnen

Highest point
- Elevation: 661 m (2,169 ft)
- Prominence: 266 m (873 ft)
- Parent peak: Arenig Fach
- Listing: Marilyn, Hewitt, Nuttall

Naming
- English translation: great snowdrift
- Language of name: Welsh
- Pronunciation: Welsh: [ˈmanɔd ˈmaur]

Geography
- Location: Gwynedd, Wales
- Parent range: Moelwynion
- OS grid: SH723446
- Topo map: OS Landranger 124

Listed summits of Manod Mawr
Name	Grid ref	Height	Status
Manod Mawr North Top		658 m (2,159 ft)	Hewitt, Nuttall
Moel Penamnen		623 m (2,044 ft)	Hewitt, Nuttall
Manod Bach		511 m (1,677 ft)	Dodd (hill), Dewey (hill)

Manod Mawr is a mountain in North Wales and forms part of the Moelwynion. Although known as a mountain in the eastern Moelwyns, it and its sister peaks are sometimes known as the Ffestiniog hills.

Manod Mawr is a mountain which has been extensively quarried. The now-closed Graig Ddu Quarry is to be found on the 600-metre (2,000 ft) contour, in the hollow between Manod Mawr's summit and Manod Mawr North Top. Manod Mawr's summit is in the exclusion zone of the Snowdonia National Park around Blaenau Ffestiniog, while Manod Mawr North Top's summit only just misses out on the national park's protection. There were fears the quarry would eventually remove the North Top.

During the Second World War, quarry tunnels in the Manod range were used to store and protect, in secret, valuable paintings from the National Gallery in London.
