= Gallt y Daren =

Mountain (619.4m) in Gwynedd, Wales

Coordinates: 52°53′37″N 3°49′1″W

Gallt y Daren (Foel Boeth)
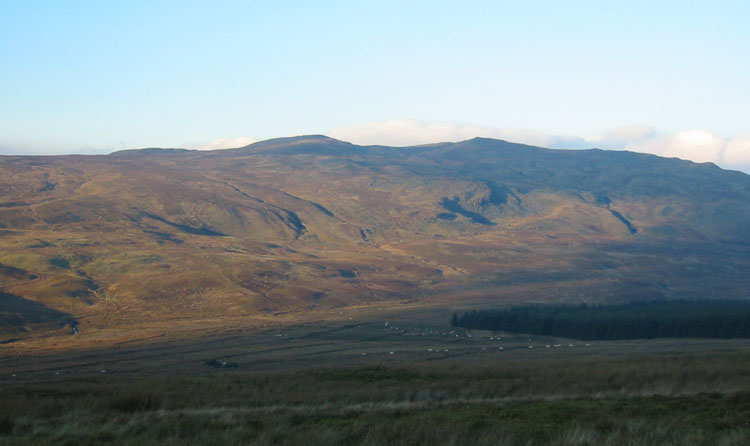
- Foel Boeth (Left) and Gallt y Daren (Right) from Moel Llyfnant

Highest point
- Elevation: 619 m (2,031 ft)
- Prominence: 113 m (371 ft)
- Parent peak: Moel Llyfnant
- Listing: Hewitt, Nuttall, HuMP

Geography
- Location: Gwynedd, Wales
- Parent range: Snowdonia
- OS grid: SH 77857 34467
- Topo map: OS Landranger 124

Listed summits of Gallt y Daren
Name	Grid ref	Height	Status
Foel Boeth		615 m (2,021 ft)	Nuttall

Gallt y Daren is a peak in the southern half of the Snowdonia National Park in Gwynedd, North Wales, and forms part of the Arenig mountain range. It is a top of Moel Llyfnant, and is twin peaked. It lies to the west of Moel Llyfnant.

The summit itself is situated on a rocky outcrop offering extensive views of the Rhinogs and Snowdonia to the north.

The peak is often known as Foel Boeth. However, the Nuttall list includes both the twin tops resulting in the higher top being called Gallt y Daren and the lower top being called Foel Boeth (616m). It lies to the west of Moel Llyfnant.
