= Mynydd Nodol =

Coordinates: 52.9391°N 3.6903°W

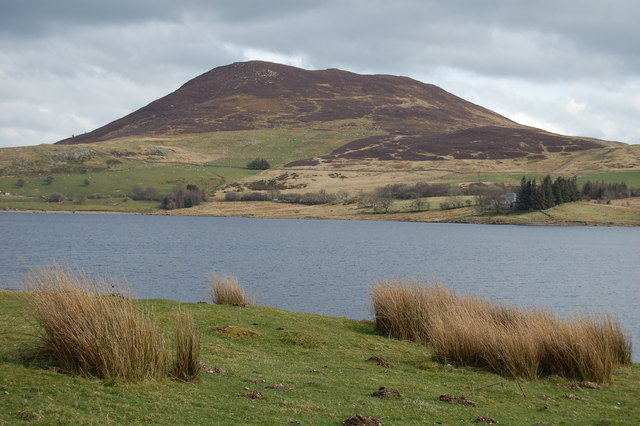

Highest point
- Elevation: 539 m (1,768 ft)
- Prominence: 168 m (551 ft)
- Listing: Marilyn

Naming
- English translation: nodal hill
- Language of name: Welsh

Geography
- Location: Gwynedd, Wales
- Parent range: Arenigs
- OS grid: SH865393
- Topo map: OS Landranger 124 / Explorer OL18

Mynydd Nodol is a 539m high hill in Snowdonia National Park and lying within the community of Llanycil in the county of Gwynedd in North Wales. It rises above the southern shores of the reservoir Llyn Celyn about 4 km northeast of its higher neighbour Arenig Fawr. Mynydd Nodol forms the backdrop in views from the A4212 car park by the dam. The hill throws down a broad shoulder to the east.

== Geology ==
The hill is formed from the acid ash-flow tuffs of the Llyn Conwy Formation of the Ordovician age Aran Volcanic Group. These same erosion-resistant volcanic rocks are responsible for several other hills and mountains in the area. Mudstones of the overlying Nant Hir Formation occur beneath the eastern slopes of the hill. Several intrusions of quartz-latite outcrop around the lower northern and western slopes of Mynydd Nodol though both these and the Nant Hir mudstones are partly obscured by glacial till which mantles the lower ground. There are abandoned manganese mining levels and tips on the hill's northern and western flanks, recorded as being worked intermittently from 1867 for around 40 years.

== Access ==
Almost the entire hill is mapped as open country under the Countryside and Rights of Way Act 2000 thereby giving members of the public the right to walk across it more or less freely. An unfenced minor public road running northwest from Bala fringes the southwestern edge of the hill.
