= Arenig Fach =

Coordinates: 52°57′30″N 3°45′25″W

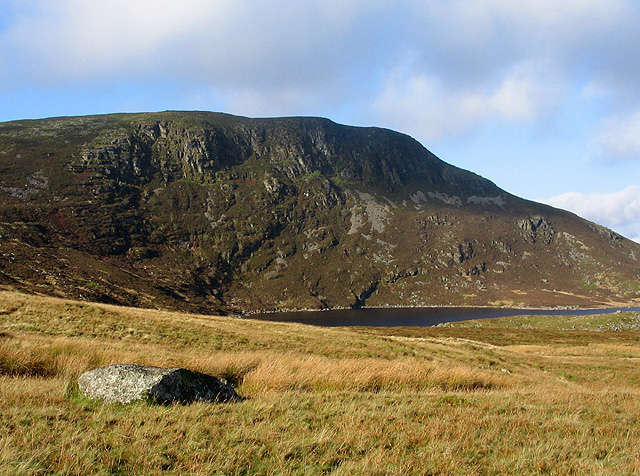
- The north-eastern face of Arenig Fach

Highest point
- Elevation: 689 m (2,260 ft)
- Prominence: 294 m (965 ft)
- Parent peak: Arenig Fawr
- Listing: Marilyn, Hewitt, Nuttall

Naming
- English translation: small high ground
- Language of name: Welsh
- Pronunciation: Welsh: [aˈrɛnɪɡ ˈvaːχ]

Geography
- Location: Gwynedd, Wales
- Parent range: Snowdonia
- OS grid: SH827370
- Topo map: OS Landranger 124

Arenig Fach is a mountain in southern Snowdonia, north Wales. It is a peak in the Arenig range and lies to the north of its parent peak Arenig Fawr.

It lies close to Llyn Celyn alongside the A4212 between Trawsfynydd and Bala. Carnedd y Filiast and Foel Goch (Arenigs) is to the east, while Moel Llyfnant, Gallt y Daren and Arenig Fawr are to the south.

The summit itself is known as Carnedd Bachgen, named after the ancient cairn, Carnedd y Bachgen (which lies just north-east of the summit), and is the highest point at the north end of a wide plateau. There is a trig point and a substantial shelter cairn. The mountain rises from the Migneint moorland and looks like a bulky heathery "lump" from most directions. However, its north-eastern face has steep cliffs with a small corrie lake, Llyn Arenig Fach, at their bottom. The last glacier occupation of this corrie is thought to have happened during the Loch Lomond Stadial.

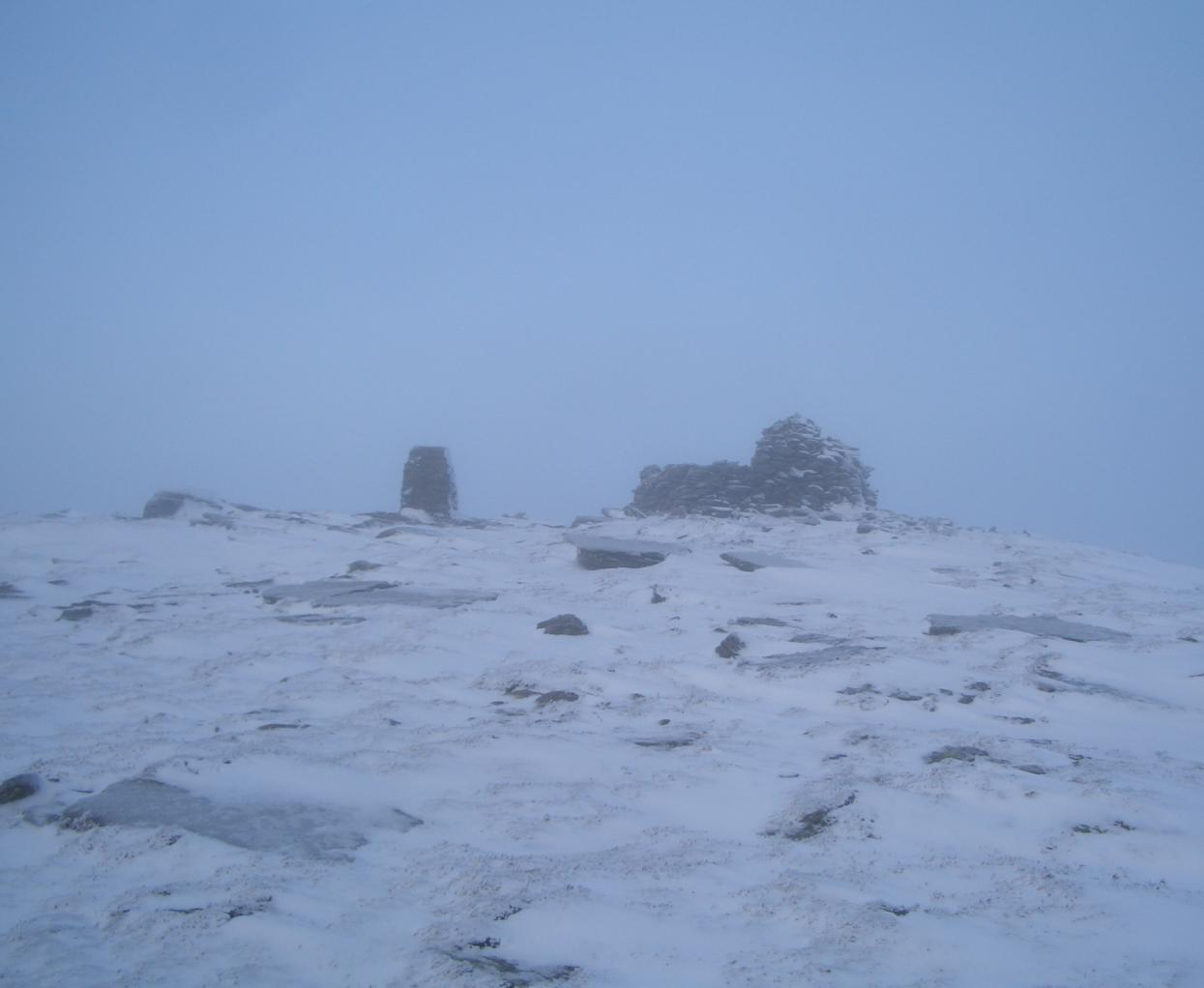
Arenig Fach summit area with Carnedd Bachgen (right)
