= Foel Boeth =

Hill (615.4m) in Gwynedd, Wales

Coordinates: 52°53′29″N 3°48′55″W

Highest point
- Elevation: 615 m (2,018 ft)
- Prominence: 17 m (56 ft)
- Parent peak: Moel Llyfnant
- Listing: Nuttall

Geography
- Location: Gwynedd, Wales
- Parent range: Snowdonia
- OS grid: SH 77967 34195
- Topo map: OS Landranger 124

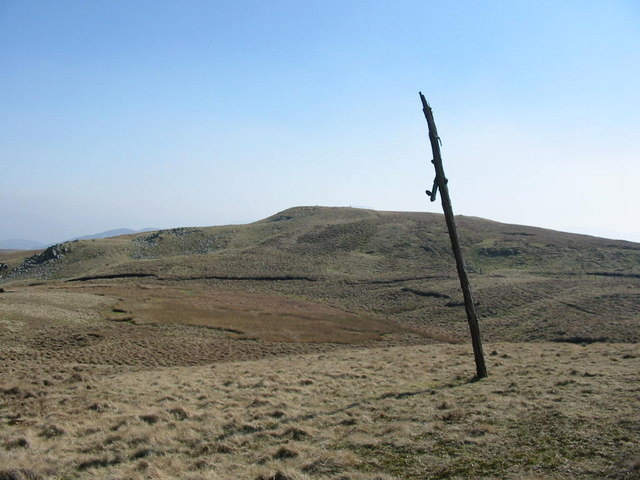
Foel Boeth – The pole carried phone lines when this area was used as a firing range by the army

Foel Boeth is the twin top of Gallt y Daren in the southern half of the Snowdonia National Park in Gwynedd, North Wales, and forms part of the Arenig mountain range. Its parent peak is Moel Llyfnant.

The peak is often known as Foel Boeth, however the Nuttall list includes both the twin tops resulting in the higher top being called Gallt y Daren and the lower top called Foel Boeth.

The summit is grassy and is marked by a small pile of stones.
