= Moel Llyfnant =

Coordinates: 52°54′03″N 3°46′23″W

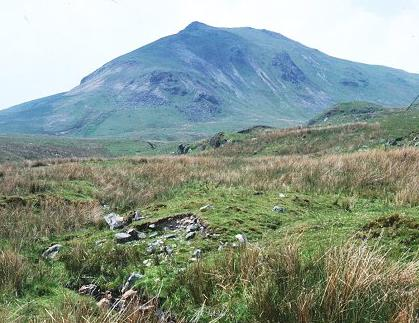
- Moel Llyfnant from the Ffestiniog road

Highest point
- Elevation: 751 m (2,464 ft)
- Prominence: 206 m (676 ft)
- Parent peak: Arenig Fawr
- Listing: Marilyn, Hewitt, Nuttall

Geography
- Location: Gwynedd, Wales
- Parent range: Snowdonia
- OS grid: SH809351
- Topo map: OS Landranger 124

Listed summits of Moel Llyfnant
Name	Grid ref	Height	Status
Gallt y Daren		619 m (2,031 ft)	Hewitt, Nuttall

Moel Llyfnant is a mountain in the southern portion of the Snowdonia National Park in Gwynedd, Wales. It is a peak in the Arenig mountain range. It lies to the west of Arenig Fawr. It has one notable top, the twin peaked Gallt y Daren, being at the end of its west ridge.

The summit area has rocky outcrops, on top of one lies the small cairn that marks the summit. The views of Arenig Fawr are excellent, while to the south Rhobell Fawr and Dduallt can be observed, and to the west Gallt y Daren and Foel Boeth.
