= Arenig Fawr =

Mountain (854m) in Gwynedd, Wales

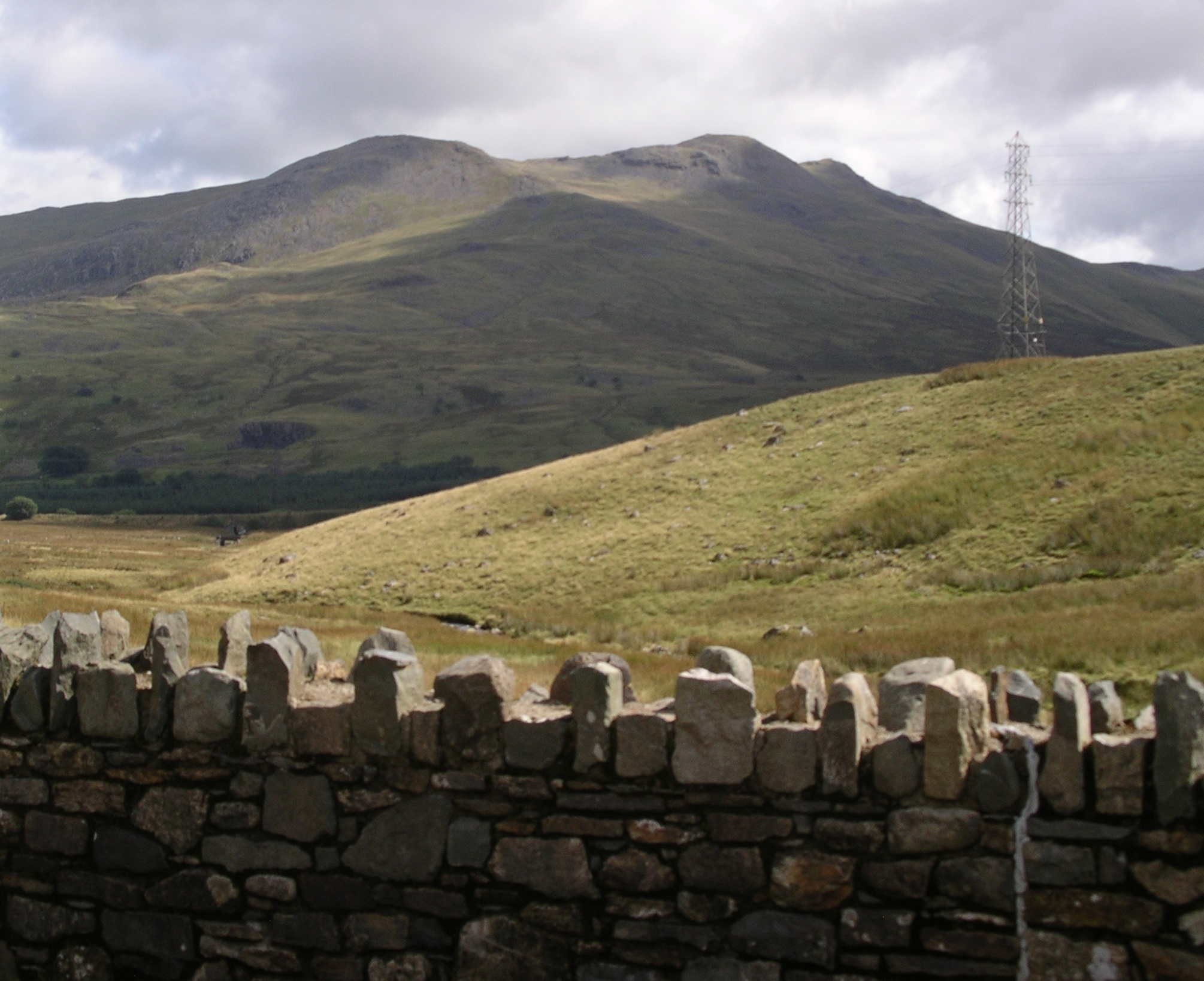
- Arenig Fawr from the A4212 to Ffestiniog.

Highest point
- Elevation: 854 m (2,802 ft)
- Prominence: 479 m (1,572 ft)
- Parent peak: Moel Siabod
- Listing: Marilyn, Hewitt, Nuttall
- Coordinates: 52.91757°N 3.74601°W

Naming
- English translation: great high ground
- Language of name: Welsh
- Pronunciation: Welsh: [aˈrɛnɪɡ ˈvau̯r]

Geography
- Location within Gwynedd
- Location: Gwynedd, Wales
- Parent range: Snowdonia
- OS grid: SH827370
- Topo map: OS Landranger 124

Arenig Fawr (Welsh for 'great high ground') is a mountain in Snowdonia, North Wales, close to Llyn Celyn reservoir, alongside the A4212 between Trawsfynydd and Bala.

== Location ==
Arenig Fawr is the highest member of the Arenig range, with Arenig Fach (Welsh for 'small high ground'), a smaller neighbouring mountain, lying to the north. It is surrounded by Moel Llyfnant to the west, Rhobell Fawr to the south and Mynydd Nodol to the east.

== Ascent ==
The easy-to-moderate climb to the summit takes about 2½ hours from Llyn Celyn. There are no readily identifiable footpaths but the route is marked by an old wire boundary fence. Beneath the mountain is Llyn Arenig Fawr, a reservoir providing drinking water to Bala and the surrounding villages.

The summit, which is also known as Moel yr Eglwys (Welsh for 'Bare hill of the church'), has a trig point and a memorial to eight American aircrew who died when their Flying Fortress bomber B-17F #42-3124 crashed on 4 August 1943. Some of the crash wreckage is still scattered across the hillside 300 m (330 yds) from the memorial location.

From the summit, with good weather conditions, it is possible to see several notable Welsh mountain ranges: the Rhinogydd in the west, Snowdon to the northwest, the Clwydian Hills in the northeast, east to the Berwyns, south east to the Arans, and southward to Cadair Idris. In exceptional conditions the Wicklow Mountains in Ireland, the Blackpool Tower, summits of the Peak District above Manchester, the Lake District, and the Brecon Beacons can also be seen. The furthest peaks visible in perfect conditions are Cross Fell and Great Dun Fell in the far east of Cumbria, Slieve Muck, Slieve Binnian and Slieve Meelbeg in the Mourne Mountains of Northern Ireland, and Blackstairs Mountain on the County Carlow/County Wexford border in the Republic of Ireland.

== Railway ==
Arenig Halt was a request stop on the Bala Ffestiniog Line. It closed to passenger services on 2 January 1960 and freight services on 27 January 1961. The remains of the station buildings have been cleared away leaving no trace.

Listed summits of Arenig Fawr
Name	Grid ref	Height	Status
Arenig Fawr South Top		836 m (2,743 ft)	Nuttall
Arenig Fawr South Ridge Top		712 m (2,336 ft)	Nuttall
Carreg y Diocyn		673 m (2,208 ft)	ex Nuttall

== Art and literature ==
Artists James Dickson Innes and Augustus John used the mountain as a backdrop during their two years of painting in the Arenig valley between 1911 and 1912. In 2011 their work was the subject of a BBC documentary entitled The Mountain That Had to Be Painted.

In The Faerie Queene, an incomplete English epic poem by Sir Edmund Spenser, the home of 'old Timon', Prince Arthur's sage foster-father, "is low in a valley greene, Under the foot of Rauran mossy hore". Welsh historian Sir John Edward Lloyd wrote that Rauran "comes from Saxton's map of Merionethshire (1578), which places 'Rarau uaure Hill' (Yr Aran Fawr) where Arenig should be".

A boulder at a crossroads in the hamlet of Bell Heath, near Belbroughton, Worcestershire, in England, has a brass plaque attached to it stating "Boulder from Arenig Mountain in N. Wales, Brought here by the Welsh Ice-sheet in the Glacial Period".
