= Teigl Halt railway station =

Disused railway station in Gwynedd, Wales

Teigl Halt
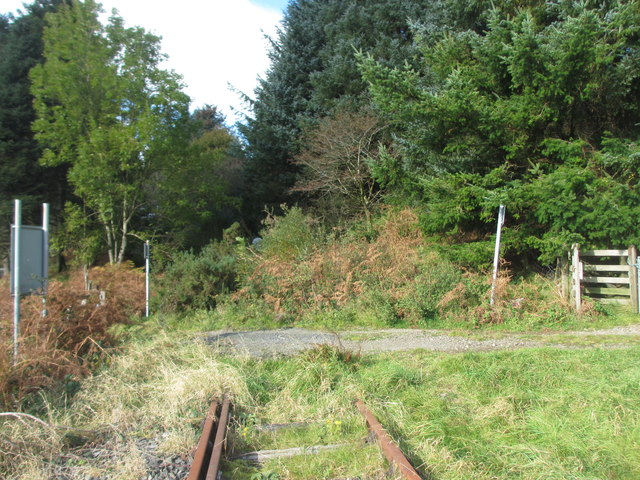
- The site of the station in 2016

General information
- Location: Cwm Teigl, near Blaenau Ffestiniog, Gwynedd; Wales
- Coordinates: 52.9698°N 3.9202°W
- Grid reference: SH 712 430
- Platforms: 1

Other information
- Status: Disused

History
- Original company: Great Western Railway

Key dates
- 14 September 1931: Opened for passengers only
- 18 July 1932: First time in Bradshaw
- 4 January 1960: Closed, but line remained open for goods
- 28 January 1961: Line closed
- 10 April 1964: Line reopened, but not the halt
- 17 October 1998: Line closed and mothballed
Location

Teigl Halt was a solely passenger railway station which served the rural area of Cwm Teigl, south of Blaenau Ffestiniog, Wales.

== Origins ==
The line through the future station site opened in 1883, replacing the 1 ft 11 1/2 in (597 mm) narrow gauge Festiniog and Blaenau Railway which had run along the same route since 1868. Teigl Halt was one of the 198 opened by the Great Western Railway (GWR) between 1927 and 1939, spurred by rising competition with buses and, to a lesser degree, cars.

== Description ==
The unstaffed halt's single platform edge was made of sleepers, the platform itself being infilled with ash and cinders. It was a mere 50 feet (15 m) long, so drivers had instructions to stop ensuring the guard's compartment was alongside. The amenities provided were a Pagoda platform shelter and an oil lamp, with a rough farm occupation crossing at the southern end.

== Neighbouring infrastructure ==
Just south of the crossing, 23 miles 10 chains (37.2 km) from Bala, was a very short siding, physically unconnected to and at right angles to the track. This was for storing Engineering Department's motor trolleys. Staff wishing to make use of this would contact "Control" (the line's controllers and signallers) from Hut No. 19 which stood on the opposite side of the tracks from the platform. This hut contained a telephone and key apparatus enabling staff to take safe possession of the line. When they were given permission to do so they manhandled the trolley onto the "main line", returning it the same way in due course.

A short distance south of the trolley siding, in plain view from the station when looking along the sharply curved track, was the Pont Llefraith bridge over the Afon Teigl. This was replaced in the 1970s. With a radius of just 7 chains (140 m) the curve and a cutting obscured a northbound ("Down") driver's view of an occupation crossing a short distance north of the halt, so a bell operated by a treadle warned road users of a train's approach.

== Services ==
The September 1959 timetable shows

- Northbound
  - three trains calling at all stations from Bala to Blaenau on Monday to Saturday
  - an extra evening train calling at all stations from Bala to Blaenau on Saturday
  - a Monday to Friday train calling at all stations from Bala to Trawsfynydd
    - The journey time from Bala to the halt was around 69 minutes.
- Southbound
  - three trains calling at all stations from Blaenau to Bala on Monday to Saturday
  - two extra trains calling at all stations from Blaenau to Bala on Saturday
  - an extra train calling at all stations from Blaenau to Trawsfynydd on Saturday evening
  - a Monday to Friday train calling at all stations from Blaenau to Bala, except Llafar, Bryncelynog and Cwm Prysor Halts
    - The journey time from Blaenau to the halt was around 11 minutes.
- There was no Sunday service.

In 1935 the Ministry of Transport stated that the halt was used by 70 passengers per week.

After the Second World War at the latest most trains were composed of two carriages, with one regular turn comprising just one brake third coach. At least one train along the line regularly ran as a mixed train, with a second between Bala and Arenig. By that time such trains had become rare on Britain's railways. Workmen's trains had been a feature of the line from the outset; they were the Festiniog and Blaenau Railway's biggest source of revenue. Such a service between Trawsfynydd and Blaenau Ffestiniog survived to the line's closure to passengers in 1960. Up to 1930 at the earliest such services used dedicated, lower standard, coaches which used a specific siding at Blaenau where the men boarded from and alighted to the ballast.

The line from Bala north to Trawsfynydd was designated in the restrictive "Blue" weight limit, with the section from Trawsfynydd to Blaenau limited even more tightly to "Yellow". The literature conjectures on overweight classes being used on troop trains, but no solid claim or photograph has been published. Only two steam age photos of the line show anything other than an 0-4-2 or 0-6-0 tank engine, they being of GWR 2251 Class 0-6-0s taken in the 1940s. As the 1950s passed "5700" and "7400" 0-6-PTs stole the show, exemplified by 9610 at Festiniog in the 1950s. 0-4-2T engines "..suffer[ed] from limited tank capacity and power."

== The halt in film ==
A mirror continuity sequence showing a train crossing the Teigl and reaching the halt features very briefly in an early Cold War spy film starring Elizabeth Taylor.

== Closure and reopening ==
By the 1950s the line was deemed unremunerative. A survey undertaken in 1956 and 1957 found that the average daily numbers of passengers boarding and alighting were:

- Blaenau Ffestiniog Central 62 and 65
- Manod Halt 7 and 4
- Teigl Halt 5 and 5
- Festiniog 28 and 26
- Maentwrog Road 8 and 6
- Trawsfynydd Lake Halt 1 and 1
- Trawsfynydd 28 and 24
- Llafar Halt 2 and 2
- Bryn-celynog Halt 2 and 2
- Cwm Prysor Halt 3 and 3
- Arenig 5 and 5
- Capel Celyn Halt 7 and 8
- Tyddyn Bridge Halt 4 and 6
- Frongoch 18 and 15
- Bala 65 and 58

Freight traffic was not heavy, most arriving and leaving Bala did so from and to the south and that to Blaenau could be handled from the Conwy Valley Line northwards.

In 1957 Parliament authorised Liverpool Corporation to flood a section of the line by damming the Afon Tryweryn. Monies were made available to divert the route round the dam, but it was decided that improving the road from Bala to Llan Ffestiniog would be of greater benefit. Road transport alternatives were established for groups such as schoolchildren and workers. The plans afoot for rail serving Trawsfynydd nuclear power station were to be catered for by building the long-discussed cross-town link between the two Blaenau standard gauge stations. The estimated financial savings to be made were £23,300 by withdrawing the passenger service and £7000 in renewal charges.

The halt closed in January 1960 but freight trains continued to pass the site for a further year. In 1964 the line, but not the halt, reopened from Blaenau southwards through the site of the halt to a siding near the site of Trawsfynydd Lake Halt where a large ("Goliath") gantry was erected to load and unload traffic for the then new Trawsfynydd nuclear power station. The main goods transported were nuclear fuel rods carried in nuclear flasks. The line was also used during the late 1980s for freight traffic to a siding at Maentwrog Road serving the explosives factory in Penrhyndeudraeth.

Passenger trains briefly returned to the line in 1989, passing through to a temporary platform at Maentwrog Road. These trains ran for one summer in an attempt to encourage tourism at the power station. Few people used the service to visit the power station, most riders travelled "for the ride", so the following year tourist trains drove to the line's terminus then reversed, with no-one getting on or off. This service lasted until the end of the 1990 Summer season.

Rail enthusiasts' special trains traversed the line from time to time. Notable examples were two "last trains". The first ran from Bala to Blaenau Ffestiniog and return on 22 January 1961 and in the post-1964 era the "Trawsfynydd Lament" ran southwards to the limit of line at the power station loading point on 17 October 1998, the line having become redundant following removal of nuclear material from the power station.

== The station site in the 21st Century ==
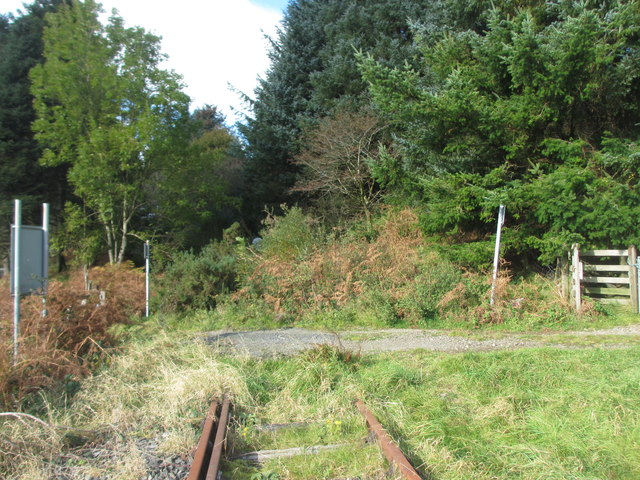
Geograph-5166981-the site of the halt in October 2016

In 2011 part of the platform edge remained. By October 2016 even that had disappeared, with only a low mound remaining under undergrowth to suggest the halt had ever existed, although the mothballed line still ran through the site to the former nuclear flask loading point.

== The future ==
Between 2000 and 2011 there were at least two attempts to put the remaining line to use. In 2011 there were proposals to use the rails as a recreational velorail track. Neither this nor the earlier idea came to anything. The possibility remains that the surviving line could see future preservation or reuse by the nuclear industry.

To considerable local surprise fresh moves to reopen the line from Blaenau as far south as Trawsfynydd began in September 2016, with the formation of The Trawsfynydd & Blaenau Ffestiniog Community Railway Company. On 21 September at least one regional newspaper reported that "Volunteers are set to start work this weekend on clearing vegetation from the trackbed between Blaenau Ffestiniog and Trawsfynydd." The company was quoted as saying "We have been given a licence by Network Rail to clear and survey the line." By mid-October 2016 the company had achieved six working days of track clearance.

| Preceding station | Disused railways | Following station |
|---|---|---|
| Manod; Line mothballed, station closed | Great Western Railway; Bala and Festiniog Railway | Festiniog; Line mothballed, station closed |

== Further material ==
- Baughan, Peter E. (1980). A Regional History of the Railways of Great Britain: Volume 11 North and Mid Wales (1st ed.). Newton Abbot: David & Charles. ISBN 978-0-7153-7850-2. OCLC 6823219.
- Ferris, Tom (2004) [1961]. British Railways Volume 4 - Bewdley To Blaenau (DVD). demanddvd. DEMDVD084.
- Turner, Alun (2003). Gwynedd's Lost Railways. Catrine: Stenlake Publishing. ISBN 978-1-84033-259-9.
