= Cwm Prysor Halt railway station =

Disused railway station in Gwynedd, Wales

Cwm Prysor Halt
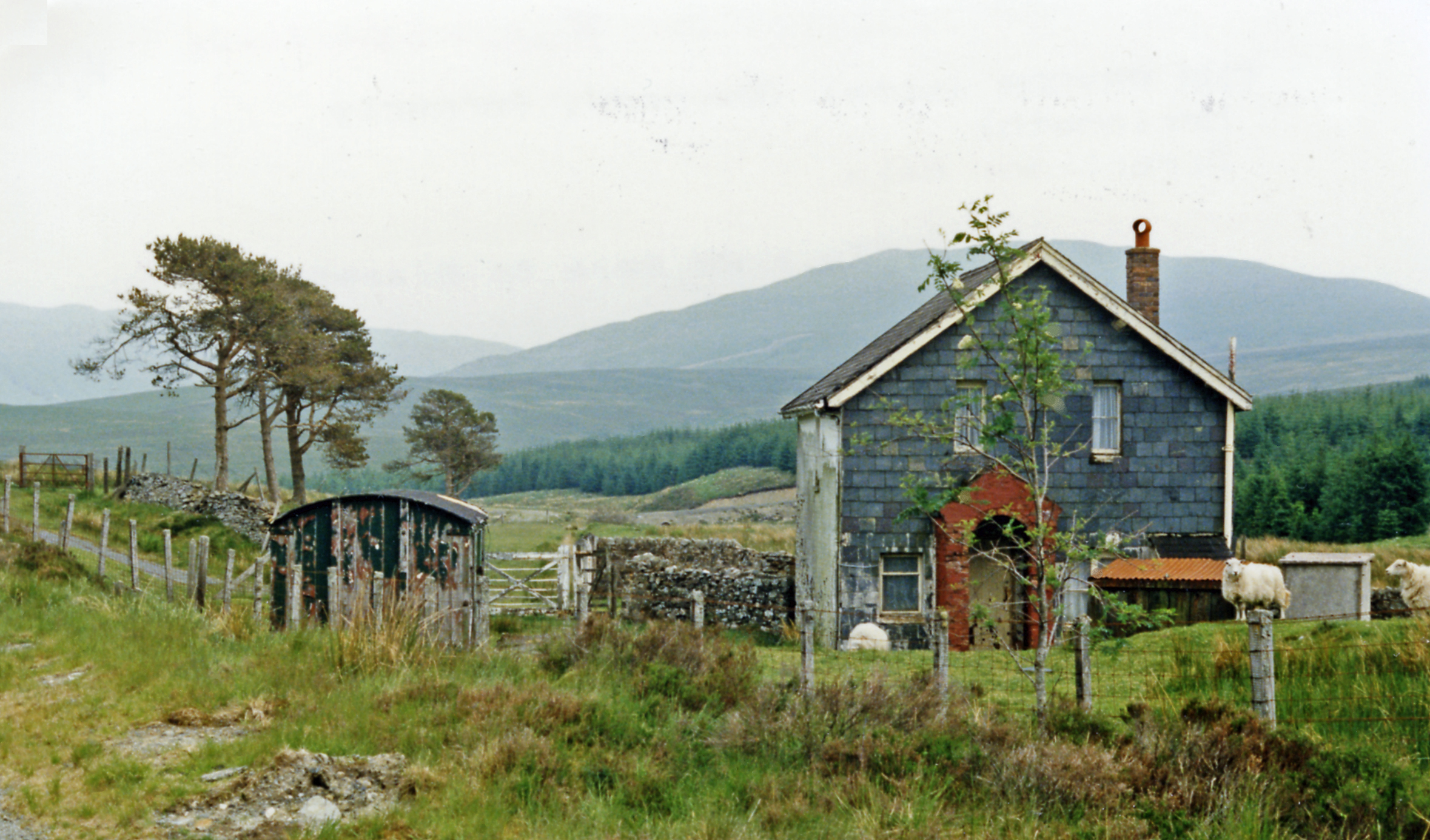
- Remains of the station (1986)

General information
- Location: Between Trawsfynydd and Bala, Gwynedd; Wales
- Coordinates: 52.9291°N 3.7989°W
- Grid reference: SH 791 385
- Platforms: 1

Other information
- Status: Disused

History
- Original company: Great Western Railway

Key dates
- 1 November 1882: Line opened
- 1 September 1902: Station opened as Cwm Prysor
- 8 June 1953: Renamed Cwm Prysor Halt
- 4 January 1960: Closed, but line remained open for goods
- 28 January 1961: Line closed
Location

Cwm Prysor Halt (named simply Cwm Prysor until 1953) was a railway station which served the remote rural area of Cwm Prysor, east of Trawsfynydd, Gwynedd, Wales.

== Origins ==
In 1882 the Bala and Ffestiniog Railway opened the line from Bala Junction to a temporary terminus at Festiniog, Trawsfynydd was one of the stations opened with the line; the future Cwm Prysor Halt would be on this line, east of Trawsfynydd. At Festiniog passengers had to transfer to narrow gauge trains if they wished to continue northwards. To do this people travelling from Bala to Blaenau or beyond walked the few yards from the standard gauge train to the narrow gauge train, much as they do today between the Conwy Valley Line and the Ffestiniog Railway at Blaenau Ffestiniog.

The following year the narrow gauge line was converted to standard gauge, but narrow gauge trains continued to run until 5 September 1883 using a third rail. Standard gauge trains first ran through from Bala to Blaenau Ffestiniog on 10 September 1883. The line was taken over by the Great Western Railway in 1910.

Cwm Prysor was a later addition to the line, opened in 1902. At 1,278 feet (390 m) it stood at the summit of the route in very thinly populated uplands with no obvious source of traffic, for example, the station house's nearest neighbour was a mile away. Conversely, the people who did live and work in the area had no other obvious means of transport. The location served traffic purposes as much as being a point where goods and passengers boarded or alighted, in that:

- staff or the public could use the station and signalbox to warn of snow or other severe weather blockages
- the signalbox broke up an otherwise very long section, which could result in trains being stuck or held for very long periods
- a passing loop was installed in 1908, primarily used by troop trains to or from Trawsfynydd Camp
- the level crossing next to the station was operated by railway staff until the last.

== Description ==
The unstaffed halt's single platform's edge was made of wood, the platform itself being infilled with ash and cinders. It was a mere 100 feet (30 m) long, sufficient for just two coaches to draw alongside at one time, though one or two coach trains were normal in later years. The amenities provided were a platform shelter and an oil lamp; access was by a country lane.

The Stationmistress who ran Cwm Prysor station - Harriet James - lived at Trawsfynydd and had to cycle nearly 5 miles (8 km) each day to Cwm Prysor through open terrain.

== Services ==
The station enjoyed its best passenger services in its closing years. Until 3 July 1938 Cwm Prysor was a request stop, but after that date most trains were timetabled to call.

The September 1959 timetable shows

- Northbound
  - three trains calling at all stations from Bala to Blaenau on Monday to Saturday
  - an extra evening train calling at all stations from Bala to Blaenau on Saturday
  - a Monday to Friday train calling at all stations from Bala to Trawsfynydd
- The journey time from Bala to Cwm Prysor Halt was around 30 minutes.
- Southbound
  - three trains calling at all stations from Blaenau to Bala on Monday to Saturday
  - two extra trains calling at all stations from Blaenau to Bala on Saturday
  - an extra train calling at all stations from Blaenau to Trawsfynydd on Saturday evening
  - a Monday to Friday train calling at all stations from Blaenau to Bala, except Llafar, Bryn-celynog and Cwm Prysor Halts
- The journey time from Blaenau to Cwm Prysor Halt was 50 minutes, except for one Saturdays Only train which took one hour and 13 minutes because it sat at Trawsfynydd for 25 minutes.
- There was no Sunday service.

After the Second World War at the latest most trains were composed of two carriages, with one regular turn comprising just one brake third coach. At least one train along the line regularly ran as a mixed train, with a second between Bala and Arenig. By that time such trains had become rare on Britain's railways. Workmen's trains had been a feature of the line from the outset; they were the Festiniog and Blaenau Railway's biggest source of revenue. Such a service between Trawsfynydd and Blaenau Ffestiniog survived to the line's closure to passengers in 1960. Up to 1930 at the earliest such services used dedicated, lower standard, coaches which used a specific siding at Blaenau where the men boarded from and alighted to the ballast.

== Closure ==
By the 1950s the line was deemed unremunerative. A survey undertaken in 1956 and 1957 found that the average daily numbers of passengers boarding and alighting were:

- Blaenau Ffestiniog Central 62 and 65
- Manod 7 and 4
- Teigl Halt 5 and 5
- Festiniog 28 and 26
- Maentwrog Road 8 and 6
- Trawsfynydd Lake Halt 1 and 1
- Trawsfynydd 28 and 24
- Llafar Halt 2 and 2
- Bryn-Celynog Halt 2 and 2
- Cwm Prysor Halt 3 and 3
- Arenig 5 and 5
- Capel Celyn Halt 7 and 8
- Tyddyn Bridge Halt 4 and 6
- Frongoch 18 and 15
- Bala 65 and 58

Military traffic had ended and, apart from a finite contract to bring cement to Blaenau in connection with the construction of Ffestiniog Power Station freight traffic was not heavy, most arriving and leaving Bala did so from and to the south and that to Blaenau could be handled from the Conwy Valley Line northwards.

In 1957 Parliament authorised Liverpool Corporation to flood a section of the line by damming the Afon Tryweryn. Monies were made available to divert the route round the dam, but it was decided that improving the road from Bala to Llan Ffestiniog would be of greater benefit. Road transport alternatives were established for groups such as schoolchildren and workers. The plans afoot for rail serving Trawsfynydd nuclear power station were to be catered for by building the long-discussed cross-town link between the two Blaenau standard gauge stations. The estimated financial savings to be made were £23,300 by withdrawing the passenger service and £7000 in renewal charges.

The halt closed in January 1960 but freight services between Bala and Blaenau continued for a further year, the last train of all passing on 27 January 1961. The track though the halt was lifted in the 1960s.

In 1964 the line reopened from Blaenau southwards to a siding near the site of Trawsfynydd Lake Halt where a large ("Goliath") gantry was erected to load and unload traffic for the then new Trawsfynydd nuclear power station. The main goods transported were nuclear fuel rods carried in nuclear flasks. The new facility was nearly eight route miles north of Cwm Prysor Halt, so the reopening brought no reprieve.

== Special trains ==
Rail enthusiasts' special trains traversed the line from time to time, notably the "last train" from Bala to Blaenau Ffestiniog and return on 22 January 1961.

== The halt and art ==
The mountainous countryside around Arenig was of particular interest to James Dickson Innes who introduced his friend Augustus John to the area. Innes painted several works which have been publicly displayed to some renown, such as "Arenig, North Wales". He and his friend are known to have used the railway as a means of getting to remote spots, as well as to arrive and depart for London and elsewhere, Cwm Prysor and its stationmistress being specifically mentioned in at least one resume of Innes's life and work.

== The station site in the 21st century ==
In 2015 the station building was in use as a private residence. The trackbed in both directions from the halt was clearly defined both on satellite imagery and on the ground.

== The future ==
Between 2000 and 2011 there were at least two attempts to put the remaining line to use, but none of these aspired to come close to the site of the halt. As the line of route to the east has been severed by Llyn Celyn the prospects of revival must be very remote.

To considerable local surprise fresh moves to reopen the line from Blaenau as far south as Trawsfynydd began in September 2016, with the formation of The Trawsfynydd & Blaenau Ffestiniog Community Railway Company. On 21 September at least one regional newspaper reported that "Volunteers are set to start work this weekend on clearing vegetation from the trackbed between Blaenau Ffestiniog and Trawsfynydd." The company was quoted as saying "We have been given a licence by Network Rail to clear and survey the line."

Preceding station	Disused railways	Following station
Bryn-Celynog Halt; Line and station closed	Great Western Railway; Bala and Festiniog Railway	Arenig; Line and station closed

== See also ==
- Cwm Prysor Viaduct

== Further material ==
- Baughan, Peter E. (1980). A Regional History of the Railways of Great Britain: Volume 11 North and Mid Wales (1st ed.). Newton Abbot: David & Charles. ISBN 978-0-7153-7850-2. OCLC 6823219.
- Ferris, Tom (2004) [1961]. British Railways Volume 4 - Bewdley To Blaenau (DVD). demanddvd. DEMDVD084.
- Wells, Jeffrey (June 2016). Blakemore, Michael (ed.). "The Opening of Railway Halts 1930-1935". Back Track. 30 (6). Easingwold: Pendragon Publishing.
