= Manod railway station =

Disused railway station in Gwynedd, Wales

Manod
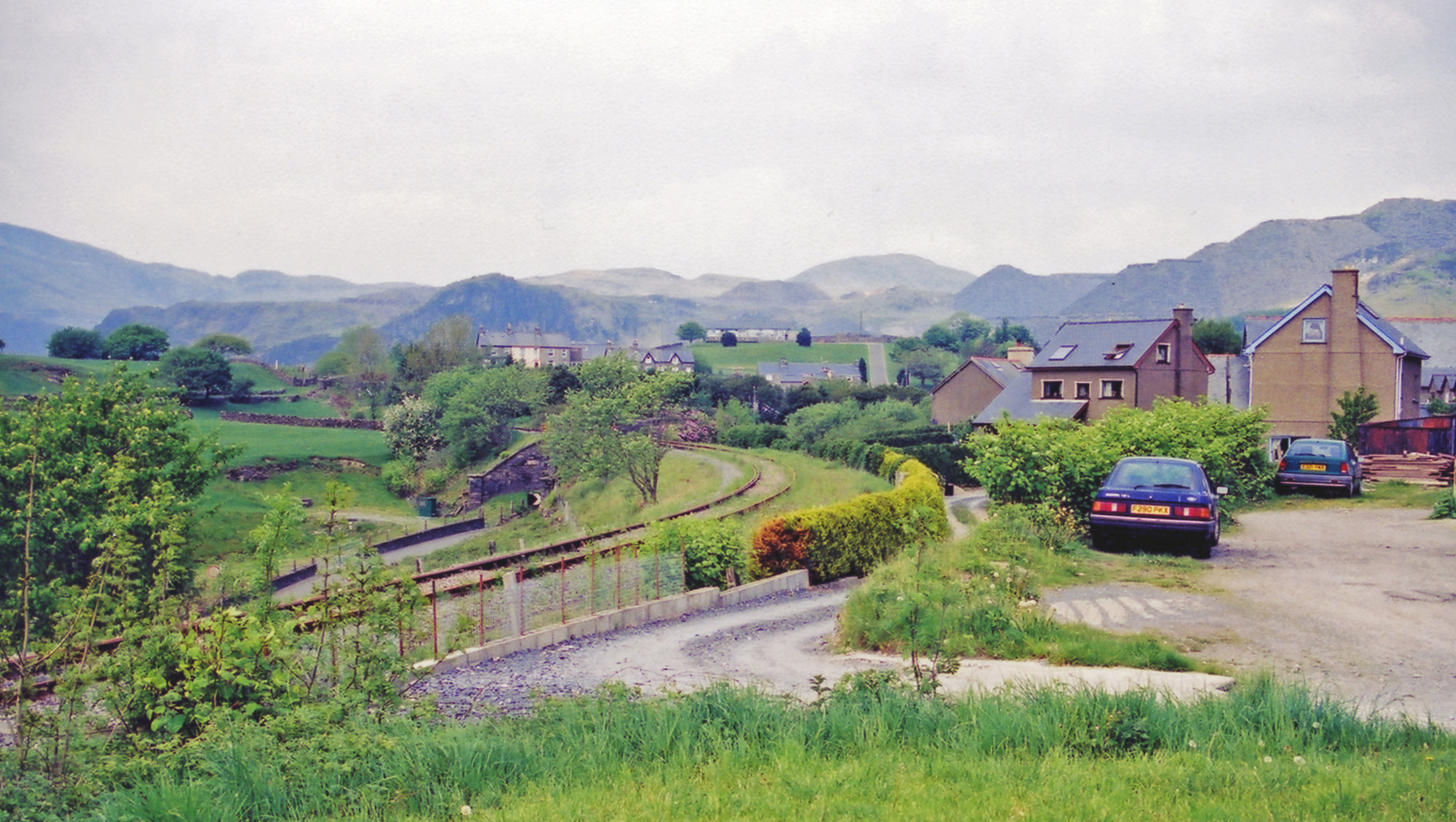
- Location of the station in 2001

General information
- Location: Manod, Blaenau Ffestiniog, Gwynedd; Wales
- Coordinates: 52.9819°N 3.9314°W
- Grid reference: SH 704 444
- Platforms: 1

Other information
- Status: Disused

History
- Original company: Festiniog and Blaenau Railway
- Post-grouping: Great Western Railway

Key dates
- 10 September 1883: Opened as standard gauge "Manod"
- 1 January 1917: Closed
- 5 May 1919: Reopened
- 4 January 1960: Closed to passengers
- 27 January 1961: Closed completely
Location

Manod railway station served the village of Manod which then stood on the southern edge of Blaenau Ffestiniog in Gwynedd, Wales.

== Origins ==
The 1 ft 11 1/2 in (597 mm) narrow gauge Festiniog and Blaenau Railway (F&BR) opened Tyddyngwyn station on 29 May 1868 to serve the then small community of Manod. That station was named after a house nearby. The F&BR's primary traffic was passengers, and workmen in particular, with goods traffic small by comparison. Receipts in 1879, for example, included £1409 from passengers against £416 for goods. Some slate was loaded at Festiniog, but the biggest single source was Craig Ddu Quarry which built a striking four-pitch incline to meet the F&BR near its Tan-y-Manod station, half a mile north of Tyddyngwyn station.

On 1 September 1882 the GWR standard gauge Bala Ffestiniog Line reached Llan Ffestiniog from the south. The following year the narrow gauge line was converted to standard gauge but narrow gauge trains continued to run until 5 September 1883 using a third rail. The standard gauge line's official opening was on 10 September 1883; Manod station had been completed just in time to open with the line. Manod station was very slightly south of Tyddyngwyn station, which it replaced.

== Services ==
The September 1959 timetable shows

- Northbound
  - three trains calling at all stations from Bala to Blaenau on Monday to Saturday
  - an extra evening train calling at all stations from Bala to Blaenau on Saturday
  - a Monday to Friday train calling at all stations from Bala to Trawsfynydd
    - The journey time from Bala to Manod was around 90 minutes.
- Southbound
  - three trains calling at all stations from Blaenau to Bala on Monday to Saturday
  - two extra trains calling at all stations from Blaenau to Bala on Saturday
  - an extra train calling at all stations from Blaenau to Trawsfynydd on Saturday evening
  - a Monday to Friday train calling at all stations from Blaenau to Bala, except Llafar, Bryn-celynog and Cwm Prysor Halts
    - The journey time from Blaenau to Manod was around 5 minutes.
- There was no Sunday service.

This timetable refers to "Manod Halt", as the station had been reduced to an unstaffed halt in 1955.

After the Second World War at the latest most trains were composed of two carriages, with one regular turn comprising just one brake third coach. At least one train along the line regularly ran as a mixed train, with a second between Bala and Arenig. By that time such trains had become rare on Britain's railways. Workmen's trains had been a feature of the line from the outset; they were the Festiniog and Blaenau Railway's biggest source of revenue. Such a service between Trawsfynydd and Blaenau Ffestiniog called at Manod and survived to the line's closure to passengers in 1960. Up to 1930 at the earliest such services used dedicated, lower standard, coaches which used a specific siding at Blaenau where the men boarded from and alighted to the ballast.

The line from Bala north to Trawsfynydd was designated in the restrictive "Blue" weight limit, with the section from Trawsfynydd to Blaenau limited even more tightly to "Yellow". The literature conjectures on overweight classes being used on troop trains, but no solid claim or photograph has been published. Only three steam age photos of the line show anything other than an 0-4-2 or 0-6-0 tank engine, they being of GWR 2251 Class 0-6-0s taken in the 1940s. As the 1950s passed "5700" and "7400" 0-6-PTs stole the show, exemplified by 9610 at Festiniog in the 1950s. 0-4-2T engines "..suffer[ed] from limited tank capacity and power."

== Manod in the Second World War ==
During the war many works of art from galleries in London were stored in slate caverns at Manod. The access road to the quarry ran from Llan Ffestiniog rather than the village of Manod, so the treasures were brought by the GWR to Festiniog station where they were put onto lorries for the last leg of their journey. Some of the paintings were so large that the roadway under the bridge north of Festiniog station had to be lowered.

== The station in film ==
The station features briefly as the fictional "Llandridd" in an early Cold War spy film starring Elizabeth Taylor.

== Closure and reopening ==
By the 1950s the line was deemed unremunerative. A survey undertaken in 1956 and 1957 found that the average daily numbers of passengers boarding and alighting were:

- Blaenau Ffestiniog Central 62 and 65
- Manod 7 and 4
- Teigl Halt 5 and 5
- Festiniog 28 and 26
- Maentwrog Road 8 and 6
- Trawsfynydd Lake Halt 1 and 1
- Trawsfynydd 28 and 24
- Llafar Halt 2 and 2
- Bryn-Celynog Halt 2 and 2
- Cwm Prysor Halt 3 and 3
- Arenig 5 and 5
- Capel Celyn Halt 7 and 8
- Tyddyn Bridge Halt 4 and 6
- Frongoch 18 and 15
- Bala 65 and 58

Military traffic had ended and, apart from a finite contract to bring cement to Blaenau in connection with the construction of Ffestiniog Power Station freight traffic was not heavy, most arriving and leaving Bala did so from and to the south and that to Blaenau could be handled from the Conwy Valley Line northwards.

In 1957 Parliament authorised Liverpool Corporation to flood a section of the line by damming the Afon Tryweryn. Monies were made available to divert the route round the dam, but it was decided that improving the road from Bala to Llan Ffestiniog would be of greater benefit. Road transport alternatives were established for groups such as schoolchildren and workers. The plans afoot for rail serving Trawsfynydd nuclear power station were to be catered for by building the long-discussed cross-town link between the two Blaenau standard gauge stations. The estimated financial savings to be made were £23,300 by withdrawing the passenger service and £7000 in renewal charges.

The line and station closed to passengers in January 1960 and to freight a year later, with the last train picking up one coal wagon at Manod and leaving another, whose fate is unrecorded. In 1964 the cross-Blaenau link was completed, enabling the line to reopen from Blaenau southwards through the station site to a siding near the site of Trawsfynydd Lake Halt where a large ("Goliath") gantry was erected to load and unload traffic for the then new Trawsfynydd nuclear power station. The main goods transported were nuclear fuel rods carried in nuclear flasks to and from Calder Hall in Cumbria (later known as Sellafield). The line was also used during the late 1980s for freight traffic to a siding at Maentwrog Road serving the explosives factory in Penrhyndeudraeth.

Passenger trains briefly returned to the line in 1989, passing through to a temporary platform at Maentwrog Road. These trains ran for one summer in an attempt to encourage tourism at the power station. Few people used the service to visit the power station, most riders travelled "for the ride", so the following year tourist trains drove to the line's terminus then reversed, with no-one getting on or off.

Rail enthusiasts' special trains traversed the line from time to time. Notable examples were two "last trains". The first ran from Bala to Blaenau Ffestiniog and return on 22 January 1961 and in the post-1964 era the "Trawsfynydd Lament" ran southwards to the limit of line at the power station loading point on 17 October 1998, the line having become redundant following removal of nuclear material from the power station.

== The station site in the 21st century ==
The station and sidings had been completely demolished by 2011, although in Spring 2016 the mothballed line still ran through the site to the former nuclear flask loading point.

== The future ==
Between 2000 and 2011 there were at least two attempts to put the remaining line to use. In 2011 there were proposals to use the rails as a recreational velorail track. Neither this nor the earlier idea came to anything. The possibility remains that the surviving line could see future preservation or reuse by the nuclear industry.

To considerable local surprise fresh moves to reopen the line from Blaenau as far south as Trawsfynydd began in September 2016, with the formation of The Trawsfynydd & Blaenau Ffestiniog Community Railway Company. On 21 September at least one regional newspaper reported that "Volunteers are set to start work this weekend on clearing vegetation from the trackbed between Blaenau Ffestiniog and Trawsfynydd." The company was quoted as saying "We have been given a licence by Network Rail to clear and survey the line." By mid-October 2016 the company had achieved six working days of track clearance.

Preceding station	Disused railways	Following station
Blaenau Ffestiniog; Line mothballed, station open	Great Western Railway; Bala and Festiniog Railway	Festiniog; 1882-1931 Line mothballed, station closed
Blaenau Ffestiniog; Line mothballed, station open	Great Western Railway; Bala and Festiniog Railway	Teigl Halt; 1931-1960 Line mothballed, station closed

== Further material ==
- Ferris, Tom (2004) [1961]. British Railways Volume 4 - Bewdley To Blaenau (DVD). demanddvd. DEMDVD084.
- Turner, Alun (2003). Gwynedd's Lost Railways. Catrine, Ayrshire: Stenlake Publishing. ISBN 978-1-84033-259-9.
