= Llafar Halt railway station =

Disused railway station in Gwynedd, Wales

Llafar Halt

General information
- Location: Glanllafar, near Trawsfynydd, Gwynedd; Wales
- Coordinates: 52.9099°N 3.8854°W
- Grid reference: SH 733 364
- Platforms: 1

Other information
- Status: Disused

History
- Original company: Great Western Railway

Key dates
- 1 November 1882: Line opened
- 1 March 1932: Halt opened for passengers only
- 4 January 1960: Closed, but line remained open for goods
- 28 January 1961: Line closed
Location

Llafar Halt was an unstaffed solely passenger railway station which served the rural area of Glanllafar, east of Trawsfynydd, Gwynedd, Wales.

== Origins ==
In 1882 the Bala and Ffestiniog Railway opened the line from Bala Junction to a temporary terminus at Festiniog, Trawsfynydd was one of the stations opened with the line; the future Llafar Halt would be on this line, east of Trawsfynydd. At Festiniog passengers had to transfer to narrow gauge trains if they wished to continue northwards. To do this people travelling from Bala to Blaenau or beyond walked the few yards from the standard gauge train to the narrow gauge train much as they do today between the Conwy Valley Line and the Ffestiniog Railway at Blaenau Ffestiniog.

The following year the narrow gauge line was converted to standard gauge, but narrow gauge trains continued to run until 5 September 1883 using a third rail. Standard gauge trains first ran through from Bala to Blaenau Ffestiniog on 10 September 1883. The line was taken over by the Great Western Railway in 1910.

Llafar Halt was one of the 198 opened by the Great Western Railway (GWR) between 1927 and 1939, spurred by rising competition with buses and, to a lesser degree, cars. The halt stood in very thinly populated uplands with no obvious source of traffic; conversely, the people who did live, work and increasingly take leisure activities in the area had no other obvious means of transport.

== Description ==
The unstaffed halt's single platform's edge was made of sleepers, the platform itself being infilled with ash and cinders. It was a mere 50 feet (15 m) long, so drivers had instructions to stop ensuring the guard's compartment was alongside. The amenities provided were a Pagoda platform shelter and an oil lamp; access was by a footpath only.

== Services ==
The September 1959 timetable shows

- Northbound
  - three trains calling at all stations from Bala to Blaenau on Monday to Saturday
  - an extra evening train calling at all stations from Bala to Blaenau on Saturday
  - a Monday to Friday train calling at all stations from Bala to Trawsfynydd
- The journey time from Bala to Llafar Halt was around 40 minutes.
- Southbound
  - three trains calling at all stations from Blaenau to Bala on Monday to Saturday
  - two extra trains calling at all stations from Blaenau to Bala on Saturday
  - an extra train calling at all stations from Blaenau to Trawsfynydd on Saturday evening
  - a Monday to Friday train calling at all stations from Blaenau to Bala, except Llafar, Bryn-celynog and Cwm Prysor Halts
- The journey time from Blaenau to Llafar Halt was 35 minutes, except for one Saturdays Only train which took an hour because it sat at Trawsfynydd for 25 minutes.
- There was no Sunday service.

After the Second World War at the latest most trains were composed of two carriages, with one regular turn comprising just one brake third coach. At least one train along the line regularly ran as a mixed train, with a second between Bala and Arenig. By that time such trains had become rare on Britain's railways. Workmen's trains had been a feature of the line from the outset; they were the Festiniog and Blaenau Railway's biggest source of revenue. Such a service between Trawsfynydd and Blaenau Ffestiniog survived to the line's closure to passengers in 1960. Up to 1930 at the earliest such services used dedicated, lower standard, coaches which used a specific siding at Blaenau where the men boarded from and alighted to the ballast.

== Closure ==
By the 1950s the line was deemed unremunerative. A survey undertaken in 1956 and 1957 found that the average daily numbers of passengers boarding and alighting were:

- Blaenau Ffestiniog Central 62 and 65
- Manod Halt 7 and 4
- Teigl Halt 5 and 5
- Festiniog 28 and 26
- Maentwrog Road 8 and 6
- Trawsfynydd Lake Halt 1 and 1
- Trawsfynydd 28 and 24
- Llafar Halt 2 and 2
- Bryn-Celynog Halt 2 and 2
- Cwm Prysor Halt 3 and 3
- Arenig 5 and 5
- Capel Celyn Halt 7 and 8
- Tyddyn Bridge Halt 4 and 6
- Frongoch 18 and 15
- Bala 65 and 58

Military traffic had ended and, apart from a finite contract to bring cement to Blaenau in connection with the construction of Ffestiniog Power Station freight traffic was not heavy, most arriving and leaving Bala did so from and to the south and that to Blaenau could be handled from the Conwy Valley Line northwards.

In 1957 Parliament authorised Liverpool Corporation to flood a section of the line by damming the Afon Tryweryn. Monies were made available to divert the route round the dam, but it was decided that improving the road from Bala to Llan Ffestiniog would be of greater benefit. Road transport alternatives were established for groups such as schoolchildren and workers. The plans afoot for rail serving Trawsfynydd nuclear power station were to be catered for by building the long-discussed cross-town link between the two Blaenau standard gauge stations. The estimated financial savings to be made were £23,300 by withdrawing the passenger service and £7000 in renewal charges.

The halt closed in January 1960 but freight trains between Bala and Blaenau continued to pass the site for a further year, the last train of all passing on 27 January 1961. The track though the halt was lifted in the 1960s.

In 1964 the line reopened from Blaenau southwards to a siding near the site of Trawsfynydd Lake Halt where a large ("Goliath") gantry was erected to load and unload traffic for the then new Trawsfynydd nuclear power station. The main goods transported were nuclear fuel rods carried in nuclear flasks. The new facility was over three route miles north of Llafar Halt, so the reopening brought no reprieve.

== Special trains ==
Rail enthusiasts' special trains traversed the line from time to time, notably the "last train" from Bala to Blaenau Ffestiniog and return on 22 January 1961.

== The station site in the 21st Century ==
By 2012 there was little evidence that the halt had ever existed, though the trackbed was clearly defined both on satellite imagery and on the ground.

== The future ==
Between 2000 and 2011 there were at least two attempts to put the remaining line to use, but none of these aspired to come close to the site of the halt. As the line of route to the east has been severed by Llyn Celyn the prospects of revival must be very remote.

To considerable local surprise, fresh moves to reopen the line from Blaenau as far south as Trawsfynydd began in September 2016, with the formation of The Trawsfynydd & Blaenau Ffestiniog Community Railway Company. On 21 September at least one regional newspaper reported that "Volunteers are set to start work this weekend on clearing vegetation from the trackbed between Blaenau Ffestiniog and Trawsfynydd." The company was quoted as saying "We have been given a licence by Network Rail to clear and survey the line."

Preceding station	Disused railways	Following station
Trawsfynydd; Line and station closed	Great Western Railway; Bala and Festiniog Railway	Bryn-Celynog Halt; Line and station closed

== Further material ==
- Baughan, Peter E. (1980). A Regional History of the Railways of Great Britain: Volume 11 North and Mid Wales (1st ed.). Newton Abbot: David & Charles. ISBN 978-0-7153-7850-2. OCLC 6823219.
- Boyd, James I.C. (October 1959). Mansell, K.G. (ed.). "Bala & Festiniog Section - W.R.". Railway World. 20 (233). London: Railway World Limited.
- Ferris, Tom (2004) [1961]. British Railways Volume 4 - Bewdley To Blaenau (DVD). demanddvd. DEMDVD084.
- Turner, Alun (2003). Gwynedd's Lost Railways. Catrine: Stenlake Publishing. ISBN 978-1-84033-259-9.
