= GWR pagoda platform shelter =

Type of railway platform shelter

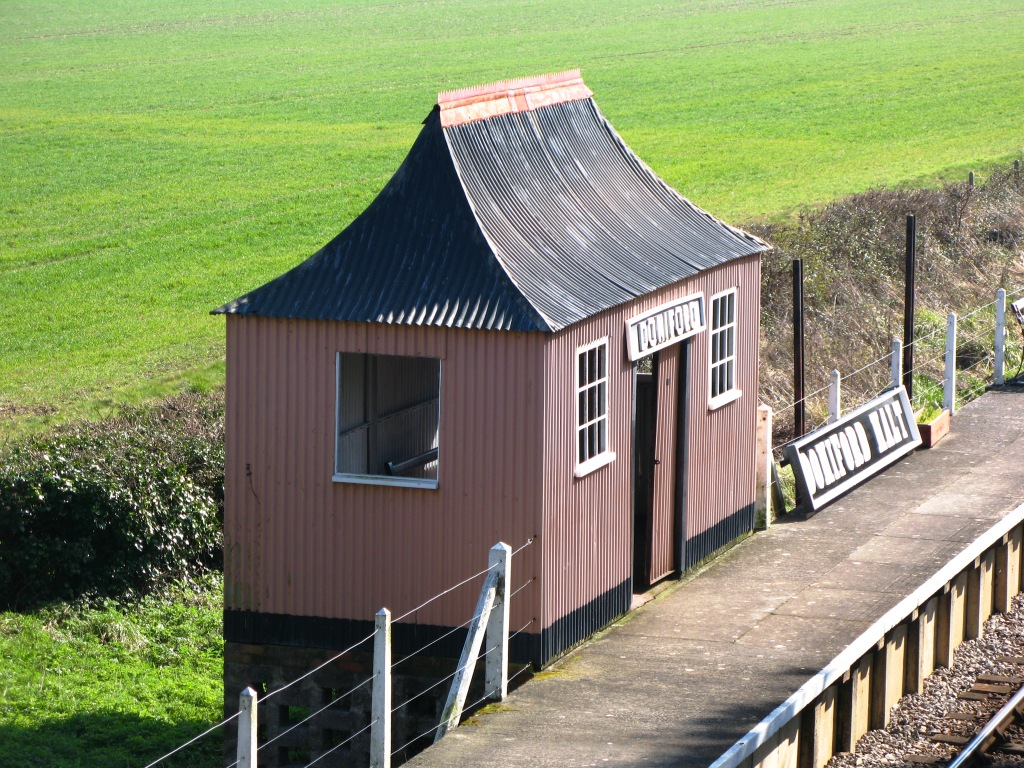
Pagoda shelter at Doniford Halt.

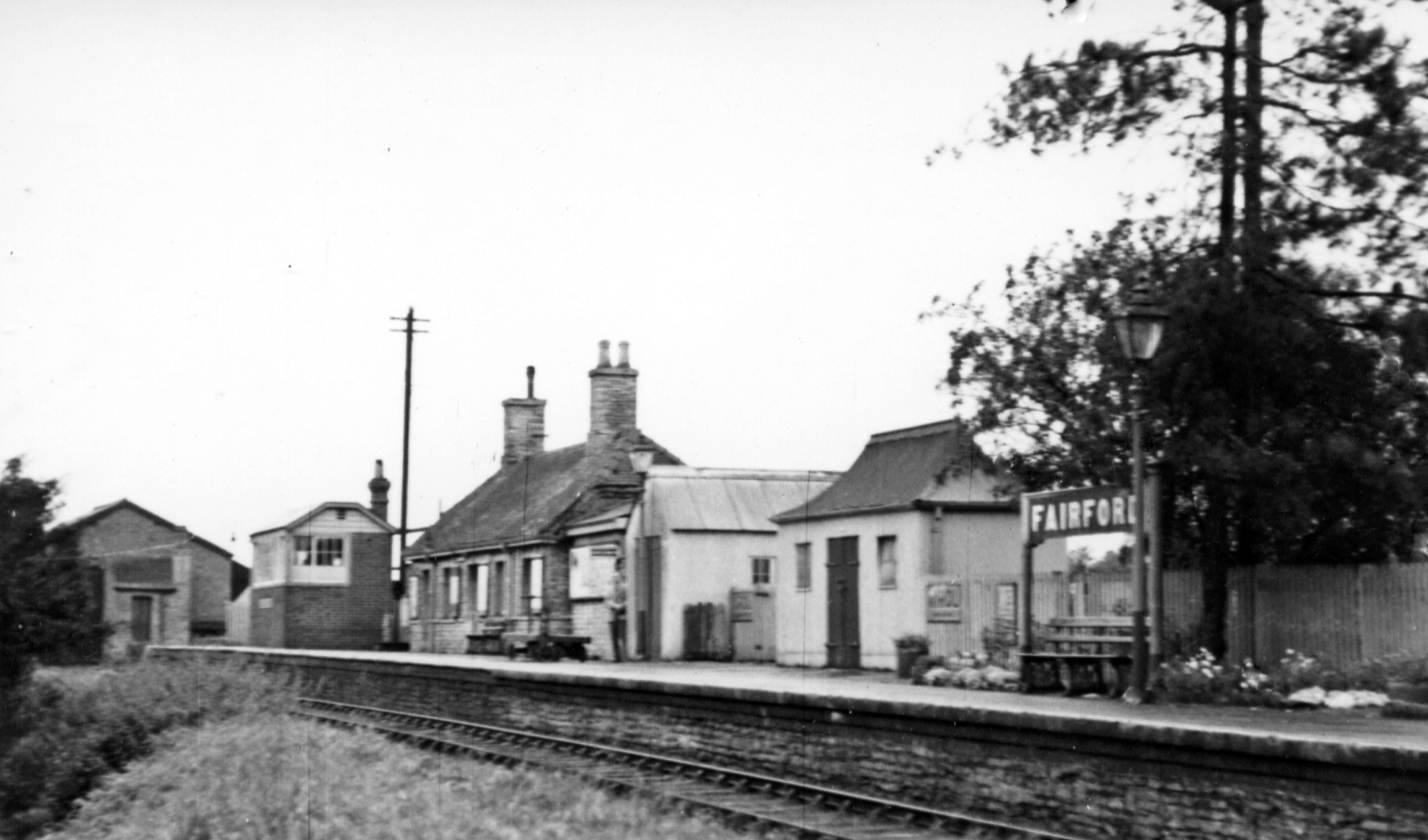
Fairford in 1950

The archetypal Pagoda Platform Shelter was a distinctively-shaped corrugated iron structure used by passengers waiting at railway stations in Wales and southern England.

== Origins ==
In Britain Pagoda shelters are associated with the Great Western Railway (GWR) who introduced them in 1907 and erected a patchwork of them across their network. They were manufactured by an outside supplier and delivered in kit form. They could therefore be assembled offsite, delivered on standard well wagons and craned into position, or assembled onsite, according to circumstances.

The GWR opened its first "Haltes" on 12 October 1903, anglicising the name to "Halt" in 1905. They were prime candidates for Pagoda shelters, but the market was crowded: finance, tradition, knowledge, skills and materials to hand meant that some lines had pagodas aplenty, some one or two and others none at all. The Bala to Ffestiniog Line in upland Wales, for example, had six halts erected at remote, virgin sites between the World Wars, Teigl Halt and Llafar Halt had pagoda shelters, but Trawsfynydd Lake Halt, Bryn-Celynog Halt, Tyddyn Bridge Halt and Capel Celyn Halt had shelters with other designs.

Opening halts and standardising cheap to install and cheap to buy infrastructure in the face of competition firstly from trams, then buses and ultimately cars overlapped with other initiatives such as the railmotor.

== Spread ==
Pagoda shelters were generally associated with branch lines, but many were erected next to regional arteries and some were erected next to main lines; Challow being an example on what was and remains a high speed route out of Paddington.

== Specifications ==
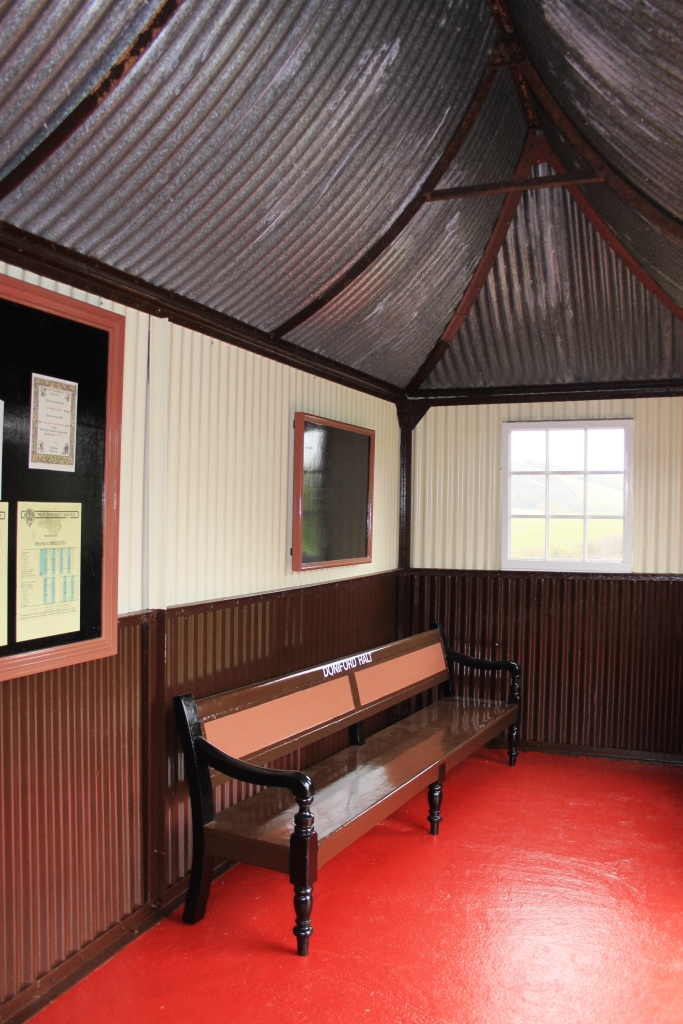
Inside the preserved example at Doniford Halt

Although they were renowned for their shape, their greatest virtues were their cost, simplicity and durability, coupled with the fact that the GWR "took them seriously". They were built to precise working drawings with materials to exact engineering specifications. The example installed at the remote Teigl Halt, for example, had a roof made of "No. 18 SWG Galvanised 3 inch Corrugated Sheeting [...] with a floor of specially prepared timber."

== Suitability ==
Many small halts used wooden platforms on a timber frame, rather than masonry or earth. The pagoda shelter could be used for these because of its light weight.

== Platform configurations ==
A pagoda shelter was typically provided for each platform, as, for example, at Truthall Halt. As the halts where they were used were mostly on single-track lines, there was only one shelter, though Bilson Halt had only one platform with two pagoda shelters. Stations such as Radipole and Ruislip Gardens with two platforms, had two, one on each platform, as did Appleford. Harlech and Loudwater had two platforms but a pagoda shelter opposite the masonry station building only. Perivale Halt had several on each platform. Defiance Halt (later Defiance Platform) had one on each platform initially, but two more were added to the Up platform during the station's life. Bala Junction had three platform faces with a pagoda shelter only on the most southerly.

== Variations ==
Most pagoda shelters were simple structures with one doorway leading into one room. At Kelmscott and Langford, however, the station building was a "Pagoda Building", with three doors and four windows facing the platform and rooms inside for different purposes. Penhelig still has a pagoda shelter which used to incorporate a "lean-to" staff cabin at the Aberdyfi end. The lean-to appears to have been incorporated into the overall building since it was de-staffed. The shelter differs from most pagodas in that it is either built of or clad with timber.

Although the standard pagoda shelter measured 20 feet (6.1 m) by 8 feet (2.4 m), they could be erected to different dimensions, occasionally at the same location, such as Dawlish Warren.

== Uses ==
The shelters were mainly used by passengers waiting for trains, but at least two - at Legacy and Tetbury - were "Pagoda lamp huts", whilst one at Witney was a shed. Fairford and Twyford each had a "Pagoda bike shed". Pagoda huts existed next to Weymouth Junction signalbox, and in Hagley station goods yard, neither was for passenger use. A Pagoda shelter was erected at right angles to the track next to the down platform at Festiniog, unsigned and painted black; research continues into its purpose. It was still there in 1989, 28 years after the station closed and long after all other buildings had been demolished.

== Other railways' pagoda shelters ==
The GWR did not have a complete monopoly of pagoda shelters; Grogley Halt, Nanstallon Halt and Dunmere Halt on the former LSWR branch near Bodmin in Cornwall had one each, and the Highland Railway had at least one, at the remote Borrobol on its main line to Wick. In the United States, pagoda shelters were adopted on a large scale by at least one railroad.

== The present ==
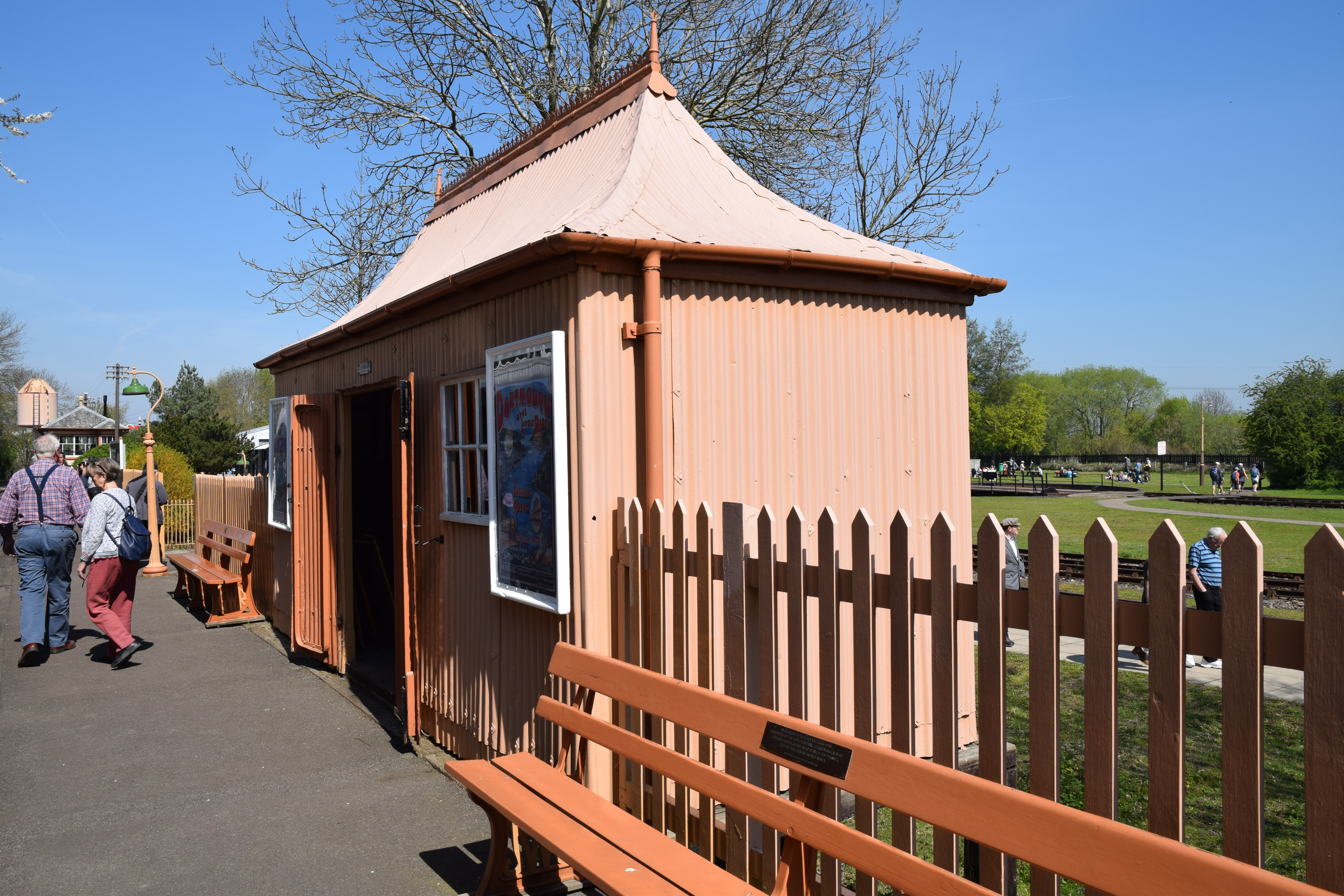
Didcot Railway Centre

By 2015 a few, such as Denham Golf Club, survived in ordinary use. Some survived on preserved railways and others have been erected as new builds on such lines At least one has been rescued from a derelict site and installed on a preserved railway, at Doniford Halt on the West Somerset Railway. The shelter and other platform furniture at Llanerch-Ayron Halt have been preserved, but not the railway.

Most, however, have been demolished, either to be replaced with a more modern structure, as at Machynlleth, or demolished along with the station, as at Llafar Halt, or obliterated along with the line and station, as at Mount Hawke and Goonhavern Halts.

== Further material ==
- Clarke, R. H., ed. (1986). An Historical Survey of Selected Great Western Stations: Vol. 2. Oxford: Oxford Publishing. ISBN 978-0-86093-015-0.
- Norris, John; Beale, Gerry; Lewis, John (1987). Edwardian Enterprise. Nottingham: Wild Swan Publications Ltd. ISBN 978-0-906867-39-6.
