= Tyddyngwyn railway station =

Former railway station in Wales

Tyddyngwyn

General information
- Location: Manod, Blaenau Ffestiniog, Gwynedd; Wales
- Coordinates: 52.9821°N 3.9317°W
- Grid reference: SH 704 445
- Platforms: 0

Other information
- Status: Disused

History
- Original company: Festiniog and Blaenau Railway

Key dates
- 30 May 1868: Opened
- 5 September 1883: Last passenger train called
- 10 September 1883: Standard gauge opened at nearby Manod
- January 1960: Passenger trains ended through the station site
- 27 January 1961: Line closed and mothballed
Location

Tyddyngwyn railway station was immediately north of the later Manod station in what was then Merionethshire, now Gwynedd, Wales.

Tyddyngwyn was an intermediate station on the 1 ft 11 3/4 in (603 mm) narrow gauge Festiniog and Blaenau Railway (F&BR); it opened with the line on 30 May 1868. The F&BR ran the three and a half route miles northwards from its southern terminus at Llan Ffestiniog to a junction with the Ffestiniog Railway (FR) at Dolgarregddu Junction near what is nowadays Blaenau Ffestiniog station.

The station was a passenger station, whose main but not sole traffic was quarrymen travelling to and from work

In common with all other F&BR stations there were no platforms, carriages were very low to the ground, so passengers boarded from and alighted to the trackside. The station had a single-storey building on the eastern side of the track. No details of the station's facilities have been published, though the standard work conjectures there may have been a siding. In common with Festiniog and Tan-y-Manod stations, the only published photographs were taken from a distance, they lend the buildings the appearance of corrugated iron. The sole close-up photo is of the line's northern terminus - Duffws (F&BR). This shows the building to bear a striking resemblance to weatherboarding. If the line's other stations were made of the same material that would explain their corrugated mien.

== Services ==
The February 1878 narrow gauge timetable shows that all trains called at all stations on the line, with

- Northbound ("Up")
  - four public trains running Monday to Saturday
  - an unadvertised morning workmen's train running Monday to Saturday
  - two public evening trains on Saturdays only
    - The journey time from Tyddyngwyn to Diphwys(F&BR) was 10 minutes.
- Southbound ("Down")
  - four public trains running Monday to Saturday
  - a morning workmen's train running Monday to Saturday
  - two public evening trains on Saturdays only
  - a teatime workmen's train on Saturdays only
    - The journey time from Diphwys (F&BR) to Tyddyngwyn was 6 minutes.
- There was no Sunday service.

Diphwys was the F&BR's Blaenau station and would become the site of the town's later GWR station, but it was not the Festiniog Railway's Duffws (FR) station. Through passengers from Tyddyngwyn to Porthmadog Harbour would alight at the F&BR's Diphwys station and walk across Church Street in Blaenau to the Festiniog Railway's completely separate Duffws station. Most trains were timetabled to make this process workable, if tight. Whether connecting trains were held in the case of late running is not recorded.

In the line's early days trains many trains ran "mixed", but this was stopped in 1877. Unlike most railways in the area passengers were the line's mainstay. In 1879 - a typical year - passenger receipts were £1406 compared with £416 for goods. No figures have been published specifically for Tyddyngwyn.

== The standard gauge approaches ==
On 1 September 1882 the standard gauge Bala and Festiniog Railway reached Llan Ffestiniog from the south, enabling a passenger from (say) Bala to Tyddyngwyn to transfer from a standard gauge train to a narrow gauge train at Llan by walking a few yards, much as modern-day passengers transfer between Conwy Valley Line and Ffestiniog Railway trains at Blaenau Ffestiniog.

From May 1882 the narrow gauge line was converted to standard gauge. Narrow gauge trains continued to operate during the conversion, using a third rail. Narrow gauge trains ceased running on 5 September 1883 with standard gauge services beginning on 10 September 1883. Tyddyngwyn was closed permanently when the narrow gauge ended, being replaced by Manod a few yards to the south when standard gauge services began.

Tyddyngwyn's station building appears to have resembled that at Tan-y-Manod, but no details of its facilities have been published. It was demolished after closure, leaving no trace.

== The line reopened ==
The line through the site of Tyddyngwyn station closed in 1961 but it was mothballed pending building the long-discussed cross-town link to enable trains to run along the Conwy Valley Line, through Blaenau and on to Trawsfynydd nuclear power station which was then being built. The line through the site reopened on 24 April 1964, but none of Tyddyngwyn's or Manod's facilities were brought back to life. The line closed again in 1998 as the nuclear plant was being decommissioned. Once more the route was mothballed in case a future use is found.

== The station site in the 21st century ==
By 2011 the whole site had been completely demolished. In Spring 2016 the mothballed single track line still ran past the site to the former nuclear flask loading point. Tyddyngwyn Terrace, Manod lies northeast of the station site. The bridge visible beyond the station in the photograph reproduced by Boyd was still in place in 2015 at the western end of Arwain l; it would have afforded a grandstand view of the station.

== The future ==
Between 2000 and 2011 there were at least two attempts to put the mothballed line through the site to use. In 2011 there were proposals to use the rails as a recreational velorail track. Neither this nor the earlier idea came to anything. The possibility remains that the surviving line could see future preservation or reuse by the nuclear industry.

To considerable local surprise fresh moves to reopen the line from Blaenau as far south as Trawsfynydd began in September 2016, with the formation of The Trawsfynydd & Blaenau Ffestiniog Community Railway Company. On 21 September at least one regional newspaper reported that "Volunteers are set to start work this weekend on clearing vegetation from the trackbed between Blaenau Ffestiniog and Trawsfynydd." The company was quoted as saying "We have been given a licence by Network Rail to clear and survey the line."

Preceding station	Disused railways	Following station
Tan-y-Manod; Line and station closed	Festiniog and Blaenau Railway; Narrow gauge	Festiniog; Line and station closed

== Further material ==
- Boyd, James I.C. (October 1959). Mansell, K.G. (ed.). "Bala & Festiniog Section - W.R.". Railway World. 20 (233). London: Railway World Limited.
- Christiansen, Rex (1976). Forgotten Railways: North and Mid Wales. Newton Abbot, Devon: David and Charles. ISBN 0-7153-7059-6.
- Coleford, I. C. (October 2010). Smith, Martin (ed.). "By GWR to Blaenau Ffestiniog (Part One)". Railway Bylines. 15 (11). Radstock: Irwell Press Limited.
- Coleford, I. C. (November 2010). Smith, Martin (ed.). "By GWR to Blaenau Ffestiniog (Part Two)". Railway Bylines. 15 (12). Radstock: Irwell Press Limited.
- Ferris, Tom (2004) [1961]. British Railways Volume 4 - Bewdley To Blaenau (DVD). demanddvd. DEMDVD084.
- Green, C.C. (1996) [1983]. North Wales Branch Line Album. Shepperton: Ian Allan Publishing. ISBN 0-7110-1252-0.
- Mitchell, Vic; Smith, Keith (2010). Bala to Llandudno: Featuring Blaenau Ffestiniog. Midhurst, West Sussex: Middleton Press (MD). ISBN 978-1-906008-87-1.
- Morton Lloyd, M.E. (April 1961). Cooke, B.W.C. (ed.). "Farewell to Bala-Blaenau Branch". The Railway Magazine. 107 (720). London: Tothill Press Limited.
- Richards, Alun John (2001). The Slate Railways of Wales. Llanrwst: Gwasg Carreg Gwalch. ISBN 0-86381-689-4.
- Southern, D. W. (1995). Bala Junction to Blaenau Ffestiniog (Scenes from the Past, Railways of North Wales, No. 25). Stockport: Foxline Publishing. ISBN 1-8701-19-34-7.
- Turner, Alun (2003). Gwynedd's Lost Railways. Catrine, Ayrshire: Stenlake Publishing. ISBN 9781840332599.
