= Gellilydan =

Coordinates: 52.939°N 3.959°W

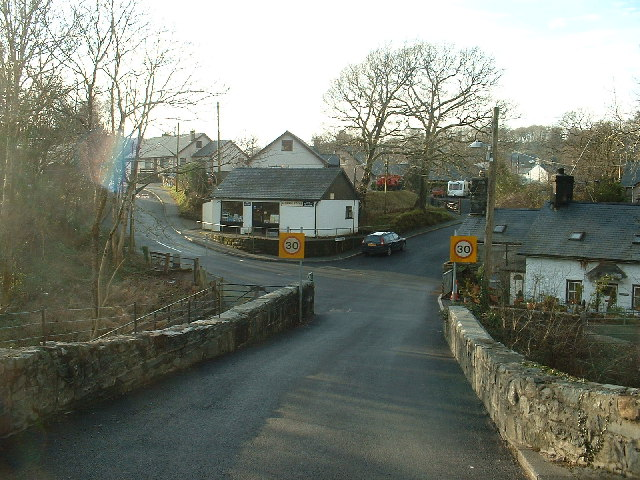
- Gellilydan

- Location within Gwynedd
- Population: 631 (2011)
- OS grid reference: SH683397
  - Cardiff: 106 mi (171 km)
- Community: Maentwrog
- Principal area: Gwynedd
- Preserved county: Gwynedd
- Country: Wales
- Sovereign state: United Kingdom
- Post town: BLAENAU FFESTINIOG
- Postcode district: LL41
- Dialling code: 01766
- Police: North Wales
- Fire: North Wales
- Ambulance: Welsh
- UK Parliament: Dwyfor Meirionnydd
- Senedd Cymru – Welsh Parliament: Dwyfor Meirionnydd

Gellilydan (Welsh pronunciation) is a village in the Welsh county of Gwynedd, in Maentwrog community. It lies 4 miles (6 km) south-south-east of Blaenau Ffestiniog and 1.2 miles (2 km) north of Llyn Trawsfynydd and the disused Trawsfynydd nuclear power station. It is near the junction of two trunk roads, the A487 and the A470.

The local pub is the Bryn Arms which was built by two brothers who named the pub after their father.

The Roman Catholic Church of The Holy Cross was opened in 1952. The Catholic community in the area resulted from Irish workers on the construction of the Llyn Trawsfynydd reservoir in the 1920s, which supplied the Maentwrog hydroelectric power station. The church is a Grade II listed building and was formerly a tannery built in late eighteenth century. There are artworks in the church by the sculptor Jonah Jones. Saint John Roberts (1577–1610) was one of the Forty Martyrs of England and Wales and was born within the current parish. One of his fingers is kept as a relic in the church, and a bi-annual mass for him is held in there.

Gellilydan was 1 km (0.6 mi) west of Maentwrog Road railway station, which opened in 1882 on the Bala and Festiniog Railway. It closed in 1960.

Pont Tafarn-helyg carries the A487 road over the Afon Tafarn-helyg. It is a stone bridge that was probably built in the mid-nineteenth century, and is Grade II listed.

== Education ==
Ysgol Edmwnd Prys provides Welsh-medium primary education to the village and the surrounding area. As of 2024, there are 23 pupils enrolled at the school. 71.4 per cent of statutory school age pupils speak Welsh at home.
