= Spent nuclear fuel storage =

Spent nuclear fuel storage can refer to:

- Dry cask storage, a method of storing high-level radioactive waste that has already been cooled
- Spent fuel pool

== See also ==
- Nuclear fuel cycle
- Spent nuclear fuel
- Nuclear flask
