= Cwm Prysor Viaduct =

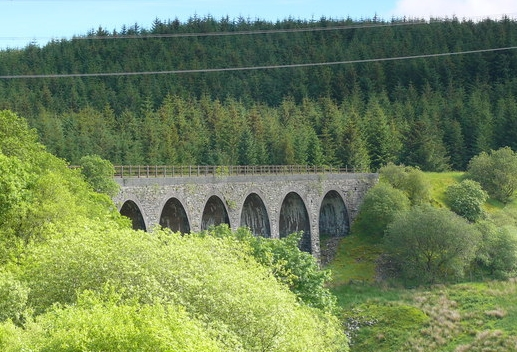
- Cwm Prysor Viaduct in 2014
- Coordinates: 52.9323°N 3.8235°W
- Carries: Ex-Bala and Festiniog Railway
- Crosses: Afon Prysor
- Locale: Cwm Prysor, east of Trawsfynydd, Gwynedd, Wales
- Official name: Cwm Prysor Viaduct

Characteristics
- Design: 9 36 feet (11 m) brick arches on stone piers
- Total length: 490 feet (150 m)
- Width: Single Standard Gauge Rail
- Height: 105 feet (32 m)

History
- Opened: 1 November 1882
- Closed: 28 January 1961

Statistics
- Daily traffic: Footpath

Location
- Interactive map of Cwm Prysor Viaduct

Cwm Prysor Viaduct, which is occasionally referred to as Blaen-y-Cwm Viaduct, is a railway viaduct which crosses the Afon Prysor in thinly populated uplands east of Trawsfynydd, Gwynedd, Wales. It was built by the Bala and Festiniog Railway. It carried a single track on a line that ran between Bala Junction and Blaenau Ffestiniog. The line it was built for went out of service in 1961.

== History ==
The structure consists of nine stone arches carrying a single bi-directional track over which passenger trains ran from 1882 to 1960, with freight trains lasting until 1961. The viaduct was the most substantial single structure on the line. It is sharply curved, necessitating the provision of a check rail in its active railway days.

In 1953 extensive repair work was undertaken in which the opportunity was taken to raise the parapet and add metal railings on top.

A "Last Train" special crossed the viaduct a week before final closure. The track was lifted in the 1960s.

The prospect of rail traffic returning over the viaduct is very remote, not least because part of the route has been flooded by the construction of a dam at Llyn Celyn.

== Modern access ==
The structure is Grade II Listed. The landowner allows public access but there is no public right of way.

== Further material ==
- Ferris, Tom (2004) [1961]. British Railways Volume 4 - Bewdley To Blaenau (DVD). demanddvd. DEMDVD084.
- Turner, Alun (2003). Gwynedd's Lost Railways. Catrine: Stenlake Publishing. ISBN 978-1-84033-259-9.
