= Maentwrog Road railway station =

Disused railway station in Gwynedd, Wales

Maentwrog Road
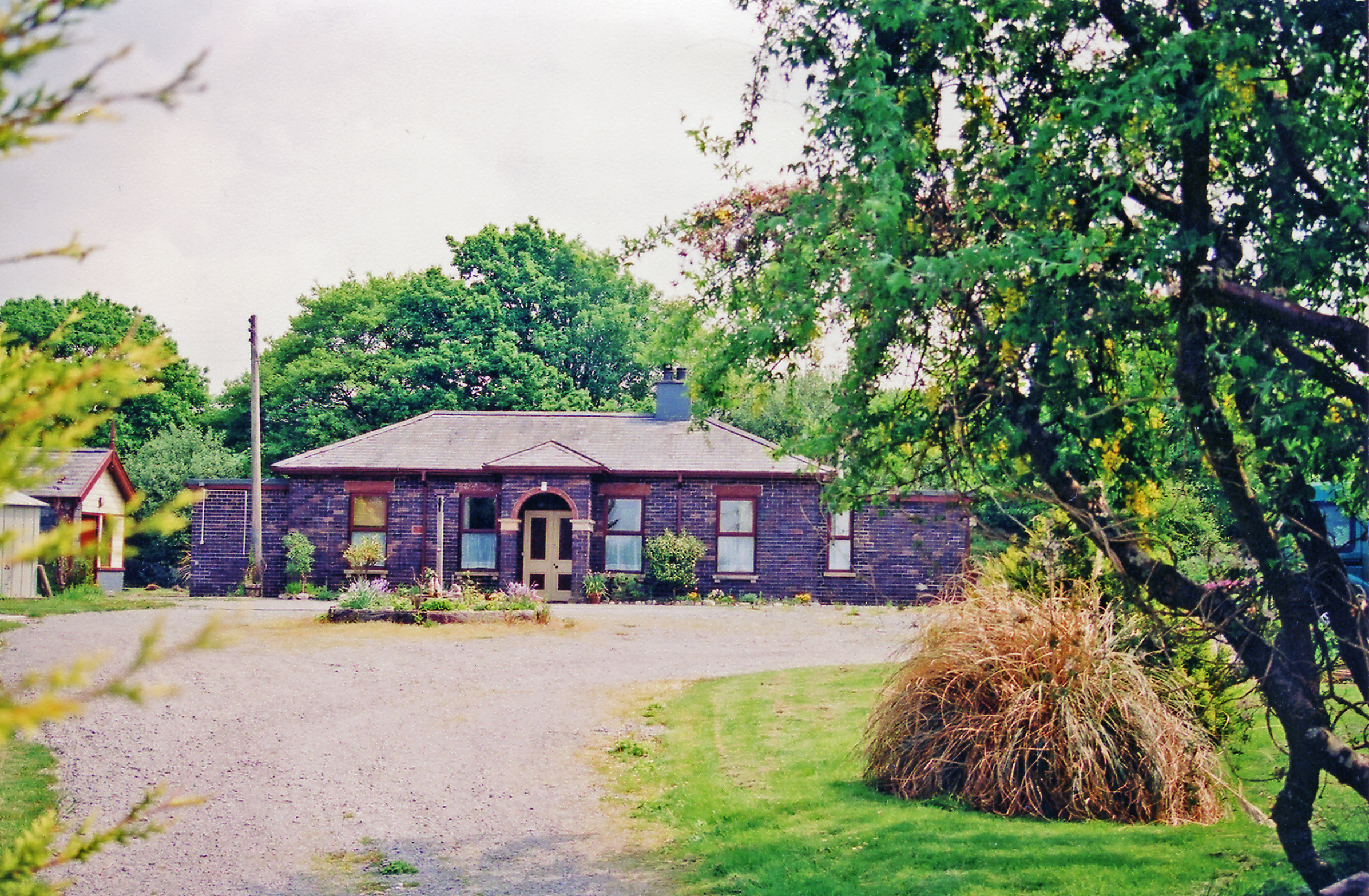
- Remains of the station in 2001

General information
- Location: Gellilydan, Gwynedd; Wales
- Coordinates: 52.9401°N 3.9446°W
- Grid reference: SH 694 398
- Platforms: 1

Other information
- Status: Disused

History
- Original company: Bala and Festiniog Railway
- Pre-grouping: Great Western Railway

Key dates
- 1 November 1882: Opened
- 4 January 1960: Closed for passengers
- 27 January 1961: Closed completely
- 21 May 1989: Reopened for Sunday tourist service
- 10 September 1989: Closed once more
- 17 October 1998: Line closed and mothballed
Location

Maentwrog Road railway station was on the Great Western Railway's Bala Ffestiniog Line in Gwynedd, Wales.

== History ==
The station opened in 1882 when the line opened from Bala Junction as far north as Festiniog where passengers could change to narrow gauge trains to continue to Blaenau Ffestiniog. The narrow gauge was replaced by standard gauge over the following twelve months, after which point through travel north of Festiniog became possible. The station closed to passengers in January 1960 and freight a year later. The use of "Road" in a station's name was a GWR euphemism for "not near the settlement in the station's name"; the station is a good two hilly miles from the village of Maentwrog.

== Services ==
The September 1959 timetable shows

- Northbound
  - three trains calling at all stations from Bala to Blaenau on Monday to Saturday
  - an extra evening train calling at all stations from Bala to Blaenau on Saturday
  - a Monday to Friday train calling at all stations from Bala to Trawsfynydd
    - The journey time from Bala to Maentwrog Road was around 58 minutes.
- Southbound
  - three trains calling at all stations from Blaenau to Bala on Monday to Saturday
  - two extra trains calling at all stations from Blaenau to Bala on Saturday
  - an extra train calling at all stations from Blaenau to Trawsfynydd on Saturday evening
  - a Monday to Friday train calling at all stations from Blaenau to Bala, except Llafar, Bryn-celynog and Cwm Prysor Halts
    - The journey time from Blaenau to Maentwrog Road was around 20 minutes.
- There was no Sunday service.

After the Second World War at the latest most trains were composed of two carriages, with one regular turn comprising just one brake third coach. At least one train along the line regularly ran as a mixed train, with a second between Bala and Arenig. By that time such trains had become rare on Britain's railways. Workmen's trains had been a feature of the line from the outset; they were the Festiniog and Blaenau Railway's biggest source of revenue. Such a service between Trawsfynydd and Blaenau Ffestiniog survived to the line's closure to passengers in 1960. Up to 1930 at the earliest such services used dedicated, lower standard, coaches which used a specific siding at Blaenau where the men boarded from and alighted to the ballast.

For many years a tannery at nearby Gellilydan provided the station with a regular goods traffic. The tannery was later converted to a Roman Catholic church.

The line from Bala north to Trawsfynydd was designated in the restrictive "Blue" weight limit, with the section from Trawsfynydd to Blaenau limited even more tightly to "Yellow". The literature conjectures on overweight classes being used on troop trains, but no solid claim or photograph has been published. Only two steam age photos of the line show anything other than an 0-4-2 or 0-6-0 tank engine, they being of GWR 2251 Class 0-6-0s taken in the 1940s. As the 1950s passed "5700" and "7400" 0-6-PTs stole the show, exemplified by 9610 at Festiniog in the 1950s. 0-4-2T engines "..suffer[ed] from limited tank capacity and power."

== Closure and reopening ==
By the 1950s the line was deemed unremunerative. A survey undertaken in 1956 and 1957 found that the average daily numbers of passengers boarding and alighting were:

- Blaenau Ffestiniog Central 62 and 65
- Manod Halt 7 and 4
- Teigl Halt 5 and 5
- Festiniog 28 and 26
- Maentwrog Road 8 and 6
- Trawsfynydd Lake Halt 1 and 1
- Trawsfynydd 28 and 24
- Llafar Halt 2 and 2
- Bryn-celynog Halt 2 and 2
- Cwm Prysor Halt 3 and 3
- Arenig 5 and 5
- Capel Celyn Halt 7 and 8
- Tyddyn Bridge Halt 4 and 6
- Frongoch 18 and 15
- Bala 65 and 58

Military traffic had ended and, apart from a finite contract to bring cement to Blaenau in connection with the construction of Ffestiniog Power Station freight traffic was not heavy, most arriving and leaving Bala did so from and to the south and that to Blaenau could be handled from the Conwy Valley Line northwards.

In 1957 Parliament authorised Liverpool Corporation to flood a section of the line by damming the Afon Tryweryn. Monies were made available to divert the route round the dam, but it was decided that improving the Bala to Llan Ffestiniog Road would be of greater benefit. Road transport alternatives were established for groups such as schoolchildren and workers. The plans afoot for rail serving Trawsfynydd nuclear power station were to be catered for by building the long-discussed cross-town link between the two Blaenau standard gauge stations. The estimated financial savings to be made were £23,300 by withdrawing the passenger service and £7000 in renewal charges.

The station closed to passengers in January 1960 and to freight a year later. In 1964 the line reopened from Blaenau southwards through the station site to a siding near the site of Trawsfynydd Lake Halt where a large ("Goliath") gantry was erected to load and unload traffic for the then new Trawsfynydd nuclear power station. The main goods transported were nuclear fuel rods carried in nuclear flasks.

During the 1980s a siding was constructed in the former goods yard at Maentwrog Road serving the explosives factory in Penrhyndeudraeth. This was necessary as locomotive hauled trains had been banned from the usual route along the Cambrian Line owing to concerns regarding the structural condition of Barmouth Bridge.

Passenger trains briefly returned to the station in 1989, using a temporary platform in the old goods yard. These trains ran for one summer in an attempt to encourage tourism at the power station. Few people used the service to visit the power station, most riders travelled "for the ride", so the following year tourist trains drove to the line's terminus then reversed, with no-one getting on or off.

Rail enthusiasts' special trains traversed the line from time to time. Notable examples were two "last trains". The first ran from Bala to Blaenau Ffestiniog and return on 22 January 1961 and in the post-1964 era the "Trawsfynydd Lament" ran southwards to the limit of line at the power station loading point on 17 October 1998, the line having become redundant following removal of nuclear material from the power station.

== The station in the 21st century ==
The station building and adjacent stationmaster's house have been in use as private residences for many years.

In 2002 the A470 bridge at the north end of the station was rebuilt, preserving the integrity of the railway line.

== The future ==
Between 2000 and 2011 there were at least two attempts to put the remaining line to use. In 2011 there were proposals to use the rails as a recreational velorail track. Neither this nor the earlier idea came to anything. The possibility remains that the surviving line could see future preservation or reuse by the nuclear industry.

To considerable local surprise fresh moves to reopen the line from Blaenau as far south as Trawsfynydd began in September 2016, with the formation of The Trawsfynydd & Blaenau Ffestiniog Community Railway Company. On 21 September at least one regional newspaper reported that "Volunteers are set to start work this weekend on clearing vegetation from the trackbed between Blaenau Ffestiniog and Trawsfynydd." The company was quoted as saying "We have been given a licence by Network Rail to clear and survey the line." By mid-October 2016 the company had achieved six working days of track clearance. After the society's meeting on 28 January 2017 they were given the go ahead to start on stage two of the project and to create a base to work from at Maentwrog Road. One week later, on Saturday 4 February 2017, work started clearing the site at Maentwrog Road with a plant hire company from Crewe offering its time to clear the track with its fleet of mini diggers.

Preceding station	Disused railways	Following station
Festiniog; Line mothballed, station closed	Great Western Railway; Bala and Festiniog Railway	Trawsfynydd Lake Halt; Line mothballed, station closed

== Further material ==
- Baughan, Peter E. (1980). A Regional History of the Railways of Great Britain: Volume 11 North and Mid Wales (1st ed.). Newton Abbot: David & Charles. ISBN 978-0-7153-7850-2. OCLC 6823219.
- Ferris, Tom (2004) [1961]. British Railways Volume 4 - Bewdley To Blaenau (DVD). demanddvd. DEMDVD084.
- Turner, Alun (2003). Gwynedd's Lost Railways. Catrine, Ayrshire: Stenlake Publishing. ISBN 978-1-84033-259-9.
