= Trawsfynydd Lake Halt railway station =

Disused railway station in Gwynedd, Wales

Trawsfynydd Lake Halt

General information
- Location: North east of Llyn Trawsfynydd, Gwynedd; Wales
- Coordinates: 52.9279°N 3.9368°W
- Grid reference: SH 699 384
- Platforms: 1

Other information
- Status: Disused

History
- Original company: Great Western Railway

Key dates
- 14 April 1934: Opened for passengers only
- 4 January 1960: Closed, but line remained open for goods
- 28 January 1961: Line closed
- 10 April 1964: Line reopened from the north, but not the halt
- 17 October 1998: Line closed and mothballed
Location

Trawsfynydd Lake Halt was a solely passenger railway station near the northeastern tip of Llyn Trawsfynydd, Gwynedd, Wales. Many Nineteenth and early Twentieth Century institutions in Wales were given anglicised names, this station being one. Over the years, and especially since the Second World War, most have been rendered into Welsh or given both Welsh and English names. Trawsfynydd Lake Halt closed before this happened.

== Origins ==
The line through the site of the future halt was opened in 1882 by the Bala and Festiniog Railway The company and line were subsequently taken over by the Great Western Railway (GWR) which went on to open the halt in 1934. Trawsfynydd Lake Halt was one of the 198 opened by the Great Western Railway (GWR) between 1927 and 1939, in this case in pursuit of leisure business, in particular angling and walking, though the few locals on this upland rural area also made use of it.

Llyn Trawsfynydd is man made. It opened in 1928 as part of a hydro-electric power scheme. "Reservoir Siding" was opened by the GWR in 1925 to serve firms building the dam and hydro power station; It diverged towards the lake just north of the site of the future halt. This remained open but little used after the scheme opened. When the halt was opened the siding ended behind its waiting shelter. The siding would go on to have a future undreamed of even for those behind the original hydroelectric venture.

== Neighbouring railways ==
Three railways were planned or ran near the halt, but none was connected to it or the line through it.

The best documented was the narrow gauge Merionethshire Railway, but it was never built. Arguably it was never expected to be built, but was devised as a threat to vested interests, notably the Festiniog Railway. Its planned route would have deviated west near the later site of Trawsfynydd Lake Halt and crossed rugged country to join the Cambrian Railways near Talsarnau. The threat therein was to give an alternative way for slates to be taken from Blaenau to the wider British market.

The second line was a 3 feet (910 mm) gauge contractors' railway used as part of building Maentwrog's (Trawsfynydd's) first dam in the 1920s. The line had six locomotives, including a Hudswell Clarke 0-4-0ST No.34. That dam created the basis for the artificial lake which provided headwater for the Maentwrog hydro-electric scheme which still provided electricity in early 2016. Public awareness of this scheme has tended to be swamped by the Trawsfynydd nuclear power station which has come and gone during the hydro-electric scheme's lifetime.

The third line was a 2 feet (610 mm) gauge contractors' railway used when the dam was enlarged and the lake expanded between 1954 and 1956 in preparation for building the nuclear power station. Trains were hauled by four Ruston Hornsby diesel locomotives.

== Description ==
The unstaffed halt's single platform's edge was made of sleepers, the platform itself being infilled with ash and cinders. It was a mere 50 feet (15 m) long, drivers had instructions to stop so that the guard's compartment was alongside. The amenities provided were a platform shelter and an oil lamp, with access by a footpath.

The September 1959 timetable shows

- Northbound
  - three trains calling at all stations from Bala to Blaenau on Monday to Saturday
  - an extra evening train calling at all stations from Bala to Blaenau on Saturday
  - a Monday to Friday train calling at all stations from Bala to Trawsfynydd
    - The journey time from Bala to the halt was around 55 minutes.
- Southbound
  - three trains calling at all stations from Blaenau to Bala on Monday to Saturday
  - two extra trains calling at all stations from Blaenau to Bala on Saturday
  - an extra train calling at all stations from Blaenau to Trawsfynydd on Saturday evening
  - a Monday to Friday train calling at all stations from Blaenau to Bala, except Llafar, Bryn-celynog and Cwm Prysor Halts
    - The journey time from Blaenau to the halt was around 25 minutes.
- There was no Sunday service.

In 1935 the Ministry of Transport stated that the halt was used by 20 passengers per week.

After the Second World War at the latest most trains were composed of two carriages, with one regular turn comprising just one brake third coach. At least one train along the line regularly ran as a mixed train, with a second between Bala and Arenig. By that time such trains had become rare on Britain's railways. Workmen's trains had been a feature of the line from the outset; they were the Festiniog and Blaenau Railway's biggest source of revenue. Such a service between Trawsfynydd and Blaenau Ffestiniog survived to the line's closure to passengers in 1960. Up to 1930 at the earliest such services used dedicated, lower standard, coaches which used a specific siding at Blaenau where the men boarded from and alighted to the ballast.

The line from Bala north to Trawsfynydd was designated in the restrictive "Blue" weight limit, with the section from Trawsfynydd to Blaenau limited even more tightly to "Yellow". The literature conjectures on overweight classes being used on troop trains, but no solid claim or photograph has been published. Only two steam age photos of the line show anything other than an 0-4-2 or 0-6-0 tank engine, they being of GWR 2251 Class 0-6-0s taken in the 1940s. As the 1950s passed "5700" and "7400" 0-6-PTs stole the show, exemplified by 9610 at Festiniog in the 1950s. 0-4-2T engines "..suffer[ed] from limited tank capacity and power."

== Closure ==
By the 1950s the line was deemed unremunerative. A survey undertaken in 1956 and 1957 found that the average daily numbers of passengers boarding and alighting were:

- Blaenau Ffestiniog Central 62 and 65
- Manod Halt 7 and 4
- Teigl Halt 5 and 5
- Festiniog 28 and 26
- Maentwrog Road 8 and 6
- Trawsfynydd Lake Halt 1 and 1
- Trawsfynydd 28 and 24
- Llafar Halt 2 and 2
- Bryn-celynog Halt 2 and 2
- Cwm Prysor Halt 3 and 3
- Arenig 5 and 5
- Capel Celyn Halt 7 and 8
- Tyddyn Bridge Halt 4 and 6
- Frongoch 18 and 15
- Bala 65 and 58

Military traffic had ended and, apart from a finite contract to bring cement to Blaenau in connection with the construction of Ffestiniog Power Station freight traffic was not heavy, most arriving and leaving Bala did so from and to the south and that to Blaenau could be handled from the Conwy Valley Line northwards.

In 1957 Parliament authorised Liverpool Corporation to flood a section of the line by damming the Afon Tryweryn. Monies were made available to divert the route round the dam, but it was decided that improving the road from Bala to Llan Ffestiniog would be of greater benefit. Road transport alternatives were established for groups such as schoolchildren and workers. The plans afoot for rail serving Trawsfynydd nuclear power station were to be catered for by building the long-discussed cross-town link between the two Blaenau standard gauge stations. The estimated financial savings to be made were £23,300 by withdrawing the passenger service and £7000 in renewal charges.

The halt closed in January 1960 but freight trains continued to pass the site for a further year. In 1964 the line reopened from Blaenau Ffestiniog southwards to Reservoir Siding, where a large ("Goliath") gantry was erected to load and unload traffic for the then new Trawsfynydd nuclear power station. The main goods transported were nuclear fuel rods carried in nuclear flasks. The line from the junction with Reservoir Siding to the halt was left in place for shunting purposes, though the halt itself was not used in any way.

== Legacy ==
Passenger trains briefly returned to the line in 1989 to a temporary platform at Maentwrog Road. These trains ran for one summer in an attempt to encourage tourism at the power station. Few people used the service to visit the power station, most riders travelled "for the ride", so the following year tourist trains drove to the line's terminus near the remnants of Trawsfynydd Lake Halt then reversed, with no-one getting on or off. This service lasted until the end of the 1990 Summer season.

Rail enthusiasts' special trains traversed the line from time to time. Notable examples were two "last trains". The first ran from Bala to Blaenau Ffestiniog and return on 22 January 1961 and in the post-1964 era the "Trawsfynydd Lament" ran southwards to the limit of line at the power station loading point on 17 October 1998, the line having become redundant following removal of nuclear material from the power station.

By 2015 the only evidence that the halt ever existed was the decaying platform buried deep under foliage, although in Spring 2016 the mothballed line still ran to the site and to the former nuclear flask loading point. In late July 2017 Trawsfynydd & Blaenau Ffestiniog Community Railway Company volunteers uncovered the decaying platform and began clearing the surrounding vegetation.

== Preservation ==
Between 2000 and 2011 there were at least two attempts to put the remaining line to use. In 2011 there were proposals to use the rails as a recreational velorail track. Neither this nor the earlier idea came to anything. The possibility remains that the surviving line could see future preservation or reuse by the nuclear industry.

To considerable local surprise fresh moves to reopen the line from Blaenau as far south as Trawsfynydd began in September 2016, with the formation of The Trawsfynydd & Blaenau Ffestiniog Community Railway Company. On 21 September at least one regional newspaper reported that "Volunteers are set to start work this weekend on clearing vegetation from the trackbed between Blaenau Ffestiniog and Trawsfynydd." The company was quoted as saying "We have been given a licence by Network Rail to clear and survey the line." By mid-October 2016 the company had achieved six working days of track clearance.

Preceding station	Disused railways	Following station
Maentwrog Road; Line mothballed, station closed	Great Western Railway; Bala and Festiniog Railway	Trawsfynydd Camp; Line and station closed

== Notes ==
Bibliography

- Boyd, James I.C. (October 1959). Mansell, K.G. (ed.). "Bala & Festiniog Section - W.R.". Railway World. 20 (233). London: Railway World Limited.
- Boyd, James I.C. (1988) [1972]. Narrow Gauge Railways in South Caernarvonshire – Volume 1. Headington: The Oakwood Press. ISBN 978-0-85361-365-7. OCLC 20417464.
- Butt, R. V. J. (October 1995). The Directory of Railway Stations: details every public and private passenger station, halt, platform and stopping place, past and present (1st ed.). Sparkford: Patrick Stephens Ltd. ISBN 978-1-85260-508-7. OCLC 60251199. OL 11956311M.
- Christiansen, Rex (1976). Forgotten Railways: North and Mid Wales. Newton Abbot: David and Charles. ISBN 978-0-7153-7059-9.
- Clemens, Jim (2014) [1959]. Steam to North Wales (DVD). Uffington, Shropshire: B&R Video Productions. Vol 136.
- Coleford, I. C. (October 2010a). Smith, Martin (ed.). "By GWR to Blaenau Ffestiniog (Part One)". Railway Bylines. 15 (11). Radstock: Irwell Press Limited.
- Coleford, I. C. (November 2010b). Smith, Martin (ed.). "By GWR to Blaenau Ffestiniog (Part Two)". Railway Bylines. 15 (12). Radstock: Irwell Press Limited.
- Crump, Eryl (21 September 2016). "Back on Track. Dream of reopening railway moves step closer". Daily Post. Wales.
- Green, C.C. (1996) [1983]. North Wales Branch Line Album. Shepperton: Ian Allan Publishing. ISBN 978-0-7110-1252-3.
- Johnson, Peter (1995). North Wales (Celebration of Steam). Shepperton: Ian Allan Publishing. ISBN 978-0-7110-2378-9.
- Jowett, Alan (2000). Jowett's Nationalised Railway Atlas (1st ed.). Penryn, Cornwall: Atlantic Transport Publishers. ISBN 978-0-906899-99-1. OCLC 228266687.
- Mitchell, Vic; Smith, Keith (2010). Bala to Llandudno: Featuring Blaenau Ffestiniog. Midhurst: Middleton Press (MD). ISBN 978-1-906008-87-1.
- Morton Lloyd, M.E. (April 1961). Cooke, B.W.C. (ed.). "Farewell to Bala-Blaenau Branch". The Railway Magazine. 107 (720). London: Tothill Press Limited. ISSN 0033-8923.
- Pagnamenta, Robin (23 May 2016). "Rivals line up to build small nuclear plants in Snowdonia". The Times. London.
- Quick, Michael (2009) [2001]. Railway passenger stations in Great Britain: a chronology (4th ed.). Oxford: Railway & Canal Historical Society. ISBN 978-0-901461-57-5. OCLC 612226077.
- Southern, D. W. (1995). Bala Junction to Blaenau Ffestiniog. Stockport: Foxline Publishing. ISBN 978-1-870119-34-4. Scenes from the Past, Railways of North Wales, No. 25.
- Southern, D. W.; Leadbetter, H.J.; Weatherley, S.A. (1987). Rails to Bala. Rhuddlan: Charter Publications. ISBN 978-0-907157-03-8.
- Turner, Alun (2003). Gwynedd's Lost Railways. Catrine: Stenlake Publishing. ISBN 978-1-84033-259-9.
- Wells, Jeffrey (June 2016). Blakemore, Michael (ed.). "The Opening of Railway Halts 1930-1935". Back Track. 30 (6). Easingwold: Pendragon Publishing.
- Williams, Martin F.; Lowe, Derek J. (2018). The Bala Branch. Lydney: Lightmoor Press. ISBN 978-1-91103-847-4.
