= Catrine =

Village in East Ayrshire, Scotland

Coordinates: 55.50095°N 4.33672°W

Catrine: Scottish Gaelic: Ceiteirein; Scots: Cawturn
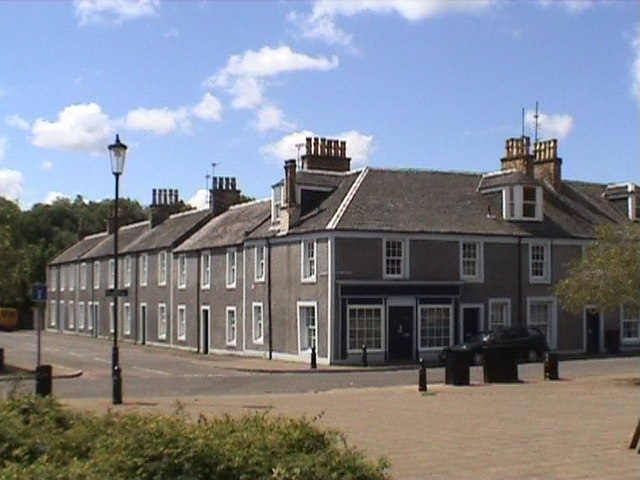
- Mill Square and Bridge Street

- Location within East Ayrshire
- Population: 2,020 (2020)
- Council area: East Ayrshire
- Lieutenancy area: Ayrshire and Arran
- Country: Scotland
- Sovereign state: United Kingdom
- Post town: MAUCHLINE
- Postcode district: KA5
- Dialling code: 01290
- Police: Scotland
- Fire: Scottish
- Ambulance: Scottish
- UK Parliament: Kilmarnock and Loudoun
- Scottish Parliament: Carrick, Cumnock and Doon Valley

Catrine is a village in East Ayrshire, Scotland, which was formerly a centre of cotton manufacture. The village is located close to the settlements of Sorn and Mauchline, and had a population of around 2,020 in 2020.

== History ==
=== Establishment ===
Catrine lies at the edge one of the longest-lasting Gaelic-speaking areas in the Lowlands of Scotland. The original Gaelic name of the village appears to be based on the root 'ceit' meaning dark or gloomy place, perhaps referring to thick woods near the village. Catrine was constructed around one of the first cotton mills in Scotland in 1787 by Claud Alexander of Ballochmyle (who had made a not insignificant fortune as Commissary General in India) in partnership with David Dale. A plan of Catrine at that time shows the hamlet consisted of 11 buildings, including a smithy and corn mill.

=== Industrialisation ===
In 1801 the factory was purchased by Messrs James Finlay & Co., of Glasgow. In 1802, two artificial lochs, covering between them 120 acres (0.49 km^{2}), were constructed above Muirkirk, near the village of Glenbuck, to supply the cotton works. The business was greatly enlarged in 1823 when they added extensive bleaching works. The motive power for the works was supplied by wooden wheels, made from oak grown on Drumlanrig estate.

In 1828, the wooden wheels were replaced by two large iron wheels; steam engines of 500 horsepower (370 kW) were later added as auxiliary. When constructed, the iron wheels were the largest in Britain. The diameter of each wheel was 50 feet (15 m), 157 feet (48 m) in circumference, and 12 feet (3.7 m) broad, or 11 feet (3.4 m) within the buckets. There were 120 buckets on each wheel. Each bucket contained 11 cubic feet (0.31 m^{3}) of water. The wheels made three revolutions per minute, and passed 360 buckets per minute, 3,960 cubic feet (112 m^{3}) of water per wheel, 7,920 for the two, equal to 210 tons of water per minute. They were 500 nominal horsepower. These wheels were a tourist attraction in their day and continued in service until the 1940s.

A new mill was completed in 1950 but closed some 20 years later. The old mill was destroyed by fire during its demolition in 1963. The new mill was used for several years as a large furniture warehouse, but was eventually demolished in 1985. Iron Age rock art in the form of cup and ring marks has been found at nearby Ballochmyle.

=== Contemporary history ===
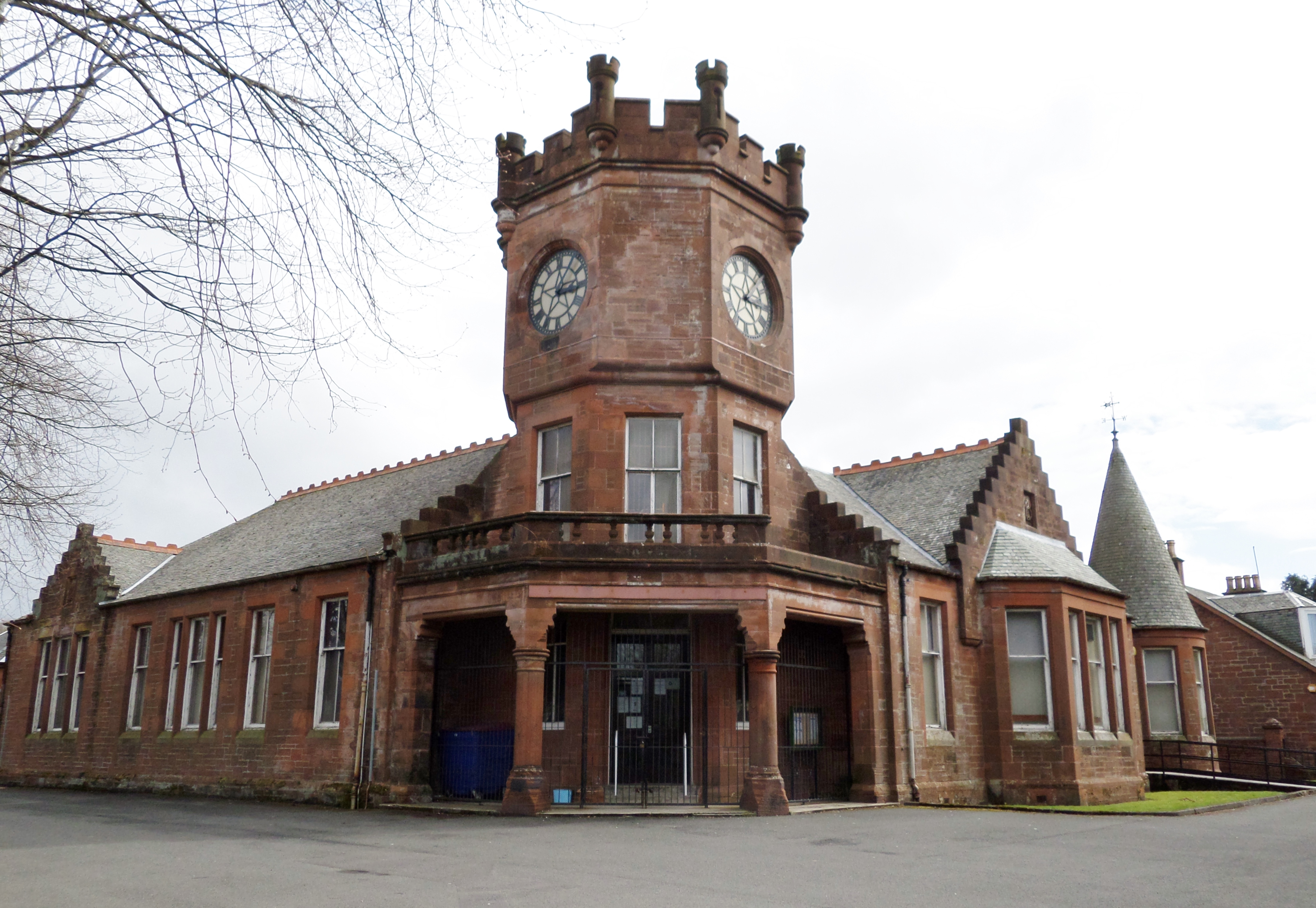
The village hall

Catrine today is a village of around 2,500 inhabitants. The site of the former bleaching works of Messrs Finlay & Co. is now occupied by Glen Catrine Bond which bottles whisky and vodka and markets them under a number of different brand names.

In 2006, the so-called Catrine Voes (the reservoirs to the former cotton works), the Radical Brae and the Chapel Brae were designated as a Local Nature Reserve. The weir, the reservoirs and other structures (lades, tunnels and suchlike) comprise a Scheduled Monument and are in the ownership of Catrine Community Trust (formerly Catrine Voes Trust), a charitable trust. Catrine Community Trust is actively engaged in seeking funding to conserve and restore these for future generations to enjoy.

== Demography ==
=== Geography ===
The village lies on the River Ayr which previously provided water power for local industry. It is in the parish of Sorn, 2 miles (3.2 km) south east of Mauchline. Catrine is surrounded by woods, fields and hills. There is Ballochmyle golf course that sits just outside of Catrine. There is also Ballochmyle house (18th century mansion) that overlooks Catrine.

=== Transport ===
The A76 road lies south west of Catrine. A railway branch line to Catrine (Glasgow & South Western Railway) was one of the last to be built in Scotland in the 20th century. Catrine's station opened in 1903. The line closed to scheduled passenger services in 1943, although it continued to be used for freight and the occasional enthusiast railtour until the 1960s when the line was closed.

== Notable people ==
Nether Catrine House was the country seat of the philosopher Dugald Stewart, Professor of Moral Philosophy at the University of Edinburgh from 1785 and is located on the south bank of the River Ayr. It was here that the poet, Robert Burns, famously "dinner'd wi a lord".
