= Trawsfynydd nuclear power station =

Decommissioned nuclear power plant in Wales

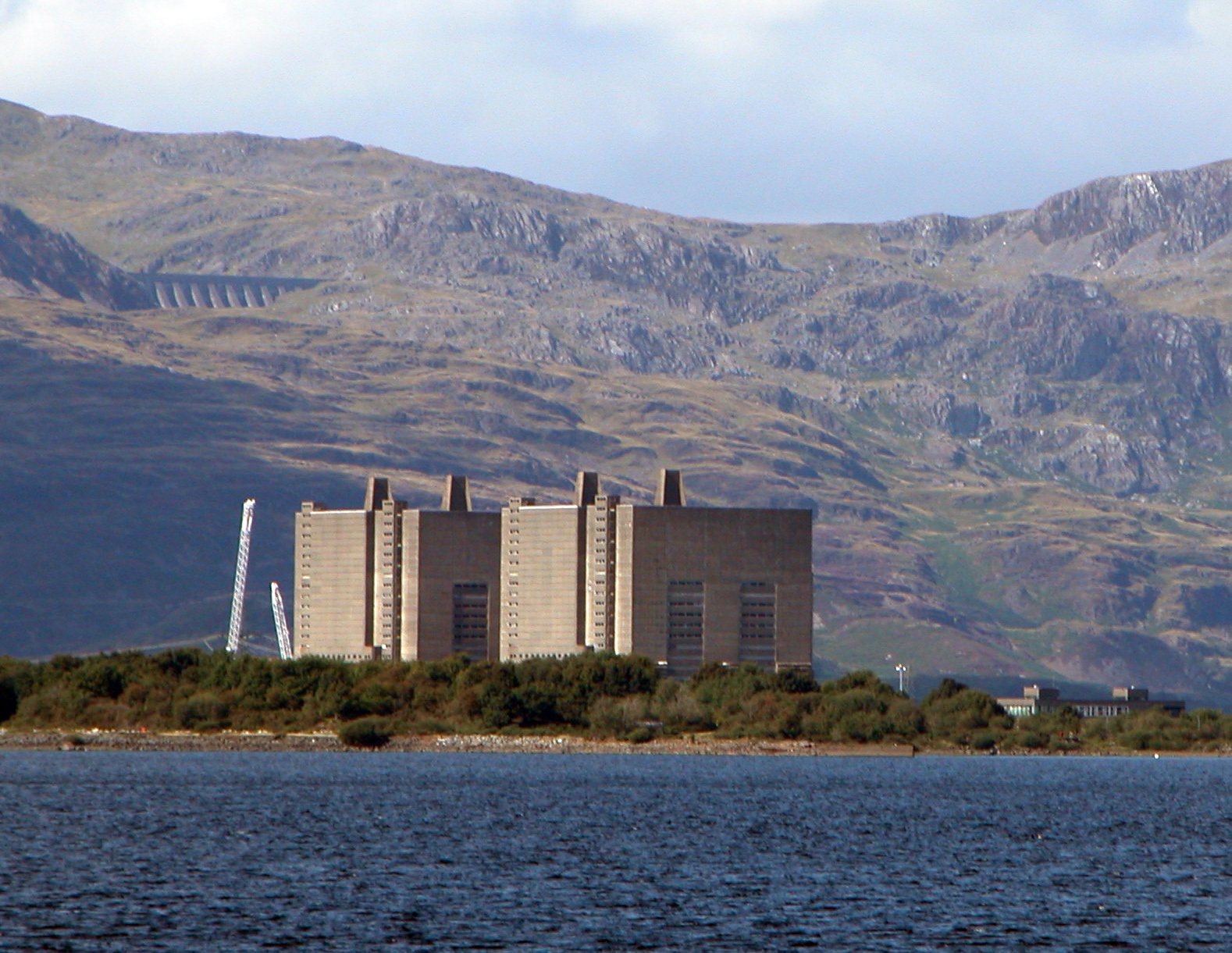
- Country: Wales, United Kingdom
- Location: Trawsfynydd, Gwynedd
- Coordinates: 52°55′29.51″N 3°56′54.38″W
- Status: Decommissioning in progress
- Construction began: 1959
- Commission date: 1965
- Decommission date: 1991
- Construction cost: £103 million
- Owner: Nuclear Decommissioning Authority
- Operator: Nuclear Restoration Services

Nuclear power station
- Reactor type: Magnox
- Reactor supplier: Atomic Power Constructions

Power generation
- Make and model: Richardsons Westgarth
- Units decommissioned: 2 x 235 MW
- Nameplate capacity: 500 MWe

External links
- Commons: Related media on Commons

Trawsfynydd nuclear power station (Welsh: Atomfa Trawsfynydd) is a former Magnox nuclear power station situated in Snowdonia National Park in Gwynedd, Wales. The plant, which became operational in 1965, was the only nuclear power station in the UK to be built inland, with cooling water that was taken from the artificial Llyn Trawsfynydd reservoir which also supplies the hydro-electric Maentwrog power station. It was closed in 1991 and is undergoing decommissioning by Nuclear Restoration Services, a process originally projected to take almost 100 years.. While the Welsh government initially explored redevelopment via small modular reactors (SMRs) in 2021, the UK's Great British Energy – Nuclear (GBE-N) selected Wylfa over Trawsfynydd for its first SMR phase in 2025 due to site constraints. Consequently, current site activity focuses on a £70 million programme to reduce the height of the reactor buildings (commenced 2025) and the development of an Innovation, Business and Skills Centre approved by Cyngor Gwynedd in 2026 to drive local economic regeneration.

== History ==
The power station, which takes its name from the nearby village of Trawsfynydd, was designed by Basil Spence. The construction, which was undertaken by a consortium involving Crompton Parkinson, International Combustion, Fairey Engineering and Richardsons Westgarth, and known as the Atomic Power Constructions (APC), began in July 1959, and both of the reactors were in operation by March 1965, with the station opening fully in October 1968, at a cost of £103 million. It had two Magnox reactors producing 470 megawatts (MW) in total from four turbines, each rated at 145MWe. The reactors were supplied by APC and the turbines by Richardsons Westgarth. The civil engineering work was undertaken by Holland, Hannen & Cubitts and Trollope & Colls. The architectural consultant for the buildings was Sir Basil Spence and the landscape architect was Sylvia Crowe. The setting for the power station which Crowe developed is designated Grade II* on the Cadw/ICOMOS Register of Parks and Gardens of Special Historic Interest in Wales. Four Paxman 12YLC diesel engines, each driving a 1.2MW Crompton Parkinson alternator were installed for emergency standby duties.

Nuclear flasks were transported to Trawsfynydd on a section of the former Bala to Blaenau Ffestiniog railway that had been closed in January 1961. A single track was restored northwards with an entirely new line through the centre of Blaenau Ffestiniog that connected to the Conwy Valley branch. In 1963-64, a "Goliath" gantry crane was installed over sidings about 1/2 mi (0.80 km) east of the power station. Beginning on 20 April 1964, nuclear flasks could be transported by rail between destinations such as Sellafield in Cumbria. The last train to carry nuclear material from Trawsfynydd left on 22 April 1997 hauled by EWS Loco 37426. The line was subsequently mothballed. In 2016, enthusiasts, who want to create a heritage railway, began clearing vegetation along the route but have since been halted and are negotiating a new licence to clear.

== Decommissioning ==
Trawsfynydd was shut down in 1991. The Nuclear Decommissioning Authority subsidiary Nuclear Restoration Services, formerly Magnox Ltd, is decommissioning the site. The work is expected to last decades.

Beginning in 1993, the highly-radioactive spent fuel rods were removed from both Magnox reactors and sent by rail to Sellafield. This was completed in 1997. All remaining intermediate level waste – such as on the walls of the cooling ponds or pipes – was removed by March 2026. Contaminated material is stored in a specially designed building on the site.

=== Major structural reduction ===
In October 2025, Nuclear Restoration Services awarded a £70 million to Costain to reduce the height of the two reactor buildings from 54 to 25 m (177 to 82 ft). This work, which was scheduled to begin in autumn 2025 and last approximately four years, is designed to prepare the buildings for safe and efficient demolition, reshaping the site's iconic skyline through the partial removal of the upper sections of both reactor buildings.

The two reactor buildings, now over 60 years old, have experienced structural wear due to prolonged exposure to the elements. Extensive enabling work has already been completed, including the installation of new internal roofs at a lower level, major de-planting of the primary boiler sections, and re-routing of electrical supplies; all designed to prepare the buildings for safe and efficient demolition.

In preparation for the major structural reduction works, Radius Group announced in early 2026 the formation of a dedicated lifting team, with operations estimated to commence in November 2026. This team will support the complex tower crane operations required for the reactor building reduction.

=== Long-term clearance targets ===
Final clearance of the site is scheduled to begin in 2071. By 2083, the area is expected to have been restored to its pre-nuclear state; 124 years after construction started and 92 years after the closure of Trawsfynydd power station.

== Future redevelopment and economic regeneration ==
The Welsh government has decided to redevelop the plant using small-scale reactors, as a step toward meeting the UK's targets for reducing carbon emissions. In 2021, the government chose Mike Tynan of Westinghouse to lead a company tasked with developing the new reactors.

=== Dual-track strategy ===
While the Nuclear Decommissioning Authority maintains a long-term target for full site clearance by 2083, strategies in 2025-2026 have prioritized interim economic regeneration. This involves developing the site for innovation and skills hubs while simultaneously executing major structural reduction works to facilitate future flexibility.

=== Small Modular Reactor (SMR) prospects ===
==== The GBE-N/Rolls-Royce Programme ====
Great British Energy – Nuclear (GBE-N) selected Rolls-Royce SMR as its preferred partner in June 2025, allocating £2.6 billion in the 2025 Spending Review to fund the programme. Following an assessment of Wylfa in North Wales and Oldbury-on-Severn in Gloucestershire, GBE-N confirmed Wylfa as the site for the UK's first government-backed SMR project in November 2025, explicitly ruling out Trawsfynydd for this initial phase due to constraints on site availability and generation capacity.

In May 2026, GBE-N formally signed a contract with Rolls-Royce SMR to commence site-specific design, regulatory engagement, and planning for three 470MW units at Wylfa, supported by a £599 million loan from the National Wealth Fund for generic design work applicable to future UK and export projects. While GBE-N acknowledged Cwmni Egino's (a Welsh Government company established to support the delivery of nuclear development at Trawsfynydd) progress and described Trawsfynydd as an "interesting site for future nuclear development," the organisation confirmed it would not be included in the first phase of deployment, which targets grid connection by the mid-2030s.

==== The Cwmni Egino initiative ====
The Welsh government has decided to redevelop the plant using small-scale reactors, as a step toward meeting the UK's targets for reducing carbon emissions. In 2021, the government chose Mike Tynan of Westinghouse to lead a company tasked with developing the new reactors. On 20 May 2022, the government announced that the NDA will work with Cwmni Egino to develop land adjacent to the site for a 300 MW small modular reactor (SMR). Cwmni Egino said it would discuss with interested parties and hoped to announce plans within one year. In December 2022, a second consortium presented its proposals to use their own design of SMR in competition to the original bid.

The Welsh government took the decision to substantially cut Cwmni Egino's budget from £2 million in 2023/24 to £500,000 for 2024/25, following GBN's indication that Trawsfynydd was not favoured for first-of-a-kind SMR development.

However, the UK Government has stated that Trawsfynydd could be a candidate for new nuclear in future and is one of a number of potential sites that could host new civil nuclear projects, subject to national planning policy, regulatory approvals and technical assessments.

=== Innovation, Business and Skills Centre ===
In February 2026, Cyngor Gwynedd's Cabinet endorsed a £20 million proposal to establish an Innovation, Business and Skills Centre at the Trawsfynydd site, intended as the first phase of a wider masterplan within the Snowdonia Enterprise Zone and North Wales AI Growth Zone. Designed to catalyze socio-economic regeneration in Meirionnydd, the multi-use hub will provide office, laboratory, and training facilities focused on nuclear decommissioning, low-carbon energy, AI, and emerging technologies. An outline business case was subsequently submitted to Ambition North Wales for Growth Deal funding.

== See also ==
- Wylfa Nuclear Power Station, shutdown Magnox reactor in Anglesey
- Energy policy of the United Kingdom
- Nuclear power in the United Kingdom
- Energy use and conservation in the United Kingdom

== Citations ==
Bibliography

- Mitchell, Vic; Smith, Keith (2010). Bala to Llandudno: Featuring Blaenau Ffestiniog. Midhurst, West Sussex: Middleton Press (MD). ISBN 978-1-906008-87-1.
- Southern, D. W. (1995). Bala Junction to Blaenau Ffestiniog (Scenes from the Past, Railways of North Wales, No. 25). Stockport: Foxline Publishing. ISBN 1-8701-19-34-7.
