= Nuclear flask =

Containers used to transport nuclear material

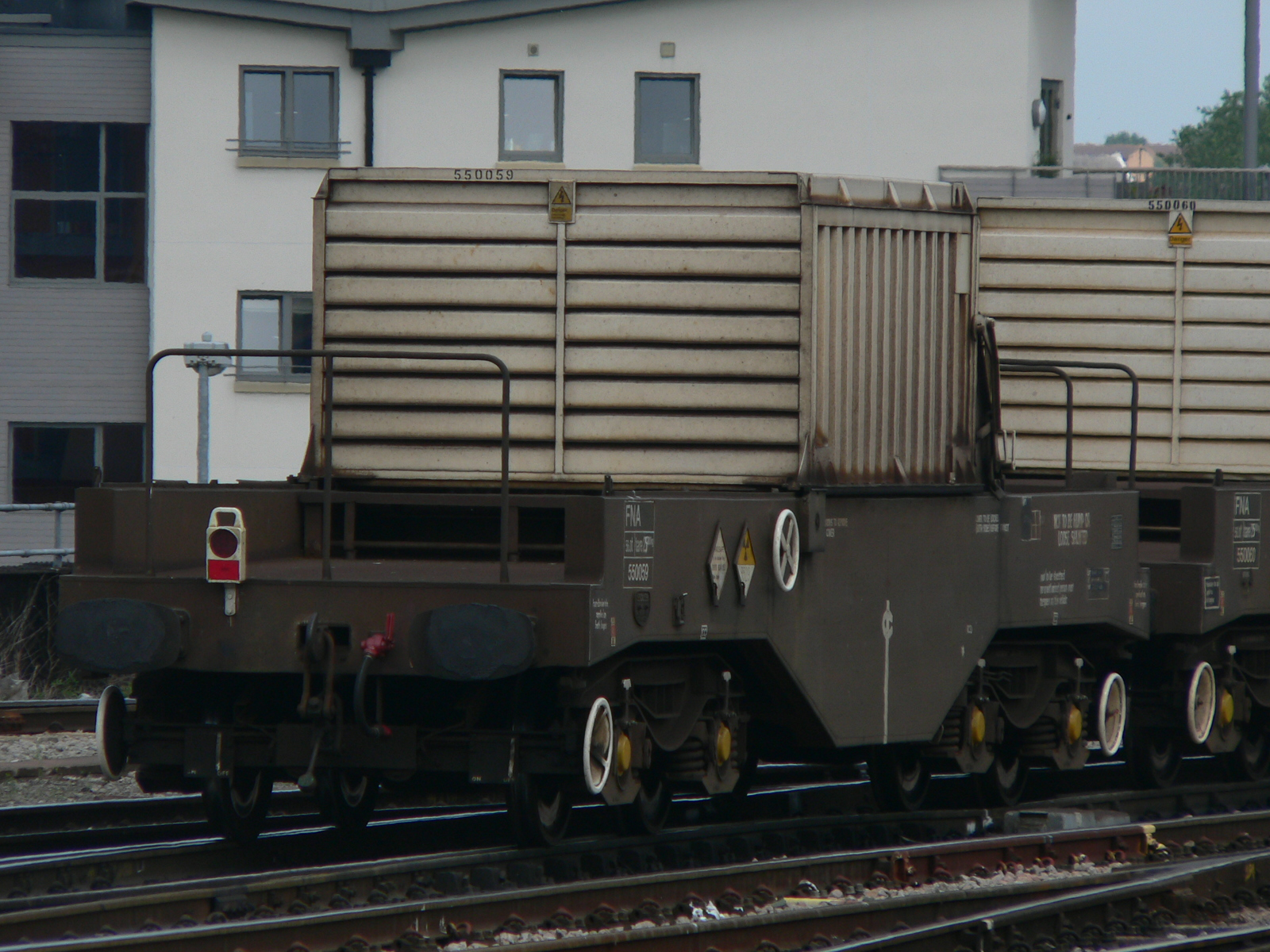
Wagon with transport cabin containing a nuclear waste flask, at Bristol

A nuclear flask is a shipping container that is used to transport active nuclear materials between nuclear power station and spent fuel reprocessing facilities.

Each shipping container is designed to maintain its integrity under normal transportation conditions and during hypothetical accident conditions. They must protect their contents against damage from the outside world, such as impact or fire. They must also contain their contents from leakage, both for physical leakage and for radiological shielding.

A typical SNF shipping cask mounted on a railroad car

Spent nuclear fuel shipping casks are used to transport spent nuclear fuel used in nuclear power plants and research reactors to disposal sites such as the nuclear reprocessing center at COGEMA La Hague site.

== International ==
=== United Kingdom ===
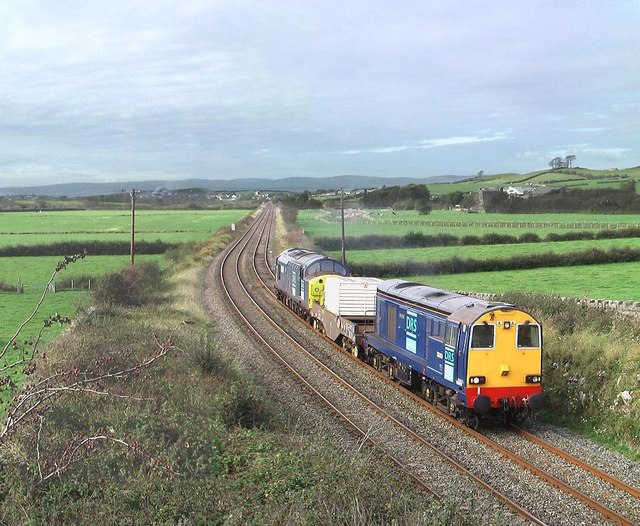
Nuclear flask train near the Sellafield nuclear spent fuel reprocessing facility in the UK

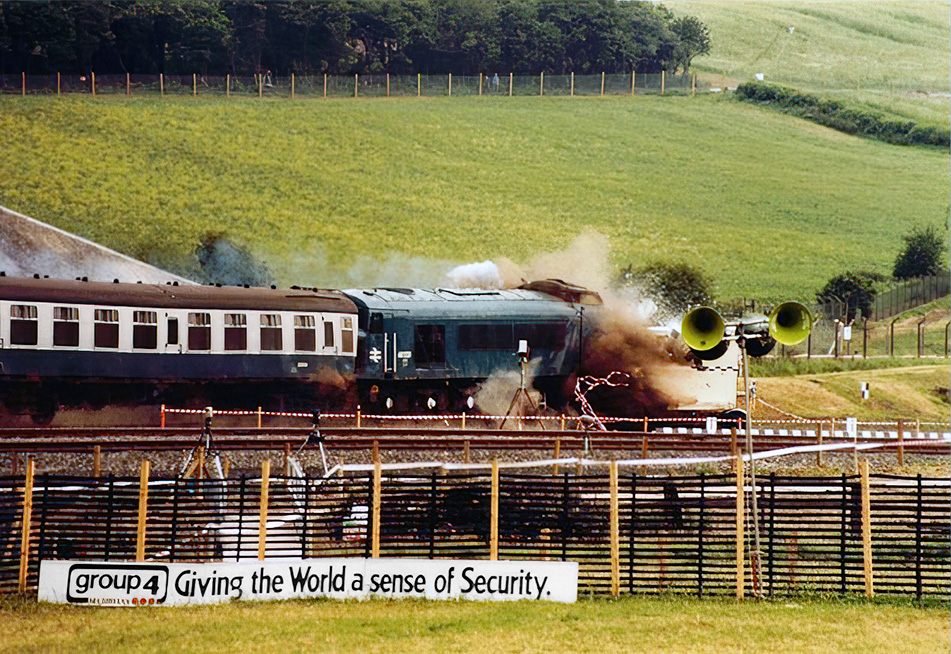
1980s Old Dalby Test Track test against a flask in its most vulnerable position. Video footage is available on various hosting services.

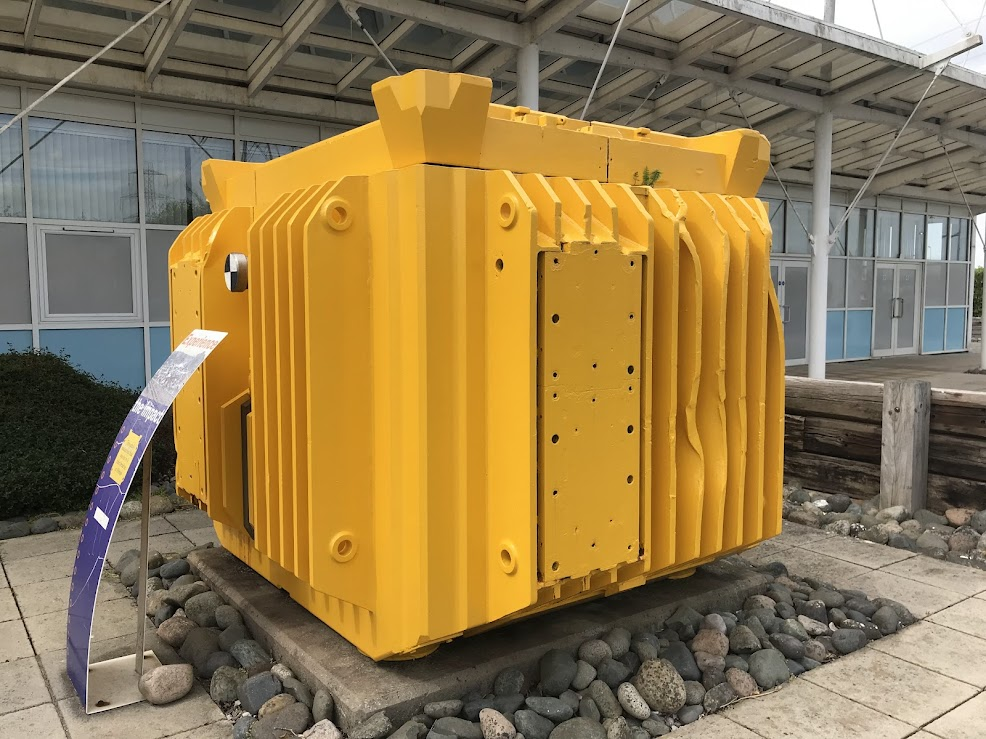
The nuclear flask used in the Old Dalby crashworthiness test on display at Heysham 1 nuclear power station showing minor superficial damage.

Railway-carried flasks are used to transport spent fuel from nuclear power stations in the UK and the Sellafield spent nuclear fuel reprocessing facility. Each flask weighs more than 50 tonnes (110,000 lb), and transports usually no more than 2.5 tonnes (5,500 lb) of spent nuclear fuel.

Over the past 35 years, British Nuclear Fuels plc (BNFL) and its subsidiary PNTL have conducted over 14,000 cask shipments of SNF worldwide, transporting more than 9,000 tonnes of SNF over 16 million miles via road, rail, and sea without a radiological release. BNFL designed, licensed, and currently own and operate a fleet of approximately 170 casks of the Excellox design. BNFL has maintained a fleet of transport casks to ship SNF for the United Kingdom, continental Europe, and Japan for reprocessing.

In the UK a series of public demonstrations were conducted in which spent fuel flasks (loaded with steel bars) were subjected to simulated accident conditions. A randomly selected flask (never used for holding used fuel) from the production line was first dropped from a tower. The flask was dropped in such a way that the weakest part of it would hit the ground first. The lid of the flask was slightly damaged but very little material escaped from the flask. A little water escaped from the flask but it was thought that in a real accident that the escape of radioactivity associated with this water would not be a threat to humans or their environment.

For a second test the same flask was fitted with a new lid, filled again with steel bars and water before a train was driven into it at high speed. The flask survived with only cosmetic damage while the train was destroyed. Although referred to as a test, the actual stresses the flask underwent were well below what they are designed to withstand, as much of the energy from the collision was absorbed by the train and in moving the flask some distance. This flask is on display at the training centre at Heysham 1 Power Station.

==== Description ====
Introduced in the early 1960s, Magnox flasks consists of four layers; an internal skip containing the waste; guides and protectors surrounding the skip; all contained within the 370-millimetre-thick (15 in) steel main body of flask itself, with characteristic cooling fins; and (since the early 1990s) a transport cabin of panels which provide an external housing. Flasks for waste from the later advanced gas cooled reactor power stations are similar, but have thinner steel main walls at 90-millimetre-thick (3.5 in) thickness, to allow room for extensive internal lead shielding. The flask is protected by a bolt hasp which prevents the content from being accessed during transit.

==== Transport ====
All the flasks are owned by the Nuclear Decommissioning Authority, the owners of Direct Rail Services. A train conveying flasks would be hauled by two locomotives, either Class 20 or Class 37, but Class 66 and Class 68 locomotives are increasingly being used; locomotives are used in pairs as a precaution in case one fails en route. Greenpeace protest that flasks in rail transit pose a hazard to passengers standing on platforms, although many tests performed by the Health and Safety Executive have proved that it is safe for passengers to stand on the platform while a flask passes by.

==== Safety ====
The crashworthiness of the flask was demonstrated publicly when a British Rail Class 46 locomotive was forcibly driven into a derailed flask (containing water and steel rods in place of radioactive material) at 100 miles per hour (160 km/h); the flask sustaining minimal superficial damage without compromising its integrity, while both the flatbed wagon carrying it and the locomotive were more-or-less destroyed. Additionally, flasks were heated to temperatures of over 800 °C (1,470 °F) to prove safety in a fire. However, critics consider the testing flawed for various reasons. The heat test is claimed to be considerably below that of theoretical worst-case fires in a tunnel, and the worst case impact today would have a closing speed of around 170 miles per hour (270 km/h). Nevertheless, there have been several accidents involving flasks, including derailments, collisions, and even a flask being dropped during transfer from train to road, with no leakage having occurred.

Problems have been found where flasks "sweat", when small amounts of radioactive material absorbed into paint migrate to the surface, causing contamination risks. Studies identified that 10–15% of flasks in the United Kingdom were suffering from this problem, but none exceeded the international recommended safety limits. Similar flasks in mainland Europe were found to marginally exceed the contamination limits during testing, and additional monitoring procedures were put into place. In order to reduce the risk, current UK flask wagons are fitted with a lockable cover to ensure any surface contamination remains within the container, and all containers are tested before shipment, with those exceeding the safety level being cleaned until they are within the limit. A report in 2001 identified potential risks, and actions to be taken to ensure safety.

=== United States ===
A typical small SNF shipping cask being mounted on a truck

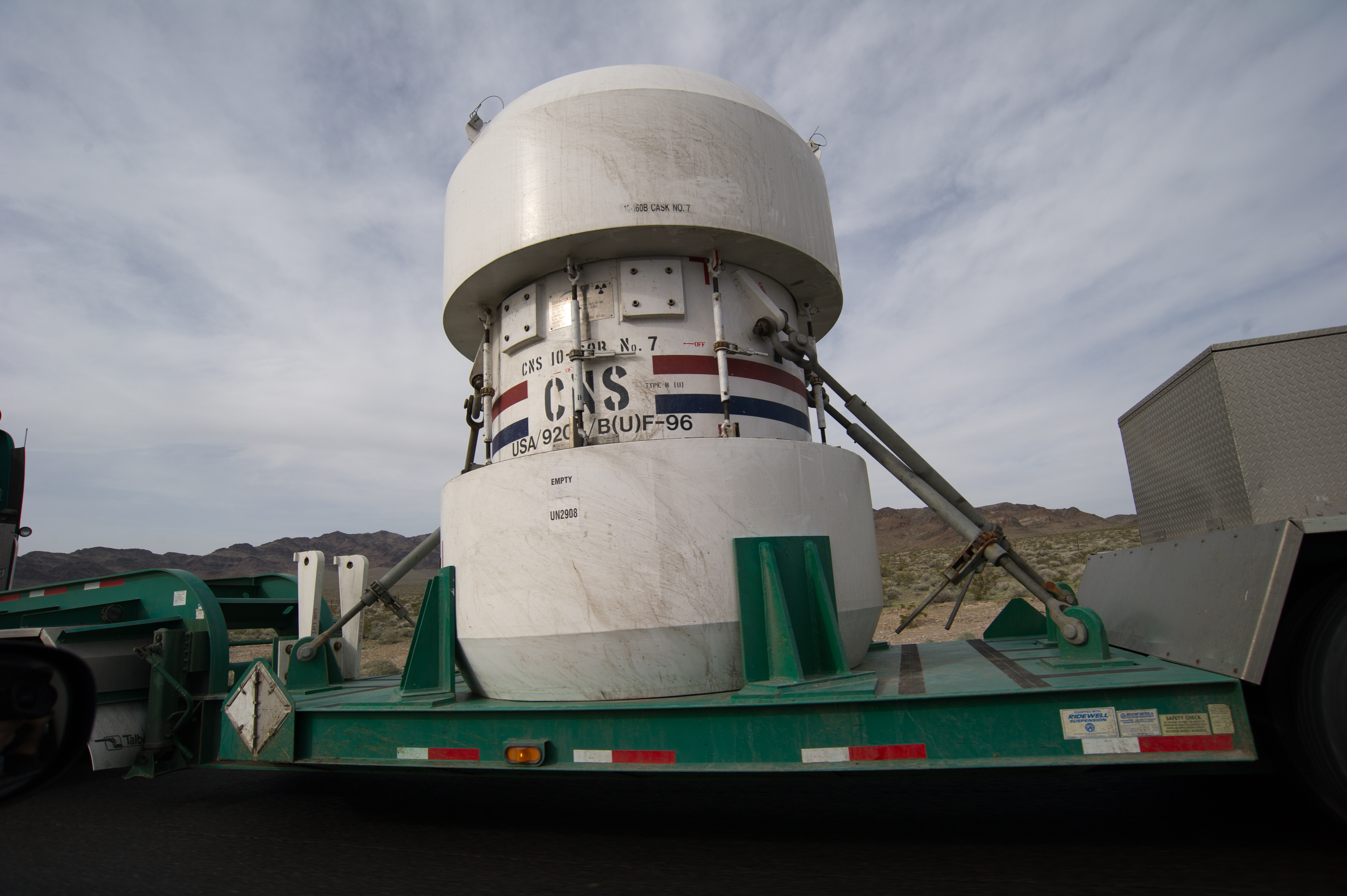
A nuclear waste container from Nevada National Security Site is transported on public roads

In the United States, the acceptability of the design of each cask is judged against Title 10, Part 71, of the Code of Federal Regulations (other nations' shipping casks, possibly excluding Russia's, are designed and tested to similar standards (International Atomic Energy Agency "Regulations for the Safe Transport of Radioactive Material" No. TS-R-1)). The designs must demonstrate (possibly by computer modelling) protection against radiological release to the environment under all four of the following hypothetical accident conditions, designed to encompass 99% of all accidents:

- A 9 m (30 ft) free fall onto an unyielding surface
- A puncture test allowing the container to free-fall 1 m (39 in) onto a 15 cm (5.9 in) steel rod
- A 30-minute, all-engulfing fire at 800 °C (1,470 °F)
- An 8-hour immersion under 0.9 m (3.0 ft) of water
- Further, an undamaged package must be subjected to a 1-hour immersion under 200 m (660 ft) of water.

In addition, between 1975 and 1977 Sandia National Laboratories conducted full-scale crash tests on spent nuclear fuel shipping casks. Although the casks were damaged, none would have leaked.

Although the U.S. Department of Transportation (DOT) has the primary responsibility for regulating the safe transport of radioactive materials in the United States, the Nuclear Regulatory Commission (NRC) requires that licensees and carriers involved in spent fuel shipments:

- Follow only approved routes;
- Provide armed escorts for heavily populated areas;
- Use immobilization devices;
- Provide monitoring and redundant communications;
- Coordinate with law enforcement agencies before shipments; and
- Notify in advance the NRC and States through which the shipments will pass.

Since 1965, approximately 3,000 shipments of spent nuclear fuel have been transported safely over the U.S.'s highways, waterways, and railroads.

==== Baltimore train tunnel fire ====
On July 18, 2001, a freight train carrying hazardous (non-nuclear) materials derailed and caught fire while passing through the Howard Street railroad tunnel in downtown Baltimore, Maryland, United States. The fire burned for 3 days, with temperatures as high as 1,000 °C (1,830 °F). Since the casks are designed for a 30-minute fire at 800 °C, several reports have been made regarding the inability of the casks to survive a fire similar to the Baltimore one. However, nuclear waste would never be transported together with hazardous (flammable or explosive) materials on the same train or track.

==== State of Nevada ====
The State of Nevada, USA, released a report entitled, "Implications of the Baltimore Rail Tunnel Fire for Full-Scale Testing of Shipping Casks" on February 25, 2003. In the report, they said a hypothetical spent nuclear fuel accident based on the Baltimore fire:

- "Concluded steel-lead-steel cask would have failed after 6.3 hours; monolithic steel cask would have failed after 11-12.5 hours."
- "Contaminated Area: 32 square miles (82 km^{2})"
- "Latent cancer fatalities: 4,000-28,000 over 50 years (200-1,400 during first year)"
- "Cleanup cost: $13.7 Billion (2001 Dollars)"

==== National Academy of Sciences ====
The National Academy of Sciences, at the request of the State of Nevada, produced a report on July 25, 2003. The report concluded that the following should be done:

- "Need to 3-D model (bolts, seals, etc) more than HI-STAR cask for extreme fire environments."
- "For safety and risk analysis, casks should be physically tested to destruction."
- "NRC should release all thermal calculations; Holtec is withholding allegedly proprietary information."

==== NRC ====
The U.S. Nuclear Regulatory Commission released a report in November 2006. It concluded:

The results of this evaluation also strongly indicate that neither spent nuclear fuel (SNF) particles nor fission products would be released from a spent fuel transportation package carrying intact spent fuel involved in a severe tunnel fire such as the Baltimore tunnel fire. None of the three package designs analyzed for the Baltimore tunnel fire scenario (TN-68, HI-STAR 100, and NAC LWT) experienced internal temperatures that would result in rupture of the fuel cladding. Therefore, radioactive material (i.e., SNF particles or fission products) would be retained within the fuel rods.
There would be no release from the HI-STAR 100, because the inner welded canister remains leak tight. While a release is unlikely, the potential releases calculated for the TN-68 rail package and the NAC LWT truck package indicate that any release of CRUD from either package would be very small - less than an A2 quantity.

=== Canada ===
By comparison there has been limited spent nuclear fuel transport in Canada. Transportation casks have been designed for truck and rail transport and Canada's regulatory body, the Canadian Nuclear Safety Commission, granted approval for casks, which may be used for barge shipments as well. The commission's regulations prohibit the disclosure of location, routing and timing of shipments of nuclear materials, such as spent fuel.

== International maritime transport ==
Nuclear flasks containing spent nuclear fuel are sometimes transported by sea for the purposes of reprocessing or relocation to a storage facility. Vessels receiving these cargoes are variously classified INF-1, INF-2 or INF-3 by the International Maritime Organisation. The code was introduced as a voluntary system in 1993 and became mandatory in 2001. The "INF" acronym stands for "Irradiated Nuclear Fuel" though the classification also covers "plutonium and high-level waste" cargoes. In order to receive these classifications, vessels must meet a range of structural and safety standards. Vessels used for the transportation of spent nuclear fuel are typically purpose built and are commonly referred to as Nuclear Fuel Carriers. The global fleet includes vessels under flags of the United Kingdom, Japan, Russian Federation, China and Sweden.

== See also ==
- Dry cask storage
- Nuclear reprocessing
- Radioactive waste
- Safeguards Transporter
- Spent fuel pool
