= Glan Conwy railway station =

Railway station in Conwy, Wales

Glan Conwy
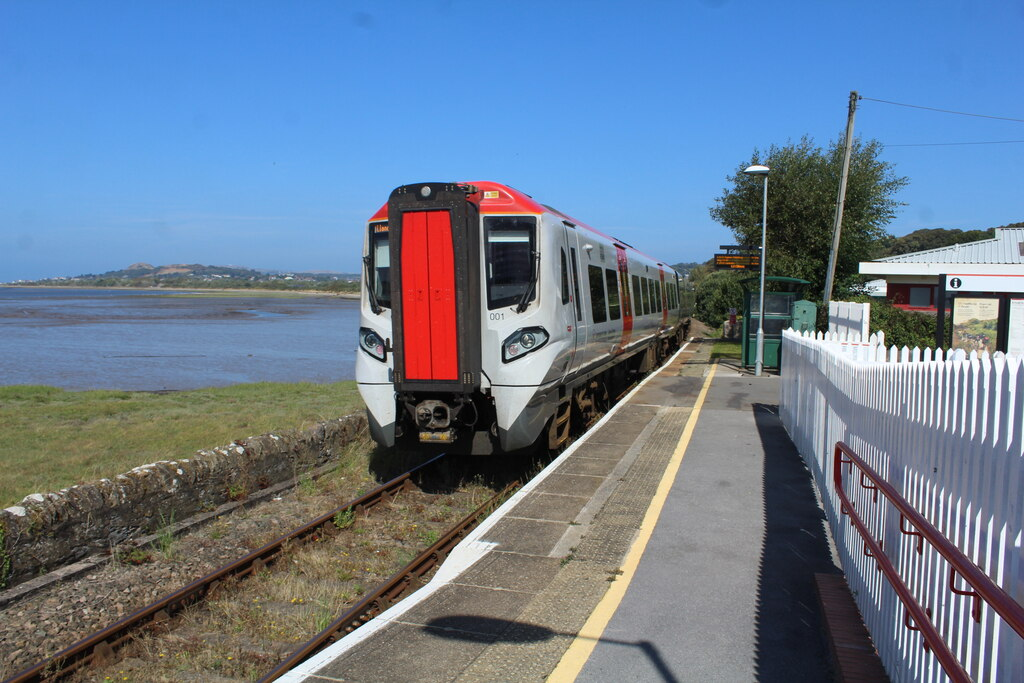
- Glan Conwy station platform (2024)

General information
- Location: Glan Conwy, Conwy; Wales
- Coordinates: 53.267°N 3.798°W
- Grid reference: SH802761
- Manager: Transport for Wales Rail
- Platforms: 1

Other information
- Station code: GCW
- Classification: DfT category F2

History
- Original company: Conway and Llanrwst Railway
- Pre-grouping: London and North Western Railway
- Post-grouping: London Midland and Scottish Railway

Key dates
- 17 June 1863: Opened as Llansaintffraid
- 1 January 1865: Renamed Glan Conway
- 26 October 1964: Closed
- 4 May 1970: Reopened
- 12 May 1980: Renamed Glan Conwy

Passengers
- 2021/22: ▲2,614
- 2022/23: ▲3,620
- 2023/24: ▲4,764
- 2024/25: ▲7,148
- 2025/26: ▲8,706
Location
Notes
- Passenger statistics from the Office of Rail and Road

Glan Conwy railway station is on the east bank of the River Conwy on the A470 road in the centre of the village of Llansanffraid Glan Conwy, Wales and is located on the Llandudno Junction to Blaenau Ffestiniog Conwy Valley Line. There are through services to Blaenau Ffestiniog and Llandudno.

== History ==
The station was opened by the Conway and Llanrwst Railway on 17 June 1863, and was originally named Llansaintffraid; it was renamed Glan Conway on 1 January 1865.

Until around 1959, the station had its own Station Master. Afterwards, it was supervised by the Tal-y-Cafn station master. The staff comprised two porters working an early and late shift between them. A siding was provided which catered for coal and agricultural traffic. From 1954 to 1964 a camping coach was situated in the siding and used by holidaymakers.

The station was closed to passenger traffic on 26 October 1964, during the Beeching era, but reopened on 4 May 1970. On 12 May 1980 it was renamed Glan Conwy.

== Facilities ==
The station buildings are in private occupation. The station is operated as an unstaffed halt and is a request stop - all tickets must be purchased on the train or prior to travel. Entrance is by a ramp from the end of the lower and original platform, where there is a small shelter. The station is fitted with digital information screens for providing running information, along with a payphone and timetable poster boards.

== Services ==
Five southbound and six northbound trains call on request Mon-Sat (approximately every three hours), with four trains each way on Sundays. As of March 2019 however, services from here were suspended due to major infrastructure damage to the track and formation caused by Storm Gareth. Several sections of embankment have been washed out by the River Conwy and needed repaired before the line reopened. A replacement bus service was in operation in the meantime. Services resumed on 18 July as far as Llanrwst, with the remainder of the line reopening on 24 July. Further storm damage to the south (this time from Storm Ciara) in February 2020 with services again being suspended until the line was reopened on 28 September 2020.

Preceding station	National Rail	Following station
Llandudno Junction	Transport for Wales Rail; Conwy Valley Line	Tal-y-Cafn
