= North Llanrwst railway station =

Railway station in Conwy, Wales

North Llanrwst Welsh: Gogledd Llanrwst
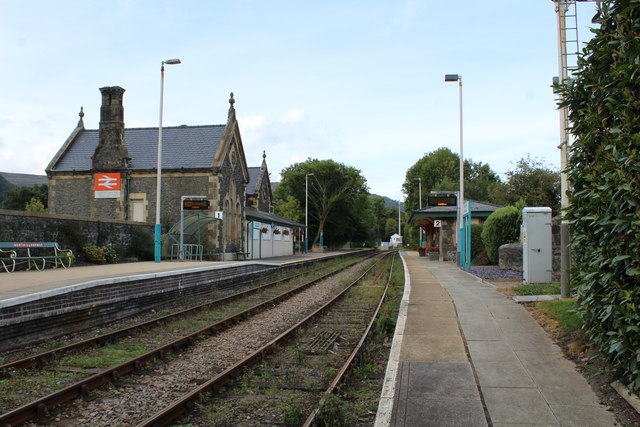

General information
- Location: Llanrwst, Conwy County Borough; Wales
- Coordinates: 53.144°N 3.803°W
- Grid reference: SH795622
- Manager: Transport for Wales Rail
- Platforms: 2

Other information
- Station code: NLR
- Classification: DfT category F2

History
- Original company: Conway and Llanrwst Railway
- Pre-grouping: London and North Western Railway
- Post-grouping: London, Midland and Scottish Railway

Key dates
- 17 June 1863: Station opened as Llanrwst
- 6 April 1868: Station resited
- April 1884: Renamed Llanrwst and Trefriw
- 6 May 1974: Renamed Llanrwst
- 29 July 1989: Renamed Llanrwst North
- December 2004: Renamed North Llanrwst

Passengers
- 2021/22: ▲1,420
- 2022/23: ▲2,414
- 2023/24: ▲3,362
- 2024/25: ▲4,392
- 2025/26: ▲4,806

Listed Building – Grade II
- Feature: North Llanrwst Station (Main Building)
- Designated: 19 February 1993
- Reference no.: 16520
Location
Notes
- Passenger statistics from the Office of Rail and Road

North Llanrwst railway station (Welsh: Gogledd Llanrwst) is the only train passing station on the Conwy Valley line between Llandudno Junction and Blaenau Ffestiniog in Wales. The station has had several previous names, including Llanrwst and Trefriw, Llanrwst and Llanrwst North. This station is also a request stop.

In September 2024, it was confirmed that Transport for Wales would fund renaming the station as "North Llanrwst and Trefriw".

== History ==
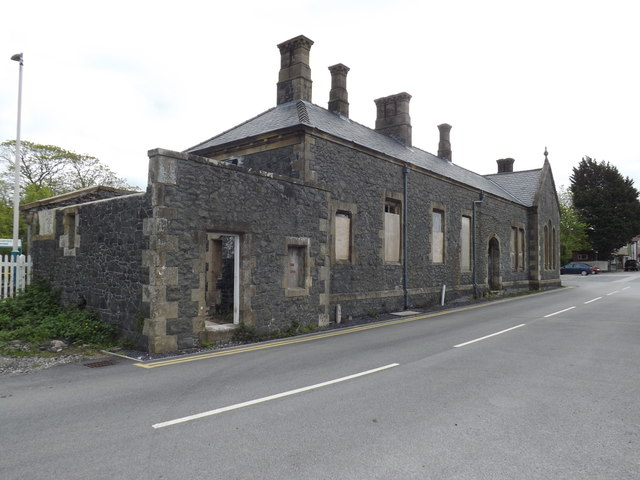
Disused grade-II station building (May 2015)

The station and its goods yard were opened on 17 June 1863 as the Llanrwst terminus of the Conway and Llanrwst Railway that was taken over by the London and North Western Railway (LNWR) in 1867 and extended to Betws-y-Coed in 1869. To accommodate the southward extension, the station was resited on 6 April 1868. This station was renamed Llanrwst and Trefriw in April 1884 following the formal opening of the Gower pedestrian road to Trefriw in May 1881, reverting to its original name Llanrwst during the British Railways era, on 6 May 1974. The grade-II station buildings are largely intact, though mostly disused, and there is a working signal box north of the station at which trains must stop to exchange tokens. The extensive station yard is now used for light industry.

The platforms heights here are low and wooden boarding steps were provided on both platforms for many years – easy access ramps have now been fitted to improve accessibility on each side. Shelters are provided on both platforms, along with digital CIS displays a pay phone and timetable posters to offer train running information. The platforms are linked via a barrow crossing, so mobility-impaired and wheelchair users are advised not to use this without assistance.

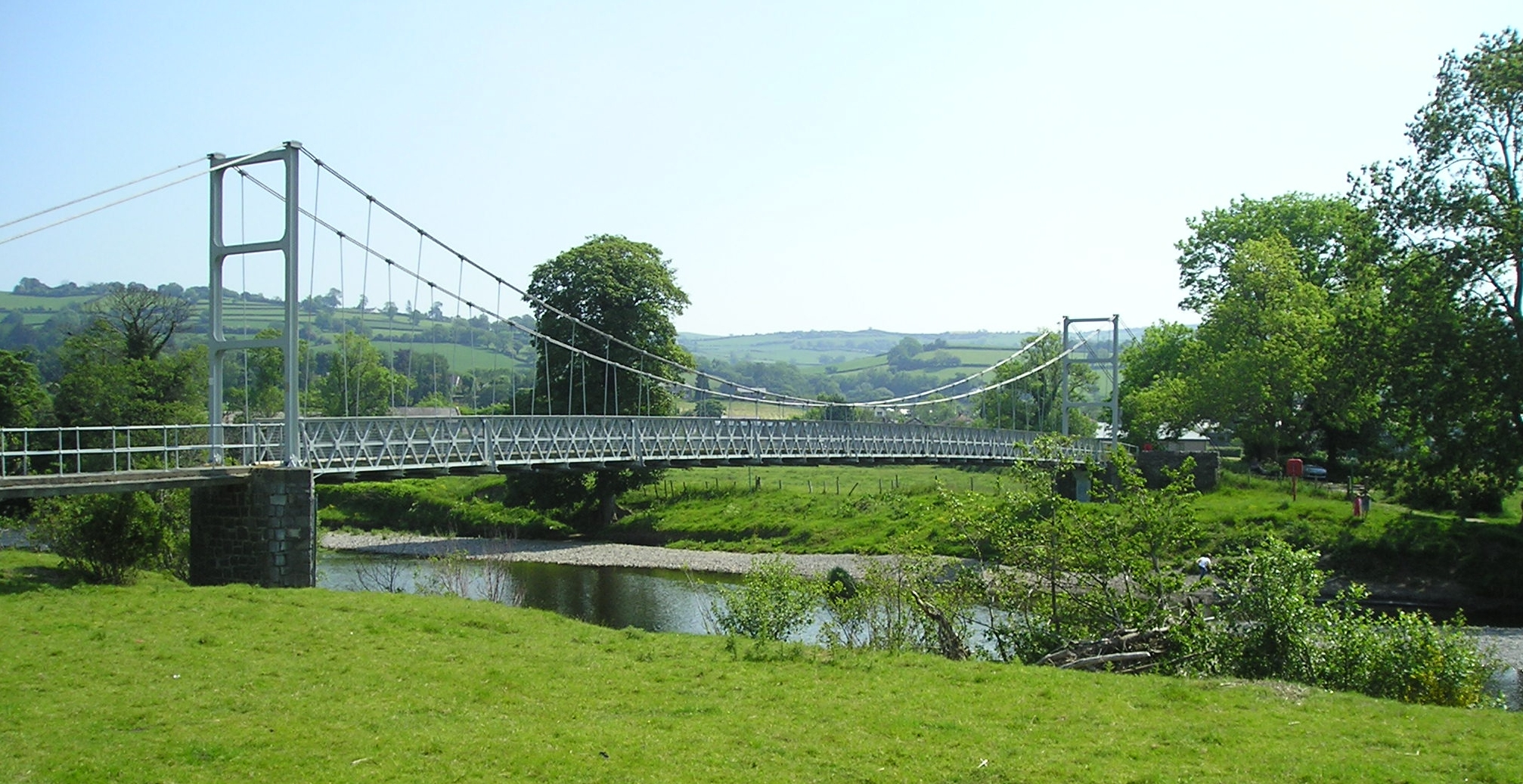
The Gower footbridge and path linking North Llanrwst station with Trefriw

The village of Trefriw (noted for its spa, first used by the Romans), is still served by the station by way of the Gower suspension footbridge over the River Conwy, a rural walk of about one mile.

Llanrwst has a second railway station, located more centrally in the town, and this was opened on 29 July 1989; to allow the new station to take the name Llanrwst, this station was renamed Llanrwst North on the same day; it has since been amended to North Llanrwst.

== Services ==
Six trains call in both directions on request Mon-Sat (approximately every three hours), with four trains each way on Sundays.

In March 2019, however, services were suspended and replaced by buses due to major flood damage to the track and formation at multiple locations on the line caused by Storm Gareth on 16 March 2019. Repairs took several months to complete, and services resumed on 18 July 2019, ahead of the 2019 National Eisteddfod which was being staged in Llanrwst. Additional trains were provided for the Eisteddfod, terminating at North Llanrwst, and a special steam charter was run to celebrate the line's re-opening. Further storm damage to the north (this time from Storm Ciara) in February 2020 resulted in services again being suspended until the line was reopened on 28 September 2020.

Preceding station	National Rail	Following station
Dolgarrog	Transport for Wales Rail; Conwy Valley line	Llanrwst
