= Dolgarrog railway station =

Railway station in Conwy, Wales

Dolgarrog
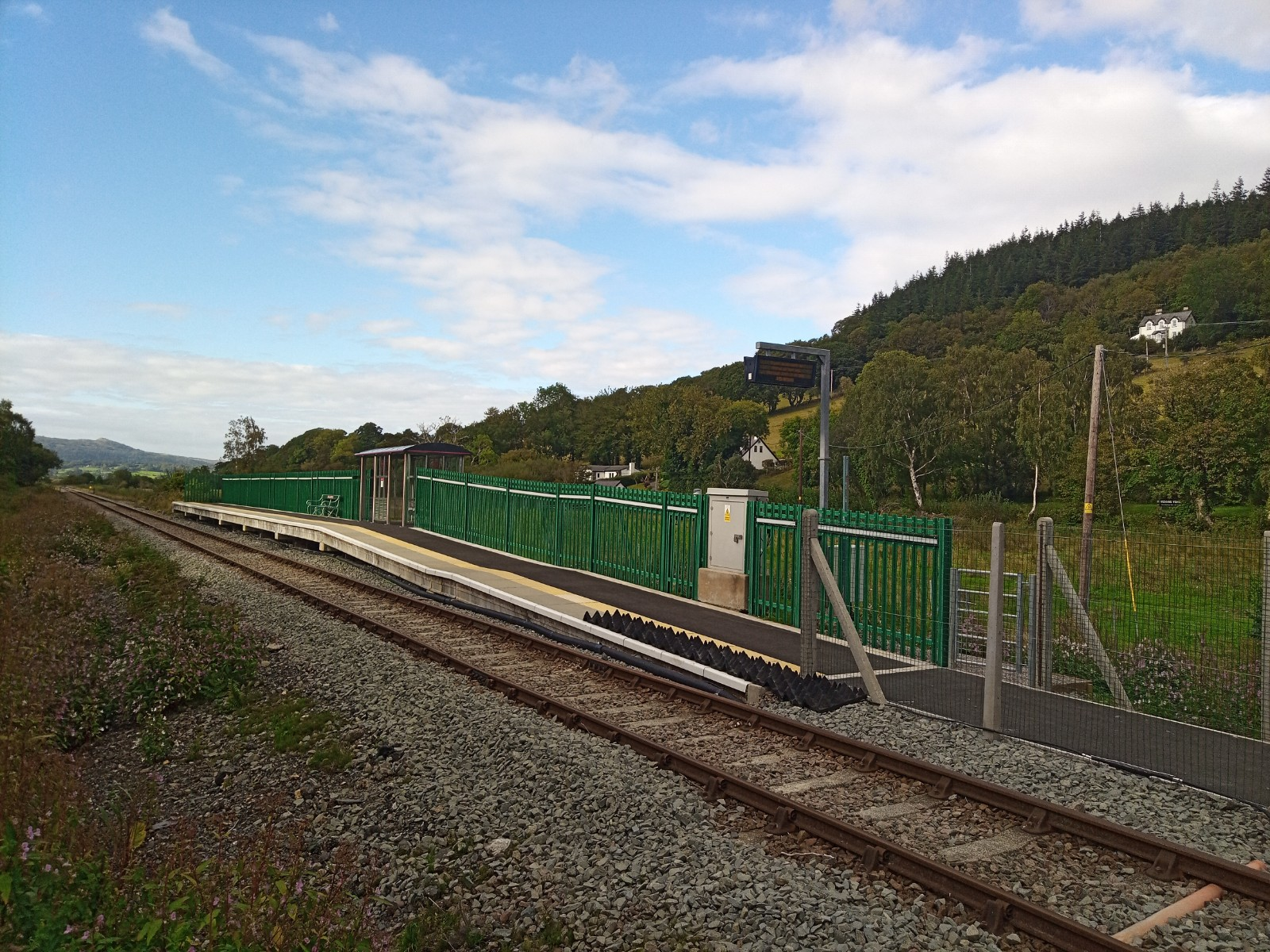
- Dolgarrog station platform in 2020

General information
- Location: Dolgarrog, Conwy; Wales
- Coordinates: 53.186°N 3.823°W
- Grid reference: SH782670
- Manager: Transport for Wales Rail
- Platforms: 1

Other information
- Station code: DLG
- Classification: DfT category F2

History
- Opened: 18 October 1916

Passengers
- 2021/22: ▲778
- 2022/23: ▼634
- 2023/24: ▲2,060
- 2024/25: ▲3,588
- 2025/26: ▼3,352
Location
Notes
- Passenger statistics from the Office of Rail and Road

Dolgarrog railway station is an unstaffed station on the Conwy Valley Line from Llandudno Junction to Blaenau Ffestiniog which serves the village of Dolgarrog. It is located between Tal-y-Cafn and North Llanwrst, 8 miles 12 chains (13.1 km).

== History ==
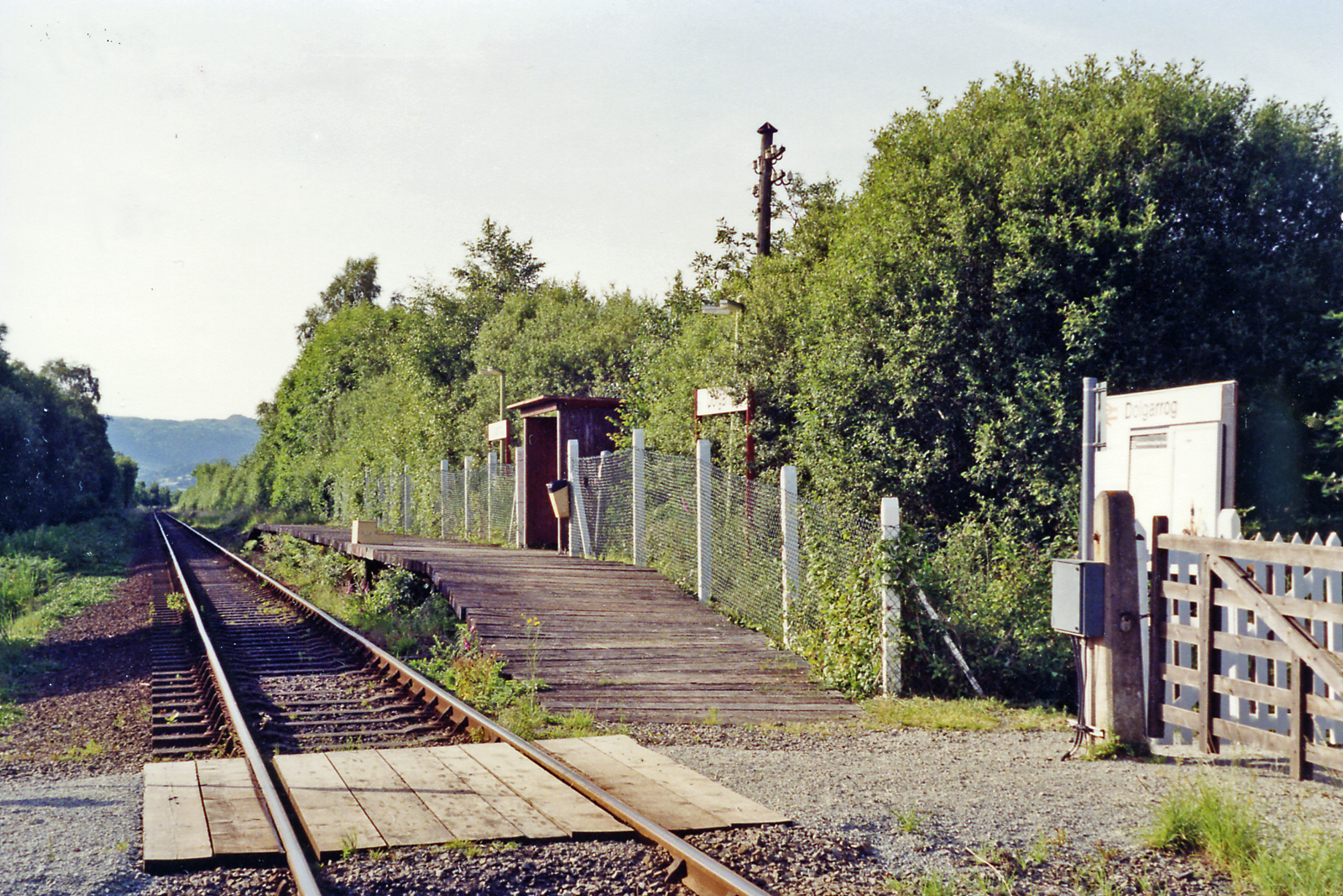
The station seen in 1992

Although the line through the station was opened in 1863, the station opened much later, on 18 December 1916, to provide sidings and an interchange facility with the Dolgarrog Railway, a short-standard gauge industrial line, built by the Aluminium Corporation to serve Dolgarrog village and the former aluminium works. The works closed in 2007 and were demolished in 2009. The Dolgarrog Railway Society is a volunteer team set up at the former aluminium works to restore the former trackbed.

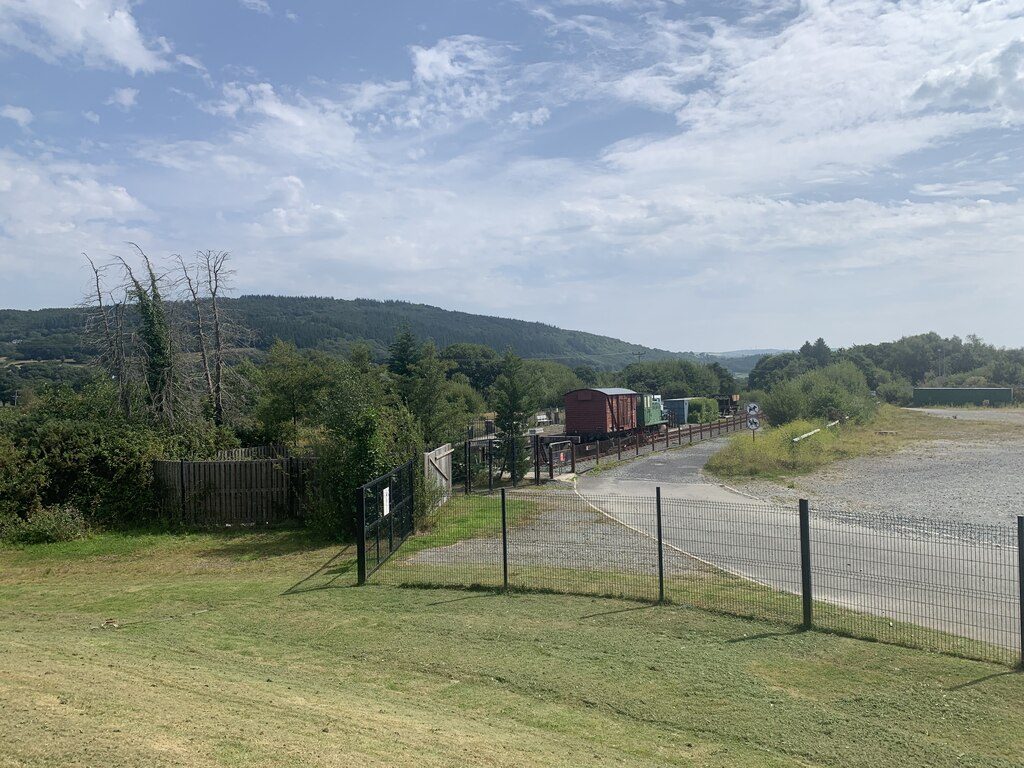
The site of the Dolgarrog Railway Society, at the former aluminium works

The line closed in 1960, with the station closing on 26 October of that year, but was reopened on 14 June 1965.

Following serious flood damage to the line in multiple locations in March 2019, services from this station were suspended for four months and replaced by buses whilst major infrastructure repairs were carried out. Dolgarrog was one of two stations severely damaged by the floodwaters. The damaged platform was removed and the line reopened to traffic on 18 July 2019, but the station remained closed. On 22 November 2019, the line closed again for three weeks for a new platform to be built at Dolgarrog and rock bolts to be installed in Ffestiniog Tunnel, reopening on 15 December. Further damage to the line occurred in February 2020, this time by Storm Ciara with services again being suspended until the line was reopened on 28 September 2020.

== Facilities ==
The station is unstaffed and has a single platform, with basic amenities only (waiting shelter and timetable poster board). It also has a digital CIS display like other stations on the branch. Access to the platform is via a foot crossing and path from the A470 road. As there are no facilities to purchase tickets, passengers must buy one in advance, or from the guard on the train.

The footbridge to the station, previously used as a rail link to an industrial site, and the only way to reach the station from the village of Dolgarrog, was previously slated for closure but has remained open.

== Passenger volume ==
The station became the least used station in Wales for the period 2017–18, mainly due to Sugar Loaf increasing its usage by more than sevenfold from the previous year. The previous low usage for Sugar Loaf, 228 passengers for 2016–17, seems to have made it popular. It saw over 1,800 passengers for 2017–18, whilst Dolgarrog saw a fall of almost 40% passenger usage to 612.

Passenger volume at Dolgarrog
	2004–05	2005–06	2006–07	2007–08	2008–09	2009–10	2010–11	2011–12	2012–13	2013–14	2014–15	2015–16	2016–17	2017–18	2018–19	2019–20	2020–21	2021–22	2022–23	2023–24	2024–25
Entries and exits	992	1,424	1,106	840	664	382	472	612	508	828	1,506	1,474	1,002	612	826	362	102	778	634	2,060	3,588

The statistics cover twelve month periods that start in April.

== Services ==
Transport for Wales Rail operates five southbound and six northbound trains that call on request Mon-Sat (approximately every three hours), with three trains each way on Sundays between May and early September. The station is a request stop, so passengers wishing to alight must inform the guard, and passengers wishing to board must signal to the driver.

Preceding station	National Rail	Following station
Tal-y-Cafn	Transport for Wales Conwy Valley Line	North Llanrwst

== Bibliography ==
- Baughan, Peter. E. (1980). A Regional History of the Railways of Great Britain. Vol. 11 North and Mid Wales. Newton Abbot: David & Charles. ISBN 0-7153-7850-3.
- Jones, Eric; Gwyn, David (1989). Dolgarrog, an Industrial History. Gwynedd Archives. ISBN 0-901337-50-1.
- Mitchell, Vic; Smith, Keith (2010). Bala to Llandudno. West Sussex: Middleton Press. fig. 92. ISBN 9781906008871. OCLC 668198724.
- Quick, Michael (2023). Railway Passenger Stations in Great Britain: A Chronology (PDF) (5th ed.). London: Railway and Canal Historical Society.
- Wills, Dixe (2014). Tiny Stations (Paperback, 1st reprint ed.). Basingstoke: AA Publishing. ISBN 978-0-7495-7732-2.
