= Llandudno railway station =

Railway station in Conwy, Wales

Llandudno
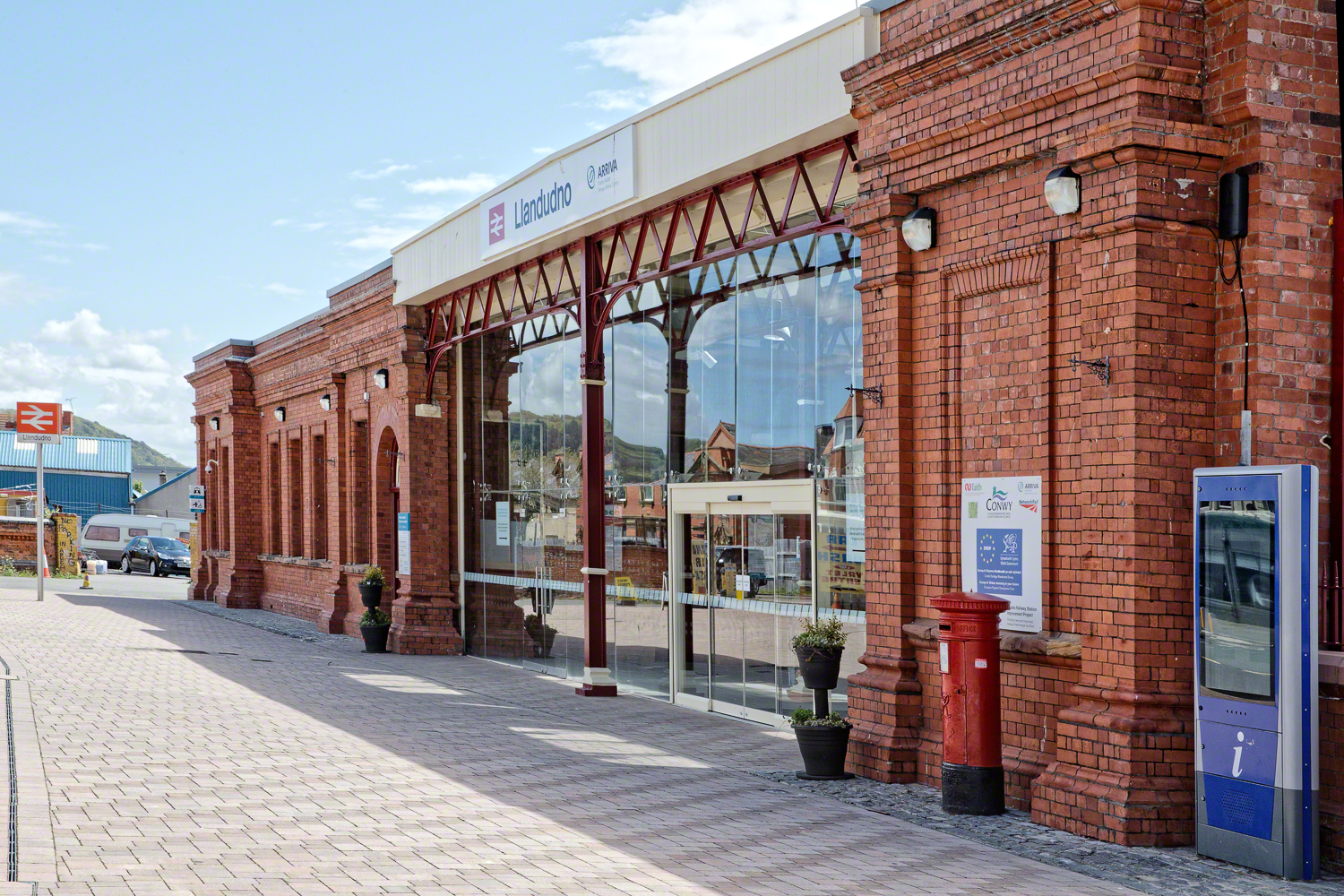
- Station entrance

General information
- Location: Llandudno, Conwy County Borough; Wales
- Coordinates: 53.321°N 3.827°W
- Grid reference: SH783819
- Manager: Transport for Wales Rail
- Platforms: 3

Other information
- Station code: LLD
- Classification: DfT category E

History
- Opened: October 1858

Passengers
- 2020/21: ▼65,208
- 2021/22: ▲0.240 million
- 2022/23: ▲0.322 million
- 2023/24: ▲0.397 million
- 2024/25: ▲0.456 million
Location
Notes
- Passenger statistics from the Office of Rail and Road

Llandudno railway station serves the seaside town of Llandudno in North Wales. It is the terminus of a 3 miles (4.8 km) long branch line from Llandudno Junction on the North Wales Coast Line, between Crewe and Holyhead. The station is managed by Transport for Wales Rail, who operate all trains serving it. Llandudno Victoria station, the lower terminus of the Great Orme Tramway, is a 15-minute walk from the main railway station.

== History ==
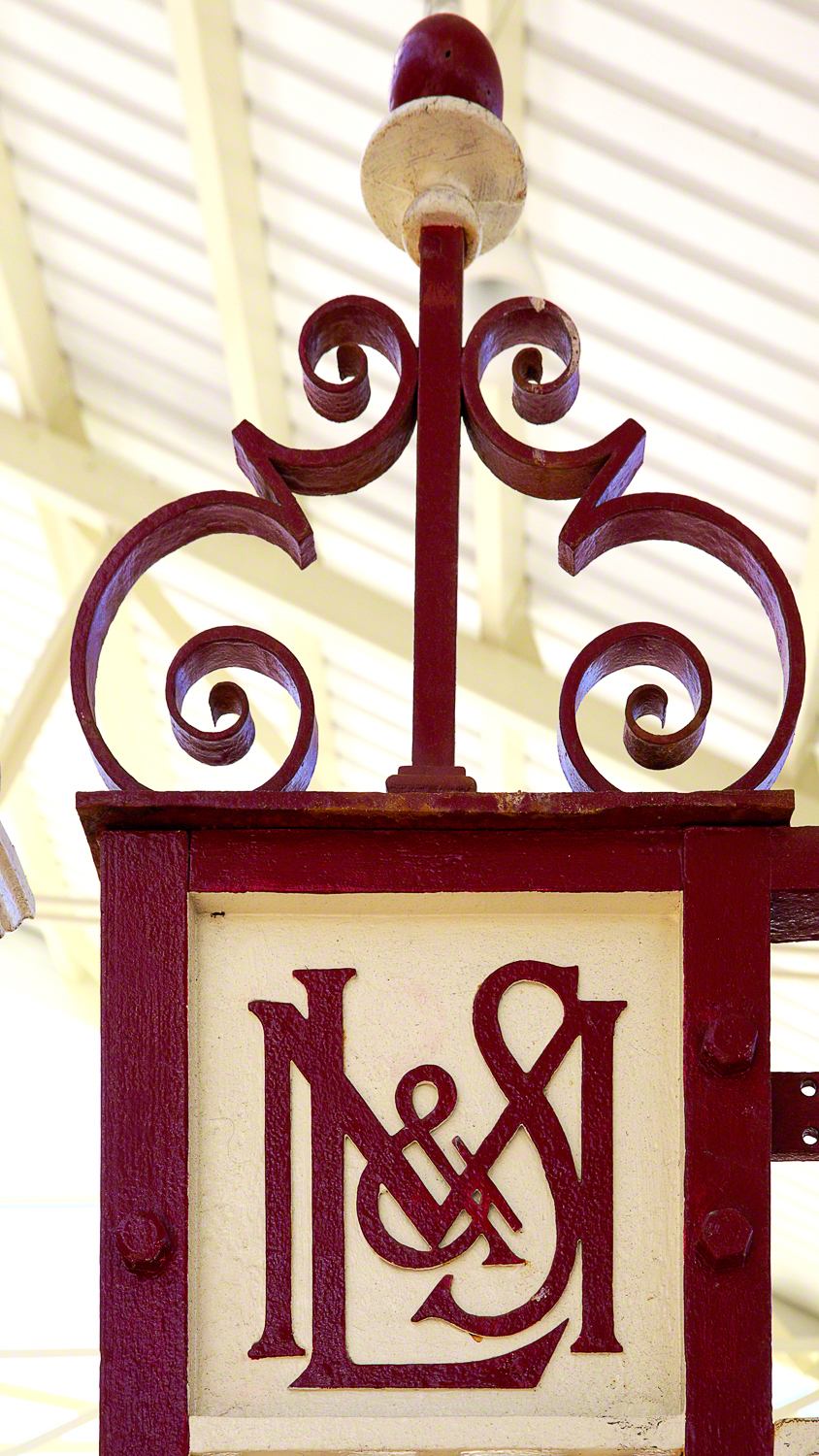
London Midland & Scottish Railway monogram

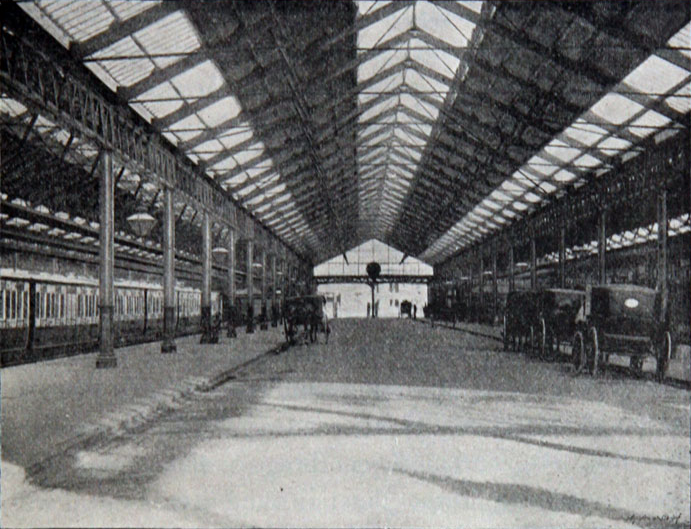
Llandudno railway station pictured in 1894

The first station and the Llandudno branch line was constructed by the St. George's Harbour and Railway Company and opened on 1 October 1858. The trains at first ran to and from Conwy station until the completion of Llandudno Junction station. The line was soon absorbed by the London and North Western Railway, which in turn became part of the London, Midland and Scottish Railway in 1923. Vaughan Street in Llandudno was also laid out in 1858 as the station approach road.

As the first station had become inadequate to cope with increasing usage, the present Llandudno station buildings and frontage, together with five platforms and an extensive glass roof, were erected in 1892; the station still has the Victorian carriage road between the two principal platforms. Platforms 4 and 5 had been disused since 1978, with the tracks to the platforms being disconnected and eventually dismantled in 2012. The southernmost half of the glass roof was removed some decades ago and the remainder was substantially cut back again in 1990. Half of the station frontage (including the former waiting and refreshment rooms), which had been disused for many years, was demolished in May 2009. The station retains its semaphore signalling and manual signal box.

Virgin Trains West Coast previously ran a direct afternoon service to London Euston, but this service was discontinued at the December 2008 timetable change; it now terminates at Chester instead. However, Avanti West Coast intend to reintroduce this service, though only in the summer months.

== Facilities ==
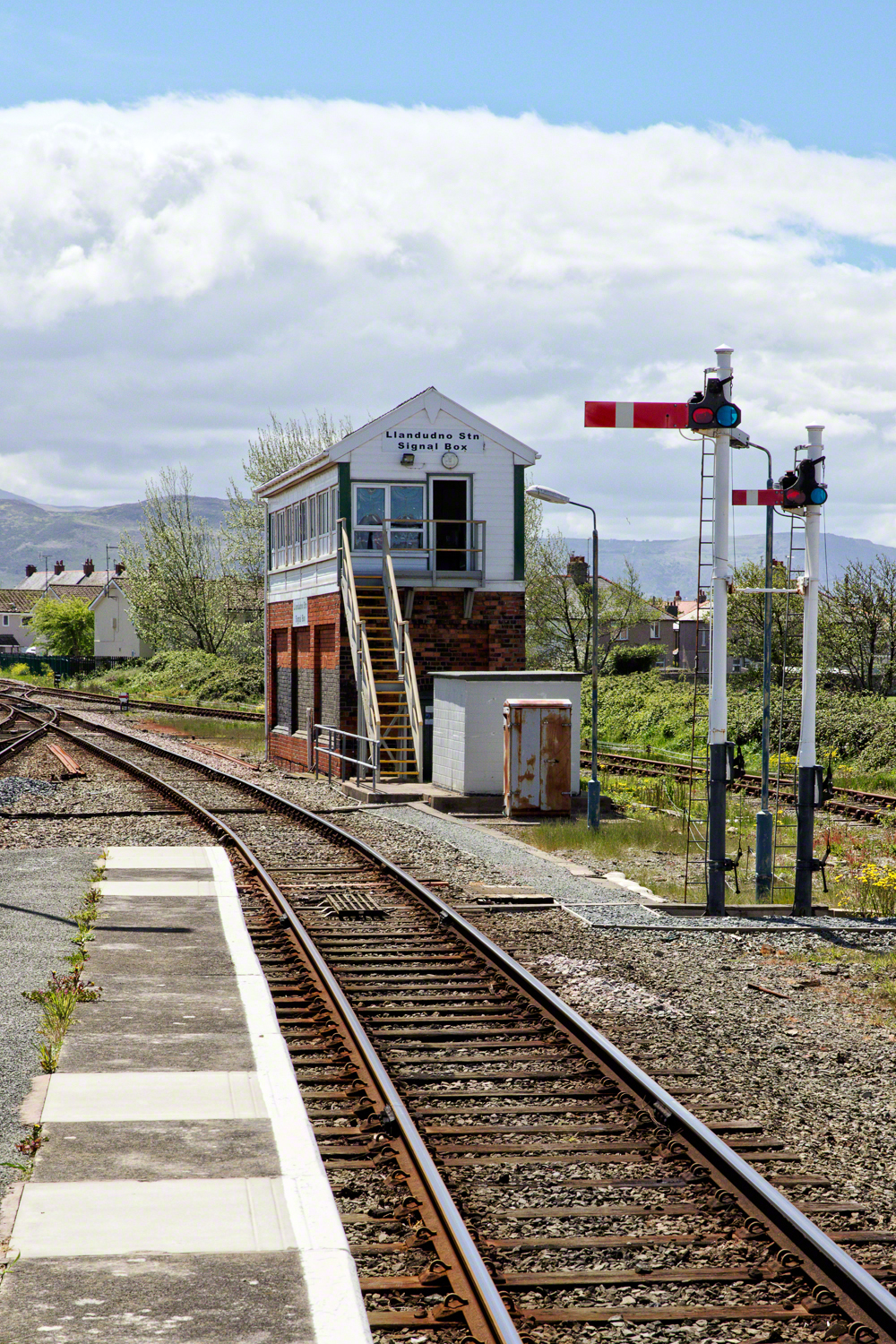
Signal Box

In the 2000s, plans were unveiled for the transformation of the station into a Transport Interchange, which would involve the demolition of the disused part of the frontage and the introduction of new passenger facilities. Following the provision of funding, reconstruction began in 2013 and the £5.2 million scheme was completed in the summer of 2014. The work included a 130-space car park (on the site of the former platforms 4 and 5), a glazed concourse, a bus interchange, new taxi rank, and a shop/cafe. There are also a new entrance and improvements to the platforms.

The ticket office is staffed on a part-time basis. A self-service ticket machine is also provided for use and for collecting advance purchase tickets. There are also toilets and a waiting room on the concourse. Train running information is provided by digital information screens, posters and automated announcements. Step-free access is available to all platforms.

== Services ==
All services at Llandudno station are operated by Transport for Wales Rail.

The standard daily service is:

- An hourly service to Liverpool Lime Street via Colwyn Bay, Rhyl, Prestatyn, Flint, Chester and Liverpool South Parkway. Two daily services on this route (including the last train each evening) run to Crewe rather than Liverpool. The destination for these trains altered from Manchester Airport at the May 2026 timetable change.
- An hourly shuttle to Llandudno Junction, which connects with services to Bangor, Holyhead, Birmingham New Street, Manchester Airport, London Euston and South Wales
- One weekday evening direct service to Birmingham New Street
- Five trains per day along the Conwy Valley line, serving Llanrwst, Betws-y-Coed and Blaenau Ffestiniog.

On Sundays, there is the following service:

- An approximately half-hourly shuttle service to Llandudno Junction until mid-evening, plus a single later trip;
- Three trains a day run down the Conwy Valley line to Blaenau Ffestiniog.

Preceding station	National Rail	Following station
Terminus	Transport for Wales Rail; Conwy Valley Line	Deganwy
Terminus	Transport for Wales Rail; North Wales Coast Line	Deganwy
