= Llandudno Junction TMD =

Former railway maintenance depot in Llandudno, Wales

- Interactive map of Llandudno Junction TMD

Location
- Location: Llandudno, Conwy, Wales
- Coordinates: 53.2812°N 3.808°W
- OS grid: SH795775

Characteristics
- Owner: Transport for Wales
- Depot code: LJ (1973 – 2000)
- Type: DMU, Diesel

History
- Opened: 1899
- Closed: 1966

Llandudno Junction TMD was a traction maintenance depot located in Llandudno, Conwy, Wales. The depot was situated on the Conwy Valley Line and was near Llandudno Junction railway station.

== History ==
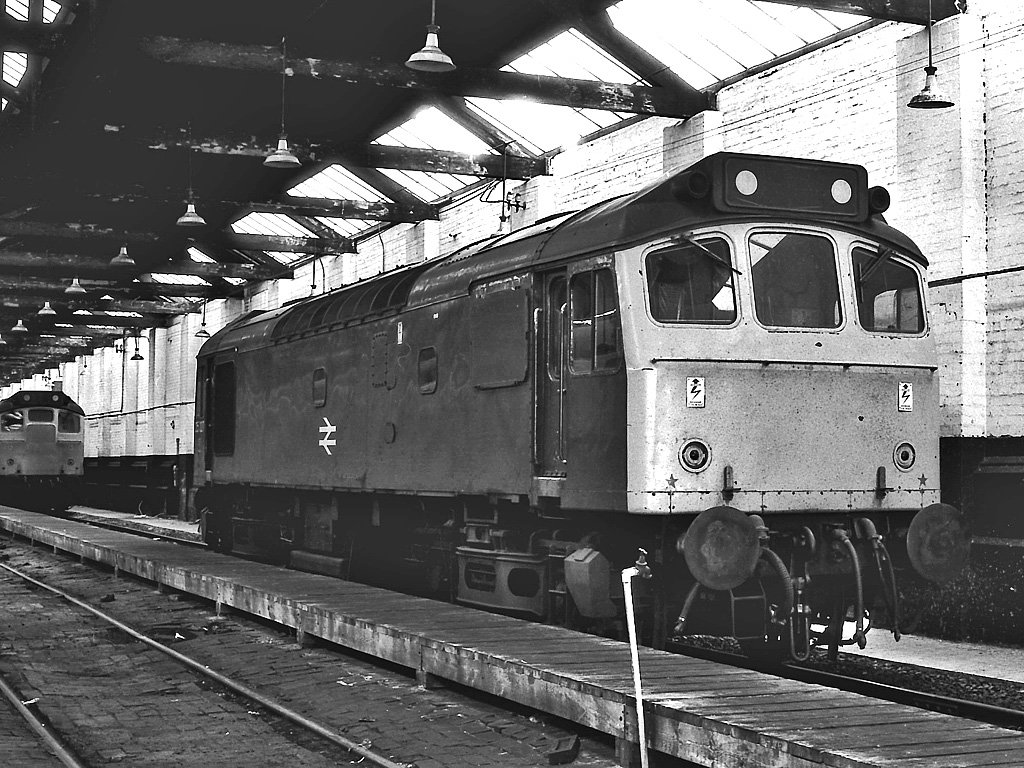
Class 25 diesel-electric locomotives inside Llandudno Junction carriage shed, 1982.

Before its closure in 1966, Class 05, 08 and 11 shunters could be seen at the depot. Class 153 DMUs were also stored here before the depot's demolition in 2000.

After re-development of the site, the local authority named a road crossing the area as "Ffordd 6G Road". Probably the only street in the UK named after a BR shed code.
