= DGY =

DGY may refer to:

- DGY, the Chapman code for Dumfries and Galloway, Scotland from 1975 to 1996
- DGY, the National Rail station code for Deganwy railway station, Wales
