= Dolgarrog Railway =

Former industrial railway in Wales

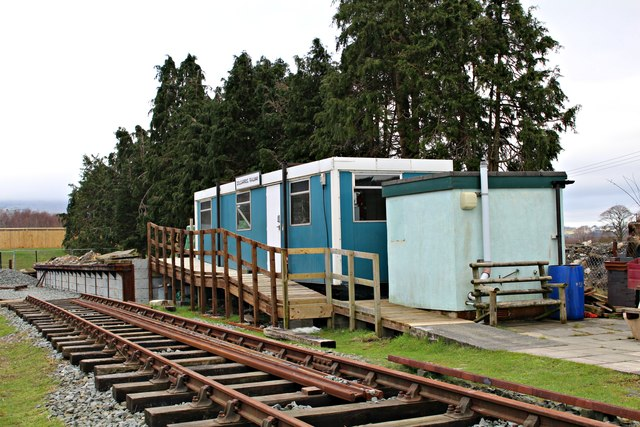
- The station at Dolgarrog Aluminium Works, under construction in 2016.
- Terminus: Dolgarrog Aluminium Works
- Coordinates: 53.188800°N 3.83675°W
- Connections: Conwy Valley Line

Commercial operations
- Built by: Dolgarrog Aluminium
- Original gauge: Standard gauge

Preserved operations
- Stations: 2
- Length: 1/2-mile

Commercial history
- Opened: 1916

The Dolgarrog Railway was a half-mile-long standard-gauge industrial railway, in Dolgarrog, Conwy County Borough, Wales. It ran between Dolgarrog station and the Dolgarrog Aluminium Works, joining the LNWR Conwy Valley Line at a sidings near Dolgarrog station.

== History ==
In 1916, a standard-gauge railway was built, connecting the aluminium works to the Conwy Valley Line, then run by the London and North Western Railway (LNWR). A station at Dolgarrog was built on the Conwy Valley Line to provide sidings and an interchange with the line to the aluminium works. The line was used to transport materials to the works, aluminium from the works, and workers to and from Dolgarrog.

After World War II, the railway was dismantled as transportation by road took over.

== Restoration ==
In 2010, the Dolgarrog Railway Society laid the first pieces of track to restore the line as a heritage railway. The first section of track was opened on 13 August 2011.

=== Restored rolling stock ===
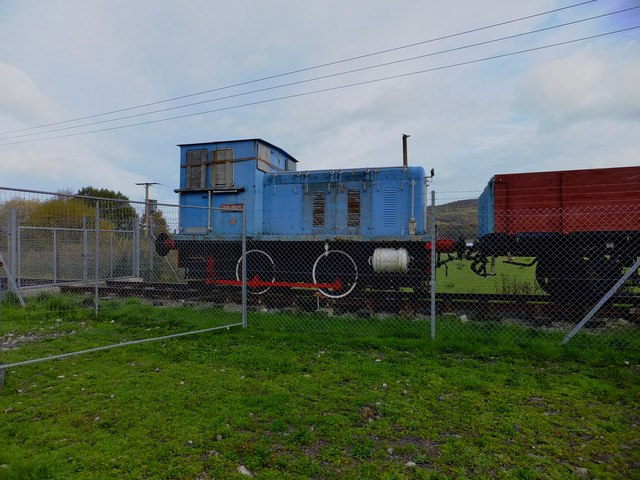
Taurus, a restored diesel locomotive

The Dolgarrog Railway Society have restored a diesel locomotive, Taurus, to be used at the site.
