= Llanrwst railway station =

Railway station in Conwy, Wales

Llanrwst
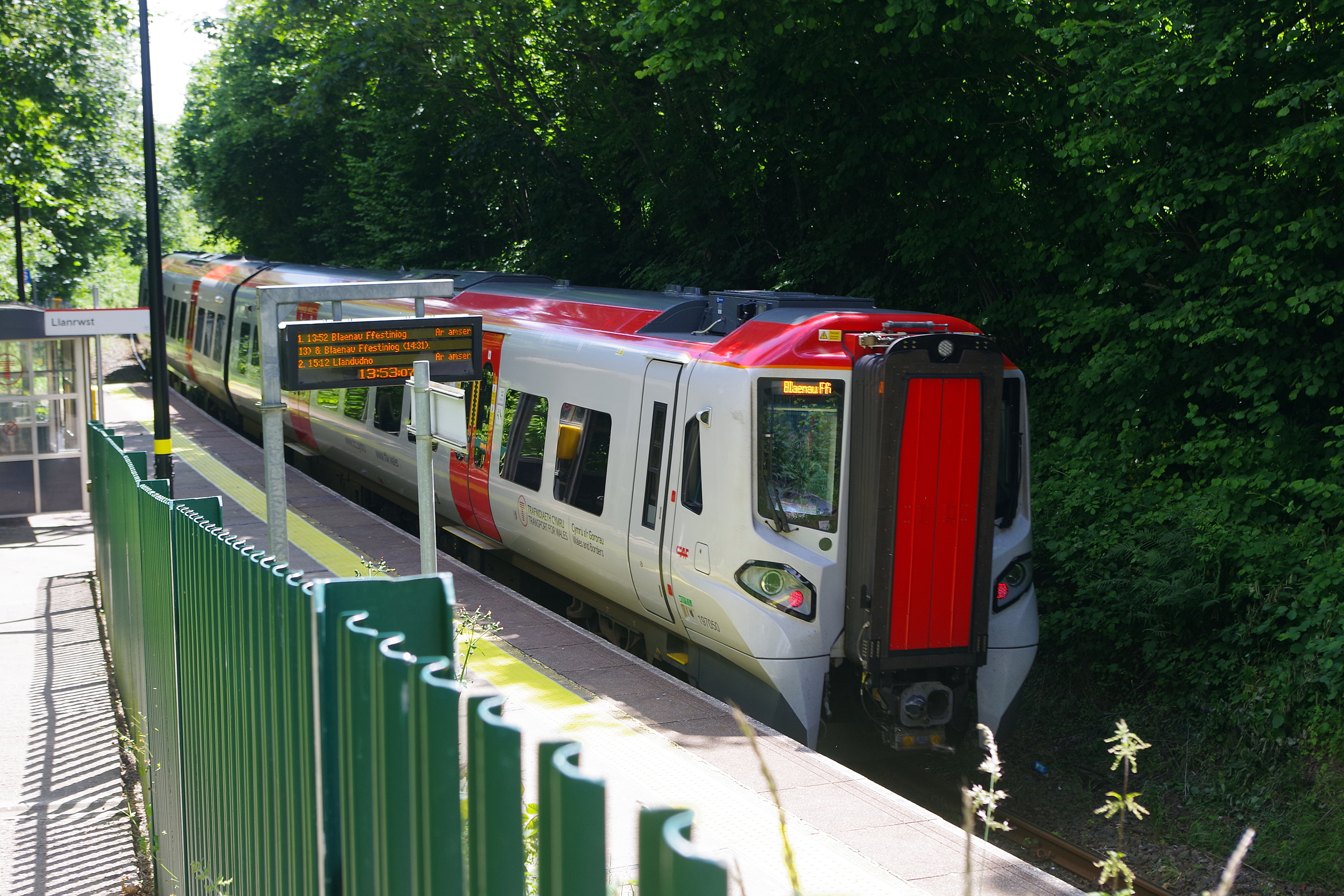
- Llanrwst railway station in 2024

General information
- Location: Llanrwst, Conwy; Wales
- Coordinates: 53.139°N 3.795°W
- Grid reference: SH800616
- Manager: Transport for Wales Rail
- Platforms: 1

Other information
- Station code: LWR
- Classification: DfT category F2

Passengers
- 2021/22: ▲8,550
- 2022/23: ▲14,620
- 2023/24: ▲20,896
- 2024/25: ▲27,604
- 2025/26: ▲28,778
Location
Notes
- Passenger statistics from the Office of Rail and Road

Llanrwst railway station is in Denbigh Street near the centre of the market town of Llanrwst, Wales, and close to the local bus termini in Watling Street. It is situated on the Conwy Valley Line from Llandudno Junction to Blaenau Ffestiniog 12 miles (19 km) south of the former and was opened by British Rail in 1989. The town's original station (opened in 1863) 1/2 mile (0.80 km) to the north is now called North Llanrwst.

== Facilities ==
The station here is unstaffed and has the same basic amenities seen at others on the line - a waiting shelter, timetable poster boards and digital information screen. Tickets must be bought on the train or prior to travel. Step-free access to the platform is available via a ramp from the main road.

== Services ==
Six trains call each way on Mon-Sat (approximately every three hours), with four trains each way on Sundays. All services from here were suspended following major flood damage to the track and other infrastructure in the area by the River Conwy as a result of Storm Gareth on 16 March 2019. A replacement bus service operated, with repairs expected to take several months to complete. The line reopened northwards to Llandudno on 18 July 2019, ahead of the staging of the National Eisteddfod in the town; the remainder followed from 24 July. Further damage to the line caused by flooding from Storm Ciara forced the closure of the route again on 8 February 2020; following repairs costing £2.2m. The line reopened on 28 September 2020.

Preceding station	National Rail	Following station
North Llanrwst	Transport for Wales Rail; Conwy Valley Line	Betws-y-Coed
