= Deganwy railway station =

Railway station in Conwy, Wales

Deganwy
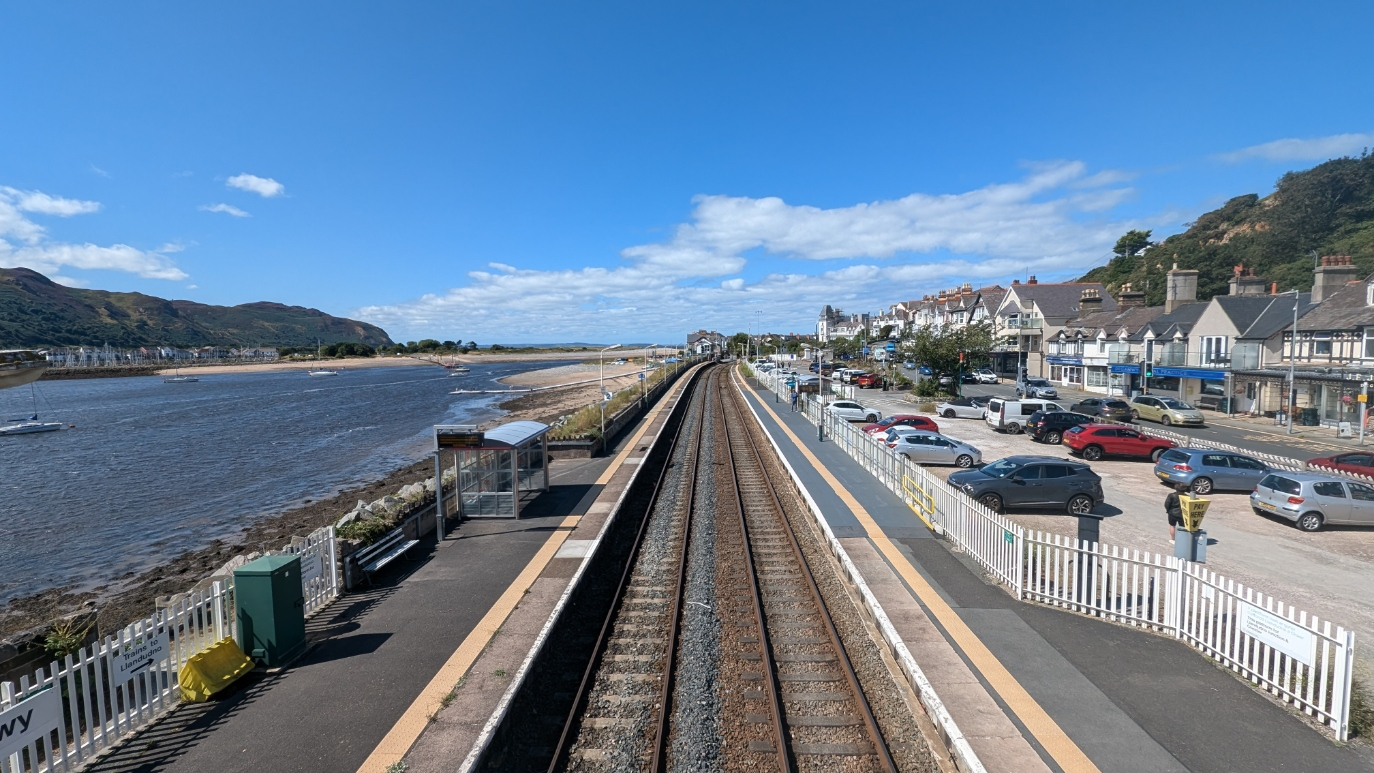
- Deganwy station from the footbridge pictured in August 2024

General information
- Location: Deganwy, Conwy; Wales
- Coordinates: 53.295°N 3.833°W
- Grid reference: SH779790
- Manager: Transport for Wales Rail
- Platforms: 2

Other information
- Station code: DGY
- Classification: DfT category F2

Key dates
- 1866: Opened

Passengers
- 2021/22: ▲9,926
- 2022/23: ▲15,086
- 2023/24: ▲19,518
- 2024/25: ▲24,334
- 2025/26: ▲29,288
Location
Notes
- Passenger statistics from the Office of Rail and Road

Deganwy railway station serves the town of Deganwy, Wales, and is the only intermediate station located on the Llandudno branch line from Llandudno Junction (on the North Wales Coast Line from Crewe to Holyhead) to Llandudno.

== History ==
The station was built by the London and North Western Railway in 1866 together with adjacent wharfs on the Conwy Estuary to which it was planned to bring dressed slate from Blaenau Ffestiniog for export by sea. These wharfs have been redeveloped in the 21st century for housing and marina facilities. The station retains its signal box and semaphore signalling.

== Facilities ==
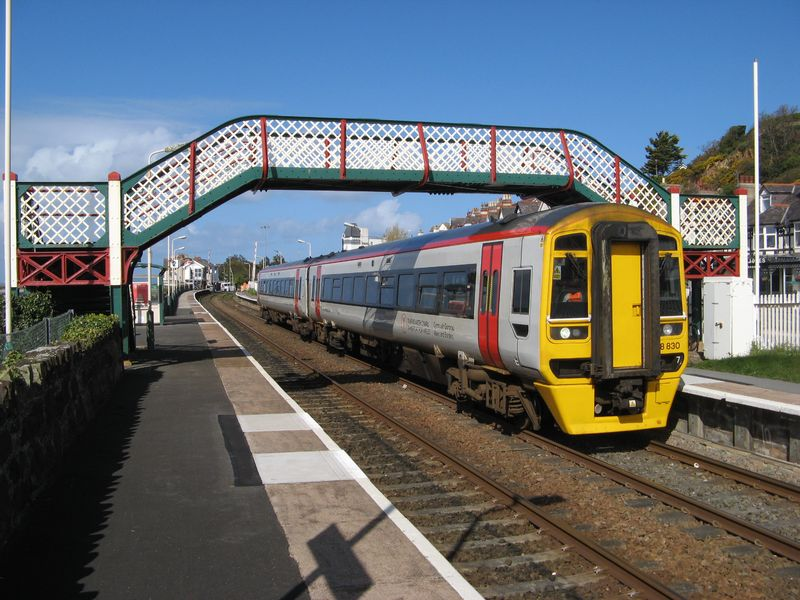
Refurbished footbridge (April 2020)

The station buildings have been demolished and replaced by small shelters but arriving passengers must still cross the line by the original footbridge, which was refurbished in 2012. No ticketing facilities are provided, so passenger must buy tickets on the train or prior to travel. Train running information is offered via timetable posters and telephone. Step-free access to both platforms is available, though this requires the use of the station level crossing for Llandudno-bound passengers.

== Services ==
There are hourly through services on weekdays to Manchester Piccadilly via Colwyn Bay, Abergele, Rhyl, Prestatyn, Flint, Shotton, Chester and Warrington

There are six trains per day running along the Conwy Valley Line calling at stations such as Llanrwst, Betws-y-coed as well as Blaenau Ffestiniog

Transport for Wales Rail also provide a regular shuttle between Llandudno, Deganwy and Llandudno Junction. Llandudno Junction serves as an interchange with good connections for services heading towards Bangor and Holyhead as well as services to Birmingham New Street, London and South Wales.

Sunday trains formerly only operated during the summer months (May timetable change until mid-September), but since the winter 2019 timetable change now run all year - these operate only as a shuttle between Llandudno & Llandudno Junction (except for three return trips over the Conwy Valley line) from 10.00am until mid-evening.

Before December 2022, Deganwy was a request stop, with trains stopping only if passengers on the train requested to alight, or by clearly signalling the driver on the platform. Since then, all services have now been booked to stop at the station by default.

Preceding station	National Rail	Following station
Llandudno	Transport for Wales Rail (Conwy Valley line) (Llandudno branch line)	Llandudno Junction
