= Llandudno Junction railway station =

Railway station in Conwy County Borough, Wales

Llandudno Junction Welsh: Cyffordd Llandudno
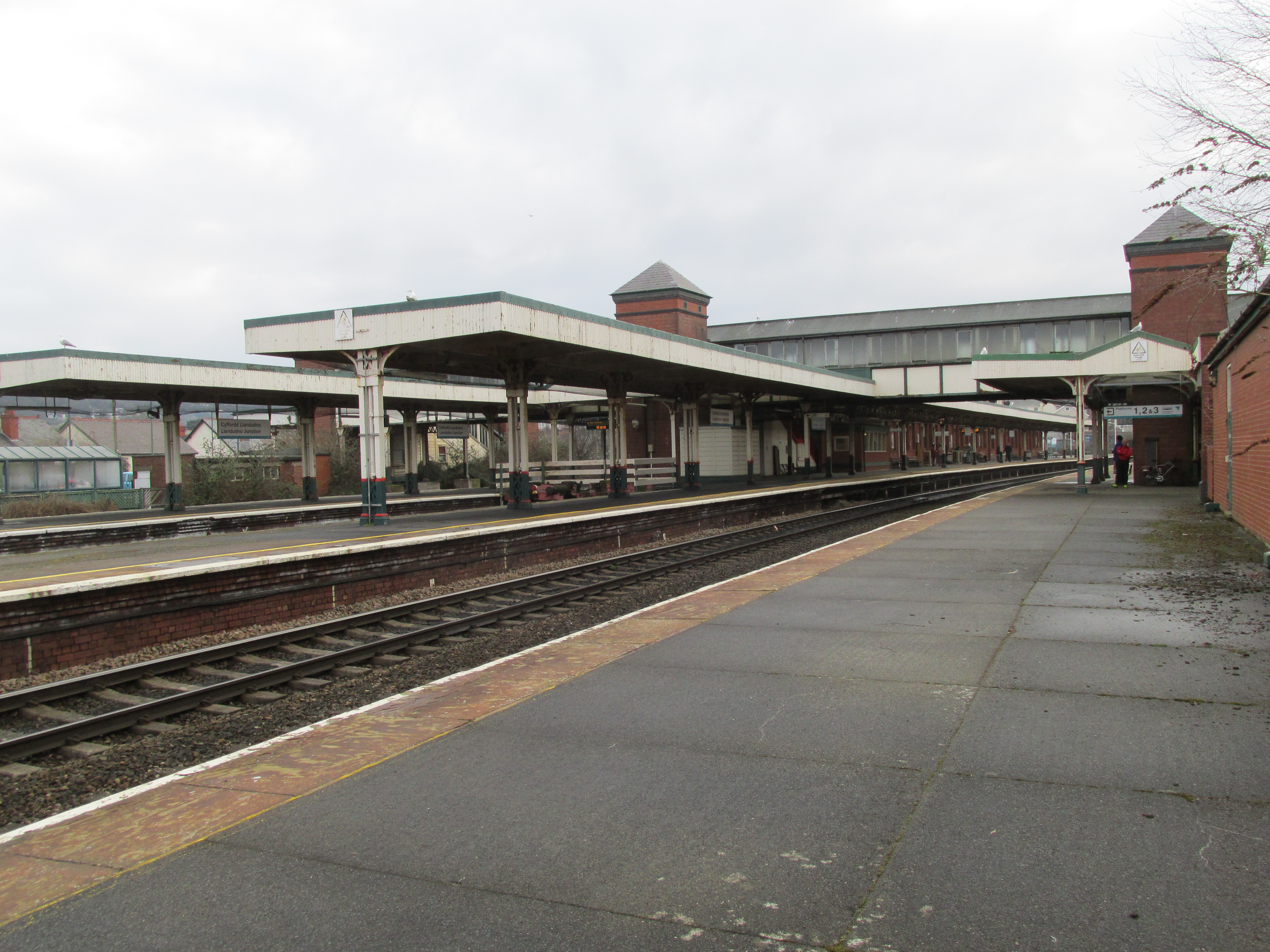
- A view of the platforms, March 2018

General information
- Location: Llandudno Junction, Conwy County Borough, Wales
- Coordinates: 53.284°N 3.809°W
- Grid reference: SH794778
- Managed by: Transport for Wales
- Platforms: 4

Other information
- Station code: LLJ
- Classification: DfT category C2

History
- Original company: Chester and Holyhead Railway
- Pre-grouping: London and North Western Railway
- Post-grouping: London Midland and Scottish Railway

Key dates
- 1 October 1858: First station opened
- 16 June 1863: Conwy Valley Line opened
- 1 October 1897: Present station opened

Passengers
- 2020/21: ▼75,342
- Interchange: ▼20,962
- 2021/22: ▲0.265 million
- Interchange: ▲87,916
- 2022/23: ▲0.297 million
- Interchange: ▲113,860
- 2023/24: ▲0.353 million
- Interchange: ▲140,972
- 2024/25: ▲0.397 million
- Interchange: ▲161,394
Location
Notes
- Passenger statistics from the Office of Rail and Road

Llandudno Junction (Welsh: Cyffordd Llandudno) is a railway station that serves the town of Llandudno Junction, in Conwy County Borough, Wales. The station is a stop on the North Wales Main Line between Crewe and Holyhead; it is also a junction for trains to Llandudno and the Conwy Valley line. It is managed by Transport for Wales, which also provides services along with Avanti West Coast.

== History ==
The original station (located to the west of the current station) was opened on 1 October 1858 and served the branch line to Llandudno. Built by the St. George's Harbour and Railway Company in 1858, this branch line heads north through Deganwy before terminating in the town. Before the completion of the junction station, the branch line trains from Llandudno ran through to Conwy.

This was followed by the opening of a second branch line in 1863 – the Conwy Valley Line – which headed south and was built by the Conway and Llanrwst Railway, and became part of the LNWR in 1867. It follows the valley of the River Conwy to Llanrwst (where it originally terminated) and Betws-y-Coed (a later terminus in 1869), then follows the Lledr Valley and a two mile long tunnel to terminate at Blaenau Ffestiniog, where passengers can join the Ffestiniog Railway.

Initially the Conwy Valley line ran into a separate platform on the south side of the station, and a refreshment room was built in 1864. But more space was needed to cope with both main line and branch-line traffic, and on 1 October 1897 the present station was opened on a much larger site, the two island platforms offering six through lines with two bays at each end (a total of four through platforms and four bay platforms). The opening of the new station allowed the demolition of the former station, but also entailed a diverting of the Conwy Valley branch, which now joined the main line some half a mile further east. The old formation was used to store locomotives.

Three of the platforms on the southern side (both bays and the down loop) were taken out of use in 1968 when the easternmost of the two signal boxes was closed and the track layout altered. In 1983 the branch junction was again moved slightly eastwards to allow a new freight terminal (now disused) to be built to replace the original goods yard and another at nearby Colwyn Bay that had been closed before the start of the A55 road widening scheme the previous year.

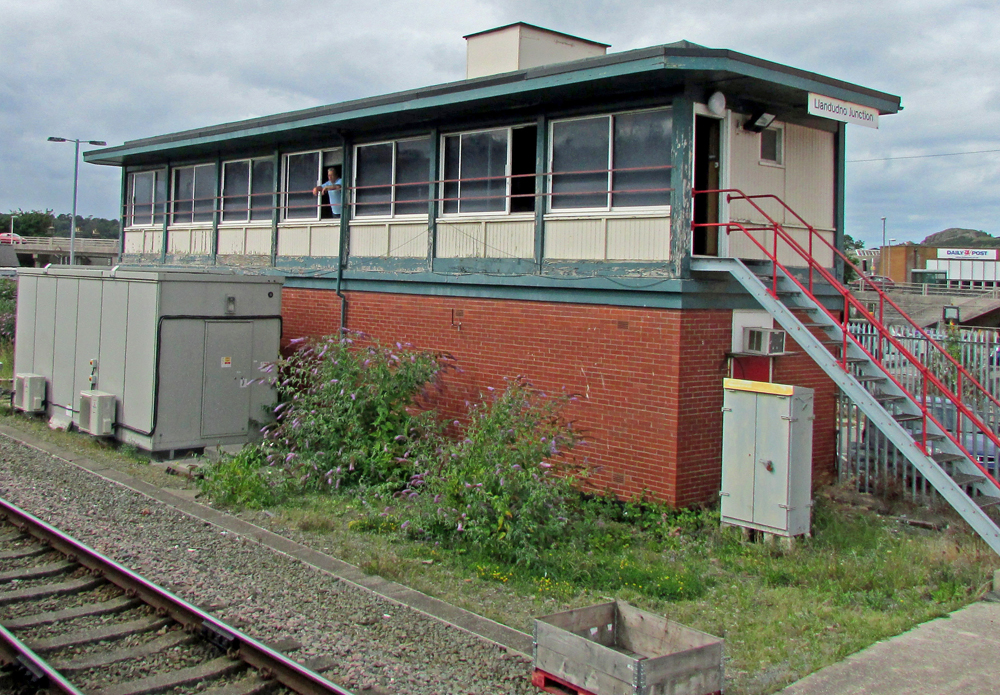
The 1985-built Llandudno Junction signal box

The station was also remodelled once more and resignalled at this time, and in 1985 a new power signal box was commissioned at the western end, which now controls the station area and junctions along with the main line between Colwyn Bay and Conwy and the northern end of the Conwy Valley branch (using the electric token system). The token machine for the branch is located at the station rather than in the signal box for operational convenience, allowing drivers to collect or return their token (with the cooperation of the signaller) whilst station work is undertaken, rather than having to make an additional stop at the box to make the exchange.

The station was also formerly the site of Llandudno Junction TMD, a motive power depot which closed in 1966. It was given the code 7A by the London, Midland and Scottish Railway, which was altered to 6G by British Railways in March 1952. This had been located just south east of the station, and its site, together with the former adjoining goods yard, now have been redeveloped, but the new flyover road across the site bears the name 6G.

== Layout ==
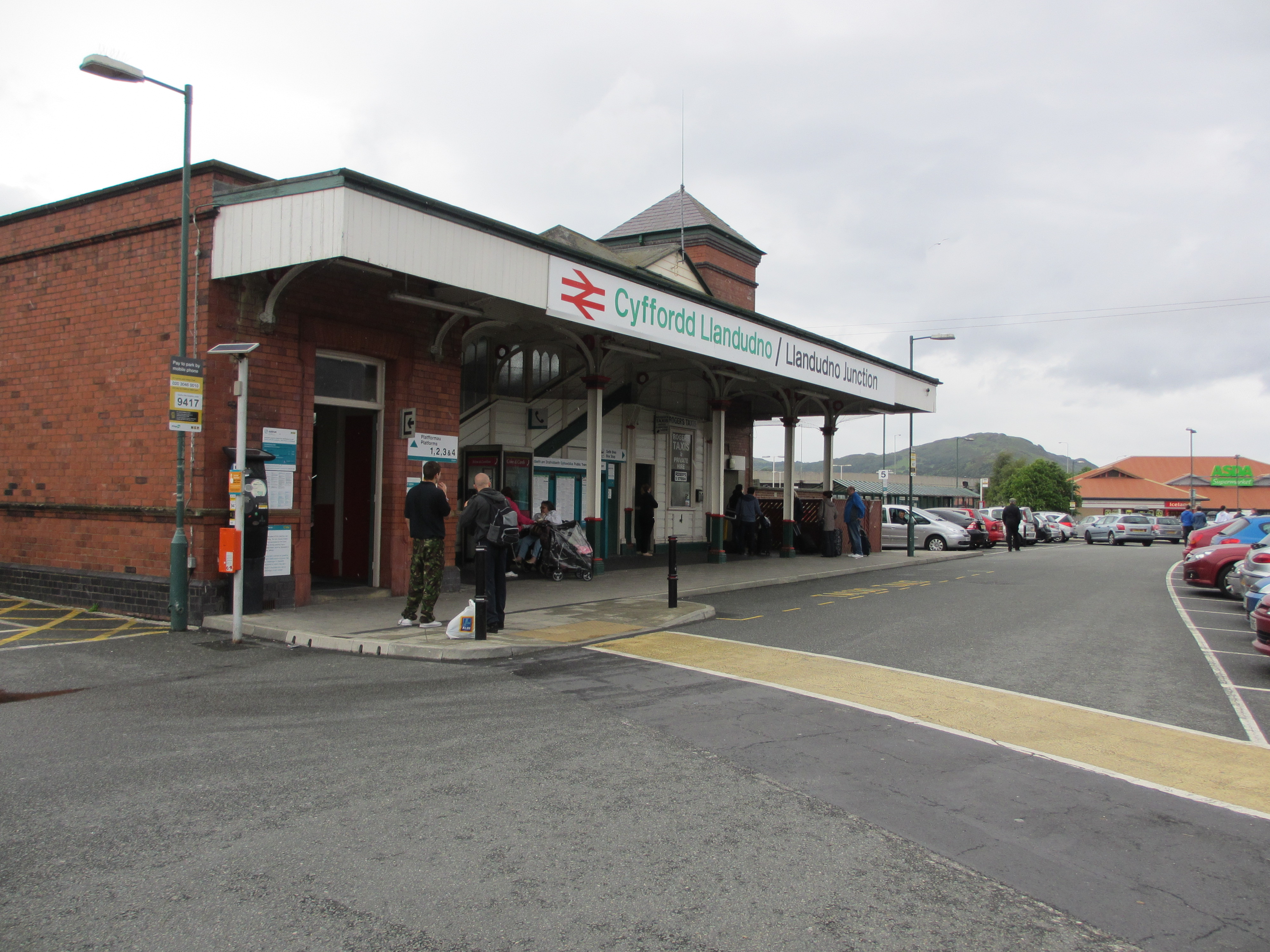
Station entrance and car park

The station currently has four operational platforms:

- Platform 1 is used by eastbound trains to Chester, Crewe, Birmingham New Street, Cardiff Central, London Euston and Blaenau Ffestiniog. It is also signalled for use by trains to Llandudno.
- Platform 2 is a bay platform used by the hourly shuttle service to Llandudno. It is also used for stabling trains overnight.
- Platform 3 is a bidirectional platform which can be used by all services. It is mainly used for westbound trains, but at busy periods can be used for eastbound trains as well.
- Platform 4 is used by services to Bangor, Holyhead and Llandudno. It is also signalled for trains to Blaenau Ffestiniog (the first branch train of the day often leaves from here).

A bus shelter in the station car park is numbered as platform 5, and is used for local bus services as well as rail replacement services when the railway is closed for engineering work.

== Facilities ==
The station is staffed throughout the day, with the ticket office on platforms 1 and 3. Self-service ticket machines are also available for general sales and for collecting pre-paid/advance purchase tickets. Other facilities on offer (all on platforms 1–3) include a waiting room, toilets, a cafe and public telephone. Platform 4 has a canopy and customer help point only. Train running information is provided by poster boards, digital information screens and automated announcements. Step-free access is available from the station entrance to all platforms via lifts integrated into the main footbridge that links them.

== Services ==
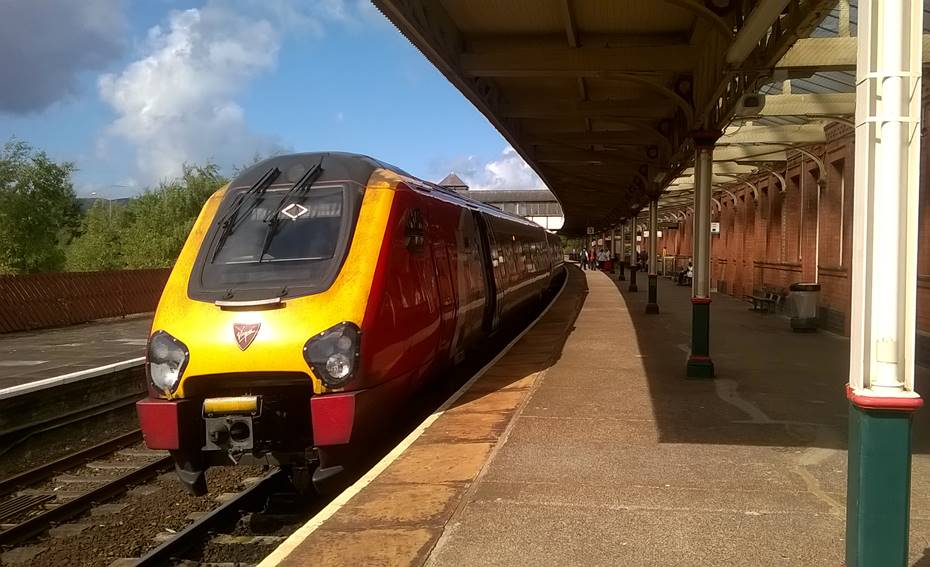
A Virgin Trains Class 221 Super Voyager at platform 3, bound for Holyhead

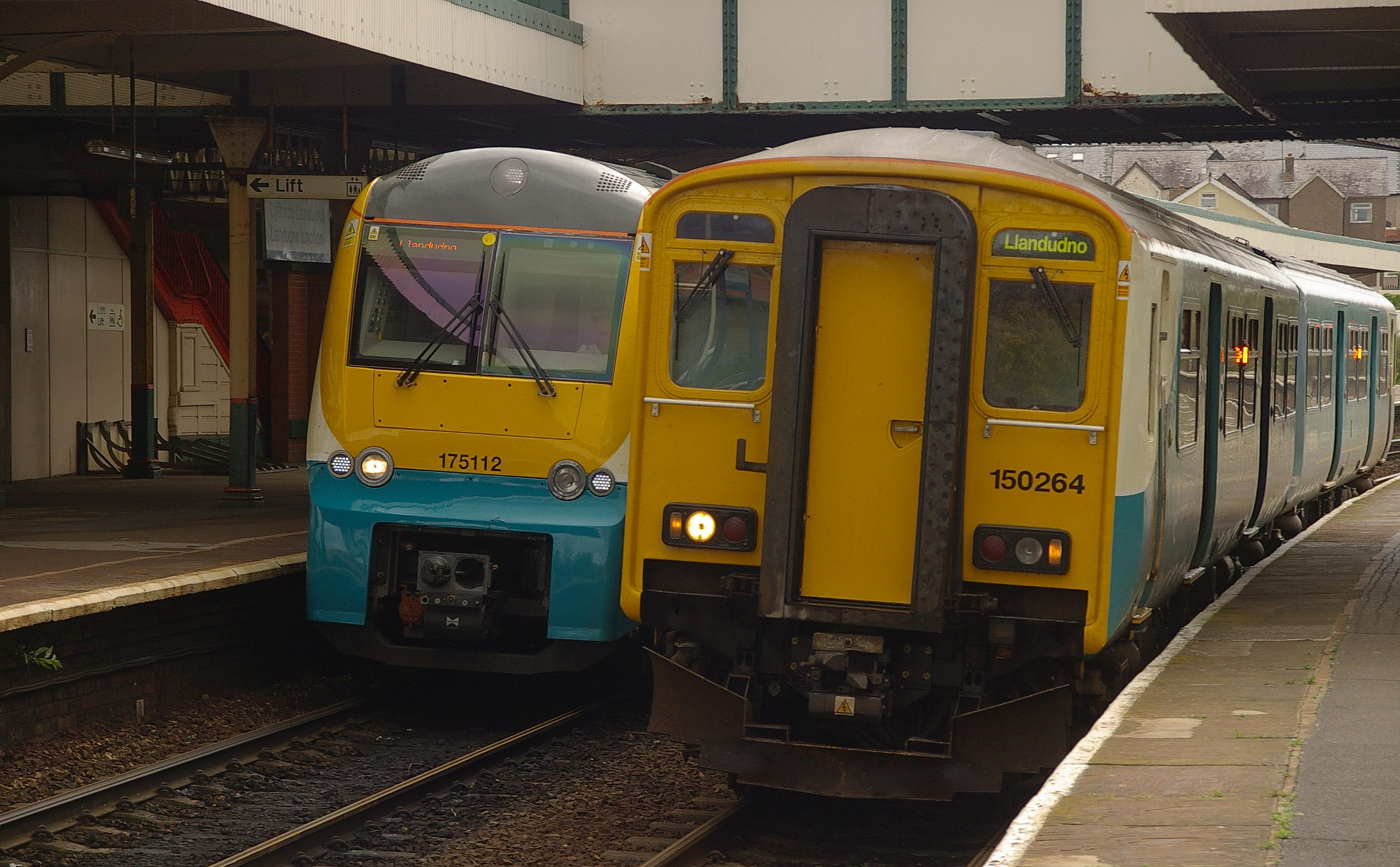
A Class 175, on a North Wales Coast Line service, passes a Class 150 on the Conwy Valley Line route

The station is served by two train operating companies:

=== Transport for Wales Rail ===
Transport for Wales Rail operates the following routes:

- An hourly service between Holyhead, Bangor, Chester, Shrewsbury and Wrexham General; services continue alternately to Birmingham International or Cardiff Central. Of these, one return journey each weekday to Cardiff is classified as a limited-stop Premier Service. Some morning and late evening trains run to/from Crewe.
- An hourly service between Llandudno, Manchester Piccadilly and Manchester Airport. A few shuttle services to Llandudno also operate at certain times of day; this runs half-hourly on Sundays.
- Six trains per day each way on the Conwy Valley Line to Blaenau Ffestiniog, with four on Sundays.

=== Avanti West Coast ===
Avanti West Coast operates four services each way to London Euston, plus a northbound only train between London and Bangor. They also operate two services per day each way between Crewe and Holyhead, plus two that run northbound only between Crewe and Bangor; one of these extends to Holyhead. One northbound service from Crewe to Holyhead starts from Birmingham New Street.

On Saturdays, there are three southbound services per day to London Euston, as well as a daily southbound service which runs between Crewe and Holyhead, while northbound, there are two trains per day to Holyhead from London Euston and two trains to Holyhead from Crewe, plus another northbound service from Crewe which terminates here.

On Sundays, are also three trains each way to London Euston, with one northbound train from Crewe to Holyhead.

Preceding station	National Rail	Following station
Colwyn Bay	Avanti West Coast London Euston–Holyhead	Bangor
Colwyn Bay	Transport for Wales Premier Service	Bangor
Colwyn Bay	Transport for Wales North Wales Coast Line	Conwy
Colwyn Bay	Transport for Wales North Wales Coast Line	Deganwy
Glan Conwy	Transport for Wales Conwy Valley line	Deganwy
