= Conway and Llanrwst Railway =

Former separate railway in north Wales

The Conway and Llanrwst Railway was a standard gauge railway built to connect the Welsh coastal town of Conway, nowadays addressed by its Welsh name of Conwy, with the inland towns of Llanrwst and Betws y Coed. It opened in 1863 and was eventually absorbed into the lines operated by the London and North Western Railway. Today it continues to operate as part of the Conwy Valley Line.

== History ==
=== Proposals ===
Conway and Llanrwst Railway Act 1860
- Act of Parliament
- Parliament of the United Kingdom
- Long title: An Act for making a Railway from the Chester and Holyhead Railway near Conway to Llanrwst.
- Citation: 23 & 24 Vict. c. cxlix

Dates
- Royal assent: 23 July 1860

Conway and Llanrwst Railway Act 1861
- Act of Parliament
- Parliament of the United Kingdom
- Long title: An Act for enabling the Conway and Llanrwst Railway Company to make a Deviation and Alteration of their authorized Line of Railway; and for other Purposes.
- Citation: 24 & 25 Vict. c. clxxix

Dates
- Royal assent: 22 July 1861

As early as 1846, the Chester and Holyhead Railway (CHR) planned a branch from its mainline at Conway along the Conwy valley to Llanrwst. Although this plan did not result in a railway, in 1853 a proposal for the Conway and Llanrwst Railway was laid before Parliament. This first bill was withdrawn following a proposal for an alternative route from the CHR. A third attempt for a railway along the valley came from the engineer Edmund Sharpe who worked for the CHR. He proposed a narrow gauge line of 1,000 mm (3 ft 3 3/8 in) gauge along the west side of the valley. This proposal was rejected by the CHR in 1858. Sharpe then joined the promoters of the original Conway and Llanrwst Railway who at a second attempt gained official approval for their railway in July 1860 in the Conway and Llanrwst Railway Act 1860 (23 & 24 Vict. c. cxlix).

=== Construction ===
Construction of the railway began in August 1860. By this time the CHR had become part of the London and North Western Railway (LNWR), and the board of the LNWR decided to purchase the Conway and Llanrwst Railway Company and run the railway as a branch of their main line to Holyhead. By 1863 the railway was a part of the LNWR.

=== Opening ===
The line opened on 16 June 1863. In July 1865, the LNWR gained a further act of Parliament, the London and North Western Railway (Additional Powers, Wales) Act 1865 (28 & 29 Vict. c. cccxxxiv) enabling an extension of the line to Betws y Coed, which was then becoming a favoured tourist attraction. This extension was opened in 1868.

== The route today ==
The Conway and Llanrwst Railway continues to operate in 2008, as part of the Conwy Valley Line.

== Sources ==
- Baughan, Peter E. (1980). A Regional History of the Railways of Great Britain: Volume 11 North and Mid Wales (1st ed.). Newton Abbot: David & Charles. ISBN 0-7153-7850-3. OCLC 6823219.
- Baughan, Peter E. (1991). A Regional History of the Railways of Great Britain: Volume 11 North and Mid Wales (2nd ed.). Nairn: David St John Thomas. ISBN 0-9465-3759-3. OCLC 26361284.
