= Blaenau Ffestiniog railway station =

Railway station in Gwynedd, Wales

Blaenau Ffestiniog
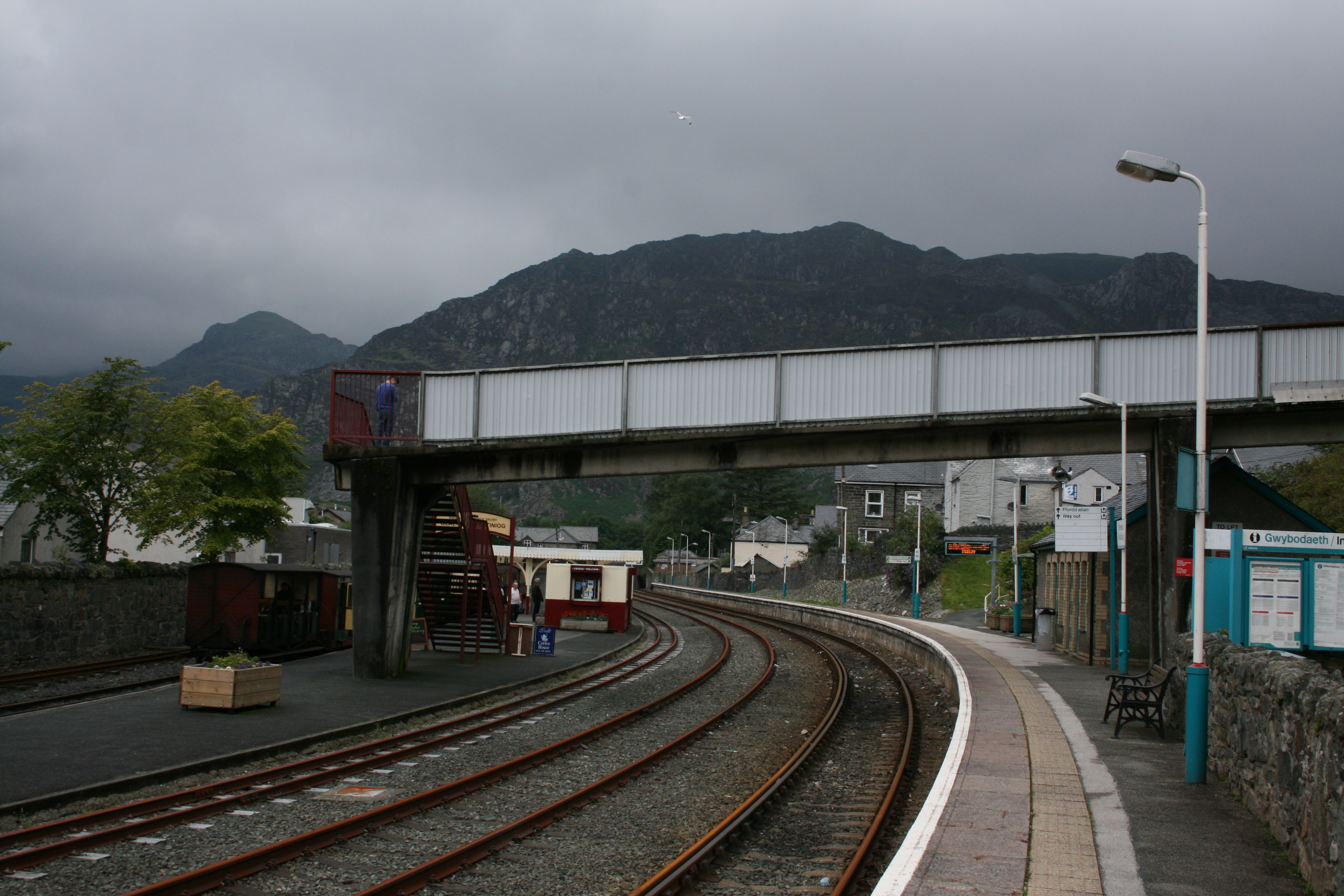

General information
- Location: Blaenau Ffestiniog, Gwynedd; Wales
- Coordinates: 52.99460°N 3.93838°W
- Grid reference: SH700458
- Manager: Transport for Wales Rail (platform 1); Ffestiniog Railway (platforms 2 & 3)
- Platforms: 2 narrow gauge / 1 standard gauge

Other information
- Station code: BFF
- Classification: DfT category F1

History
- Original company: Festiniog and Blaenau Railway

Key dates
- 30 May 1868: Opened as Duffws
- 1 November 1882: Closed
- 10 September 1883: Reopened and renamed as Blaenau Festiniog
- 18 June 1951: Renamed Blaenau Festiniog Central
- 4 January 1960: Closed
- 21 March 1982: Joint British Rail/Ffestiniog station open as Blaenau Ffestiniog Central
- 22 March 1982: Standard gauge (platform 1) opened
- 25 May 1982: Narrow gauge (platform 3) opened
- ????: Renamed Blaenau Ffestiniog

Passengers
- 2021/22: ▲17,958
- 2022/23: ▲29,810
- 2023/24: ▲39,950
- 2024/25: ▲47,240
- 2025/26: ▼45,622
Location
Notes
- Passenger statistics from the Office of Rail and Road

Blaenau Ffestiniog railway station serves the slate mining town of Blaenau Ffestiniog, Wales, and is the southern terminus of the Conwy Valley Line. Transport for Wales Rail operates services to Llandudno Junction and Llandudno. National Rail shares the station with the narrow gauge Ffestiniog Railway, which operates primarily tourist passenger services to Porthmadog throughout most of the year. A feature of the standard gauge service is the availability on trains and buses of the popular Gwynedd Red Rover day ticket.

== History ==
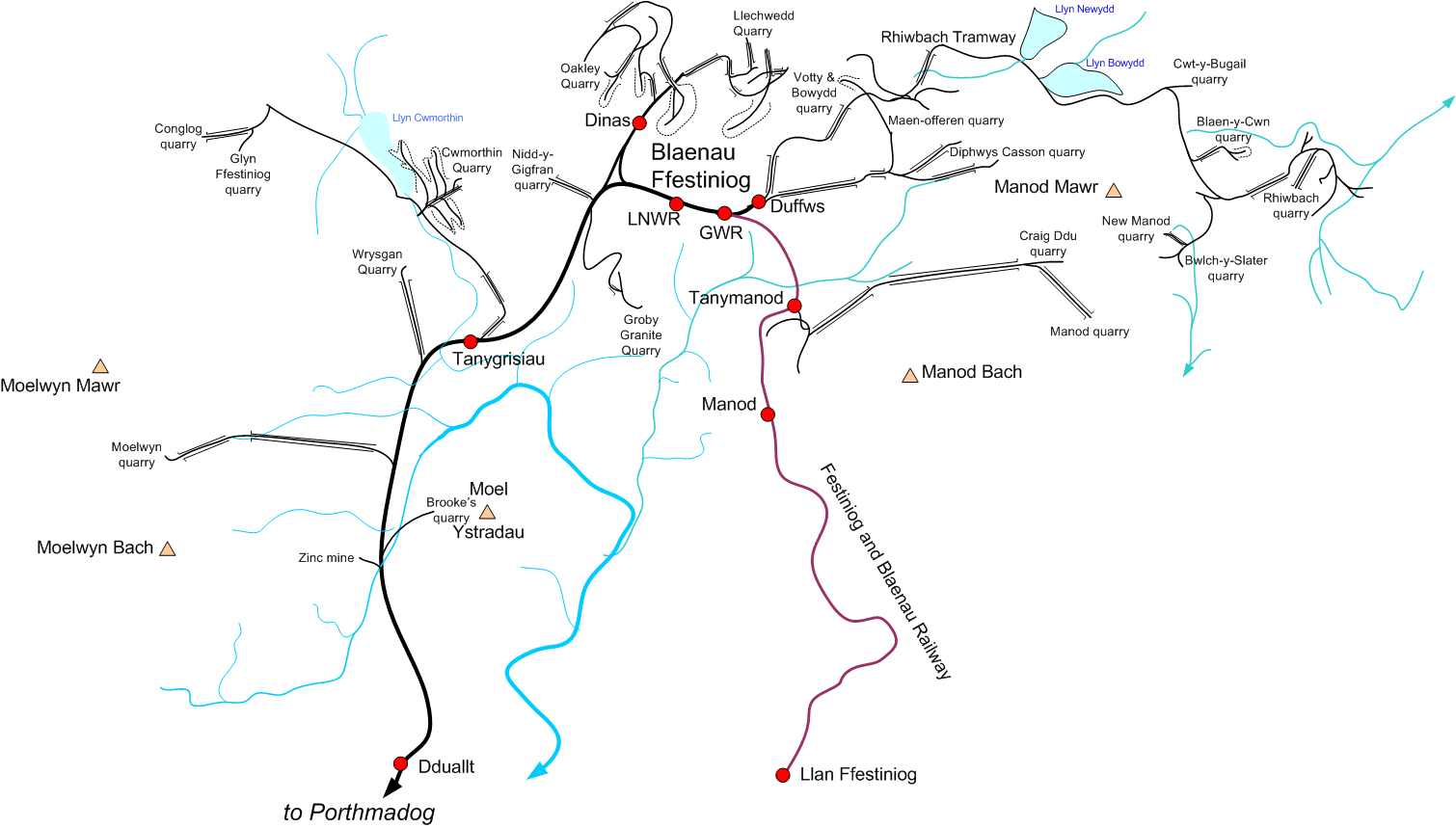
Railways in the Blaenau Ffestiniog area

The evolution of Blaenau's passenger stations was complex, with five different railway companies providing services to the area:

=== Ffestiniog Railway ===
The first railway to be built in Blaenau Ffestiniog was the Festiniog Railway, which opened for slate traffic in 1836. The main line terminated at Dinas to the north west of the town (now buried under the spoil tip) with a branch line from a junction near Glanypwll to Duffws, near the town centre. The first passenger trains ran from Porthmadog to Dinas on 6 January 1865 and the passenger station at Duffws opened in January 1866. Until 1870, alternate trains ran to Dinas and Duffws but, by the end of 1870, Dinas passenger station had closed and all passenger services from then on terminated at Duffws.

An interchange station with the LNWR, known as Stesion Fain, was opened in 1881; an interchange with the GWR opened in 1883.

In 1931, Duffws closed as a passenger station and the GWR exchange station became the terminus.

The main Duffws station building survives as a Grade II listed building, now serving as a public toilet block on the central car park.

=== Festiniog and Blaenau Railway ===
Meanwhile, the narrow gauge Festiniog and Blaenau Railway had opened from Llan Ffestiniog to Blaenau Ffestiniog on 29 May 1868. Its station was located where the FR foot access gate is now located. The line was initially worked by the Ffestiniog Railway and all slate traffic on the F&BR throughout its existence was carried in FR-owned wagons. The FR station and F&BR station were both called Duffws, although they were several hundred yards apart and passengers walked between the two. On 1 September 1882, the standard gauge Bala Ffestiniog Line reached Llan Ffestiniog from the south. The following year, the narrow gauge line was converted to standard gauge, with the station reopening on 10 September 1883.

=== Conwy Valley Line ===
In 1879, the London and North Western Railway's (LNWR) Conwy Valley Line from Llandudno Junction became the first standard gauge railway to reach the town. It opened a temporary station near the mouth of Ffestiniog Tunnel, while it established its slate yards at the northern end of Blaenau Ffestiniog and built its passenger station near Glanypwll, across the road from the Ffestiniog Railway (FR).

The LNWR and FR co-operated to build parallel stations (Blaenau Festiniog by the LNWR and Stesion Fain by the FR) to form an interchange. This opened in 1881 and the temporary station at the tunnel mouth closed. The LNWR had built this line in order to seek a share of the Ffestiniog slate traffic (including the slate being carried by coastal steamer from Porthmadog to ports on the Irish Sea and elsewhere).

To this end, they established a slate wharf at Deganwy; a feature of early LNWR operation of the line was the carriage of slate in narrow gauge wagons from Blaenau to Deganwy pick-a-back on standard gauge wagons. So highly did the LNWR rate the commercial prospects of Blaenau Ffestiniog that, in the 1880s, they established their own hotel in the town, now demolished; it features in LNWR publicity of the period.

=== Bala to Ffestiniog Line ===
The last major change in the 19th century was the opening of the Great Western Railway line from Bala to Llan Ffestiniog in 1882, followed by the conversion of the Festiniog and Blaenau line to standard gauge in 1883. The Ffestiniog Railway provided an interchange platform adjoining the new GWR station in Blaenau.

Great Western Railway Circular 818 from the General Managers office J. Grierson at Paddington, dated 25 June 1883, stated: Blaenau station on the Bala And Festiniog section will be called Blaenau Festiniog.

From 1883 until 1930, there were therefore three, four or five railway passenger stations in use in Blaenau Ffestiniog, depending how interchange stations are counted. They were:

- Duffws (FR) - an uncomplicated single station
- The GWR/FR exchange station, a cross-platform interchange
- The co-operating pair of Stesion Fain and the ex-LNWR standard gauge station

Duffws station closed in 1931 and the two remaining FR parts of stations closed at the outbreak of war in 1939. A feature of GWR operation of this line from 1883 to 1945 was the carriage of slate in narrow gauge wagons from Tan-y-manod to Blaenau (about 0.75 miles) pick-a-back on standard gauge wagons.

=== Post Second World War ===
Following nationalisation, the LMS (ex-LNWR) station was renamed Blaenau Ffestiniog North and the GWR station became Blaenau Ffestiniog Central. The construction of the Tryweryn reservoir from 1958 brought the closure of the former GWR line to passengers on 2 January 1960 and to freight trains on 27 January 1961. Later, the construction of the Trawsfynydd nuclear power station in 1963 led to the extension of the Conwy Valley line to the Central station site in order to provide rail access to the power station. Passenger services continued to terminate at Blaenau Ffestiniog North.

=== 1982 consolidation ===
In 1982, with the completion of the rebuilding of the Festiniog Railway back to Blaenau Ffestiniog, the new Ffestiniog Railway/British Rail Joint Station was opened on the site of the Festiniog Railway/GWR Joint Station of 1883. British Rail trains first used the new station on 22 March 1982 and Festiniog Railway services to Blaenau Ffestiniog were resumed on 25 May 1982.

The former LNWR North station on the Conwy Valley line was therefore closed. The FR Stesion Fein was not rebuilt.

The new joint station was officially opened on 30 April 1983 by George Thomas, Speaker of the House of Commons, who unveiled a plaque at the station recording his visit. The Royal Oakeley Silver Band and the Brythoniaid Male Voice Choir led the celebrations.

=== Recent history ===
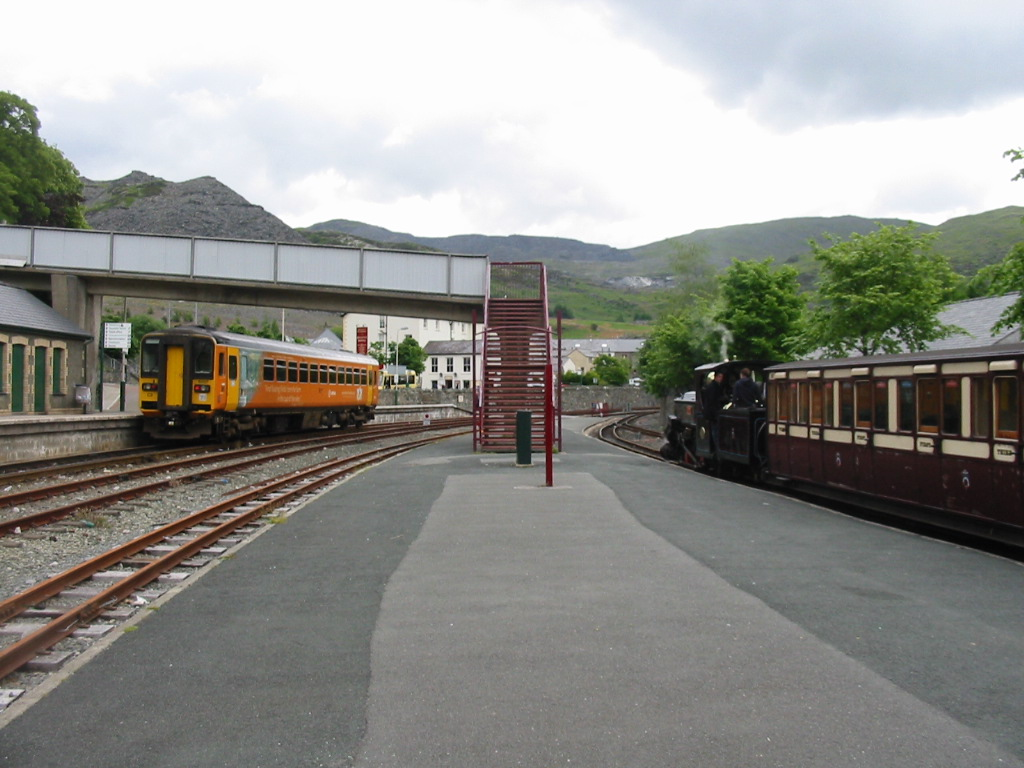
The station is served by mainline standard gauge diesel multiple units and narrow gauge trains of the Ffestiniog Railway

In 1990, the temporary wooden buildings on the narrow gauge island platform were replaced with new permanent masonry buildings. As part of these works, the platform 2 track was laid.

Plans for another rebuild, and construction of a modern joint station and facilities, were drawn up in 2008, but the project did not receive the required finance.

In March 2019, services were suspended and replaced by buses due to major track and infrastructure damage caused by the flooding associated with Storm Gareth. Network Rail announced on 25 June 2019 that the line would reopen in time for the staging of the National Eisteddfod in Llanrwst and the line was reopened as scheduled on 24 July 2019.

On 9 February 2020, the line was closed again due to further extensive flooding caused by Storm Ciara, with buses replacing trains. Following repairs to the line, it was reopened on 28 September 2020.

== Facilities ==
The standard gauge side has a single platform (numbered 1) opening directly onto the station car park and the High Street. There is a run-round loop used by occasional locomotive-hauled charter trains.

The narrow gauge side has an island platform (numbered 2 and 3) with an overall roof; this platform is reached by a footbridge, and also from the standard gauge platform and the town centre by a pedestrian level crossing at the terminal end. Narrow gauge trains normally use platform 3. There is also a run-round loop.

Train running information on the standard gauge side is provided via digital CIS displays, timetable posters, automatic announcements and public telephone. There is a single waiting shelter on the platform and there is step-free access to all three platforms (to the narrow-gauge side via a foot crossing at the south end).

== Services ==
Transport for Wales Rail operates six southbound arrivals and northbound departures on Mondays to Saturdays along the Conwy Valley Line; trains run approximately every three hours. There are four trains each way on Sundays.

The Ffestiniog Railway operates a seasonal service.

Preceding station	National Rail	Following station
Roman Bridge	Transport for Wales Conwy Valley Line	Terminus
Preceding station	Heritage railways	Following station
Tanygrisiau towards Porthmadog Harbour	Ffestiniog Railway	Terminus
Historical railways
Terminus	Festiniog and Blaenau Railway; 1868-1883	Tan-y-Manod; Line and station closed
Terminus	Great Western Railway; Bala Ffestiniog Line 1883-1960	Manod; Line and station closed
