= Llandudno branch line =

Railway line in Wales

The Llandudno branch line is a three-mile railway branch to the town from the main line at Llandudno Junction, Wales. It was opened in 1858, and it encouraged the development of the town as a tourist and holiday destination. Due to the popularity of the town, the station facilities at Llandudno station were progressively improved. Deganwy, on the branch line, was for some time a useful port.

For many years, the branch line has been exclusively in use by passenger trains; there is a frequent service with through trains to Manchester Airport and elsewhere. The line is at the northern extremity of the train service between Blaenau Ffestiniog and Llandudno, marketed as the Conwy Valley line.

== Origins ==
The Chester and Holyhead Railway was conceived to carry the Irish mail traffic to Holyhead, from where there was a ferry service. The line opened throughout in 1850.

Llandudno was an important settlement before the conception of the Chester and Holyhead Railway, but it was by-passed by that line, and Llandudno passengers had to use Conway station at first. When plans for the Irish mail traffic were being developed, Ormes Bay, immediately on the east side of Llandudno, was considered as a possible location for a harbour for the ferry.

Saint George's Harbour Act 1853
- Act of Parliament
- Parliament of the United Kingdom
- Long title: An Act for the Construction and Maintenance of a Harbour at Llandudno in the County of Carnarvon.
- Citation: 16 & 17 Vict. c. ccxiii

Dates
- Royal assent: 20 August 1853

Text of statute as originally enacted

In fact this development was authorised by the Saint George's Harbour Act 1853 (16 & 17 Vict. c. ccxiii) of 20 August 1853. A harbour would be built in Ormes Bay and a railway facing Holyhead would run from it to join the C&HR main line east of the River Conwy. Conway station was to be the junction, but it was realised that the station was too small and the site too cramped. Instead the junction was made facing Chester, and a station was provided at the western extremity of the present-day location. The plan to build a harbour was dropped, Holyhead having established itself by this time.

A Communication by Railway or otherwise from the said Port or Harbour and Works to connect the same with the Chester and Holyhead Railway, such Communication to commence at or near the Landing Place or Quay of the aforesaid Harbour in the said Parish of Llandudno, and thence to pass from, in, through, or along the said Parish of Llandüdno, and the Parishes of Eglwys Rhos, Llandrilloyn Rhos, and Llangwystenin, or some of them, and to terminate by a Junction with the Chester and Holyhead Railway at some Point within some or One of the above-mentioned Parishes, together with all necessary Approaches, Embankments, Stations, and Depóts connected with the said Harbour and Railway or either of them. — Section 17, Saint George's Harbour Act 1853 (16 & 17 Vict. c. ccxiii)

== Opening ==
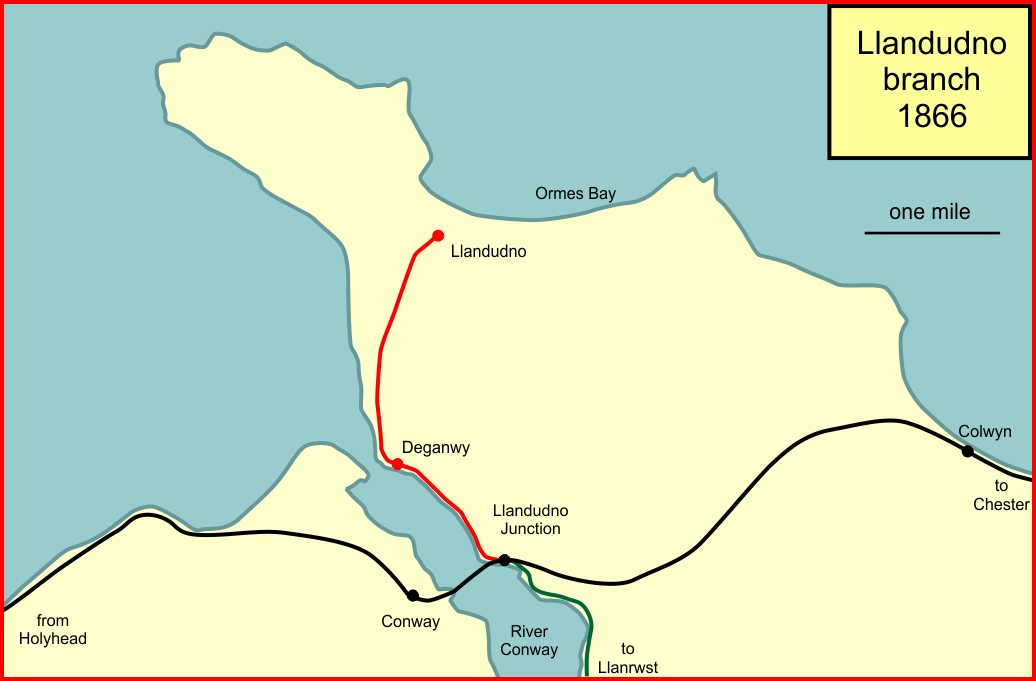
The Llandudno branch line

The three-mile branch line was opened by the Saint George's Harbour Company on 1 October 1858. The London and North Western Railway had absorbed the Chester and Holyhead main line by this time, and the LNWR worked the trains on the Llandudno branch. In the winter of the first few years when traffic was very light, horse traction was adopted.

St. George's Harbour Act 1861
- Act of Parliament
- Parliament of the United Kingdom
- Long title: An Act for authorizing a Lease or Sale of the Railway of the Saint Georges Harbour Company to the London and North-western Railway Company; and for reducing and regulating the Capital of the Saint Georges Harbour Company; and for other Purposes.
- Citation: 24 & 25 Vict. c. ccxix

Dates
- Royal assent: 1 August 1861

The Llandudno branch line was leased to the LNWR in 1862, that having been authorised by the St. George's Harbour Act 1861 (24 & 25 Vict. c. ccxix), and an intermediate station on the branch was opened at Deganwy in 1866. The Conwy Valley line from Llandudno Junction to Betws-y-Coed opened in 1868 and much of the slate traffic came down by rail, transferring to ships at Deganwy.

The line was vested in the LNWR by the London and North-western Railway (New Works and Additional Powers) Act 1873 (36 & 37 Vict. c. cci) of 28 July 1873, and the track was doubled and general improvements were made. The layout at Llandudno Junction was altered so as to allow through running to and from the main line. The tourist and leisure traffic continued to increase and additional excursion platforms were installed at Llandudno in 1885.

The wharf at Deganwy was further extended in 1882, as it was taking considerable volumes of slate from the Conwy Valley. That line reached Blaenau Ffestiniog in 1887 and huge volumes of slate and timber traffic were handled from 1885. Some of the slate came down from Blaenau Festiniog in narrow gauge wagons, carried on standard gauge runners. Although the arrangement worked, it was not a commercial success because most of the slate was destined for southern markets via Portmadoc, and the LNWR route was not competitive.

== Llandudno station improvements ==
At Easter 1892 Llandudno station was further extended, now having five platforms.

Llandudno Junction station on the main line had long been awkward, and extension on the Conway Valley line prompted improvement there too. The entry of the Conway line to the junction was relocated to the east and a new Llandudno Junction station was opened on 1 November 1897, better accommodating Llandudno branch trains in addition.

In the summer season, traffic was very busy, and to ease the problem of stabling and servicing passenger stock, the wharf sidings at Deganwy were used for the purpose. Locomotive servicing facilities were provided there.

== Train service ==
In 1895 there were thirteen passenger trains each way on weekdays on the branch. There is no indication in Bradshaw that any of the trains were through to destinations off the branch itself.

By 1910 the index in Bradshaw shows a large number of distant destinations; there were 31 departures from Llandudno, of which eight were "motor trains". Several trains apparently (Note: Bradshaw did not show whether journeys were by through train.) run through to Rhyl.

In July 1922 there were 32 departures from Llandudno with some additional non-daily services. A few passed Llandudno Junction without calling.

== Later years ==
Deganwy goods yard closed on 7 September 1964.

After 1978 two of the five platforms were taken out, as were the carriage sidings near Maesddu bridge.

In the summer of 2000 Class 37 locomotives regularly hauled a passenger train from Manchester to Llandudno, returning later. By this time all local trains services were dealt with by multiple unit trains, so a shunter travelled by road from Holyhead to uncouple and recouple the locomotive for the run-round movement.

== Present day ==
The branch continues in use at present (2019) with passenger services from Llandudno to Llandudno Junction. There are 27 departures Monday to Friday. Some journeys continue to Manchester Airport, or Cardiff. Five of the journeys continue to Blaenau Ffestiniog, under a subsidised arrangement, using the marketing branding The Conwy Valley Line.

== Station list ==
- Llandudno; opened 1 October 1858; moved to new location 1 July 1903; still open;
- Deganway; opened April 1868; renamed Deganwy 1882; still open;
- Llandudno Junction; opened 1 October 1858; relocated 1 November 1897; still open.
