= Conwy Valley line =

Railway line in North Wales

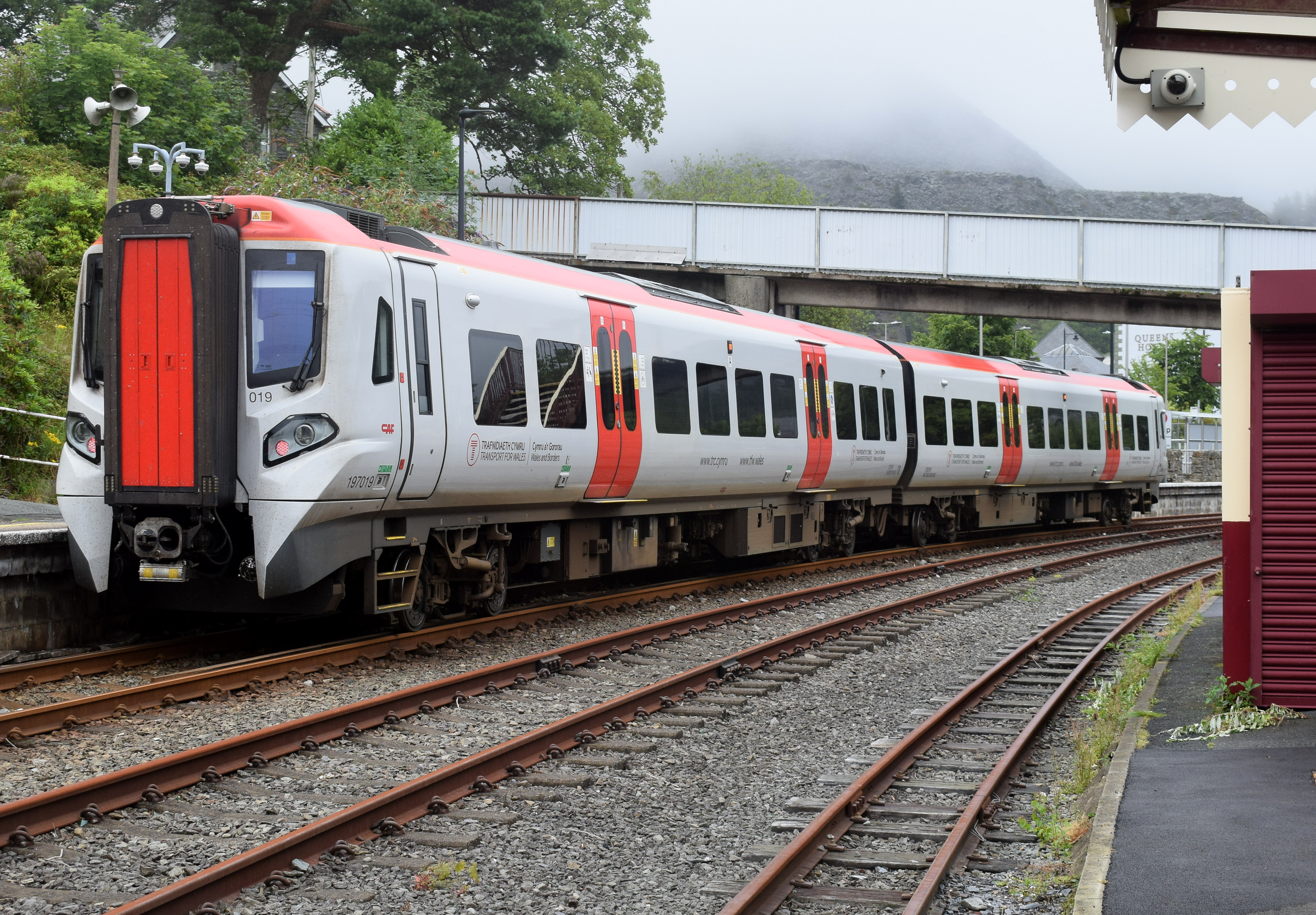
- A class 197 train at Blaenau Ffestiniog, the interchange between the Conwy Valley line and the narrow gauge Ffestiniog Railway

Overview
- Other name(s): Conwy Valley Railway; Rheilffordd Dyffryn Conwy
- Native name: Llinell Dyffryn Conwy (Welsh)
- Owner: Network Rail
- Locale: Conwy; Gwynedd
- Termini: Llandudno; Blaenau Ffestiniog
- Stations: 13

Service
- Type: Heavy Rail
- Operator: Transport for Wales Rail
- Rolling stock: Current; British Rail Class 197; Previous; British Rail Class 150 Sprinter; British Rail Class 153 Super Sprinter

History
- Opened: 1879

Technical
- Line length: 30.8 miles (49.6 km)
- Number of tracks: 2 (Llandudno–Llandudno Junction); 1 (Llandudno Junction–North Llanrwst); 2 (Passing loop at North Llanrwst); 1 (North Llanrwst–Blaenau Ffestiniog)
- Character: Rural
- Track gauge: 4 ft 8 1/2 in (1,435 mm) standard gauge
- Electrification: None
Route map
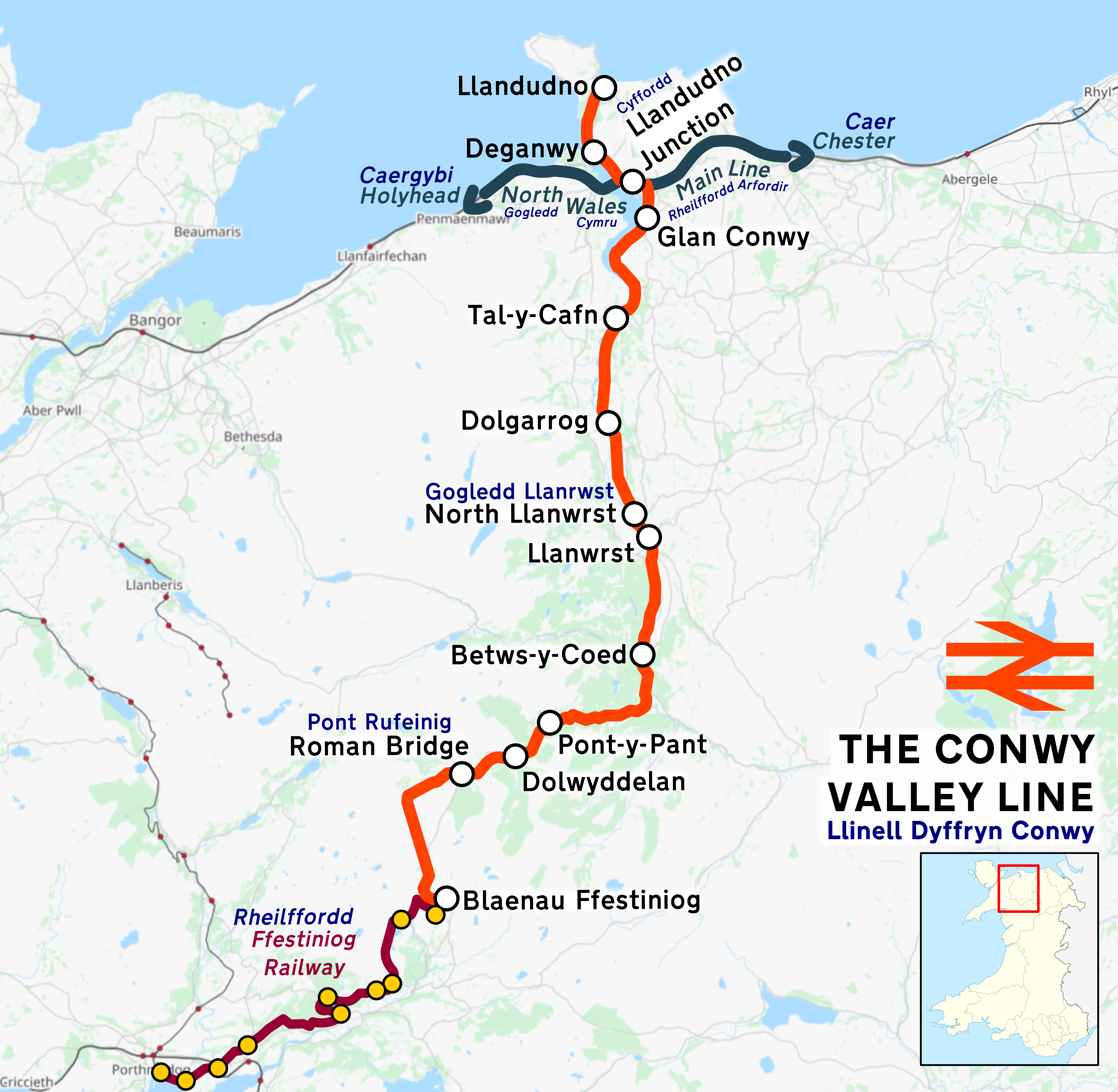
(Click to expand)

The Conwy Valley line (Welsh: Llinell Dyffryn Conwy) is a railway line in North West Wales. It runs from Llandudno via Llandudno Junction (Welsh: Cyffordd Llandudno) to Blaenau Ffestiniog. The service is operated by Transport for Wales Rail and is marketed as the Conwy Valley Railway (Welsh: Rheilffordd Dyffryn Conwy).

The line was originally part of the London and North Western Railway, being opened in stages to 1879. Its primary purpose was to carry slate from the Ffestiniog quarries to a specially built quay at Deganwy (occasionally referred to as St George's Dock) for export by sea. The line also provided goods facilities for the market town of Llanrwst, and via the extensive facilities at Betws-y-Coed on the London to Holyhead turnpike road it served many isolated communities in Snowdonia and also the developing tourist industry.

Although only a little over 27 miles (43 km) between Llandudno and Blaenau Ffestiniog, the journey takes over one hour, largely due to the sinuous and steeply graded nature of the route taken (particularly south of Betws-y-Coed). Most of the stations along the line are treated as request stops.

== History ==
The first section from Llandudno Junction to Llanrwst (now called North Llanrwst) was built as the Conway and Llanrwst Railway and opened in 1863. The LNWR took over in 1863 and opened the extension to Betws-y-Coed in 1868.

The next extension was to Blaenau Ffestiniog to access the output of the large slate quarries there. At first the LNWR proposed a 2 ft (610 mm) narrow gauge railway via the steeply graded Lledr Valley to Blaenau Ffestiniog, to be called the "Bettws & Festiniog Railway"; authorisation was sought in November 1870. After construction began, it was decided that the extension would be built to standard gauge, allowing through running of trains. Between 1874 and 1879 the railway tunnel underneath Moel Dyrnogydd was bored, and in July 1879 a terminus was initially opened by the tunnel entrance. The line was subsequently extended by the best part of a mile to a terminus in the town, which opened 31 March 1881.

Blaenau Ffestiniog's other standard gauge railway, the Bala and Ffestiniog Railway, was closed to all traffic in 1961, and a portion was flooded in the creation of the Llyn Celyn reservoir. A rail connection was desired for the nuclear power station under construction at Trawsfynydd, and a connecting line was built from Blaenau Ffestiniog North to the site of the demolished Blaenau Ffestiniog Central station for freight use. With the reconstruction of the Ffestiniog Railway, passenger services were relocated to a new joint station on the site of the old Central station in 1982. Regular freight traffic to Trawsfynydd nuclear power station ceased in 1995, and the power station is being decommissioned.

The line's proximity to the River Conwy at its northern end has led to periodic problems with flooding over the years. In 2004, 2005 and 2019 floods resulted in prolonged closures whilst the trackbed and embankments were rebuilt; the 2004 floods put the line out of action from early February until 22 May that year.

The line was again closed from 27 December 2015 for seven weeks, after the formation was damaged by floodwater in more than 100 places following heavy rain on Boxing Day.

A further closure occurred between February and April 2017 after Storm Doris, when a tree fell on the track near Pont-y-Pant. Engineers had to move over 300 tonnes of rock and fallen vegetation during the recovery work.

In March 2019 the line closed again due to severe damage to infrastructure caused by Storm Gareth. The damage from the storm had left sections of the line suspended in the air as the embankments had been washed away, and other sections were under water, which made the route unsafe for rail traffic. Following repair work, the line from Llandudno Junction to North Llanwrst was re-opened on 24 July 2019, in time for the National Eisteddfod; the rest of the route would reopen in August.

Storm Ciara's heavy rainfall on 8–9 February 2020 once again damaged the trackbed near the Conwy estuary north of Llanrwst, closing the line yet again. Ballast was washed away in several sections. The line reopened on 28 September following repair work and additional mitigation work in vulnerable locations. Progress of the repair work was partly affected by the COVID-19 pandemic.

The Ffestiniog tunnel has also been closed on two separate occasions to repair water damage to the tunnel roof and a subsequent rockfall.

== Modern services ==
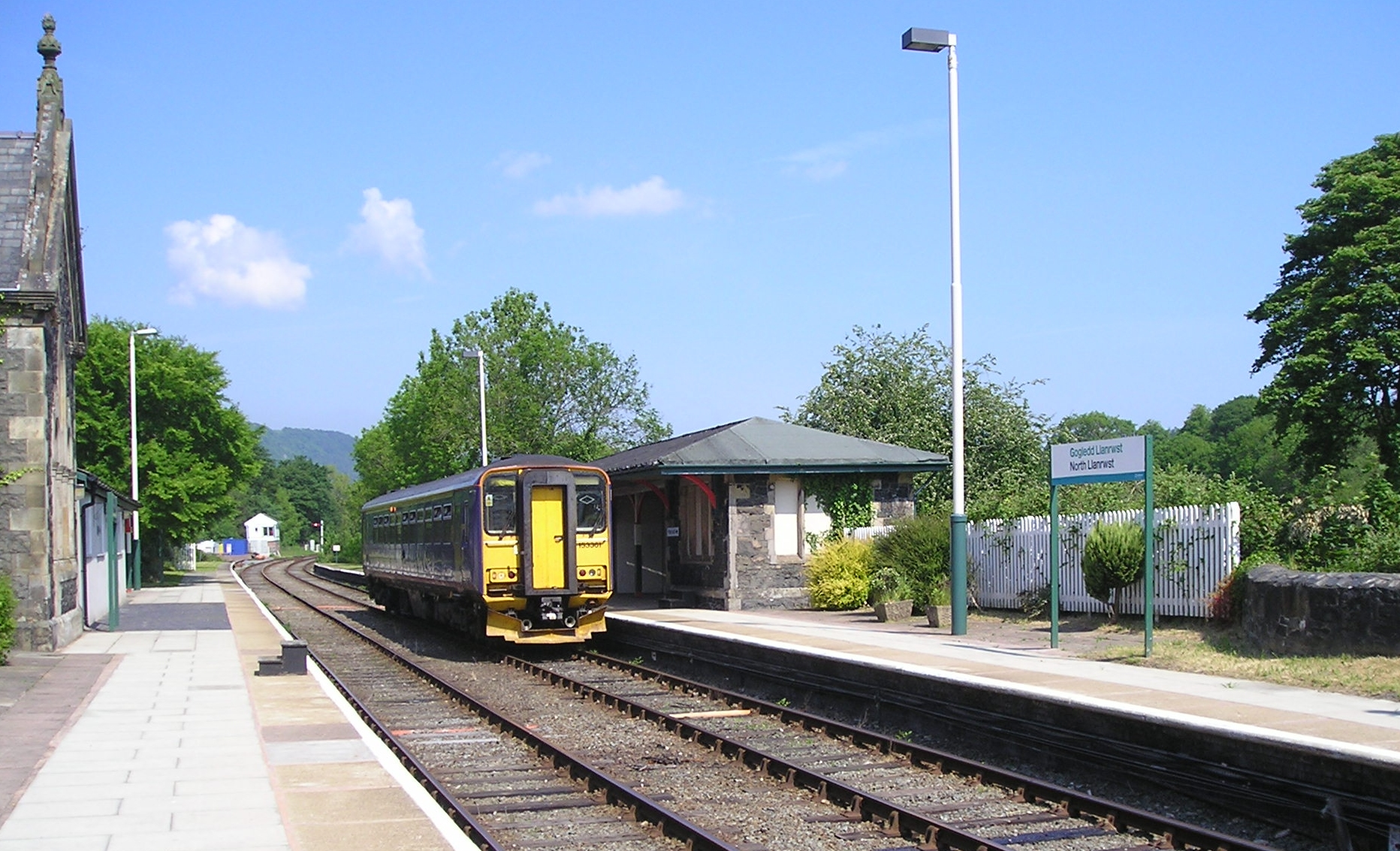
North Llanrwst station platforms – railcar leaving for Blaenau Ffestiniog

The line from Llandudno Junction to Blaenau is single track, and includes the longest single track railway tunnel in the United Kingdom (over 2.2 miles or 3.5 kilometres). The line's summit 790 feet (240 m) above sea level is located midway through the tunnel and the gradients either side of it are as steep as 1-in-47 (2.1%) on the southbound ascent through Pont-y-pant and 1-in-43 (2.3%) on the climb out of the terminus at Blaenau for northbound trains.

Between Llandudno Junction and Llandudno the service uses the double track Llandudno branch line from the North Wales Coast Line. The fully signalled passing loop at North Llanrwst is the last remaining between Llandudno Junction and Blaenau Ffestiniog and trains on the branch must stop at the signal box there to exchange tokens for the single line sections on either side.

The line is currently served by 6 trains per day in both directions from Monday to Saturday between Llandudno and Blaenau Ffestiniog (and vice versa), with the first two southbound services of the day starting (and first northbound service turning back) at Llandudno Junction and terminating in Blaenau Ffestiniog. The service is reduced to 4 trains per day in both directions on Sundays; this service now operates all year round, rather than in summer only as it did up until the winter 2019 timetable change.

A feature of the service is the availability on Conwy Valley trains as well as on local buses in Snowdonia of the new "Tocyn Taith" day ticket. From 20 May 2007, concessionary travel pass holders resident in Conwy and Gwynedd have been able to travel free of charge on the Conwy Valley Railway line between Llandudno and Blaenau Ffestiniog, as well as between Llandudno Junction and Llandudno on all Transport for Wales Rail services, as a result of funding provided by the Welsh Government.

A 2008 proposal would have seen the line upgraded to take slate from Blaenau Ffestiniog to the coast. The proposal, supported by Gwynedd Council, could have created 50 jobs in Blaenau Ffestiniog.

In 2013/14 an estimated 116,500 passenger journeys were made on the line, excluding exits and entries at the main line stations of Llandudno Junction, Deganwy and Llandudno. This was a small increase compared with the figure of 112,134 in 2012/13. Figures show that Blaenau Ffestiniog is the busiest of the line's stations with 44,828 passengers in 2013/14, followed by Betws-y-Coed with 35,400. Other stations have very low footfall with Dolgarrog attracting just 828 passengers in 2013/14.

In October 2018 operations transferred to the new franchise holder KeolisAmey Wales, who announced that they would use a British Rail Class 230 D-Train on the line in late 2019, replacing the British Rail Class 150 then used on the line; however, this change never materialised. The franchise was nationalised in February 2021 and, from the end of 2022, British Rail Class 197 two-car units were used on the line.

=== Community rail ===
This is designated as a community rail partnership.

=== Steam workings ===
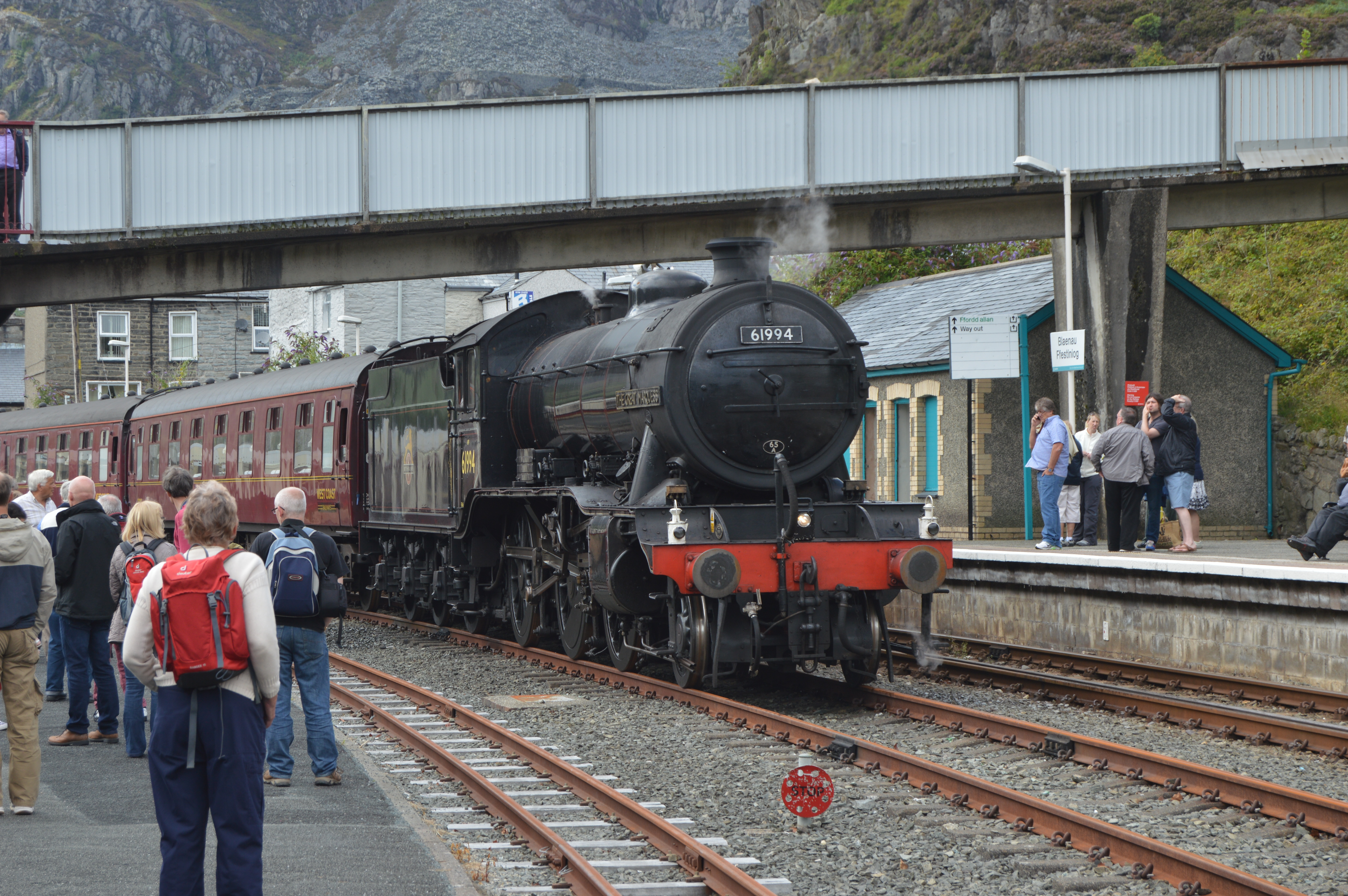
LNER K4 no 61994 The Great Marquess in the loop at Blaenau Ffestiniog after arriving with "The Welsh Mountaineer" on Tue 29 July 2014.

Since the end of mainline steam running on the British national rail network in the 1960s, the Conwy line has seen occasional runs by preserved or restored steam locomotives, the first of these dating to 1998. Owing to steep gradients, these have often been limited in the number of coaches that may be hauled along the route.

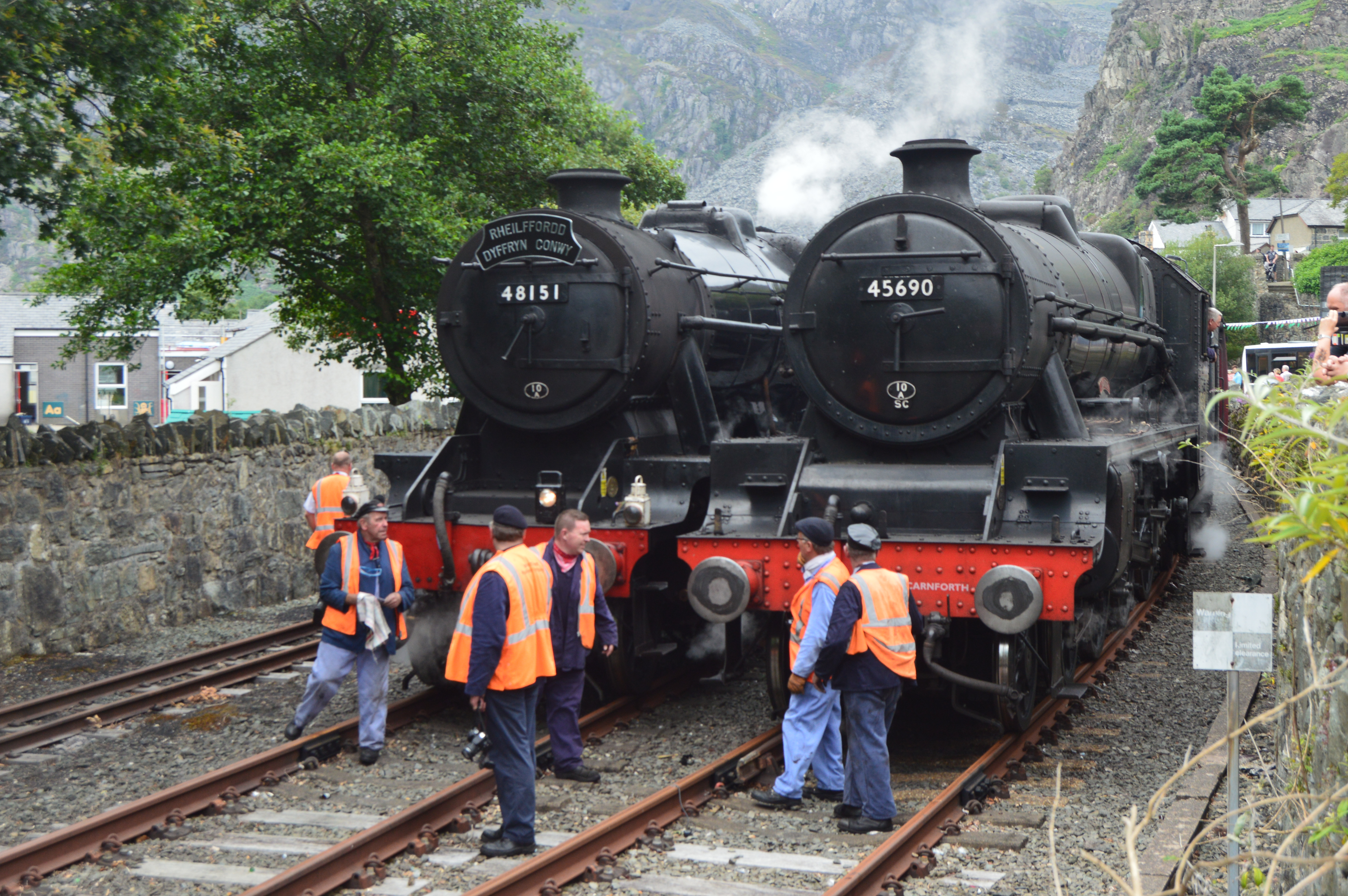
48151 & 45690 Leander parked up side by side after arriving with "The Conwy Quest" railtour on Sat 3 August 2019.

To mark the full reopening of the line following damage from Storm Gareth in 2019, Transport for Wales Rail in co-operation with West Coast Railways ran a train called "The Conwy Quest" from Chester to Blaenau Ffestiniog via Llandudno Junction.

== Route ==
The following towns and villages are served by the line:

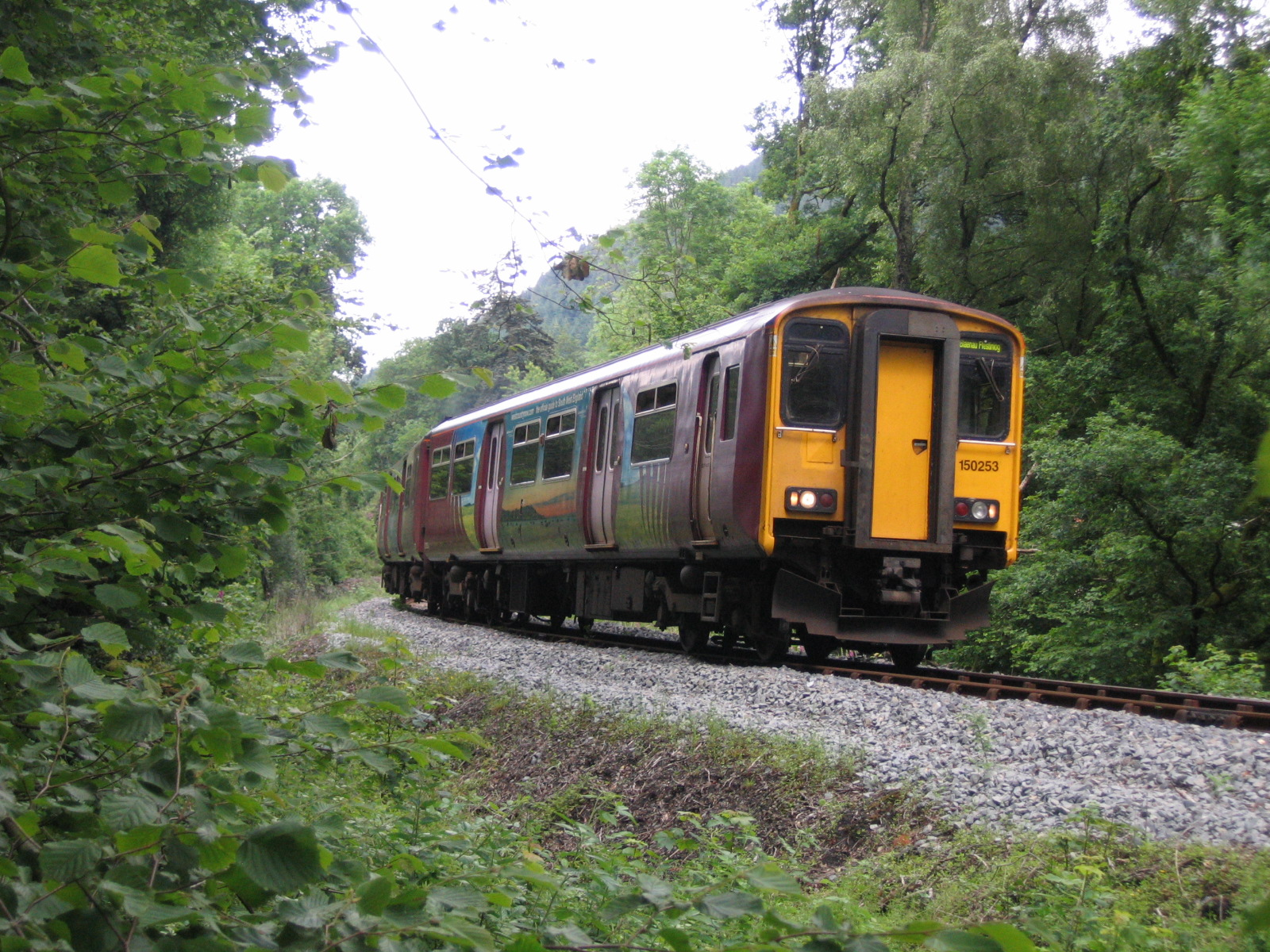
150253 heading into the Lledr Valley in the Summer of 2007.

- Llandudno
- Deganwy
- Llandudno Junction
  - for North Wales Coast Line
- Glan Conwy
- Tal-y-Cafn
- Dolgarrog
- Llanrwst (for Trefriw)
- Betws-y-Coed
- Pont-y-Pant railway station
- Dolwyddelan
- Roman Bridge railway station
- Blaenau Ffestiniog
  - for Ffestiniog Railway

The original line terminated at the North Western station (where there were extensive slate yards) to the west of Blaenau Ffestiniog town centre. However, following the closure and removal of a section of the former Great Western Railway line from Bala, a short section of new railway was built alongside the Ffestiniog Railway Company's narrow gauge line in order to connect the Conwy Valley line with the isolated section of the GWR line, which had been retained to serve the nuclear power station at Trawsfynydd. Years later a new Blaenau Ffestiniog station was constructed in the centre of the town. Beyond the new station, the line was used only for goods traffic connected with Trawsfynydd, although occasional special passenger trains have been run at times. In recent years, the traffic from Trawsfynydd has ceased completely (the last charter special ran in October 1998) and the line has been disconnected from the Conwy Valley line just outside Blaenau Ffestiniog station.

There are connections at Llandudno Junction with the North Wales Coast Line (the main line between London and Holyhead) and at Blaenau Ffestiniog with the Ffestiniog Railway to Porthmadog.
