= Blaenau Ffestiniog passenger stations =

Railway stations in north west Wales

Coordinates: 52°59′41″N 3°56′14″W

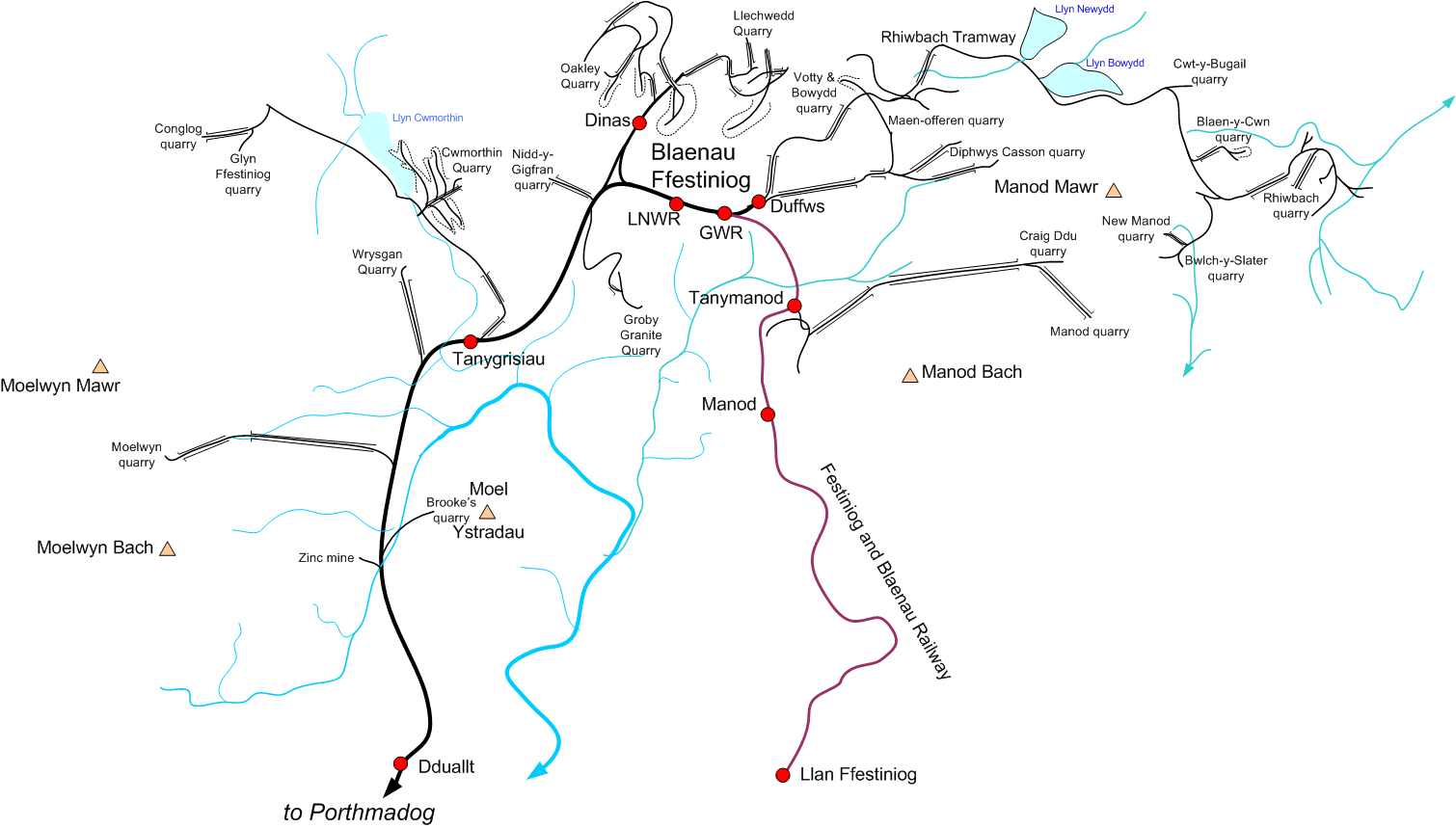
Map of the railways, railway stations, and slate quarries around Blaenau Ffestiniog

North west Wales experienced a slate boom in the first half of the nineteenth century. Three sites stood out as experiencing the most explosive growth: Dinorwic near Llanberis, Penrhyn near Bethesda and Blaenau Ffestiniog.

This article describes the complex evolution of railway passenger services in Blaenau Ffestiniog.

== Context ==
The Dinorwic and Penrhyn quarries dealt with the problem of getting their products to market by building their own railways to take slates to ports: the Padarn Railway and the Penrhyn Railway respectively. The LNWR built branches seeking to tap the output, but the quarry owners maintained a tight hold, lest they become beholden to others.

The position at Blaenau Ffestiniog was different in three respects:

- Penrhyn and Dinorwic were monopolies, but there were several competing quarries at Blaenau
- Dinorwic and Penrhyn quarries had short easy routes to ports and national transport, but Blaenau did not
- unlike the Padarn and Penrhyn railways, the Ffestiniog Railway was independent of the quarry companies.

In Blaenau, therefore,

- rival railways were encouraged by quarry owners seeking to pay lower charges and receive better service, whereas the Dinorwic and Penrhyn companies actively sought to exclude rival railways
- people considering opening rival lines to Blaenau saw the prospect of profit, despite the formidable obstacles of distance and terrain

In addition, neither Llanberis nor Bethesda experienced the explosive population growth witnessed in Blaenau, leading railway promoters to believe a significant potential passenger market existed beyond workmen's trains.

This must all be seen in the context of a boom industry, where heady hopes affected normally sober minds.

== Five and a half railways ==
In all, five separate railway companies built lines to tap Blaenau's seemingly limitless potential:

- The Ffestiniog Railway
- The Festiniog and Blaenau Railway
- The Bala and Festiniog Railway, which was a GWR proxy
- The London and North Western Railway
- British Railways and the revived Ffestiniog Railway latterly rebuilt old and forged new lines in Blaenau's rebirth.

In addition

- The Merionethshire Railway received Royal Assent but was never built; its purpose was to frighten the Ffestiniog Railway.

== Passenger stations ==
All five railway companies built stations in the town, all within an 800-metre radius, most within a 400-metre radius. For this purpose the "boundary stations" immediately outside Blaenau are Tanygrisiau (FR), Roman Bridge (LNWR and Network Rail), Tan-y-Manod (F&BR) and Manod (GWR), all of these except Roman Bridge are sometimes referred to as being in Blaenau.

- The narrow gauge Ffestiniog Railway (FR) built five stations:
  - its first terminus Dinas (FR) (1865–1870)
  - the second terminus Duffws (FR) (1866–1931)
  - an interchange with the LNWR, Blaenau Festiniog Junction (also known as Stesion Fain) (1881–1939)
  - an interchange with the GWR, latterly named Blaenau Ffestiniog Central (1883–1939), and
  - the current interchange with the Conwy Valley Line, Blaenau Ffestiniog (1982-still open)
- The narrow gauge Festiniog and Blaenau Railway (F&BR) built two stations:
  - its first terminus Duffws (F&BR) (1868 – April 1883), and
  - its second, temporary terminus Glynllifon Street (April–September 1883)
- The standard gauge London and North Western Railway (LNWR) built two stations:
  - its temporary terminus Blaenau Ffestiniog (Pantyrafon) (1879–1881)
  - Blaenau Ffestiniog North, an interchange with the FR's Blaenau Festiniog Junction from 1881 to 1939, remaining as a stand-alone station until 1982
- The standard gauge Great Western Railway (GWR) built one station, through its proxy the Bala and Festiniog Railway
  - an interchange with the FR, latterly named Blaenau Ffestiniog Central (1883–1960)
- The standard gauge British Railways (BR) built one station:
  - the current interchange with the FR, named Blaenau Ffestiniog (1982-still open)

Whether this counts as eight, nine, ten or eleven stations depends on how the interchanges are counted.

== Stations' names ==
Apart from purely informal names, such as "Top Station" and "Bottom Station" used by residents of Creswell, Derbyshire to distinguish their two stations, the stations in Blaenau are especially confusing because of railway practice, anglicising, different sources, the passage of time and names elsewhere.

It was common practice throughout pre-nationalisation Britain for rival railway companies to give their stations the bare name of the town they served, for example two rival companies each had a station in Cleator Moor named "Cleator Moor", two in Bolsover were named "Bolsover" and so on. In Blaenau the FR and the F&BR both called their stations "Duffws", the stations were near each other, but wholly separate. Duffws looks Welsh, but isn't. The GWR and LNWR both named their stations "Blaenau Festiniog" even though they were 400 yards apart and unconnected.

This introduces the second source of complication, "Festiniog" is an anglicised spelling of the Welsh "Ffestiniog", both were used at different periods.

Different authoritative sources sometimes gave stations different names, for example, the station nameboards at the FR's interchange station with the LNWR proclaimed it to be "Blaenau Festiniog Junction", but their timetable and Bradshaw referred to it as "Blaenau Festiniog (L&NW)", meaning "station for the LNWR line". Locals called it "Stesion Fain" (Narrow station).

The fourth cause of complexity is the passage of time, the two Victorian standard gauge stations were officially "Blaenau Festiniog" until 1951 when their names were both separated and corrected, so the ex-GWR station changed from "Blaenau Festiniog" to "Blaenau Ffestiniog Central" and the ex-LNWR station changed from "Blaenau Festiniog" to "Blaenau Ffestiniog North", though that did not appear on its corporate-issue nameboards, which read "Blaenau Ffestiniog Station", a rare if not unique use of "Station" on a station nameboard.

Finally, although the two Duffwses are unique to Blaenau, the station name "Dinas" is not unique, there is a Dinas station near Caernarfon on the FR's sister Welsh Highland Railway, there are also other places beginning "Dinas...", such as Dinas Mawddwy. To add spice to the mix, the F&BR's Duffws station was sometimes called "Dinas" in F&BR literature.

== Timeline ==
The route diagram to the right of this text portrays the evolution of Blaenau's passenger stations. Each new section starts with the opening or closure of a station. The names used in each section seek to use the clearest description or name at the time, but link to the unique names used in Wikipedia.

Sections 11 to 14 show how the FR and standard gauge swapped sides at the start of Blaenau's railway revival.

In the text below spellings are as used at the time.

01: Blaenau Ffestiniog's first passenger station was opened in 1865 by the Festiniog Railway (FR). They named it "Dinas" which derives from mediaeval Welsh meaning "citadel" in English, not the modern Welsh "Dinas" meaning "city". It is recorded on Wikipedia as Dinas (FR) to distinguish it from the Dinas station near Caernarfon.

02: In 1866 the FR opened a town centre station which they named "Duffws". The name looks Welsh, but isn't, it is seemingly related to nearby quarries containing the name "Diffwys" (meaning 'steep slope or mountainside') sometimes written as "Diphwys". It is recorded on Wikipedia as Duffws (FR) to distinguish it from the next station to be opened, this time by another company. From 1866 to 1870 passenger trains from Portmadoc alternated between their two stations. The company referred the line to Dinas as the "Main Line" and the line to Duffws as "The Branch".

03: The narrow gauge Festiniog and Blaenau Railway (F&BR) opened Blaenau's next station, which they also named "Duffws". It was a couple of hundred yards from the FR's Duffws station, on the opposite side of Church Street. It was the northern terminus of their 3½ mile line from Llan Ffestiniog. The F&BR was a completely separate company from the FR. The station is recorded on Wikipedia as Duffws (F&BR) to distinguish it from the FR's Duffws (FR) station. There were now two companies operating in Blaenau – the FR and the F&BR.

04: Blaenau's first station closure occurred in 1870 when the FR closed Dinas to passengers, services being concentrated on Duffws (FR).

05: The LNWR arrived from the north in 1879, having drilled through two miles of solid rock to create Ffestiniog Tunnel. They built a temporary station at the tunnel's southern mouth. Sources differ on what it was called, with "Blaenau Festiniog" being the likeliest. It is recorded on Wikipedia as Blaenau Ffestiniog (Pantyrafon) to distinguish it from later stations including variations on "Blaenau Ffestiniog". This station was the furthest of all from the town centre. There were now three companies operating in Blaenau – FR, F&BR and LNWR.

06: Two stations opened and one closed on 1 April 1881. The LNWR closed its temporary Pantyrafon terminus by the tunnel mouth and opened its permanent station nearer the town centre, which it called "Blaenau Festiniog". It would go on to be renamed twice ("Blaenau Ffestiniog North" from 1951 and plain "Blaenau Ffestiniog" from 1968) and be described in timetables successively as Blaenau Festiniog (L&NW), Blaenau Festiniog (LMS), Blaenau Festiniog, Blaenau Ffestiniog North and finally Blaenau Ffestiniog. It is recorded on Wikipedia as Blaenau Ffestiniog North to distinguish it from later stations including variations on "Blaenau Ffestiniog".

The new station was built next to North Western Road, on the other side of which ran the FR, who opened a station which doubled as an interchange. The FR's station carried the nameboard "Blaenau Festiniog Junction", but this did not appear on FR literature, and sources rarely mention it. Locally the station was widely referred to as "Stesion Fain" (meaning Narrow station in English.) It is recorded on Wikipedia as Blaenau Festiniog Junction to distinguish it from later stations including variations on "Blaenau Ffestiniog", it can also be found under Stesion Fain.

07: In 1882 the Great Western Railway's (GWR) proxy, the Bala and Festiniog Railway, started to rebuild the F&BR to standard gauge. All measures were taken to enable F&BR traffic to continue during this process, including laying a third rail. By the Spring of 1883 the need to demolish Duffws (F&BR) to make way for its standard gauge replacement became imperative, so a temporary station was opened at Glynllifon Street, a short distance from the end of the line, enabling Duffws (F&BR) to be closed and demolished. The temporary station is recorded on Wikipedia as Glynllifon Street.

There were now four companies operating in Blaenau – FR, F&BR, LNWR and GWR.

08: On 10 September 1883 the Bala and Festiniog Railway (i.e. GWR) were able to open their station which replaced Duffws (F&BR), the new station was a true, physical interchange with the FR as it had two platform faces – standard gauge to the south and narrow gauge to the north, enabling passengers from (say) Bala to Tan-y-Bwlch to change trains simply by crossing the platform. The conversion of the F&BR tracks from narrow to standard gauge meant that no physical junction would ever be possible. The new station was called plain "Blaenau Festiniog", exactly the same as the LNWR station a quarter of a mile away. Sixty eight years later the new GWR/FR station would go on to be renamed Blaenau Ffestiniog Central, by which name it is recorded on Wikipedia.

Narrow gauge F&BR services and Glynllifon Street station were closed three days before the new station opened. There were now three companies operating in Blaenau – FR, LNWR and GWR. It would remain this way until 1923 when the LNWR became part of the London, Midland and Scottish Railway (LMSR), but that did not bring any changes to the stations or lines.

09: The Festiniog Railway's fortunes were closely allied to the slate trade, which, with a few brief respites, were in decline from the 1870s. Duffws (FR) closed to passengers for two years in the early 1920s then closed for good in 1931, though the last train called at the end of the 1930 Summer season. FR passenger services were cut back the couple of hundred yards to terminate at the GWR/FR interchange station, known on Wikipedia by its later name Blaenau Ffestiniog Central.

10: The Festiniog Railway struggled through the 1930s, especially when the Welsh Highland Railway lifebelt which it grabbed turned out to be made of lead. At the outbreak of the Second World War it ceased all passenger operations, never to resume until the preservation era. The railway closed completely in 1946, though the track through the middle of Blaenau continued to be used by the quarries, using their own staff and locomotives, until the early 1960s. The 1939 closure meant that the railway's two surviving stations in the town – Stesion Fain and their side of the GWR/FR station were closed, leaving just the two standard gauge companies, the LMSR and GWR providing passenger services.

In 1948 Britain's railways were nationalised, the ex-LNWR station became part of the London Midland Region of British Railways and the GWR station became part of BR's Western Region. In 1951 these stations were renamed Blaenau Ffestiniog North and Blaenau Ffestiniog Central respectively. From 1948 BR was the only railway company in town.

11: Blaenau's railways hit rock bottom in 1960 when Blaenau Ffestiniog Central closed. Double-figure daily usage figures and rising costs made their own case, but the decision to dam Afon Tryweryn and flood the line west of Bala sealed the station's fate.

Blaenau Ffestiniog now had just one company – British Railways – operating just one station – Blaenau Ffestiniog North.

12: Blaenau's railways were thrown a lifeline by the creation of Trawsfynydd nuclear power station which needed rail access to handle nuclear fuel. With the Bala line closed the only way to provide this was from the north via Blaenau.

The standard gauge line was initially laid over the south side of the route joining Blaenau Ffestiniog North with the decaying remains of the ex-GWR line south to Trawsfynydd Lake Halt, which was reinstated. This cut across the FR passenger route, though it left the FR freight route to Blaenau Ffestiniog North intact, but it petered out in 1962 anyway. The layout of the wholly new, quarter-mile cross-Blaenau line allowed room for the FR to get back to town in due course.

This had no immediate effect on passenger provision, but it secured the Conwy Valley Line and the route through Blaenau. Above all, it bought time.

The reinstated line saw regular nuclear traffic and for a period regular gunpowder traffic to Maentwrog Road. It hosted occasional enthusiasts' specials and in 1989–90 a regular Summer Sundays sightseeing service.

13: With the preservation era FR demonstrably a serious, professional railway with decent financial prospects for the town and area, agreement was reached over where it should go when it got "Back to Blaenau". The objective was for the Conwy Valley Line and the FR to open an interchange station inheriting the virtues and avoiding the vices of previous versions. The one-time Stesion Fain/LNWR site was considered, but the one-time F&BR, later Blaenau Ffestiniog Central site was chosen as the best. This involved slewing the standard gauge line to the north side of the cross-Blaenau route to allow the FR to re-enter on the south side, thereby swapping traditional sides at the historic Blaenau Ffestiniog Central site.

On 21 March 1982 British Railways closed the sole station in Blaenau and opened its part of the new Blaenau Ffestiniog station a quarter of a mile away on the ex-F&BR/ex-GWR site in the middle of town. They did so in the knowledge that the FR were hard on their heels striving to open their part of the new station.

14: The FR fulfilled its part of the bargain on 25 May 1982 when it opened its part of the Blaenau Ffestiniog interchange.

15: The nuclear power station having closed and all fissile material having been removed, the branch south of Blaenau Ffestiniog became redundant and closed. It has been protected, if not actively mothballed. Hopes have been expressed that an industrial use such as more nuclear activity at Trawsfynydd will once again secure the branch.

== Further material ==
- Bannister, Geoffrey F. (1987). Branch Line Byways Volume 2 Central Wales. Penryn, Cornwall: Atlantic Transport Publishers. ISBN 978-0-906899-26-7.
- Bannister, Geoffrey F. (1975). Great Western Steam off the Beaten Track. Truro: D. Bradford Barton. ISBN 978-0-85153-161-8.
- Baughan, Peter E. (1991). A Regional History of the Railways of Great Britain: North and Mid Wales. Regional railway history series (2nd ed.). Nairn: David St John Thomas Publisher. ISBN 978-0-946537-59-4. OL 11571058M. Vol 11.
- Boyd, James I.C. (October 1959). Mansell, K.G. (ed.). "Bala & Festiniog Section - W.R.". Railway World. 20 (233). London: Railway World Limited.
- Boyd, James I.C. (1988) [1972]. Narrow Gauge Railways in South Caernarvonshire – Volume 1. Headington: The Oakwood Press. ISBN 978-0-85361-365-7. OCLC 20417464.
- Boyd, James I. C. (1985). Narrow Gauge Railways in North Caernarvonshire, Volume 2: The Penrhyn Quarry Railways. Usk: The Oakwood Press. ISBN 978-0-85361-312-1. OL 8284743M. The British Narrow Gauge Railway No. 5.
- Boyd, James I. C. (1986). Narrow Gauge Railways in North Caernarvonshire, Volume 3: The Dinorwic Quarry and Railways, Great Orme Tramway and Other Rail Systems. The British Narrow Gauge Railway. Usk: The Oakwood Press. ISBN 978-0-85361-328-2. OL 8284745M. B5C.
- Boyd, James I.C. (1975) [1959]. The Festiniog Railway 1800 - 1974; Vol. 1 - History and Route. The British Narrow Gauge Railway. Blandford: The Oakwood Press. ISBN 978-0-85361-167-7. OCLC 2074549. B1A.
- Boyd, James I.C. (1975) [1959]. The Festiniog Railway 1800 - 1974; Vol. 2 - Locomotives and Rolling Stock; Quarries and Branches: Rebirth 1954-74. The British Narrow Gauge Railway. Blandford: The Oakwood Press. ISBN 978-0-85361-168-4. OCLC 874117875. B1B.
- Bradshaw, George (1968) [April 1910]. April 1910 Railway Guide. Newton Abbot: David & Charles. ISBN 978-0-7153-4246-6. OCLC 30645.
- Bradshaw, George (1985) [July 1922]. Bradshaw's General Railway and Steam Navigation guide for Great Britain and Ireland: A reprint of the July 1922 issue. Newton Abbot: David & Charles. ISBN 978-0-7153-8708-5. OCLC 12500436.
- Butt, R. V. J. (October 1995). The Directory of Railway Stations: details every public and private passenger station, halt, platform and stopping place, past and present (1st ed.). Sparkford: Patrick Stephens Ltd. ISBN 978-1-85260-508-7. OCLC 60251199. OL 11956311M.
- Christiansen, Rex (1976). Forgotten Railways: North and Mid Wales. Newton Abbot: David and Charles. ISBN 978-0-7153-7059-9.
- Clemens, Jim (2003) [1959]. North Wales Steam Lines (DVD). The Jim Clemens Collection No.6. Uffington, Shropshire: B&R Video Productions. Vol 79.
- Clemens, Jim (2014) [1959]. Steam to North Wales (DVD). Uffington, Shropshire: B&R Video Productions. Vol 136.
- Coleford, I. C. (October 2010). Smith, Martin (ed.). "By GWR to Blaenau Ffestiniog (Part One)". Railway Bylines. 15 (11). Radstock: Irwell Press Limited.
- Cowlishaw, Brian (2001) [1961]. North Wales Branches (DVD). Ultimate Archive Steam. Uffington, Shropshire: B&R Video Productions. Vol 38.
- Conolly, W. Philip (1998). British railways pre-grouping atlas and gazetteer (9th impression; 5th ed.). Shepperton: Ian Allan. ISBN 978-0-7110-0320-0. OCLC 221481275.
- Ferris, Tom (2004) [1961]. British Railways Volume 4 – Bewdley To Blaenau (DVD). demanddvd. DEMDVD084.
- Green, C.C. (1996) [1983]. North Wales Branch Line Album. Shepperton: Ian Allan Publishing. ISBN 978-0-7110-1252-3.
- Griffiths, Roger; Smith, Paul (1999). The Directory of British Engine Sheds and Principal Locomotive Servicing Points: 1 Southern England, the Midlands, East Anglia and Wales. OPC Railprint. ISBN 978-0-86093-542-1. OCLC 59458015.
- Johnson, Peter (1995). North Wales (Celebration of Steam). Shepperton: Ian Allan Publishing. ISBN 978-0-7110-2378-9.
- Johnson, Peter (1992). Portrait of the Festiniog. Shepperton: Ian Allan Publishing. ISBN 978-0-7110-2051-1.
- Jones, Ivor Wynne; Hatherill, Gordon (1977). Llechwedd and other Ffestiniog Railways. Blaenau Ffestiniog: Quarry Tours Ltd. ISBN 978-0-9502895-9-5.
- Jowett, Alan (2000). Jowett's Nationalised Railway Atlas (1st ed.). Penryn, Cornwall: Atlantic Transport Publishers. ISBN 978-0-906899-99-1. OCLC 228266687.
- Judge, Colin (2001). Great Western Stations - Volume Two, Wales. Railways in Profile. Caernarfon: Cheona Publications. ISBN 978-1-900298-15-5. No.12.
- Lloyd, Michael (May 1971). Brewer, John (ed.). "Bala to Blaenau Festiniog". Model Railway News. 47 (557). Hemel Hempstead: Model and Allied Publications Ltd.
- Messenger, Michael (2008). Slate Quarry Railways of Gwynedd. Truro: Twelveheads Press. ISBN 978-0-906294-68-0.
- Morton Lloyd, M.E. (April 1961). Cooke, B.W.C. (ed.). "Farewell to Bala-Blaenau Branch". The Railway Magazine. 107 (720). London: Tothill Press Limited. ISSN 0033-8923.
- Quick, Michael (2009) [2001]. Railway passenger stations in Great Britain: a chronology (4th ed.). Oxford: Railway & Canal Historical Society. ISBN 978-0-901461-57-5. OCLC 612226077.
- Rear, W.G. (2003). From Chester to Holyhead : The Branch Lines. Shepperton: Ian Allan Publishing. ISBN 978-0-86093-569-8.
- Riley, R.C. (1966). Great Western Album. London: Ian Allan Publishing. ISBN 978-0-7110-0073-5.
- Southern, D. W.; Leadbetter, H.J.; Weatherley, S.A. (1987). Rails to Bala. Rhuddlan: Charter Publications. ISBN 978-0-907157-03-8.
- "Western Branch Obituary". Talking of Trains. Trains Illustrated. Vol. 13, no. 142. Hampton Court: Ian Allan Publishing. July 1960. pp. 394–5.
- Turner, Alun (2003). Gwynedd's Lost Railways. Catrine: Stenlake Publishing. ISBN 978-1-84033-259-9.
