= Blaenau Ffestiniog Central railway station =

Railway station in Wales

Blaenau Ffestiniog Central
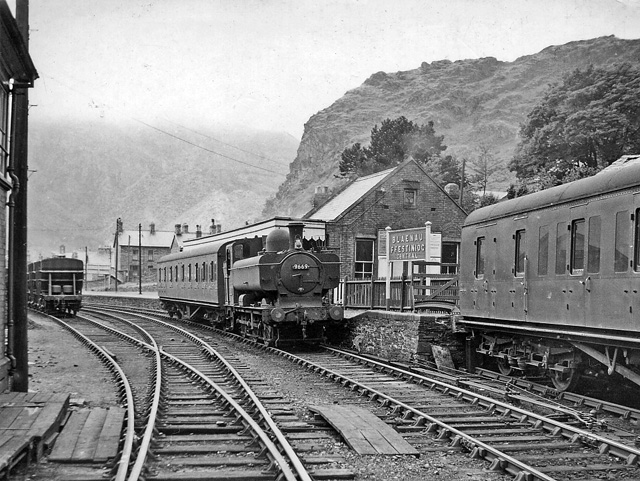
- Blaenau Ffestiniog Central in 1959

General information
- Location: Blaenau Ffestiniog, Gwynedd; Wales
- Coordinates: 52.9946°N 3.9372°W
- Grid reference: SH 700 459
- Platforms: 2 (one standard gauge, one narrow gauge)

Other information
- Status: Disused

History
- Original company: Bala and Festiniog Railway
- Pre-grouping: Great Western Railway
- Post-grouping: GWR

Key dates
- 10 September 1883: Opened as "Blaenau Festiniog"
- 18 September 1939: Festiniog Railway platform closed
- 18 June 1951: Renamed "Blaenau Ffestiniog Central"
- 4 January 1960: Closed to passengers
- 28 January 1961: Closed completely
Location

On 10 September 1883, the Bala and Festiniog Railway (B&FR) and the Festiniog Railway (FR) opened what would be known as an interchange station in Blaenau Ffestiniog, Merionethshire, Wales. Merionethshire is now part of the county of Gwynedd.

The station was initially named plain "Blaenau Festiniog" (without a second f), being renamed Blaenau Ffestiniog Central in 1951. It closed to passengers on 4 January 1960 and closed completely a year later. The B&FR was part of the Great Western Railway in all but name, becoming vested in the GWR in 1910.

== Context ==
The evolution of Blaenau's passenger stations was complex, with five different railway companies providing services to the area.

== Origins ==
The Festiniog Railway's narrow gauge line from Portmadoc to Duffws (FR) ran through the future site of Blaenau Ffestiniog Central from 1865, but there was no platform or stopping place. In 1868 the narrow gauge Festiniog and Blaenau Railway (F&BR) opened a line the three and a half miles from Llan Ffestiniog to Blaenau, making a junction with the FR a short distance west of the future Blaenau Ffestiniog Central, this junction - named Dolgarregddu Junction - was for goods only. The F&BR opened their Blaenau passenger terminus almost exactly in the site of the future Blaenau Ffestiniog Central; it was named Duffws (F&BR). From 1868 to 1883 there were therefore two wholly separate "Duffws" stations a short distance apart on opposite sides of Church Street. Passengers wishing to travel from (say) Bala to Tan-y-Bwlch could travel by horse-drawn coach to Llan Ffestiniog, then buy a through ticket, changing trains in Blaenau by walking the couple of hundred yards between the two Duffwses.

The standard gauge Great Western Railway (GWR), through the nominally independent Bala and Festiniog Railway, reached Llan Ffestiniog from Bala in 1882. A passenger from (say) Bala to Tan-y-Bwlch could buy a through ticket and change at Llan Ffestiniog by walking a short distance between the standard gauge GWR platform and the narrow gauge F&BR platform, then, on reaching Blaenau, change once more by walking from Duffws (F&BR) to Duffws (FR).

Later in 1882 the GWR (through the Bala and Festiniog Railway) set about replacing the narrow gauge Festiniog and Blaenau Railway with standard gauge tracks, this was relatively straightforward because the F&BR line had been built on narrow gauge tracks but within standard gauge infrastructure. Narrow gauge services continued until four days before change over by laying a third rail between the new standard gauge tracks. There were only two difficult areas - the wooden viaduct between Tan-y-Manod and Blaenau Ffestiniog Central-to-be.

The wooden viaduct was too flimsy and had to be replaced with a masonry structure.

The Duffws (F&BR) terminus posed a different set of problems; essentially, it was in the way. A temporary F&BR terminus was opened at Glynllifon Street, a couple of hundred yards short of Duffws, which was closed and razed to the ground to enable the new interchange station and sizable goods and slate-transfer yard to be built.

Although the new station was not finished, it was sufficiently ready to open on 10 September 1883. Dolgarreg Ddu Junction was no more because the FR and the line from Bala were different gauges, nevertheless, the passenger from Bala to Tan-y-Bwlch would henceforth merely change platforms at the new "Blaenau Festiniog".

== The station and slate wharves ==
The standard gauge platform was longer than the F&BR station it replaced and the narrow gauge platform was a new feature, but the passenger facilities were scarcely more than before. The goods facilities were another matter. The new platform featured a cattle loading dock at its southern end, but the goods yard was transformed. The site's footprint was constrained by the FR lines, the siding to Newborough Mills and existing buildings, so a great deal was crammed into a confined area, made tricky operationally because the standard gauge lines converged at a single, short headshunt at the northern end and a single track at the southern end. At Blaenau Ffestiniog North where narrow gauge met LNWR standard gauge the two sets of lines were laid so they never crossed, like sticking two table forks into each other end-to-end. The GWR/FR yard, by contrast, had standard gauge lines crossing, parallel to and abutting narrow gauge lines, this last because the slate transporter wagons used by the GWR were end-loading.

The goods yard was dominated by a goods shed with one narrow gauge line and one standard gauge line.

Three tracks stood opposite the standard gauge platform: the platform line, a run-round loop and a siding frequently used to house workmen's coaches. All three, the goods shed and the FR line were originally controlled by three signalboxes, one FR, north of its lines, one GWR and one GWR/FR joint, situated on the Vee platform. Operationally the FR became a Light Railway in 1923, sharply reducing its signalling infrastructure, so in 1926 the GWR replaced its original 'box and the joint 'box with the structure which survived until final closure in 1961.

To save space at Blaenau the engine shed for the north end of the line was three quarters of a mile away at Tan-y-Manod.

As nearby statuary records, the station was sometimes referred to locally as "Stesion Gret".

== The station as an interchange ==
As well as the three short-lived termini at Dinas (FR), Blaenau Ffestiniog (Pantyrafon) and Glynllifon Street there have been four passenger interchanges in Blaenau:

- from 1868 to 1883 the FR and F&BR partially co-ordinated timetables so passengers could make connections via a brisk walk between Duffws (FR) and Duffws (F&BR) stations
- the modern Blaenau Ffestiniog makes sustained efforts to provide for and promote traffic between the Conwy Valley Line and the revived FR
- the adjacent stations Stesion Fain and Blaenau Festiniog (LNWR, later LMSR) made demonstrable efforts from 1881 to 1939
- the best-equipped of the three was the GWR/FR joint station but those companies' efforts to promote interchange traffic were the feeblest.

The station was central to the town. It was level and V-shaped, with a single line for each company on each side of the V, giving interchange passengers the easiest possible transfer between platforms. In 1910, however, just one train from Portmadoc called, at 09:19. This connected with the 09:35 GWR train to Bala. No FR trains called in the opposite direction, connecting or otherwise.

The position had improved by 1922, when trains called from Portmadoc at 09:24 and 14:33, connecting with GWR trains departing at 09:30 and 14:35 respectively. In the opposite direction the GWR train terminating at 12:33 connected with the sole call on the FR platform at 12:37. Whether trains were held for late connections is not recorded. The FR's 1936 timetable for "Tourist" trains stated they "formed suitable connections with the L.M. and S. and G.W. Coys. in both directions at Blaenau Festiniog."

There was no discernible attempt to co-ordinate times so that someone travelling from (say) Bala to Betws-y-Coed could avoid a long sojourn in Blaenau, whether walking or using the FR to travel between the GWR and LNWR stations. 1950s evidence of station usage on the GWR line suggests the numbers were likely to have been very small anyway.

This bleak analysis hides the area's biggest passenger flows - workmen's trains - which did not appear in public timetables. In F&BR days these formed the bulk of passenger traffic and the railway's revenues. The GWR and BR(W) provided workmen's trains up to closure in 1960, as did the FR until its closure in 1939, evidence of these services meeting at the station is sought.

== Services ==
In 1931 the FR platform became the company's Blaenau terminus with the closure of Duffws (FR), this led to an increase in trains, but the service remained very limited as the FR struggled with declining traffic. The FR closed completely on the outbreak of the Second World War in 1939. Their passenger line became progressively overgrown, but their erstwhile goods line remained in use by the quarries, using their own staff and locomotives, to transport slate to the exchange yard at what would become Blaenau Ffestiniog North. This petered out over years, finally ending on 3 November 1962, after which the ever-decreasing amounts of slate were put onto lorries.

From 1939 the GWR and from 1948 the BR(W) were the sole users of the station. The goods yard held narrow gauge wagons throughout the 1950s, but evidence is sought whether they were active at any time after 1939.

The September 1959 timetable shows

- Northbound
  - three trains calling at all stations from Bala to Blaenau on Monday to Saturday
  - an extra evening train calling at all stations from Bala to Blaenau on Saturday
  - a Monday to Friday train calling at all stations from Bala to Trawsfynydd
    - The journey time from Bala to Blaenau was just over an hour and a half.
- Southbound
  - three trains calling at all stations from Blaenau to Bala on Monday to Saturday
  - two extra trains calling at all stations from Blaenau to Bala on Saturday
  - an extra train calling at all stations from Blaenau to Trawsfynydd on Saturday evening
  - a Monday to Friday train calling at all stations from Blaenau to Bala, except Llafar, Bryn-celynog and Cwm Prysor Halts
    - The journey time from Blaenau to Bala was around an hour and a quarter.
- There was no Sunday service.

After the Second World War most trains were composed of two carriages, with one regular out and back run comprising just one brake third coach of which a quarter was given over to space for the guard, his equipment and space for goods and parcels. At least one train along the line regularly ran as a mixed train, with a second between Bala and Arenig. By that time such trains had become rare on Britain's railways. Workmen's trains had been a feature of the line from the outset; they were the Festiniog and Blaenau Railway's biggest source of revenue. Such a service between Trawsfynydd and Blaenau Ffestiniog survived until the line's closure to passengers in 1960. Until 1930 at the earliest, such services used dedicated, lower standard, coaches which used a specific siding at Blaenau where the men boarded from and alighted to the ballast. A photograph from 1937 has been published which shows a train of six-coaches standing at the platform. Five of the coaches were clerestory, suggesting the service was at least partly for workmen.

The station handled some tourist traffic, one destination being Cynfal Falls a mile from Festiniog.

The line from Bala to Trawsfynydd was designated in the restrictive "Blue" weight limit, with the section from Trawsfynydd to Blaenau limited even more tightly to "Yellow". The literature conjectures on overweight classes being used on troop trains, but no solid claim or photograph has been published. Only three steam age photos of the line show anything other than an 0-4-2 or 0-6-0 tank engine, two being of GWR 2251 Class 0-6-0s taken in the 1940s. with a third being on a Dean 0-6-0 on a troop train in GWR days. As the 1950s passed "5700" and "7400" 0-6-PTs stole the show, exemplified by 9610 at Festiniog in the 1950s. 0-4-2T engines "..suffer[ed] from limited tank capacity and power."

== Closure and reopening ==
By the 1950s the line was deemed unremunerative. A survey undertaken in 1956 and 1957 found that the average daily numbers of passengers boarding and alighting were:

- Blaenau Ffestiniog Central 62 and 65
- Manod Halt 7 and 4
- Teigl Halt 5 and 5
- Festiniog 28 and 26
- Maentwrog Road 8 and 6
- Trawsfynydd Lake Halt 1 and 1
- Trawsfynydd 28 and 24
- Llafar Halt 2 and 2
- Bryn-celynog Halt 2 and 2
- Cwm Prysor Halt 3 and 3
- Arenig 5 and 5
- Capel Celyn Halt 7 and 8
- Tyddyn Bridge Halt 4 and 6
- Frongoch 18 and 15
- Bala 65 and 58

Military traffic had ended and, apart from a finite contract to bring cement to Blaenau in connection with the construction of Ffestiniog Power Station freight traffic was not heavy, most arriving and leaving Bala did so from and to the south and that to Blaenau could be handled from the Conwy Valley Line northwards.

In 1957 Parliament authorised Liverpool Corporation to flood a section of the line by damming the Afon Tryweryn. Monies were made available to divert the route round the dam, but it was decided that improving the road from Bala to Llan Ffestiniog would be of greater benefit. Road transport alternatives were established for groups such as schoolchildren and workers. The plans afoot for rail serving Trawsfynydd nuclear power station were to be catered for by building the long-discussed cross-town link between the two Blaenau standard gauge stations. The estimated financial savings to be made were £23,300 by withdrawing the passenger service and £7000 in renewal charges.

The last timetabled passenger trains ran on Saturday 2 January 1960, with formal closure to passengers on Monday the 4th. A special "last train" ran from Bala to Blaenau Ffestiniog Central and return on 22 January 1961. Closure to goods on 28 January 1961.

== Reuse ==
The track south from the station to Trawsfynydd was mothballed in anticipation of opening for nuclear traffic and to accommodate the faint possibility of further military traffic to Trawsfynydd Camp.

The station buildings were demolished in the early 1960s, but the standard gauge platform remained in place. The cross-town link was built, passing the disused platform but not adjacent to it. The link enabled trains from the Conwy Valley Line to access the mothballed line from Blaenau southwards to a siding near the site of Trawsfynydd Lake Halt where a large ("Goliath") gantry was erected to load and unload traffic for the then new Trawsfynydd nuclear power station. The link and the mothballed line were reopened on 20 April 1964, the main goods transported were nuclear fuel rods carried in nuclear flasks. The line was also used during the late 1980s for freight traffic to a siding at Maentwrog Road serving the explosives factory in Penrhyndeudraeth.

Passenger trains briefly returned through the station site in 1989 to a temporary platform at Maentwrog Road. These trains ran for one summer in an attempt to encourage tourism at the power station. Few people used the service to visit the power station (most people travelled "for the ride") so the following year tourist trains drove to the line's terminus then reversed, with no-one getting on or off. This service lasted until the end of the 1990 Summer season. This reopening to passengers enabled rail tours to run from other parts of the country, which they did from time to time until closure in 1998.

This second closure led to a second special "last train" - the "Trawsfynydd Lament" ran southwards to the limit of line at the power station loading point on 17 October 1998, the line having become redundant following removal of all nuclear material.

== The Ffestiniog Railway returns ==
The Festiniog Railway closed in 1946. In the mid-1950s visionary preservationists started the herculean task of rebuilding the line, primarily as a tourist railway. The FR had always had a track between their Stesion Fain and what became Blaenau Ffestiniog Central, they also owned the land beneath. In the 19th century they used this to block extensions southeast by the LNWR or northwest by the GWR which would have threatened their hold on their core business: slate traffic. Although the FR closed in 1946, it was not dissolved, meaning the preservationists had this line of route through the heart of Blaenau. They used this to facilitate rather than block radical change in the early 1960s, coming to an accommodation with British Railways whereby BR would build their cross-town link from Blaenau Ffestiniog North through the remains of Blaenau Ffestiniog Central in such a way that room could be found for the FR to fit alongside if and when it returned to Blaenau.

Twenty years later the cross-town link was slewed to the north and FR rails were laid alongside to their south, both leading to a brand new interchange station on the site of Blaenau Ffestiniog Central, which had itself been built on the site of Duffws (F&BR) station almost a hundred years earlier. The standard gauge part opened on 22 March 1982, followed by the FR part on 25 May 1982.

== The site today ==
The modern Blaenau Ffestiniog stands on the station site. It is in regular use by both standard gauge and narrow gauge trains. The extension south to Trawsfynydd nuclear power station remains protected from demolition and blockage, but is heavily overgrown in places.

== The future ==
Between 2000 and 2011 there were at least two attempts to put the power station extension to use. In 2011 there were proposals to use the rails as a recreational velorail track. Neither this nor the earlier idea came to anything. The possibility remains that the surviving line could see future preservation or reuse by the nuclear industry.

To considerable local surprise, fresh moves to reopen the line from Blaenau as far south as Trawsfynydd began in September 2016, with the formation of The Trawsfynydd & Blaenau Ffestiniog Community Railway Company. On 21 September at least one regional newspaper reported that "Volunteers are set to start work this weekend on clearing vegetation from the trackbed between Blaenau Ffestiniog and Trawsfynydd." The company was quoted as saying "We have been given a licence by Network Rail to clear and survey the line." By March 2017 clearance of the section of line between Blaenau Ffestiniog and Cwmbowydd level crossing was 97% complete.

| Preceding station | Heritage railways | Following station |
Disused railways
| Blaenau Festiniog Junction (Stesion Fain) towards Porthmadog Harbour | Ffestiniog Railway 1883–1931 | Duffws Terminus |
| Blaenau Festiniog Junction (Stesion Fain) towards Porthmadog Harbour | Ffestiniog Railway 1931–1939 | Terminus |
| Terminus | Great Western Railway | Manod |

== Further material ==
- Cowlishaw, Brian (2001) [1961]. North Wales Branches (DVD). Ultimate Archive Steam. Uffington, Shropshire: B&R Video Productions. Vol 38.
- Rear, W.G. (1991). Conway Valley Line - Blaenau Ffestiniog to Llandudno Junction. Scenes from the Past, Railways of North Wales. Stockport: Foxline Publishing. ISBN 978-1-870119-14-6. No. 12.
- Shannon, Paul; Hillmer, John (1999). North Wales (British Railways Past & Present) Part 2. Kettering: Past & Present Publishing Ltd. ISBN 978-1-85895-163-8. No 36.
- "Slate wagon transporter". Model Railway Constructor. 33 (382). Shepperton: Ian Allan Publishing. February 1966.
- "GWR slate wagon (tram)". Model Railway Constructor. 33 (387). Shepperton: Ian Allan Publishing. July 1966.
