= Tanygrisiau railway station =

Railway station in Gwynedd, Wales

Tanygrisiau
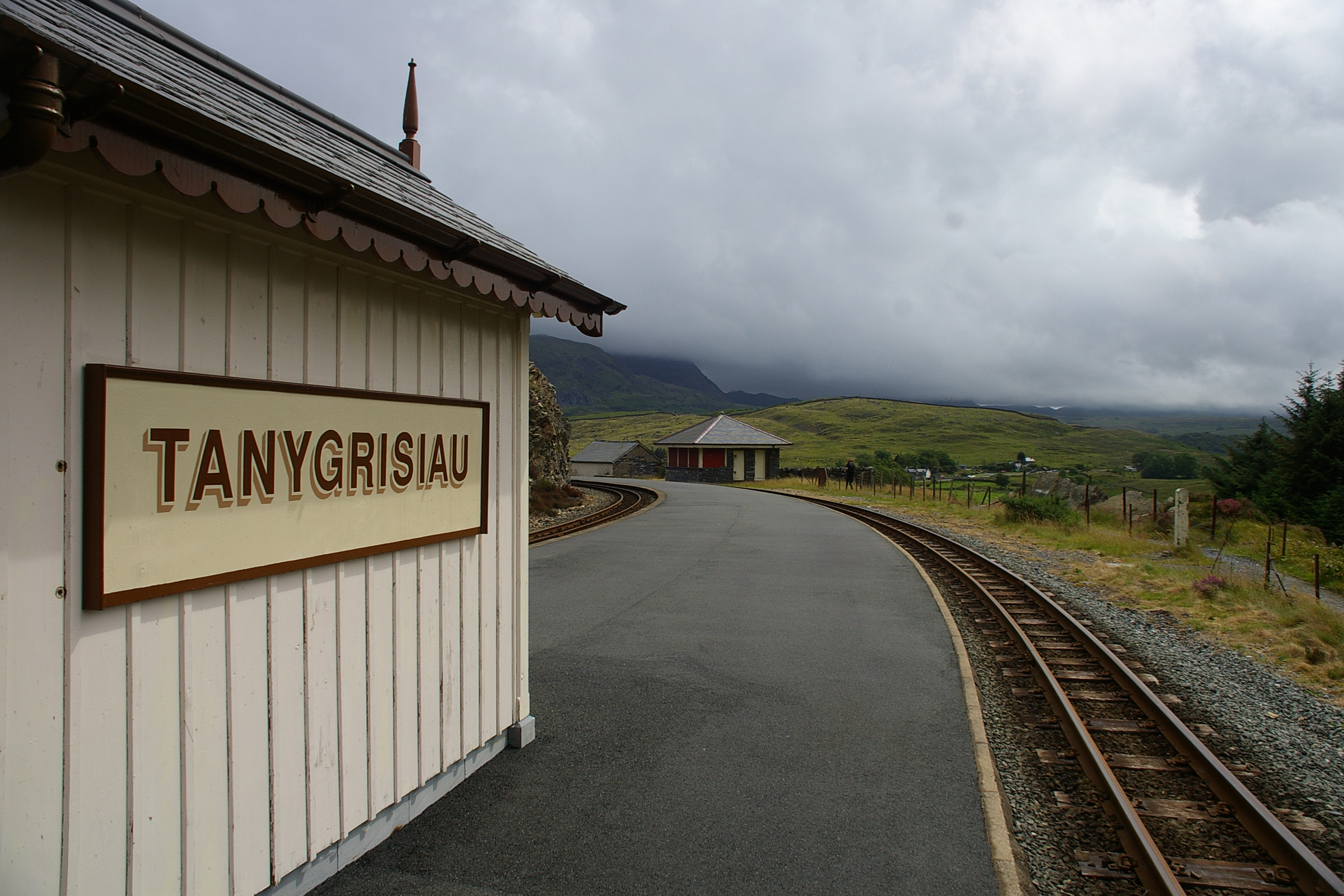

General information
- Location: Tanygrisiau, Gwynedd; Wales
- Coordinates: 52.98580°N 3.96303°W
- Grid reference: SH683449
- System: Station on heritage railway
- Owner: Festiniog Railway Company
- Manager: Ffestiniog Railway
- Platforms: 2

Key dates
- 1866: Station opened
- 15 September 1939: Closed to passengers
- 24 June 1978: Present station opened on different alignment
Location

Tanygrisiau railway station (grid reference SH683449) is a passenger station on the narrow gauge Ffestiniog Railway The line was built in 1836 to carry dressed slate from Blaenau Ffestiniog to Porthmadog for export by sea but official passenger services began in 1865.

The station serves the slate mining village of Tanygrisiau and was opened in March 1866. It closed to passengers on 15 September 1939. The new station opened for passenger traffic on 24 June 1978 and was the passenger terminus until 25 May 1982. Tanygrisiau station is at a height of 669 ft (204 m) and a distance of 12 miles 10 chains (19.5 km) from Porthmadog.

The new station is on a different alignment and grade from the old, the two alignments joining just to the north of the Blaenau end of the station. The old line was on a continuous downward gradient from that point through the station, but the new line is on an uphill gradient (to pass the nearby power station) and is more sharply curved. One of the old buildings still remains, visibly lower than the new trackbed.

Tanygrisiau station has an operational passing loop but is normally operated as an unstaffed halt and trains only call on request. Intending passengers are advised to check with the Ffestiniog Railway Company before embarking on their journey.

The station is close to the Cwmorthin water falls, and the train passes Tanygrisiau hydro-electric pumped-storage power station and Llyn Ystradau.

== Services ==
Preceding station	Heritage railways	Following station
Dduallt towards Porthmadog Harbour	Ffestiniog Railway 1982–present	Blaenau Ffestiniog Terminus
Historical railways
Dduallt towards Porthmadog Harbour	Ffestiniog Railway 1865–1870	Dinas Terminus
Dduallt towards Porthmadog Harbour	Ffestiniog Railway 1866–1881	Duffws Terminus
Dduallt towards Porthmadog Harbour	Ffestiniog Railway 1881–1931	Blaenau Festiniog Junction (Stesion Fain) towards Duffws
Dduallt towards Porthmadog Harbour	Ffestiniog Railway 1931–1939	Blaenau Festiniog Junction (Stesion Fain) towards Blaenau Ffestiniog Central

== Sources ==
- Boyd, James I.C. (1975) [1959]. The Festiniog Railway 1800 - 1974; Vol. 1 - History and Route. The British Narrow Gauge Railway. Blandford: The Oakwood Press. ISBN 978-0-85361-167-7. OCLC 2074549. B1A.
- Boyd, James I.C. (1975) [1959]. The Festiniog Railway 1800 - 1974; Vol. 2 - Locomotives and Rolling Stock; Quarries and Branches: Rebirth 1954-74. The British Narrow Gauge Railway. Blandford: The Oakwood Press. ISBN 978-0-85361-168-4. OCLC 874117875. B1B.
- Brian Hollingsworth: Ffestiniog Adventure - The Festiniog Railway's Deviation Project, 1981.
- J.G.V.Mitchell & A.G.W.Garraway; Return to Blaenau 1970–82, 2001
- The Ffestiniog Railway Company's website
- Ffestiniog Railway Timetables
