= Duffws railway station =

Duffws railway station may refer to:

- Duffws railway station (Festiniog Railway)
- Duffws railway station (Festiniog and Blaenau Railway)
