= Diphwys railway station =

Disused railway station in Wales

Diphwys

General information
- Location: Blaenau Ffestiniog, Gwynedd; Wales
- Coordinates: 52.9946°N 3.9373°W
- Grid reference: SH 700 458
- Platforms: 0

Other information
- Status: Disused

History
- Original company: Festiniog and Blaenau Railway

Key dates
- 30 May 1868: Opened
- Spring 1883: Last passenger train called
- 10 September 1883: Standard gauge replacement opened
Location

Diphwys railway station was on the same site as the later Great Western Railway station in the heart of Blaenau Ffestiniog in what was then Merionethshire, now Gwynedd, Wales.

== Context ==
The evolution of Blaenau's passenger stations was complex with five different railway companies providing services to the area.

Diphwys was the northern passenger terminus of the 1 ft 11 3/4 in (603 mm) narrow gauge Festiniog and Blaenau Railway (F&BR); it opened with the line on 30 May 1868. The F&BR ran the three and a half route miles northwards from its southern terminus at Llan Ffestiniog to a junction with the Ffestiniog Railway (FR) at Dolgarregddu Junction about 10 chains (200 m) north west of Diphwys (F&BR) station. Freight trains passed between the FR and F&BR at Dolgarregddu Junction, but not passenger trains.

The station was a passenger station, whose main but not sole traffic was quarrymen travelling to and from work. There was a coal siding, a private siding and a run-round loop, but the warehouse and extensive interchange sidings came later with the station's standard gauge replacement.

In common with all other F&BR stations there were no platforms, as carriages were very low to the ground passengers boarded from and alighted to the trackside. Only one photograph of the station has been published. The location is indisputable, with the Queens Hotel in the background. The station building in view looks like weatherboarding, which could explain the corrugated appearance of the other F&BR stations, no published photo of which was taken close-up. The only description of the station building in print reads "Duffws was a stone building, suitably semi-pretentious enough to house the Company's offices! That was about all, there being no platform, only a run round loop and, beyond the station, a single siding for coal. A lane ran up beside the station towards the Queens Hotel to reach the main street; across and over on the other side was (for the first year or two anyway) the even more primitive station of the Festiniog Railway." It is possible that the stone building was later than the photo, or off-shot, but it is not visible in the published photograph.

Diphwys (F&BR) station and the Ffestiniog Railway's Duffws (FR) station were completely separate entities, run by different companies on opposite sides of Church Street. Although officially spelled differently, both could be referred to in contemporary literature simply as "Duffws". To compound the potential for confusion contemporary F&BR sources sometimes referred to their station in Blaenau not as Diphwys, but as "Dinas", though timetables used "Diphwys". The FR also had a Dinas station in another part of Blaenau and a third Dinas station came later with the Welsh Highland Railway, giving more opportunities for bewilderment. Quick, uniquely, refers to the station as plain "Blaenau".

== Services ==
The February 1878 timetable shows that all trains called at all stations on the line, with

- Northbound ("Up")
  - four public trains running Monday to Saturday
  - an unadvertised morning workmen's train running Monday to Saturday
  - two public evening trains on Saturdays only
    - The journey time from Festiniog to Duffws was 20 minutes.
- Southbound ("Down")
  - four public trains running Monday to Saturday
  - a morning workmen's train running Monday to Saturday
  - two public evening trains on Saturdays only
  - a teatime workmen's train on Saturdays only
    - The journey time from Duffws to Festiniog was 20 minutes.
- There was no Sunday service.

Through passengers from (say) Tyddyngwyn to Porthmadog Harbour would alight at the F&BR's Diphwys station and walk across Church Street in Blaenau to the Festiniog Railway's Duffws station. Most trains were timetabled to make this process workable, if tight. Whether connecting trains were held in the case of late running is not recorded.

In the line's early days many trains were "mixed", but this was stopped in 1877. Unlike most railways in the area passengers were the line's mainstay. In 1879 - a typical year - passenger receipts were £1406 compared with £416 for goods. No figures have been published specifically for Duffws.

== The standard gauge approaches ==
On 1 September 1882 the standard gauge Bala and Festiniog Railway reached Llan Ffestiniog from the south, enabling a passenger from (say) Bala to Duffws to transfer from a standard gauge train to a narrow gauge train at Llan by walking a few yards, much as modern-day passengers transfer between Conwy Valley Line and Ffestiniog Railway trains at Blaenau Ffestiniog.

From April the following year the narrow gauge line was converted to standard gauge. Narrow gauge trains continued to operate during the conversion, using a third rail. The rebuilding at Diphwys was total, with the F&BR infrastructure obliterated and the site extended, though the Ffestiniog Railway's tracks which passed to the north of the site were sacrosanct. One source (only) indicates that for a period during the rebuilding Diphwyss (F&BR) station closed, with a temporary terminus provided between Glynllifon Street. and Cwmbowydd Road. Narrow gauge trains ceased running on 5 September 1883 with standard gauge services beginning on 10 September 1883. Duffws (F&BR) station was closed permanently when the narrow gauge ended, being replaced by a standard gauge station known initially as Blaenau Festiniog, later as Blaenau Ffestiniog, later still as Blaenau Ffestiniog Central and locally as Blaenau GWR.

== The line reopened ==
The standard gauge line through the site of Diphwys (F&BR) station closed to passengers in 1960 and completely in 1961 but it was mothballed pending building the long-discussed cross-town link to enable trains to run along the Conwy Valley Line, through Blaenau and on to Trawsfynydd nuclear power station which was then being built. This link was built and a new line through the site opened on 24 April 1964, but none of Blaenau Ffestiniog Central's facilities were brought back to life.

Spectacular change occurred in 1982 when two wholly new stations were built side by side on the site. On 22 March 1982 the ex-LNWR station was closed, being replaced by a wholly new build station on the former Ffestiniog Railway trackbed at Dolgarregddu Junction, yards from the site of Diphwys (F&BR), then on 25 May 1982 the Ffestiniog Railway opened a wholly new station very close to where Duffws (F&BR) had been. Through traffic to the nuclear plant and occasional passenger specials continued to pass through Diphwys' long built-over site using the standard gauge line which covered the F&BR trackbed.

The line south of the Diphwys (F&BR) site closed again in 1998 as the nuclear plant was being decommissioned. Once more the route was mothballed in case a future use is found.

== The station site in the 21st Century ==
In Summer 2016 the Network Rail and Ffestiniog Railway stations on the Diphwys (F&BR) site were still going strong. The overgrown, mothballed and protected single track line still ran south of the site to the former nuclear flask loading point.

== The future ==
Between 2000 and 2011 there were at least two attempts to put the line south of the Diphwys site to use. In 2011 there were proposals to use the rails as a recreational velorail track. Neither this nor the earlier idea came to anything. The possibility remains that the surviving line could see future preservation or reuse by the nuclear industry.

To considerable local surprise fresh moves to reopen the line from Blaenau as far south as Trawsfynydd began in September 2016, with the formation of The Trawsfynydd & Blaenau Ffestiniog Community Railway Company. On 21 September at least one regional newspaper reported that "Volunteers are set to start work this weekend on clearing vegetation from the trackbed between Blaenau Ffestiniog and Trawsfynydd." The company was quoted as saying "We have been given a licence by Network Rail to clear and survey the line."

Preceding station	Disused railways	Following station
Terminus	Festiniog and Blaenau Railway; Narrow gauge	Tan-y-Manod; Line and station closed

== Further material ==
- Boyd, James I.C. (October 1959). Mansell, K.G. (ed.). "Bala & Festiniog Section - W.R.". Railway World. 20 (233). London: Railway World Limited.
- Christiansen, Rex (1976). Forgotten Railways: North and Mid Wales. Newton Abbot: David & Charles. ISBN 978-0-7153-7059-9.
- Coleford, I. C. (October 2010). Smith, Martin (ed.). "By GWR to Blaenau Ffestiniog (Part One)". Railway Bylines. 15 (11). Radstock: Irwell Press Limited.
- Coleford, I. C. (November 2010). Smith, Martin (ed.). "By GWR to Blaenau Ffestiniog (Part Two)". Railway Bylines. 15 (12). Radstock: Irwell Press Limited.
- Ferris, Tom (2004) [1961]. British Railways Volume 4 - Bewdley To Blaenau (DVD). demanddvd. DEMDVD084.
- Green, C.C. (1996) [1983]. North Wales Branch Line Album. Shepperton: Ian Allan Publishing. ISBN 978-0-7110-1252-3.
- Morton Lloyd, M.E. (April 1961). Cooke, B.W.C. (ed.). "Farewell to Bala-Blaenau Branch". The Railway Magazine. 107 (720). London: Tothill Press Limited. ISSN 0033-8923.
- Richards, Alun John (2001). The Slate Railways of Wales. Llanrwst: Gwasg Carreg Gwalch. ISBN 978-0-86381-689-5.
- Southern, D. W. (1995). Bala Junction to Blaenau Ffestiniog (Scenes from the Past, Railways of North Wales, No. 25). Stockport: Foxline Publishing. ISBN 978-1-870119-34-4.
- Turner, Alun (2003). Gwynedd's Lost Railways. Catrine: Stenlake Publishing. ISBN 978-1-84033-259-9.
