= Blaenau Festiniog Junction railway station =

Disused railway station in Gwynedd, Wales

Blaenau Festiniog Junction

General information
- Location: Blaenau Ffestiniog, Gwynedd; Wales
- Coordinates: 52.9956°N 3.9445°W
- Grid reference: SH 695 460
- Platforms: 1

Other information
- Status: Disused

History
- Original company: Festiniog Railway

Key dates
- 1 April 1881: Opened
- 18 September 1939: Closed
Location

Blaenau Festiniog Junction railway station (also known as Stesion Fain railway station) was the Festiniog Railway (FR)'s third of eventually five passenger stations in Blaenau Ffestiniog, then in Merionethshire, now in Gwynedd, Wales.

== History ==
Stesion Fain opened on 1 April 1881 between Tanygrisiau and the line's northern terminus at Duffws (FR). It was aimed primarily at exchange traffic with the LNWR's Conwy Valley Line station which opened a few yards away on the opposite side of North Western Road on the same day. Target customers could be travelling from (say) Porthmadog to Llandudno or from Betws-y-Coed to Tan-y-Bwlch. A few could be travelling from (say) Rhyl via Llandudno Junction to Duffws (FR), using the FR for the last leg.

== Naming ==
The station's nameboards declared the station to be Blaenau Festiniog Junction, with the anglicised single "F", but

- the station was not at or near a passenger junction
- locally it was known as "Stesion Fain" (Narrow Station), often misspelled as "Stesion Fein"
- in FR material and Bradshaw's FR timetable it appeared as "Blaenau Festiniog (L&NW)" (i.e. connection for the LNWR)
- Bradshaw's LNWR timetable mentions it only by inference by citing a page number.
- One authoritative source refers to the station as "Blaenau Ffestiniog exchange" (lower case "e") whilst another uses "Blaenau Ffestiniog Exchange (LNWR)"

== Interchange traffic ==
The FR sought to tap custom not only from Blaenau Ffestiniog itself, but also its wider connections. It co-operated with the LNWR whose southern terminus was an underarm stone's throw away on the opposite side of North Western Road. Timetabling was sympathetic; in 1910, for example, three of the FR's four non-workmen's trains from Porthmadog Harbour arrived between 27 and 42 minutes before an LNWR train headed north, giving a traveller from (say) Tan-y-Bwlch a good chance of getting to Dolgarrog even if his first train was 15 minutes late. Bradshaw may have been mealy-mouthed about the proximity of the FR station, but the LNW station boasted a very large station nameboard proclaiming "BLAENAU FESTINIOG CHANGE HERE FOR NARROW GAUGE LINE TO MINFFORD AND PORTMADOC". The FR's 1936 timetable for "Tourist" trains stated they "formed suitable connections with the L.M. and S. and G.W. Coys. in both directions at Blaenau Festiniog."

== Station buildings ==
The station had one very low platform, similar to that at Duffws (FR), a metal waiting shelter with a slate roof and small buildings at both ends, with that at the Tan-y-Grisiau end containing a refreshment room, opposite and a few yards west of which stood a slate water tower topped with a metal tank.

== The wilderness years ==
The station stood derelict for some years after closure in 1939, being progressively demolished by the elements, vandals and eventually officialdom. The water tower lived a charmed life, outliving the station buildings. The site seemed doomed when road alterations buried a stretch of the track in 1963. In 1956 the waiting shelter was dismantled and re-erected for use by spectators at Manod Football Club, though it was replaced in turn in the 2000s by a more modern structure.

For a period in the 1970s the FR locomotive "Princess" was mounted on a plinth at the station site as a symbol of remembrance and intention to return.

== Modern times ==
The station site was a serious contender for the location of the Ffestiniog Railway's return to Blaenau, the location remained as first built, back-to-back with the ex-LNWR Blaenau Ffestiniog North which was the town's sole surviving station from 1960. In the event, in 1982 both British Railways (BR) and the FR opened wholly new stations on the site of Blaenau Ffestiniog Central, meaning that the narrow gauge line through Blaenau Festiniog Junction was reinstated, but the station was not. The site is commemorated with a raised flowerbed.

Preceding station	Heritage railways	Following station
Disused railways
Tanygrisiau towards Porthmadog Harbour	Ffestiniog Railway 1881–1883	Duffws Terminus
Tanygrisiau towards Porthmadog Harbour	Ffestiniog Railway 1883–1931	Blaenau Ffestiniog Central towards Duffws
Tanygrisiau towards Porthmadog Harbour	Ffestiniog Railway 1931–1939	Blaenau Ffestiniog Central Terminus

== Bibliography ==
- Boyd, James I.C. (1975) [1959]. The Festiniog Railway 1800 - 1974; Vol. 1 - History and Route. The British Narrow Gauge Railway. Blandford: The Oakwood Press. ISBN 978-0-85361-167-7. OCLC 2074549. B1A.
- Boyd, James I.C. (1975) [1959]. The Festiniog Railway 1800 - 1974; Vol. 2 - Locomotives and Rolling Stock; Quarries and Branches: Rebirth 1954-74. The British Narrow Gauge Railway. Blandford: The Oakwood Press. ISBN 978-0-85361-168-4. OCLC 874117875. B1B.
- Butt, R. V. J. (October 1995). The Directory of Railway Stations: details every public and private passenger station, halt, platform and stopping place, past and present (1st ed.). Sparkford: Patrick Stephens Ltd. ISBN 978-1-85260-508-7. OCLC 60251199. OL 11956311M.
- Bradshaw, George (1968) [April 1910]. April 1910 Railway Guide. Newton Abbot: David & Charles. ISBN 978-0-7153-4246-6. OCLC 30645.
- Bradshaw, George (1985) [July 1922]. Bradshaw's General Railway and Steam Navigation guide for Great Britain and Ireland: A reprint of the July 1922 issue. Newton Abbot: David & Charles. ISBN 978-0-7153-8708-5. OCLC 12500436.
- Clemens, Jim (2014) [1959]. Steam to North Wales (DVD). Uffington, Shropshire: B&R Video Productions. Vol 136.
- Mitchell, Vic; Smith, Keith (2010). Bala to Llandudno: Featuring Blaenau Ffestiniog. Midhurst: Middleton Press (MD). ISBN 978-1-906008-87-1.
- Peddie, Donald (2014). A North Wales Railway Travelogue. Lydney: Lightmoor Press. ISBN 978-1-899889-92-1.
- Prideaux, J.D.C.A. (1982). The Welsh narrow gauge railway: A pictorial history (2nd ed.). Newton Abbot: David and Charles. ISBN 978-0-7153-8354-4.
- Quick, Michael (2009) [2001]. Railway passenger stations in Great Britain: a chronology (4th ed.). Oxford: Railway & Canal Historical Society. ISBN 978-0-901461-57-5. OCLC 612226077.
- Rear, W.G. (1991). Conway Valley Line - Blaenau Ffestiniog to Llandudno Junction. Scenes from the Past, Railways of North Wales. Stockport: Foxline Publishing. ISBN 978-1-870119-14-6. No. 12.
- Richards, Alun John (2001). The Slate Railways of Wales. Llanrwst: Gwasg Carreg Gwalch. ISBN 978-0-86381-689-5.
- Stretton, M.J. (1999). Ffestiniog Railway in Camera: One Hundred Years 1871-1971. Penistone: Challenger Publications. ISBN 978-1-899624-40-9.
- Welbourn, Nigel (2000). Lost Lines: British Narrow Gauge. Shepperton: Ian Allan Publishing. ISBN 978-0-7110-2742-8.
