= Glynllifon Street railway station =

Railway station in Blaenau Ffestiniog, Wales

Glynllifon Street

General information
- Location: Blaenau Ffestiniog, Gwynedd; Wales
- Coordinates: 52.9934°N 3.9338°W
- Grid reference: SH 702 457
- Platforms: 0

Other information
- Status: Disused

History
- Original company: Festiniog and Blaenau Railway

Key dates
- July 1882: Opened
- 5 September 1883: Last passenger train called
- 10 September 1883: Replacement standard gauge Blaenau Festiniog station opened
Location

Glynllifon Street railway station was a temporary northern terminus station of the Festiniog and Blaenau Railway (F&BR), sited between the street of the same name and Cwmbowydd Road in Blaenau Ffestiniog. It was never named.

== Context ==
The evolution of Blaenau's passenger stations was complex, with five different railway companies providing services to the area.

== History ==
From May 1882 to September 1883 the 1 ft 11 3/4 in (603 mm) narrow gauge F&BR was rebuilt as a standard gauge line. Narrow gauge services continued throughout the rebuilding by laying a third rail on the sleepers. At the line's northern end, however, the scale and complexity of replacing the line's Duffws (F&BR) terminus and goods yard made it impossible to continue to meet passengers' needs, so the F&BR's terminus was closed on 1 November 1882 and a temporary terminus was provided between Glynllifon Street (an area also known as Fourcrosses) and Cwmbowydd Road, approximately 10 chains (200 m) short of Diphwys.

The temporary station is only named in one published source, which refers to a published postcard showing a train at the station. One source states that narrow gauge services continued 'to a temporary terminus just short of Dolgarregddu' No hint of its existence is given in the standard work on the F&BR. Indirect evidence that the station existed can be inferred from the fact that the F&BR's other stations remained open after the closure of the F&BR's Blaenau terminus. No source suggests that Tan-y-Manod became the temporary terminus, indeed, the F&BR went to trouble and expense to provide a temporary track to bipass Bethania viaduct whist it was being rebuilt..

The station had no platforms, in common with all other F&BR stations. Carriages were very low to the ground, so passengers boarded from and alighted to the trackside.

== Closure ==
Narrow gauge trains ceased running on 5 September 1883 with standard gauge services beginning on 10 September 1883. The temporary station was closed permanently when the narrow gauge ended, being replaced by a permanent terminus initially known as "Blaenau Festiniog" on the site of the former Diphwys (F&BR) terminus. The terminus was renamed Blaenau Ffestiniog Central in 1951, closed to passenger traffic in January 1960 and closed completely in January 1961.

== The line reopened ==
The line through the site of the temporary station closed in 1961 but it was mothballed pending building the long-discussed cross-town link to enable trains to run along the Conwy Valley Line, through Blaenau and on to Trawsfynydd nuclear power station which was then being built. The line through the site reopened on 24 April 1964, but none of the station's facilities were brought back to life. The line closed again in 1998 as the nuclear plant was being decommissioned. Once more the route was mothballed in case a future use is found.

== The station site in the 21st Century ==
By 2011 no hint of the station remained. In Spring 2016 the mothballed single track line still ran past the site to the former nuclear flask loading point.

== The future ==
Between 2000 and 2011 there were at least two attempts to put the mothballed line through the site to use. In 2011 there were proposals to use the rails as a recreational velorail track. Neither this nor the earlier idea came to anything. The possibility remains that the surviving line could see future preservation or reuse by the nuclear industry.

To considerable local surprise fresh moves to reopen the line from Blaenau as far south as Trawsfynydd began in September 2016, with the formation of The Trawsfynydd & Blaenau Ffestiniog Community Railway Company. On 21 September at least one regional newspaper reported that "Volunteers are set to start work this weekend on clearing vegetation from the trackbed between Blaenau Ffestiniog and Trawsfynydd." The company was quoted as saying "We have been given a licence by Network Rail to clear and survey the line."

Preceding station	Disused railways	Following station
Terminus	Festiniog and Blaenau Railway; Narrow gauge	Tan-y-Manod Line and station closed

== Further material ==
- Boyd, James I.C. (October 1959). Mansell, K.G. (ed.). "Bala & Festiniog Section - W.R.". Railway World. 20 (233). London: Railway World Limited.
- Christiansen, Rex (1976). Forgotten Railways: North and Mid Wales. Newton Abbot: David and Charles. ISBN 978-0-7153-7059-9.
- Coleford, I. C. (October 2010). Smith, Martin (ed.). "By GWR to Blaenau Ffestiniog (Part One)". Railway Bylines. 15 (11). Radstock: Irwell Press Limited.
- Coleford, I. C. (November 2010). Smith, Martin (ed.). "By GWR to Blaenau Ffestiniog (Part Two)". Railway Bylines. 15 (12). Radstock: Irwell Press Limited.
- Ferris, Tom (2004) [1961]. British Railways Volume 4 - Bewdley To Blaenau (DVD). demanddvd. DEMDVD084.
- Green, C.C. (1996) [1983]. North Wales Branch Line Album. Shepperton: Ian Allan Publishing. ISBN 978-0-7110-1252-3.
- Mitchell, Vic; Smith, Keith (2010). Bala to Llandudno: Featuring Blaenau Ffestiniog. Midhurst: Middleton Press (MD). ISBN 978-1-906008-87-1.
- Morton Lloyd, M.E. (April 1961). Cooke, B.W.C. (ed.). "Farewell to Bala-Blaenau Branch". The Railway Magazine. 107 (720). London: Tothill Press Limited. ISSN 0033-8923.
- Richards, Alun John (2001). The Slate Railways of Wales. Llanrwst: Gwasg Carreg Gwalch. ISBN 978-0-86381-689-5.
- Southern, D. W. (1995). Bala Junction to Blaenau Ffestiniog (Scenes from the Past, Railways of North Wales, No. 25). Stockport: Foxline Publishing. ISBN 978-1-870119-34-4.
- Turner, Alun (2003). Gwynedd's Lost Railways. Catrine: Stenlake Publishing. ISBN 978-1-84033-259-9.
