= Dinas railway station (Festiniog Railway) =

Former railway station in Wales

Dinas (FR)

General information
- Location: Blaenau Ffestiniog, Gwynedd; Wales
- Coordinates: 52.9991°N 3.9476°W
- Grid reference: SH 693 464
- Platforms: 1

Other information
- Status: Disused

History
- Original company: Festiniog Railway

Key dates
- 6 January 1865: Opened
- August 1870: Closed
Location

Dinas station was built by the Festiniog Railway (FR). It was the first passenger station in Blaenau Ffestiniog, then in Merionethshire, now in Gwynedd, Wales. This station is not to be confused with Dinas some miles distant on the Welsh Highland Railway; nor is it to be confused with the Festiniog and Blaenau Railway's northern terminus in the centre of Blaenau Ffestiniog which was sometimes referred to colloquially as "Dinas".

== Context ==
The evolution of Blaenau's passenger stations was complex, with five different railway companies providing services to the area.

== Opening ==
The station opened on 6 January 1865, carrying passengers to Portmadoc and points between. This was the first steam-hauled passenger service in Britain to use tracks of less than Standard Gauge, with the line carrying a quarter of a million people in its first year of operation. The station's first stationmaster was Mr John Lloyd, the initial service was five trains to and from Portmadoc each day except Sunday.

== Location ==
The station was built among existing slate workings which had been rail-served for some years. The original route to the station and nearby workings was to be buried under slate waste from around 1900, but the railway still needed to access quarries near the former station, so a replacement branch was built from Glan-y-Pwll, allowing the original line to be buried.

The station building was joined to Dinas engine shed which long outlived the station, finally closing in 1900, when it was replaced by a new building at Glan-y-Pwll. The original shed housed the railway's "Top Shunter", a locomotive long given to providing unofficial services to lineside dwellings.

== Closure ==
In 1866 the FR opened Dinas Junction, from which its new "Branch Line" (the original line to Dinas being the "Main Line") ran to the new Duffws (FR) station nearer to the centre of the town. Trains from Portmadoc alternated between the two stations, but Duffws was better sited for passenger traffic, so Dinas closed in 1870. Slate traffic to the Dinas station area nevertheless continued well into the 20th Century.

== Modern times ==
The station was eventually covered by slate waste, under which it is now completely buried.

Preceding station	Heritage railways	Following station
Disused railways
Tanygrisiau towards Porthmadog Harbour	Ffestiniog Railway 1865–1870	Terminus
