= Blaenau Ffestiniog (Pantyrafon) railway station =

Disused railway station in Gwynedd, Wales

Blaenau Ffestiniog (Pantyrafon)

General information
- Location: Blaenau Ffestiniog, Gwynedd; Wales
- Coordinates: 53.0036°N 3.9433°W
- Grid reference: SH 696 469
- Platforms: 1

Other information
- Status: Disused

History
- Original company: London and North Western Railway

Key dates
- 22 July 1879: Opened
- 1 April 1881: Replaced by permanent station
Location

Blaenau Ffestiniog (Pantyrafon) was the London and North Western Railway's (LNWR) first passenger station in Blaenau Ffestiniog, then in Merionethshire, now in Gwynedd, Wales. It opened on 22 July 1879 as a temporary structure for use until the company's permanent station opened on 1 April 1881, when the temporary structure closed. It was situated within yards of the southern portal of Ffestiniog Tunnel.

== Context ==
The evolution of Blaenau's passenger stations was complex with five different railway companies providing services to the area.

== The station's name ==
Different sources refer to the station as "Blaenau Festiniog", "Pantyrafon", "Blaenau Festiniog (1)", or give descriptions, such as "a temporary station at the 'town' end of the tunnel", "the first temporary station", or "a temporary terminus near the foot of the Llechwedd incline".

Whatever it was called, the station served workers living in the Conwy Valley and working in the quarries north west of Blaenau, but was half a mile from the town itself.

== The station today ==
No trace of the station survives.

Preceding station	Disused railways	Following station
Terminus	London and North Western Railway	Roman Bridge

== Gallery ==
- "Tunnel mouth, Blaenau Ffestiniog North & Stesion Fain". Britain from Above.
- "Tunnel mouth, Blaenau Ffestiniog North & Stesion Fain". Britain from Above.
- "Blaenau Ffestiniog North & Stesion Fain". Britain from Above.

== Other material ==
- Boyd, James I.C. (1988) [1972]. Narrow Gauge Railways in South Caernarvonshire – Volume 1. Headington: The Oakwood Press. ISBN 978-0-85361-365-7. OCLC 20417464.
