= Blaenau Ffestiniog North railway station =

Disused railway station in Gwynedd, Wales

Blaenau Ffestiniog North
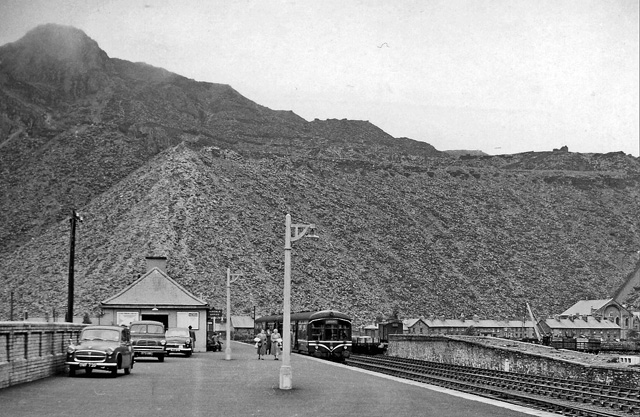
- Blaenau Ffestiniog North in the late 1950s

General information
- Location: Blaenau Ffestiniog, Gwynedd; Wales
- Coordinates: 52.9957°N 3.9443°W
- Grid reference: SH 696 460
- Platforms: 1

Other information
- Status: Disused

History
- Original company: London and North Western Railway
- Post-grouping: LMSR

Key dates
- 1 April 1881: Opened as "Blaenau Festiniog", replacing Blaenau Ffestiniog (Pantyrafon)
- 18 June 1951: Renamed "Blaenau Ffestiniog North"
- 8 May 1968: Renamed "Blaenau Ffestiniog"
- 22 March 1982: Replaced by a new Blaenau Ffestiniog nearer town centre
Location

Blaenau Ffestiniog North (initially named plain "Blaenau Festiniog", without a second f) was the London and North Western Railway's (LNWR's) second passenger station in Blaenau Ffestiniog, then in Merionethshire, now in Gwynedd, Wales.

== Context ==
The evolution of Blaenau's passenger stations was complex with five different railway companies providing services to the area.

== Line extensions ==
The station opened on 1 April 1881, extending the line by 50 chains (1,000 m) from its temporary terminus next to the mouth of Ffestiniog Tunnel. The temporary terminus thereby became redundant and closed, it had served since the line south of Betws-y-Coed opened in 1879.

Blaenau Ffestiniog North was the southern passenger terminus of what has become known as the Conwy Valley Line from Llandudno. It remained so for 100 years until it was replaced by the modern Blaenau Ffestiniog on 22 March 1982. The line to the new station extended the Conwy Valley Line by 21 chains (420 m) east of the site of Blaenau Ffestiniog North. In May 1982 the narrow gauge Ffestiniog Railway completed its return to Blaenau by opening its part of the new station. Both standard and narrow gauge parts remain open today.

== The station and wharves ==
Blaenau Ffestiniog North only ever had one platform, situated to the south of the tracks. The station site was, however, extensive, because it provided for conventional goods traffic and a wharf for interchange traffic with the Ffestiniog Railway, notably for slate working, but for other goods besides, particularly incoming coal. The site was bordered on one side by a huge slate waste tip, as shown above right, and on a second side by a near-vertical cliff face.

Three sets of tracks entered the triangular wharf and yard:

- Standard gauge from the north west
- Narrow gauge from Oakeley Quarries, also from the north west, and
- Narrow gauge from Maenofferen and Votty & Bowydd quarries from the southeast, having passed through Duffws (FR)

There were two goods sheds, one with an awning over a lone standard gauge track and an adjacent, much larger, enclosed building with a standard gauge track and a narrow gauge track running through portals at each end. This structure contained three cranes and defined the railway skyline from the passenger platform.

The scene at ground level was dominated by the exchange sidings of standard and narrow gauges, with waist high narrow gauge tracks for manual transfer of slates leading to high level transfer sidings nearest the passenger platform. These were raised higher than a man at their northern ends The visual impact was topped by slates stacked in vast numbers in alternating directions giving a striking chequerboard effect. The GWR, the LNWR (and the Padarn Railway) built fleets of transporter wagons with narrow gauge tracks set on top. Loaded narrow-gauge wagons were rolled onto the tracks on the larger wagons, locked into place then carried pick-a-back to a narrow-gauge railhead in the GWR's case, to Port Dinorwic by the Padarn and by the LNWR to Deganwy- which the company expensively and unprofitably expanded for slate traffic. The GWR and Padarn tracks were set longitudinally on the host wagons, so narrow gauge wagons were end-loaded. The lines on the LNWR's transporter wagons were set at a right angle to their direction of travel, so the narrow gauge wagons were pushed on and off from the side, three per host wagon.

The layout was all the more striking because it was multi-level, with narrow gauge lines at ground level, at an intermediate level for transferring slates by hand horizontally from narrow gauge wagon to standard gauge wagon and at higher level for pushing wagons off and onto hosts. Conversely, there was a standard gauge siding at a higher level to enable coal and other goods to have gravity on their side as they were transferred to narrow gauge tubs or road vehicles for distribution.

The site included a hand-operated turntable and a combined standard gauge engine and carriage shed, opened in 1881. The locomotive part was closed on 14 September 1931 and given over to carriage storage, the building was subsequently demolished. The whole site was overseen by a large and very tall signalbox which had been replaced by a much more modest affair by 1949.

The single passenger platform ended with cattle pens and a "Landing" for driving animals off and onto cattle trucks from the end. Stables were provided near the site's road entrance.

== Station buildings ==
The original wooden station building was large, in proportion with the LNWR's hopes for profit from their very costly investment, not least in cutting Ffestiniog Tunnel for over two miles through sold rock. The company also built the North Western Hotel nearby with similar aspirations; it was sold off in 1906. The station building burnt down in 1951, being replaced with temporary buildings until a permanent structure was completed in 1956. This building was much smaller than the timber version, but still generous with goods and parcels traffic in steep decline.

== The station as an interchange ==
The LNWR sought to tap custom not only from Blaenau Ffestiniog itself, but also its hinterland. From the outset it co-operated with the Ffestiniog Railway (FR) who built their Blaenau Festiniog Junction station (known locally as "Stesion Fain") on the opposite side of North Western Road. Timetabling was sympathetic; in 1910, for example, three of the FR's four non-workmen's trains from Porthmadog Harbour arrived between 27 and 42 minutes before an LNWR train headed north, giving a traveller from (say) Minffordd a good chance of getting to Dolwyddelan even if his first train was 15 minutes late. The LNW station boasted a very large station nameboard proclaiming "BLAENAU FESTINIOG CHANGE HERE FOR NARROW GAUGE LINE TO MINFFORD AND PORTMADOC". Stesion Fain ("Narrow station") closed in 1939, but the mantle of interchange traffic was picked up by buses which began operating from the area of the erstwhile cattle dock.

== Stations' names ==
In 1951 the two surviving stations in Blaenau were renamed. The ex-GWR station became Blaenau Ffestiniog Central and the ex-LNWR station became Blaenau Ffestiniog North. The nameboard which replaced the one quoted above was changed to the new corporate style, bearing the words "BLAENAU FFESTINIOG STATION". This became accurate on 6 May 1968 when, eight years after Blaenau Ffestiniog Central closed, Blaenau Ffestiniog North took on its third name, becoming plain "Blaenau Ffestiniog". Research continues into which other UK stations' nameboards have included the word "Station". As statuary next to the modern Blaenau Ffestiniog station records, the station was sometimes referred to locally as "Stesion London".

== Services ==
The regular service to Llandudno Junction went over to DMUs in March 1956, though goods, specials and charter trains remained steam-hauled for some years. General freight ended on 4 May 1964, but wagonload traffic continued until 1982.

== External influences ==
Two external events threw the station a lifeline in the 1950s. In 1957 Liverpool Corporation was granted powers to dam the Afon Tryweryn, thereby creating Llyn Celyn and flooding part of the Bala to Blaenau Line, That line closed to passengers in January 1960 and closed altogether in January 1961, taking Trawsfynydd off the railway map. The immediate impact on Blaenau Ffestiniog North station was minimal, but around the same time the decision was made to build Trawsfynydd nuclear power station. This would require a rail connection to transport nuclear materials. With the line through Trawsfynydd closed the southern end of the Conwy Valley Line would be connected to the northern end of the closed Bala line at the site of Blaenau Ffestiniog Central. In effect this subsidised the Conwy Valley Line. The connection was opened in 1964, its physical effect on Blaenau Ffestiniog North was to shave a corner off the eastern end of the platform so the new cross-town chord could continue along the erstwhile FR trackbed.

== The Ffestiniog Railway returns ==
The preserved Ffestiniog Railway progressed back towards Blaenau throughout the 1970s, raising the question of where its new Blaenau terminus would be. The half-buried Stesion Fain site was closely considered, which would have made Blaenau Ffestiniog North's future secure by reviving its long-ceased role as an interchange station with the narrow gauge. As a marker and statement of intent the FR installed their locomotive "Princess" on the Stesion Fain site. In the event British Railways (BR) and the FR agreed that a wholly new interchange in the middle of Blaenau would be best. There would be no case for both the new station and the ex-LNWR station to co-exist a quarter of a mile apart, so when the BR part of the new station opened on 22 March 1982, the erstwhile Blaenau Ffestiniog North closed the same day. The FR part of the new station opened on 25 May 1982. Just as there was no case for two standard gauge stations there was no case for two narrow gauge stations. the track through Stesion Fein was reinstated, but no station, a commemorative flower bed marks its location.

== Special trains ==
Until 1982 loco-hauled specials had to perform convoluted shunting movements in the rationalised station to get the loco to the right end of the train for the journey back to the coast, otherwise freight, occasional passenger specials and trackwork trains to Trawsfynydd continued to pass the station site until 1998 when all nuclear material had been removed from the power station. The line south of the new BR/FR station was then mothballed, which remains the case today. Passing trains comprises standard gauge DMUs along the platform edge and narrow gauge behind, with occasional special trains on the standard gauge. The railways of Blaenau are freight-free.

== The site today ==
After the station closed in 1982 it was boarded up and left to decay for some years, eventually being demolished. The wharf area was progressively de-tracked from the early 1960s, then parts and finally all but the railway corridor to the new station were fenced off and built on. This remained the situation in 2016.

Preceding station	Disused railways	Following station
Terminus	London Midland Region of British Rail; Conwy Valley Line	Roman Bridge

== Other material ==
- Boyd, James I.C. (1988) [1972]. Narrow Gauge Railways in South Caernarvonshire – Volume 1. Headington: The Oakwood Press. ISBN 978-0-85361-365-7. OCLC 20417464.
