= Bala and Festiniog Railway =

Welsh transport company

- Industry: Railway company
- Predecessor: Festiniog and Blaenau Railway
- Founded: July 28, 1873 (company formed); November 1, 1882 (railway opened)
- Defunct: 1960 (passengers); 1961 (freight)
- Headquarters: North Wales

The Bala and Festiniog Railway was a 4 ft 8 1/2 in (1,435 mm), standard gauge, railway backed by the Great Western Railway (GWR) in north-west Wales. It connected Bala with Blaenau Ffestiniog.

== History ==
Bala and Festiniog Railway Act 1873
- Act of Parliament
- Parliament of the United Kingdom
- Long title: An Act to authorise the construction of a Railway from Bala to Festiniog in the county of Merioneth; and for other purposes.
- Citation: 36 & 37 Vict. c. ccvii

Dates
- Royal assent: 28 July 1873

Text of statute as originally enacted

Bala and Festiniog Railway Act 1878
- Act of Parliament
- Parliament of the United Kingdom
- Long title: An Act to authorise an extension of time for the completion of the Bala and Festiniog Railway.
- Citation: 41 & 42 Vict. c. xv

Dates
- Royal assent: 16 April 1878

Text of statute as originally enacted

The railway originally connected Bala with Llan Ffestiniog. It was incorporated by the Bala and Festiniog Railway Act 1873 (36 & 37 Vict. c. ccvii) on 28 July 1873 and opened on 1 November 1882. In 1883 the line was extended by converting the existing Festiniog and Blaenau Railway between Llan Ffestiniog and Blaenau Ffestiniog from 1 ft 11 1/2 in (597 mm) gauge to 4 ft 8 1/2 in (1,435 mm) standard gauge. The line terminated at Blaenau Ffestiniog (GWR) where until 1939 it connected with the Ffestiniog Railway to Porthmadog. At Bala Junction, the line connected with the Ruabon to Barmouth GWR line.

The Bala and Festiniog was vested in the Great Western Railway on 1 July 1910 by the Great Western Railway (General Powers) Act 1910 (10 Edw. 7 & 1 Geo. 5. c. xxii). On nationalisation in 1948 management of the line passed to the Western Region of British Railways.

The line closed to passengers in 1960 and to freight in 1961. An unusual feature of freight operation on the line was the carriage of 1 ft 11 1/2 in (597 mm) gauge slate wagons (provided by the GWR) on standard gauge transporter wagons between Tan-y-Manod and Blaenau Ffestiniog where the wagons were off-loaded in the large station yard and their loads of dressed slate transferred to standard gauge GWR wagons for carriage back the way they had come then on via Manod and Bala.

The building of the Llyn Celyn reservoir necessitated the flooding of the line. A diversion was considered but never built. A short section from Bala Junction to Bala remained open but was eventually closed in 1965.

The summit of the line was at Cwm Prysor which lay at 1,278 feet or 390 metres above sea level. The line served an extremely remote area of North Wales, most of which was not served by a main road until the A4212 road opened in the early 1960s.

In 1964, a connection was made through Blaenau to the Conwy Valley Line at Blaenau Ffestiniog North allowing access as far as Trawsfynydd nuclear power station; a loading facility for nuclear flasks was constructed on a siding a hundred yards north of the closed Trawsfynydd Lake Halt.

In 1982, the Ffestiniog Railway was reopened to a wholly new Blaenau Ffestiniog on the site of the former GWR station. Conwy Valley line services were extended along the 1964 connection to the new interchange station and Blaenau Ffestiniog North (LNWR) was closed.

On 17 July 1989, the first passenger train beyond Blaenau Ffestiniog ran to a temporary platform at Trawsfynydd (Maentwrog Road). Organised by Provincial, regular Sunday services ran from Sunday 23 July to Sunday 10 September in the form of an extension of the 09.45 Llandudno train, with a return at 13.40. A maximum of 60 passengers could be carried as far as Trawsfynydd where they were met by a bus to the nuclear power station for a guided tour.

== Current status ==
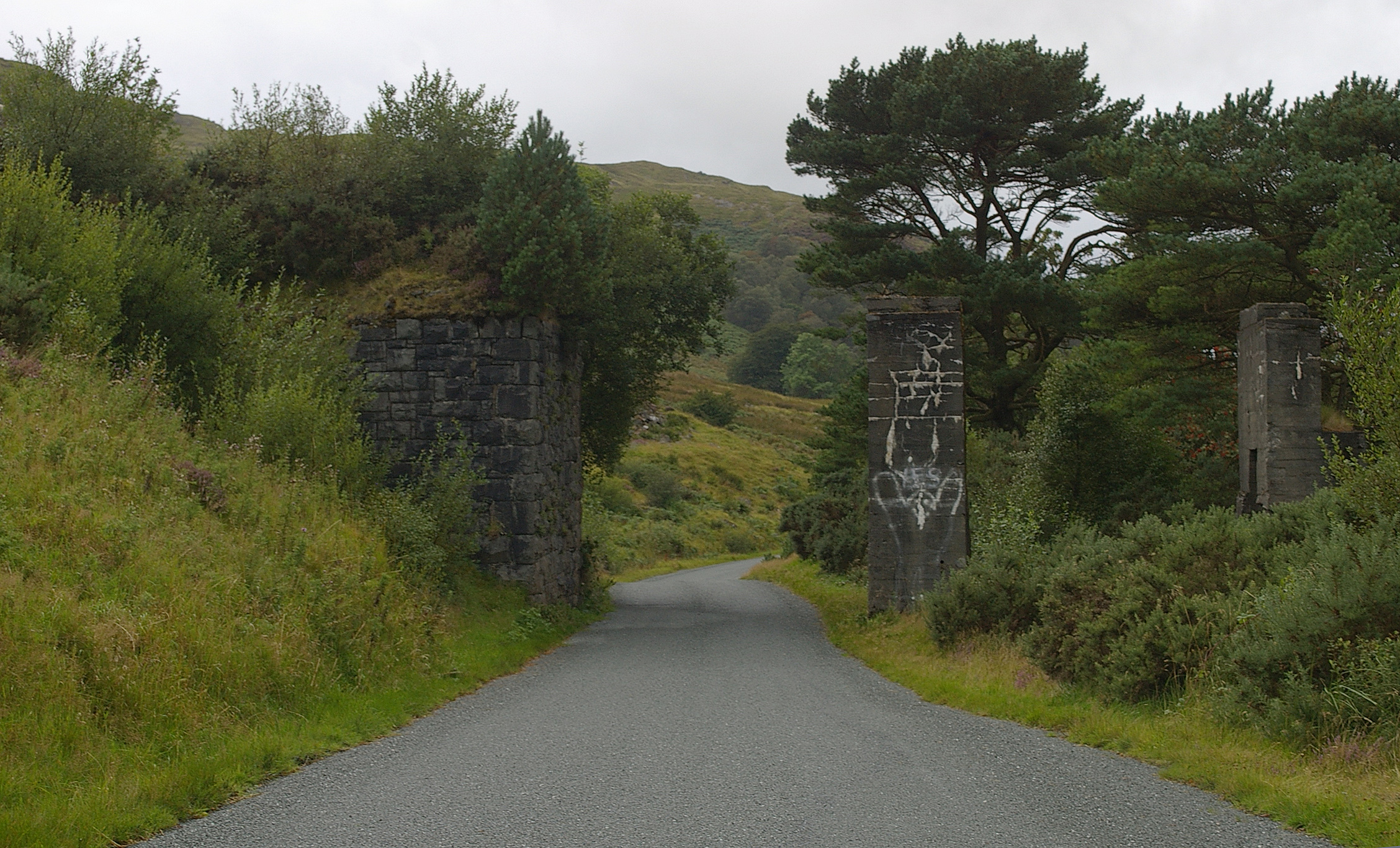
The remains of a tramway linking to the BFR near Llyn Celyn

The only part of the line in use today is the very short section between the two stations in Blaenau Ffestiniog. The section of line between Blaenau (GWR) and Trawsfynydd power station closed in 1998, although the track is protected and has remained in situ since. Much of the trackbed south of Trawsfynydd remains intact except for the section flooded by Llyn Celyn and some sections used to improve the A4212 road. Several other sections are open as permissive paths.

Many of the former stations are now in use as private residences.

== Heritage railway plans ==
=== Trawsfynydd Railway Company ===
During 2016, the Trawsfynydd Railway Company was formed under the ownership of Colin Dale and with the use of volunteer labour, began to clear the line to Trawsfynydd Lake railway station which they proposed to be their terminus. They also intended to re-open Maentwrog Road, Llan Ffestiniog, a halt at Cwm Teigl and at Manod, en route.

The clearing of the line was sanctioned by the owner of the trackbed, Network Rail and by 10 October 2016, more than six productive days had been achieved. Also, a bid was unsuccessfully made for DB Cargo's Class 08 locomotive No. 08757 from Crewe which would cost £19,600. A crowd funding site was launched to this end.

In August 2017 Network Rail took the decision to revoke the licence issued to Trawsfynydd Railway Company for clearing the line following an investigation which found several breaches of the terms and conditions of the licence agreement.

The company dissolved in December 2018 following the death of the owner.

=== Blaenau Ffestiniog and Trawsfynydd Railway Society ===
A separate volunteer society, the Blaenau Ffestiniog and Trawsfynydd Railway Society, kept a watching brief in the background to the Trawsfynydd Railway Company. After it lost its licence to clear the line, the Blaenau Ffestiniog and Trawsfynydd Railway Society stepped in with the goal of developing its own plans to restore the line in a manner acceptable to Network Rail and other stakeholders.

A new interim committee was formed through co-opting existing committee members from the Trawsfynydd Railway Company. It held its first and only AGM on 3 February 2019 to discuss how to take the next steps towards restoring the line. Plans included changing the Society into the Bala and Ffestiniog Railway Heritage Trust.

==== Bala and Festiniog Railway Heritage Trust ====
The outcome of the AGM was to disband the existing Blaenau Ffestiniog and Trawsfynydd Railway Society and replace it with a limited company named the Bala and Festiniog Railway Heritage Trust. It would be run by an elected committee which had the mandate to preserve the history of the old line between Bala and Ffestiniog and to explore options of how to restore the line between Trawsfynydd and Ffestiniog to operational use. Members of the committee reiterated that this would involve much paperwork before any tangible progress was made on the physical infrastructure once an agreement is obtained from Network Rail. The company was shut down in 2023 due to lack of support.

== See also ==
- Map of places on 'Bala and Festiniog Railway' compiled from this article
