= Festiniog railway station =

Disused railway station in Gwynedd, Wales

Festiniog
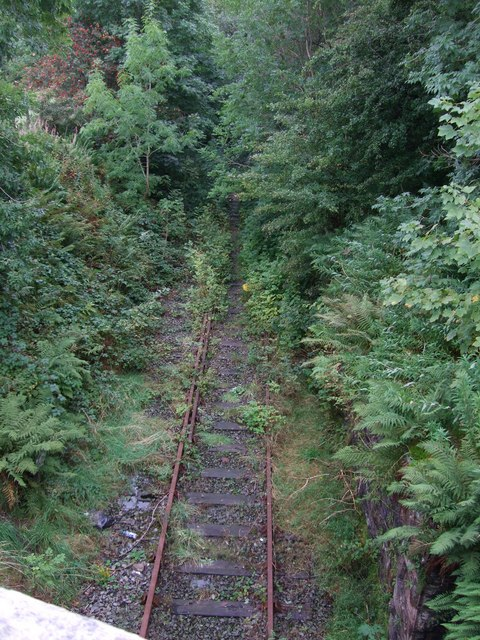
- The disused tracks near the site of the station in 2009

General information
- Location: Llan Ffestiniog, Gwynedd; Wales
- Coordinates: 52.9591°N 3.9304°W
- Grid reference: SH 704 419
- Platforms: 2

Other information
- Status: Disused

History
- Original company: F&BR (Narrow Gauge), B&FR (Standard Gauge)
- Pre-grouping: Great Western Railway

Key dates
- 30 May 1868: Narrow gauge opened to Blaenau
- 1 November 1882: Standard gauge opened from Bala
- 10 September 1883: Standard gauge replaced narrow
- 4 January 1960: Closed to passengers
- 28 January 1961: Line and station closed
- 10 April 1964: Line reopened, but not the station
- 17 October 1998: Line closed and mothballed
Location

Festiniog railway station served the village of Llan Ffestiniog, Gwynedd, Wales. This station was one of many 19th century institutions in Wales to be given an anglicised name. Over the years, and especially since the Second World War, most have been rendered into Welsh or given both Welsh and English names, but Festiniog station closed before this happened. The village of Llan Ffestiniog – known locally simply as "Llan" – lies over 3 km south of the larger and more recent Blaenau Ffestiniog, and over three miles south by rail.

== Origins ==
The station opened in May 1868 as the southern terminus of the 1 ft 11 3/4 in (603 mm) narrow gauge Festiniog and Blaenau Railway (F&BR).

The narrow gauge line's primary traffic was passengers, and workmen in particular, with goods traffic small by comparison. Receipts in 1879, for example, included £1409 from passengers against £416 for goods. Slate was brought to the station by packhorse and sled from Drum quarry. One source states that some slate was brought here from Tan-y-Manod in narrow gauge days.

In common with all other F&BR stations there were no platforms; carriages were very low to the ground, so passengers boarded from and alighted to the trackside. The F&BR station building contained a station office, store and passenger shelter. In common with Tyddyngwyn and Tan-y-Manod stations, the only published photographs were taken from a distance, they lend the buildings the appearance of corrugated iron. The sole close-up station photo is of the line's northern terminus – Duffws (F&BR). This shows the building to bear a striking resemblance to weatherboarding. If the line's other stations were made of the same material, that would explain their corrugated appearance.

An apparently rudimentary shelter stood on the opposite side of the track; it served as a carriage and loco shed and repair shop. This latter structure became a slate shed after narrow gauge services ceased. A photo of a narrow gauge train at the station is reproduced in two significant works on the route without being captioned as being at that location in either. That the photo shows a train at Llan Ffestiniog is demonstrated by a much later shot in a third serious work, and corroborated by local readers. One further published photograph is captioned as "...could be at Llan Ffestiniog."

== The standard gauge arrives ==
In 1882 the standard gauge Bala and Festiniog Railway reached Llan Ffestiniog from the south. The standard gauge station was just to the south-east of and some thirty feet above the narrow gauge terminus, close enough to form one station concourse. People travelling from (say) Bala to Blaenau walked the few yards from the standard gauge train to the narrow gauge train, much as they do today between the Conwy Valley Line and the Ffestiniog Railway at Blaenau Ffestiniog.

The following year the narrow gauge line was converted to standard gauge, but narrow gauge trains continued to run until 5 September 1883 using a third rail. Standard gauge trains first ran through from Bala to Blaenau Ffestiniog on 10 September 1883.

The standard gauge station's facilities were more extensive than what had gone before. They included a loading shed for slate brought by road from Drum and other local quarries.

The standard gauge station building, especially its double gable canopy without stanchions and yellow brick signalbox with slate weatherboarding down one side, were unlike any other structures on the branch. In the 20th century a GWR pagoda-style building was erected, set at a right angle directly off the down platform north of the main station building. Its use has yet to be established, but it was still there in 1989, long after all other buildings had been demolished.

The route was single track throughout. The stations at Bala, Arenig, Trawsfynydd and Festiniog had two platforms, each with its own track. This both allowed for potential traffic and provided passing loops. A fifth loop was provided between 1908 and 1950 immediately north of Cwm Prysor, when intermittent heavy military traffic to and from Trawsfynydd Camp was likely.

== Services ==
The February 1878 narrow gauge timetable shows that all trains called at all stations on the line, with

- Northbound ("Up")
  - four public trains running Monday to Saturday
  - an unadvertised morning workmen's train running Monday to Saturday
  - two public evening trains on Saturdays only
    - The journey time from Festiniog to Diphwys(F&BR) was 20 minutes.
- Southbound ("Down")
  - four public trains running Monday to Saturday
  - a morning workmen's train running Monday to Saturday
  - two public evening trains on Saturdays only
  - a teatime workmen's train on Saturdays only
    - The journey time from Diphwys (F&BR) to Festiniog was 20 minutes.
- There was no Sunday service.

Diphwys (F&BR) was the company's Blaenau station, and later became the site of the town's later GWR station, but it was not the Festiniog Railway's Duffws (FR) station. Through passengers from Festiniog to Porthmadog Harbour would alight at the F&BR's Diphwys station and walk across Church Street in Blaenau to the Festiniog Railway's completely separate Duffws station. Most trains were timetabled to make this transfer possible, if tight. Whether connecting trains were held in the case of late running is not recorded.

The September 1959 timetable shows

- Northbound
  - three trains calling at all stations from Bala to Blaenau on Monday to Saturday
  - an extra evening train calling at all stations from Bala to Blaenau on Saturday
  - a Monday to Friday train calling at all stations from Bala to Trawsfynydd
    - The journey time from Bala to Festiniog was around 65 minutes.
- Southbound
  - three trains calling at all stations from Blaenau to Bala on Monday to Saturday
  - two extra trains calling at all stations from Blaenau to Bala on Saturday
  - an extra train calling at all stations from Blaenau to Trawsfynydd on Saturday evening
  - a Monday to Friday train calling at all stations from Blaenau to Bala, except Llafar, Bryn-celynog and Cwm Prysor Halts
    - The journey time from Blaenau to Festiniog was around 15 minutes.
- There was no Sunday service.

After the Second World War most trains were composed of two carriages, with one regular out and back run comprising just one brake third coach of which a quarter was given over to space for the guard, his equipment and space for goods and parcels. At least one train along the line regularly ran as a mixed train, with a second between Bala and Arenig. By that time such trains had become rare on Britain's railways. Workmen's trains had been a feature of the line from the outset; they were the Festiniog and Blaenau Railway's biggest source of revenue. Such a service between Trawsfynydd and Blaenau Ffestiniog survived until the line's closure to passengers in 1960. Until 1930 at the earliest, such services used dedicated, lower standard, coaches which used a specific siding at Blaenau where the men boarded from and alighted to the ballast.

The station handled some tourist traffic, notably to visit Cynfal Falls a mile away.

The line from Bala north to Trawsfynydd was designated in the restrictive "Blue" weight limit, with the section from Trawsfynydd to Blaenau limited even more tightly to "Yellow". The literature conjectures on overweight classes being used on troop trains, but no solid claim or photograph has been published. Only three steam age photos of the line show anything other than an 0-4-2 or 0-6-0 tank engine, two being of GWR 2251 Class 0-6-0s taken in the 1940s. with a third being on a Dean 0-6-0 on a troop train in GWR days. As the 1950s passed "5700" and "7400" 0-6-PTs stole the show, exemplified by 9610 at Festiniog in the 1950s. 0-4-2T engines "..suffer[ed] from limited tank capacity and power."

== Second World War ==
During the war many works of art from galleries in London were stored in slate caverns at Manod, two miles northeast of Llan Ffestiniog. Although there was a station there its goods facilities were limited and the most direct road to the quarry led from Llan Ffestiniog, so the treasures were brought by the GWR to Festiniog station where they were put onto lorries for the last leg to Manod. Some of the paintings were so large that the roadway under the bridge north of the station had to be lowered.

== Closure and reopening ==
By the 1950s the line was deemed unremunerative. A survey undertaken in 1956 and 1957 found that the average daily numbers of passengers boarding and alighting were:

- Blaenau Ffestiniog Central 62 and 65
- Manod Halt 7 and 4
- Teigl Halt 5 and 5
- Festiniog 28 and 26
- Maentwrog Road 8 and 6
- Trawsfynydd Lake Halt 1 and 1
- Trawsfynydd 28 and 24
- Llafar Halt 2 and 2
- Bryn-celynog Halt 2 and 2
- Cwm Prysor Halt 3 and 3
- Arenig 5 and 5
- Capel Celyn Halt 7 and 8
- Tyddyn Bridge Halt 4 and 6
- Frongoch 18 and 15
- Bala 65 and 58

Military traffic had ended and, apart from a finite contract to bring cement to Blaenau in connection with the construction of Ffestiniog Power Station, freight traffic was not heavy; most arriving and leaving Bala did so from and to the south and that to Blaenau could be handled from the Conwy Valley Line northwards.

In 1957 Parliament authorised Liverpool Corporation to flood a section of the line by damming the Afon Tryweryn. Monies were made available to divert the route round the dam, but it was decided that improving the road from Bala to Llan Ffestiniog would be of greater benefit. Road transport alternatives were established for groups such as schoolchildren and workers. The plans afoot for rail serving Trawsfynydd nuclear power station were to be catered for by building the long-discussed cross-town link between the two Blaenau standard gauge stations. The estimated financial savings to be made were £23,300 by withdrawing the passenger service and £7000 in renewal charges.

The station closed to passengers in January 1960 and to freight a year later, though the goods shed and booking office remained open for road-hauled traffic for some time further. The goods shed at Festiniog had latterly been used as a store for animal feed. In common with many country stations, coal had always been the principal inbound freight. Latterly, locals were contracted on an ad hoc day rate basis to unload such wagons using shovels. In 1964 the line reopened from Blaenau southwards through the station site to a siding near the site of Trawsfynydd Lake Halt where a large ("Goliath") gantry was erected to load and unload traffic for the then new Trawsfynydd nuclear power station. The main goods transported were nuclear fuel rods carried in nuclear flasks. The line was also used during the late 1980s for freight traffic to a siding at Maentwrog Road serving the explosives factory in Penrhyndeudraeth.

Passenger trains briefly returned to the line in 1989, passing through to a temporary platform at Maentwrog Road. These trains ran for one summer in an attempt to encourage tourism at the power station. Few people used the service to visit the power station (most riders travelled "for the ride") so the following year tourist trains drove to the line's terminus then reversed, with no-one getting on or off. This service lasted until the end of the 1990 Summer season. This reopening to passengers enabled rail tours to run from other parts of the country, which they did from time to time until closure in 1998.

Two notable specials were the two "last trains". The first ran from Bala to Blaenau Ffestiniog and return on 22 January 1961 and in the post-1964 era the "Trawsfynydd Lament" ran southwards to the limit of line at the power station loading point on 17 October 1998, the line having become redundant following removal of nuclear material from the power station.

== Morris Evans Oil ==
A distinctive feature for people arriving at the station was the smell of "Morris Evans Oil" which was made in a shed next door. As someone who travelled to the station once or twice a year put it: "It was a type of liniment, it stunk to high heaven but it was a legendary cure all in North Wales. It was supposed to have a secret ingredient." For a village this size Morris's stood large; it also served as a source of traffic for the railway.

== The future ==
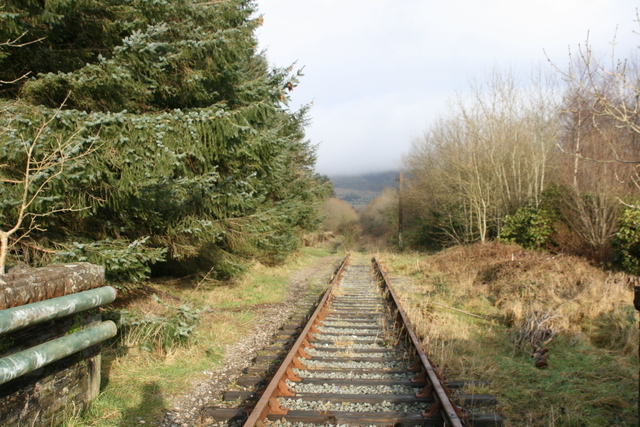
The mothballed line through the station site

Between 2000 and 2011 there were at least two attempts to put the remaining line to use, although by 2011 the whole station site had been completely demolished. In 2011 there were proposals to use the rails as a recreational velorail track. Neither this nor the earlier idea came to anything. The possibility remains that the surviving line could see future preservation or reuse by the nuclear industry. In Spring 2016 the mothballed line still ran through the site to the former nuclear flask loading point.

To considerable local surprise, fresh moves to reopen the line from Blaenau as far south as Trawsfynydd began in September 2016, with the formation of The Trawsfynydd & Blaenau Ffestiniog Community Railway Company. On 21 September at least one regional newspaper reported that "Volunteers are set to start work this weekend on clearing vegetation from the trackbed between Blaenau Ffestiniog and Trawsfynydd." The company was quoted as saying "We have been given a licence by Network Rail to clear and survey the line." By mid-October 2016 the company had achieved six working days of track clearance.

Preceding station	Disused railways	Following station
Tyddyngwyn; Line and station closed	Festiniog and Blaenau Railway	Terminus
Teigl Halt; Line mothballed, station closed	Great Western Railway; Bala and Ffestiniog Railway	Maentwrog Road; Line mothballed, station closed

== Further material ==
- Baughan, Peter E. (1991). A Regional History of the Railways of Great Britain: North and Mid Wales. Regional railway history series (2nd ed.). Nairn: David St John Thomas Publisher. ISBN 978-0-946537-59-4. OL 11571058M. Vol 11.
- Cowlishaw, Brian (2001) [1961]. North Wales Branches (DVD). Ultimate Archive Steam. Uffington, Shropshire: B&R Video Productions. Vol 38.
- Ferris, Tom (2004) [1961]. British Railways Volume 4 - Bewdley To Blaenau (DVD). demanddvd. DEMDVD084.
- "Western Branch Obituary". Talking of Trains. Trains Illustrated. Vol. 13, no. 142. Hampton Court: Ian Allan. July 1960. pp. 394–5.
