= Tan-y-Manod railway station =

Former railway station in Wales

Tan-y-Manod
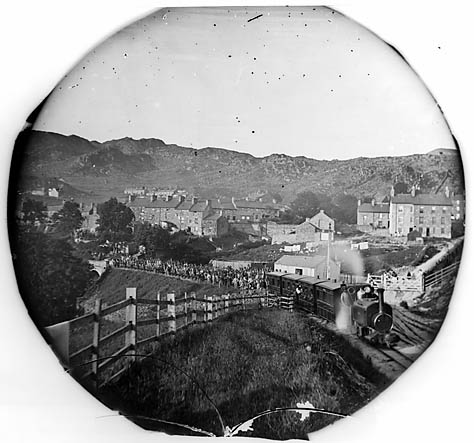
- The station around 1875

General information
- Location: Blaenau Ffestiniog, Gwynedd; Wales
- Coordinates: 52.9893°N 3.9292°W
- Grid reference: SH 705 452
- Platforms: 0

Other information
- Status: Disused

History
- Original company: Festiniog and Blaenau Railway
- Pre-grouping: Great Western Railway

Key dates
- 30 May 1868: Opened
- 5 September 1883: Station closed to passengers
- 10 September 1883: Standard gauge service and engine shed opened
- 1906: Engine shed closed
Location

Tan-y-Manod railway station was a railway station approximately 1 mile (1.6 km) south of Blaenau Ffestiniog, in Gwynedd (formerly Merionethshire), North Wales.

== History ==
=== Narrow gauge days ===
The station was on the 1 ft 11 3/4 in (603 mm) narrow gauge Festiniog and Blaenau Railway (F&BR); it opened with the line on 30 May 1868. The F&BR ran the three and a half route miles from its southern terminus at Llan Ffestiniog to a junction with the Ffestiniog Railway (FR) at Dolgarregddu Junction near what is nowadays Blaenau Ffestiniog station.

The station site served three purposes:

- a passenger station, whose main but not sole traffic was quarrymen travelling to and from work
- a passing loop, and
- a place where inclines from slate quarries met the F&BR

In common with all other F&BR stations there were no platforms, carriages were very low to the ground, so passengers boarded from and alighted to the trackside. The station had a single-storey building on the eastern, outer, side of the sharply curving track. No details of its facilities have been published. In common with Festiniog and Tyddyngwyn stations, the only published photographs were taken from a distance, lending the buildings the appearance of corrugated iron. The sole close-up photo is of the line's northern terminus - Duffws (F&BR). This shows the building to bear a striking resemblance to 21st Century PVC weatherboarding. If the line's other stations were made of the same material that would explain their corrugated mien.

In F&BR days the gauges of the quarries, the F&BR and the Ffestiniog Railway were sufficiently close to allow trucks to pass between the three, with the F&BR being near enough to FR standards to enable FR locos and wagons to use F&BR metals to reach Tan-y-Manod if needed, which they were until F&BR locos arrived some time after the line opened, and occasionally thereafter. Loaded wagons would descend the inclines from Manod and Craig Ddu slate quarries to Tany-y-Manod then be hauled northwards to the FR, who forwarded them to customers or to ships at Porthmadog Harbour.

==== Services ====
The February 1878 narrow gauge timetable shows that all trains called at all stations on the line, with

- Northbound ("Up")
  - four public trains running Monday to Saturday
  - an unadvertised morning workmen's train running Monday to Saturday
  - two public evening trains on Saturdays only
    - The journey time from Tan-y-Manod to Diphwys(F&BR) was 7 minutes.
- Southbound ("Down")
  - four public trains running Monday to Saturday
  - a morning workmen's train running Monday to Saturday
  - two public evening trains on Saturdays only
  - a teatime workmen's train on Saturdays only
    - The journey time from Diphwys (F&BR) to Tan-y-Manod was 3 minutes.
- There was no Sunday service.

Duffws was the F&BR's Blaenau station and would become the site of the town's later GWR station, but it was not the Festiniog Railway's Duffws (FR) station. Through passengers from Tan-y-Manod to Porthmadog Harbour would alight at the F&BR's Diphwys station and walk across Church Street in Blaenau to the Festiniog Railway's completely separate Duffws station. Most trains were timetabled to make this process workable, if tight. Whether connecting trains were held in the case of late running is not recorded.

In the line's early days trains many trains ran "mixed", but this was stopped in 1877. Unlike most railways in the area, passengers were the line's mainstay. In 1879 - a typical year - passenger receipts were £1406 compared with £416 for goods. No figures have been published specifically for Tan-y-Manod.

=== The standard gauge approaches ===
On 1 September 1882 the standard gauge Bala and Festiniog Railway reached Llan Ffestiniog from the south, enabling a passenger from (say) Bala to Tan-y-Manod to transfer from a standard gauge train to a narrow gauge train by walking a few yards, much as modern-day passengers transfer between Conwy Valley Line and Ffestiniog Railway trains at Blaenau Ffestiniog.

From April the following year the narrow gauge line was converted to standard gauge. Narrow gauge trains continued to operate during the conversion, using a third rail and a diversion around the wooden viaduct north of Tan-y-Manod, which was demolished and replaced by a stone version. Narrow gauge trains ceased running on 5 September 1883 with standard gauge services beginning on 10 September 1883.

=== Standard gauge days ===
The site was quite restricted, being on a curved embankment bounded by hillsides. The Bala and Festiniog Railway, then later the Great Western developed Tan-y-Manod's facilities and priorities, they

- removed the passing loop
- demolished the passenger station building, and
- never provided passenger services

in their place they installed:

- a single "road" (track) engine shed with a water crane
- a 45 feet (14 m) turntable
- a siding, and
- two slate transshipment sidings.

Each transshipment siding (sometimes referred to as a transfer dock or a wharf or a loading bank) had either one or a pair of narrow gauge lines raised on a platform meeting a standard gauge line end-to-end. The standard gauge transporter wagons (sometimes called "host" wagons) were flat wagons with narrow gauge tracks set on top. The heights of the tracks meant that six slate wagons could be manhandled 'pick-a-back' onto each transporter wagon in pairs, side by side. They were made up to trains then hauled to Blaenau Ffestiniog where either the above process was reversed with the narrow gauge wagons being manually propelled onto the narrow gauge Ffestiniog Railway or they were unloaded, sorted and transshipped into GWR standard gauge wagons. When the latter happened they ended up travelling southwards past Tan-y-Manod on the way to their final destination. The layout of at least the most northerly of the raised sidings lent itself to unloading slates conventionally, side by side from narrow gauge wagons to standard gauge, but use in this way is not described in sources.

The GWR, like the LNWR and the FR, provided the quarry owners with free use of narrow gauge wagons in an attempt to promote the use of their own route. A batch of 50 were ordered from Swindon in 1899, a survivor was on public display at Llechwedd Slate Caverns in 1977. Slate traffic using the transporter wagons continued until Craig Ddu quarry closed in 1945, after which the transfer sidings lay disused.

The engine shed - a sub-shed of Croes Newydd - closed as long ago as 1906, but it was clearly in use for some purpose in 1936. The building was demolished between 1936 and 1959 except for the walls towards the rear which supported the water tank which served the water crane, with the buffer stops being moved forwards outside the site of the shed. Walls, tank, crane and turntable remained in use to the last train on 27 January 1961. It was custom and practice for all locomotives which arrived at Blaenau to be sent to Tan-y-Manod to be watered, serviced and turned. They then returned to Blaenau for their next train southwards, sometimes shunting coal wagons at Blaenau gas works on the way.

=== 1961 Railway Reopening ===
The line closed in 1961 but it was mothballed pending building the long-discussed cross-town link to enable trains to run along the Conwy Valley Line, through Blaenau and on to Trawsfynydd nuclear power station which was then being built. The line past the site of Tan-y-Manod station, the engine shed and transshipment sidings reopened on 24 April 1964, but none of Tan-y-Manod's facilities were brought back to life. The line closed again in 1998 as the nuclear plant was being decommissioned. Once more the route was mothballed in case a future use is found.

== The station site in the 21st Century ==
By 2011 the whole site had been completely demolished. In Spring 2016 the mothballed single track line still ran past the site to the former nuclear flask loading point.

== The future ==
Between 2000 and 2011 there were at least two attempts to put the remaining line to use. In 2011 there were proposals to use the rails as a recreational velorail track. Neither this nor the earlier idea came to anything. The possibility remains that the surviving line could see future preservation or reuse by the nuclear industry.

To considerable local surprise fresh moves to reopen the line from Blaenau as far south as Trawsfynydd began in September 2016, with the formation of The Trawsfynydd & Blaenau Ffestiniog Community Railway Company. On 21 September at least one regional newspaper reported that "Volunteers are set to start work this weekend on clearing vegetation from the trackbed between Blaenau Ffestiniog and Trawsfynydd." The company was quoted as saying "We have been given a licence by Network Rail to clear and survey the line."

Preceding station	Disused railways	Following station
Duffws (F&BR); 1868-April 1883 Station closed	Festiniog and Blaenau Railway; Narrow gauge	Tyddyngwyn; Line and station closed
Glynllifon Street; April–September 1883 Line closed	Festiniog and Blaenau Railway; Narrow gauge	Tyddyngwyn; Line and station closed

== Further material ==
- Baughan, Peter E. (1980). A Regional History of the Railways of Great Britain: Volume 11 North and Mid Wales (1st ed.). Newton Abbot: David & Charles. ISBN 978-0-7153-7850-2. OCLC 6823219.
- Christiansen, Rex (1976). Forgotten Railways: North and Mid Wales. Newton Abbot: David and Charles. ISBN 978-0-7153-7059-9.
- Coleford, I. C. (November 2010b). Smith, Martin (ed.). "By GWR to Blaenau Ffestiniog (Part Two)". Railway Bylines. 15 (12). Radstock: Irwell Press Limited.
- Ferris, Tom (2004) [1961]. British Railways Volume 4 - Bewdley To Blaenau (DVD). demanddvd. DEMDVD084.
- Green, C.C. (1996) [1983]. North Wales Branch Line Album. Shepperton: Ian Allan Publishing. ISBN 978-0-7110-1252-3.
- Jones, Ivor Wynne; Hatherill, Gordon (1977). Llechwedd and other Ffestiniog Railways. Blaenau Ffestiniog: Quarry Tours Ltd. ISBN 978-0-9502895-9-5.
- Morton Lloyd, M.E. (April 1961). Cooke, B.W.C. (ed.). "Farewell to Bala-Blaenau Branch". The Railway Magazine. 107 (720). London: Tothill Press Limited. ISSN 0033-8923.
- Turner, Alun (2003). Gwynedd's Lost Railways. Catrine: Stenlake Publishing. ISBN 978-1-84033-259-9.
