= Festiniog and Blaenau Railway =

Disused railway in Wales

Coordinates: 52.988°N 3.927°W

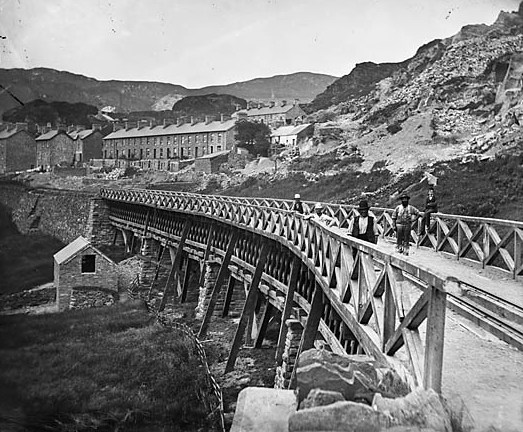
- Wooden viaduct on the Festiniog and Blaenau Railway near Tan-y-Manod, c. 1875

Overview
- Headquarters: Blaenau Ffestiniog
- Locale: Gwynedd, Wales
- Dates of operation: 1868–1883
- Successor: Great Western Railway

Technical
- Track gauge: 1 ft 11 3/4 in (603 mm)

The Festiniog and Blaenau Railway (F&BR) was a narrow gauge railway built in 1868 to connect the town of Blaenau Ffestiniog in Wales with the slate quarries around Tanymanod and the village of Llan Ffestiniog, 3 1/2 miles (5.6 km) to the south. At Blaenau Ffestiniog it made a direct connection with the Festiniog Railway (FR) with which it was closely associated during its fifteen-year life. The railway was purchased by the Bala and Festiniog Railway in 1883 and converted to 4 ft 8 1/2 in (1,435 mm) standard gauge to extend the Bala Ffestiniog line, a branch of the GWR's line from Ruabon to Barmouth.

The promoters owned the land on which the line was built, so no parliamentary process was needed to incorporate the company or proceed with building, though the operators sought and obtained Board of Trade inspection before opening as if that were a statutory requirement.

Officially the line's gauge was 1 ft 11 3/4 in (603 mm), however, a Board of Trade inspection in 1868 recorded it as 1 ft 11 1/4 in (591 mm), as did the locomotives' manufacturer's catalogue, repeated in the magazine "Engineer". A survey of the line conducted by Vignes in 1878 gave the gauge as 1 ft 11 1/2 in (597 mm). In practice the tolerances were sufficiently wide to allow Festiniog Railway locomotives and rolling stock to use the line, but there is no record of F&BR stock venturing onto FR metals other than transit to Minffordd when their two locomotives made rare visits to Wolverhampton for heavy repair. They are unlikely to have made these trips along the FR in steam and may even have travelled on flat wagons.

== Origins ==
By the early 1860s Llan Ffestiniog had largely become a dormitory town supplying workers to the slate industry around Blaenau Ffestiniog. The quarries at Blaenau were connected to the harbour at Porthmadog by the recently built Festiniog Railway (FR) and as a result were able to significantly increase their output and profitability. However, the FR was struggling to cope ("hopelessly overburdened" according to the standard work on the F&BR) with the volume of traffic from the quarries and some owners – notably Samuel Holland, later to be a local MP – were looking for other outlets for their product at lower charges.

At the same time, several standard gauge railway companies were looking to extend their lines into the region to tap the demand for slate transport. In particular the GWR-backed Corwen and Bala Railway reached Bala, about 22 miles south of Blaenau in April 1868 and had ambitions to spread further. The LNWR were also making moves from the north, but that played no clear part in the F&BR story.

The quarries around Tanymanod – especially Craig Ddu – were not rail connected and were on the proposed route of a northward extension of the Corwen and Bala Railway. In October 1866 some quarry owners issued a prospectus announcing the formation of the Festiniog and Blaenau Railway Company to construct a line from Llan Ffestiniog to Blaenau where it would connect with the Ffestiniog Railway. In the short term this "poured water into a blocked drain" as the F&BR led only to the overstretched FR, but the line contained the seeds of at least two ambitions-cum-threats: it took a step towards the south where it might eventually meet the Corwen and Bala's ambitions from the south east and the same step south lent itself to ambitions to connect with the Cambrian Railways to the southwest. This latter bore at least legal fruit when the Merionethshire Railway gained parliamentary approval in the Merionethshire Railway Act 1871 (34 & 35 Vict. c. lxxii). That line would have continued from Llan Ffestiniog to a junction just north of Talsarnau, but no construction ever happened, "the threat of it had played its part". The prospectus made brief mention of the line being able to use the FR to "command a very large traffic in goods", but saved its most lavish imprecations for the passenger potential, notably for workmen ("very great") and tourists ("immense").

Although initially promoted as, in effect, a branch of the FR, the F&BR was built on a formation that was designed to be easily converted to standard gauge if and when an extension from the Corwen and Bala Railway approached from the south. Later writers sometimes look at the line's standard gauge successor's sinuous course and conclude it betrays its narrow gauge origins, but the trackbed and bridges were built to accommodate standard gauge trains without alteration and the line's curves' ruling minimum radius was 6 chains (120 m) as opposed to the FR's 2 chains (40 m). Even the line's steepest gradient of 1 in 68 was forced upon it by having to avoid obstacles, the original intention was to have a ruling gradient of 1 in 100. The maximum line speed of 12 miles per hour (19 km/h) was imposed by the Board of Trade. The largest feature which had to be rebuilt on conversion was the wooden viaduct between Tanymanod and Blaenau, not because it was too small, but because it was too flimsy. It was rebuilt in stone and stands to this day.

Some bridges were erected during the line's later narrow gauge years and on conversion, using metal parapets pre-cast at the Brymbo Foundry. Others of the type also existed on the standard gauge line approaching from Bala. In 2016 at least one such survived between Llan Ffestiniog and Trawsfynydd. There were connections at Board level between these railways and Brymbo.

== Opening ==
The line was offered to the Board of Trade for inspection on 25 April 1868, but the inspection was not made until 21 May, the report being issued on 26 May 1868, stipulating conditions regarding facing points and the viaduct. The Board of Trade followed up on 5 June, informing the company that it had no objection to opening for public traffic, though in fact a passenger service had started on 30 May anyway. For the F&BR's first three months they had to use FR locomotives on contract, as the F&BR's own locomotives were not ready.

The F&BR opened on 30 May 1868 and from 4 August the GWR began operating the Bala and Dolgelly Railway, giving them a route from Ruabon through Bala to Dolgelly (later rewritten as Dolgellau). They also started to plan the Bala and Festiniog Railway to link that line and Bala with Blaenau Ffestiniog, including working arrangements – implicitly mixed-gauge tracks – with the F&BR. On 28 July 1873 the Bala and Festiniog Railway Act 1873 (36 & 37 Vict. c. ccvii) allowed the construction of that line. As events would unfold mixed gauge would be used ten years later, but only as a temporary measure whilst the F&BR was being converted to standard gauge.

== Operations ==
As foreseen in the prospectus, the narrow gauge line's primary traffic was passengers, and workmen in particular, though there is nothing in the records to hint that the predicted "immense" tourist traffic ever materialised. Goods traffic was small by comparison. Receipts in 1879, for example, included £1409 from passengers against £416 for goods.. The staff were reduced almost immediately it opened, the intermediate stations becoming unmanned by 1869.

The February 1878 timetable differs little from that of 1873, showing that all trains called at all stations on the line, as follows

- Northbound ("Up")
  - four public trains running Monday to Saturday
  - an unadvertised morning workmen's train running Monday to Saturday
  - two public evening trains on Saturdays only
    - The journey time from Festiniog to Duffws (F&BR) was 20 minutes.
- Southbound ("Down")
  - four public trains running Monday to Saturday
  - a morning workmen's train running Monday to Saturday
  - two public evening trains on Saturdays only
  - a teatime workmen's train on Saturdays only
    - The journey time from Duffws (F&BR) to Festiniog was 20 minutes.
- There was no Sunday service.

Diphwys was the F&BR's Blaenau station and would become the site of the town's later GWR station, but it was not the Festiniog Railway's Duffws (FR) station. Through passengers from Festiniog (say) to Porthmadog Harbour would alight at the F&BR's Diphwys station and walk across Church Street in Blaenau to the Festiniog Railway's completely separate Duffws station. Most trains were timetabled to make this process workable, if tight. FR connecting trains were not held in the case of late running.

Despite the railway's short length and short life it appeared several times in the regional press as the victim of acts of god and man. A rock fall struck a passing train in 1878 and carriages were blown over in traffic in 1870 and 1881, fortunately none of these incidents caused injury. Snow stopped work in the quarries, railways and railway building in 1881 and gauge conversion work was set back by a flood in 1882. Gauge conversion work was delayed by land ownership issues in Blaenau and raised eyebrows for working on the Sabbath. The railway took people to court for trespass in 1871, 1876 and 1878, for breaking windows in 1871 and for drunken damage at Tan y Manod in 1873. A seven-year-old boy was prosecuted in 1882 for placing stones on the line.

== Ownership and finance ==
The railway made a working profit every year of its life except 1878/9, when exceptional expenses from 1877/8 showed in the accounts. These were from repairs to the viaduct and the Locomotive Department. At that time the directors were aware that they would face significant expenses for renewals before long and in July 1876 struck a prudent deal with the Bala and Festiniog Railway (and behind them, the GWR) who would approach from the southeast, the essence of which was that the Bala and Festiniog Railway would buy the F&BR for £14,000 within three years, take up the B&FR shares and pay the F&BR 5% per annum on the £14,000 until the sale was closed. Thereafter the F&BR's single biggest source of income was the £700 interest. The Bala and Festiniog appear to have agreed to this to get access to the F&BR's trackbed into Blaenau by agreement rather than by compulsory purchase and all the cost, delay and uncertainty that might entail; the F&BR got a very fair price given the bills for renewals which were imminent. From February 1878 onwards two sets of accounts were prepared with more than the usual level of opacity.

The standard gauge Bala and Festiniog line was very slow to get going, the first sod not being cut until August 1878. Therefore, they incurred significant parliamentary expenses both to gain extensions of time to complete the line and to obtain powers in the Great Western Railway Act 1880 (43 & 44 Vict. c. cxli) to absorb the F&BR (unopposed by the F&BR, as a result of the July 1876 agreement) which they received on 6 August 1880. This was followed on 23 May 1882 by the F&BR directors voluntarily winding up their company, which was "vested in" (taken over entirely by) the Bala and Festiniog on 13 April 1883. William Davies of Cae'r Blaidd, the F&BR manager, was appointed liquidator; he reported his work complete on 21 April 1884. William Davies was a shareholder and director of the F&BR, its manager and its liquidator.

== Conversion to standard gauge ==
The decision to convert the F&BR to standard gauge had been taken in March 1882 and work began on converting the F&BR's narrow gauge line to Blaenau to standard gauge in May. The standard gauge Bala and Festiniog Railway opened from Bala Junction to Llan Ffestiniog on 1 November 1882. During conversion a third rail was provided to enable the narrow gauge trains to continue operation until conversion was complete. Narrow gauge operation ceased on 5 September 1883. In some cases the third rail was removed and in others it was moved along sleepers to serve as check rails on curves. The formal standard gauge opening was on 10 September 1883, at which time the physical Festiniog and Blaenau Railway ceased to exist.

The conversion process was relatively easy because the F&BR had been built to standard gauge dimensions.

There were differences in location and names between narrow and standard gauge stations:

- The F&BR station at Llan Ffestiniog was Festiniog. It was about thirty feet lower, and one hundred feet West of its standard gauge replacement, also named Festiniog (a hundred years before Welsh spellings were widely adopted)
- The F&BR station at Manod was Tyddyngwyn, its replacement was Manod, slightly south of the Tyddyngwyn site
- The F&BR station at Tan-y-Manod was closed and not replaced as a passenger station, though the site was heavily developed by the GWR for slate transfer and locomotive servicing
- The F&BR station at Blaenau was Duffws (F&BR), its replacement was on the same site, being initially named Blaenau Festiniog. It was renamed Blaenau Ffestiniog Central in 1951, closed to passengers in 1960 and closed completely in 1961. It was demolished in the 1960s and in 1982 became the site of the wholly new BR/FR interchange station which thrives today.
- A temporary F&BR terminus was provided in Blaenau during at least part of the 1882-3 reconstruction period, when Diphwys (F&BR) and its environs were being utterly transformed. This was sited between Glynllifon Street. and Cwmbowydd Road.
- The other station on the route was Teigl Halt. This was opened by the GWR in 1931, forty eight years after the F&BR had passed into history.

== Route ==
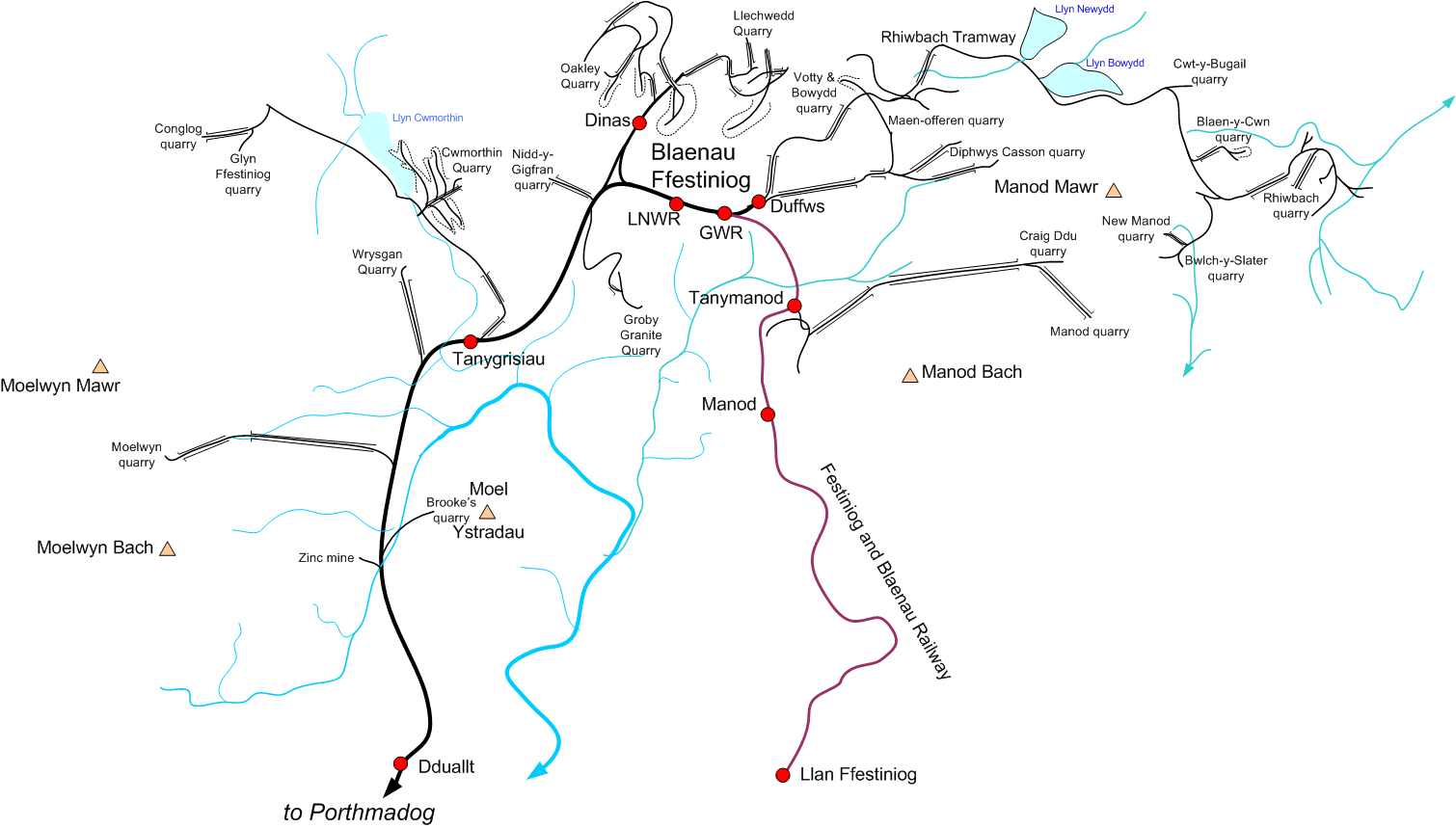
Narrow gauge railways in the Blaenau Ffestiniog area, showing the Festiniog and Blaenau Railway

== Signalling ==
Published photographs and a Duffws Signalbox diagram show signals at Diphwys (F&BR), Tan-y-Manod, Tyddyngwyn and Festiniog. There may have been others. The photographs show single posts with arms pointing left and right in the Ffestiniog Railway's then pattern. The painting on the arms suggests that trains passed to the left on loops. From at least 1874, BoT records show the line was operated on the "One engine in steam" method, which contradicts the 1868 Board of Trade's insistence that there be Train staff working. It is possible that trains were admitted to the line using the Festiniog's equipment, then run as sole occupants of the route, with points being operated by hand.

== Rolling stock ==
=== Locomotives ===
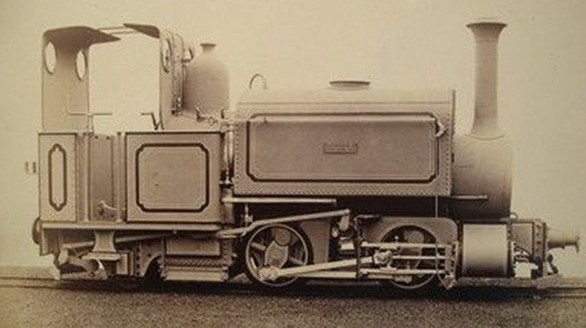
0-4-2ST locomotive No.2

Two identical steam locomotives were supplied by Manning Wardle of Leeds. These were 0-4-2STs, works numbers 259 and 260, both built in 1868. They were identified on the F&BR as No 1 and No 2. Boyd suggested they were named Nipper and Scorcher, but no evidence appears in writing or photographs, the plate being visible as the Manning Wardle Works plate as in the photograph alongside.

They were not delivered until three months after the line opened. Up to then Festiniog locomotives worked the line, and did so occasionally thereafter if traffic was heavy or the F&BR locomotives were being repaired. No.1 and No.2 worked for the remainder of the line's existence as a narrow gauge railway. After 1878 they paid visits to Wolverhampton for heavy repairs, travelling via the FR, Minffordd and the Cambrian. They were most probably scrapped at Swindon in 1884.

=== Passenger carriages ===
Four four-wheeled passenger carriages were supplied to the railway by the Ashbury Railway Carriage and Iron Company Ltd of Manchester and a further two were built by the GWR in 1878. They were slightly longer, wider and lower than the Ffestiniog Railway's four-wheel Ashbury carriages, with a slightly longer wheelbase according to GWR records. C. M. Holland made a virtue of their low height, as the wheels were recessed under the seats, giving a lower centre of gravity, smoother ride and more headroom. Both companies' carriages had distinctive Lindley oil lamps protruding from the roofs like tin cans. Four of the carriages were Third Class only (one contained a guard's compartment and brake), the other two had three compartments – two Second Class compartments on each side of a First Class one. The company had a seventh carriage, possibly for Directors' and VIP use, but no details survive.

There were also 20 workmen's open carriages built by J. H. Williams & Sons (later to become the Britannia Foundry) of Porthmadog. In 1878 the F&BR Board investigated adding roofs to them, though no record of that happening exists. The only photograph of these carriages has workmen and their families covering the vehicles, so little is known of their design, except that the seating was probably lateral.

=== Freight stock ===
The railway had eight wagons of similar design to the wagons used on the Ffestiniog Railway. Almost all the general freight and mineral traffic originated on or travelled to the FR using FR wagons. All slate traffic was destined for Porthmadog or Minffordd and it also travelled in FR slate wagons as did the output of all the other Ffestiniog Quarries.

=== Disposal ===
Following the winding-up of the F&BR company, the narrow gauge railway continued to operate under Bala and Festiniog management until conversion to standard gauge was complete. The stock comprising the two engines, six carriages and 19 workmen's carriages was offered for sale but no offers were received. The stock was then dispatched to Swindon in August 1884 for scrapping and in due course the GWR paid the Bala and Festiniog Railway the scrap value of £178 19s 8d.

== See also ==
- British narrow gauge railways

== Further material ==
- Jones, Ivor Wynne; Hatherill, Gordon (1977). Llechwedd and other Ffestiniog Railways. Blaenau Ffestiniog: Quarry Tours Ltd. ISBN 978-0-9502895-9-5.
