= James I. C. Boyd =

British historian and author

James Ian Craig Boyd
- Born: 31 March 1921
- Died: 20 February 2009 (aged 87)
- Occupations: Author, Historian

James Ian Craig Boyd (31 March 1921 – 20 February 2009) was an English author and narrow-gauge railway historian.

Boyd spent a lifetime researching and writing on narrow-gauge railways. His books on narrow-gauge railways in North and Mid Wales, the Isle of Man and Ireland are considered to be standard works on the subject. His books, published by The Oakwood Press since 1949, are rarely out of print, reflecting their importance to, and popularity with, railway historians and enthusiasts.

== Biography ==
Boyd was born on 31 July 1921 into a family long connected with the Scottish textile machinery industry. His lifelong work was considerably helped by an inheritance from his family, without which much of his work could not have been done.

In his formative years he had W. H. Auden as an English teacher and was taught mathematics and science by Geoffrey Hoyland, a qualified railway engineer, at The Downs School in Colwall. After school he took over the family textile business, then based in Manchester.

Boyd was an early volunteer on the Talyllyn Railway - the first volunteer-run heritage railway in the world. He organized the first regional working group of volunteers on the Talyllyn. In 1949, he published his first Narrow-Gauge Rails to Portmadoc which described the history of the recently closed Ffestiniog Railway. This was popular and inspired the successful efforts to preserve and re-open the railway. Much of his writing was focused on the 3 ft (914 mm) gauge railways of Ireland. Although his work is considered the standard for the railways covered, he did not always make it clear when his writing was factual and when it was his opinion of the facts.

Retiring from the textiles industry in the late 1960s, Boyd moved to Colwall and became a manager at the Downs School. At the same time, he was appointed to look after the 9 1/2 in (241 mm) gauge Downs Light Railway and started a twenty-year restoration that would ultimately result in his efforts being recognised with a miniature steam locomotive bearing his name. Boyd later retired from the school, but continued to fight to preserve the railway amidst Headmasters who failed to see the historical and educational importance, and led the formation of the Downs Light Railway Trust in 1983. Boyd continued to oversee the railway up to the millennium, despite suffering a stroke in the 1990s.

== Works ==
- Boyd, James I.C. (1949). Narrow Gauge Rails to Portmadoc: A Historical Survey of the Festiniog-Welsh Highland Railway and its Ancillaries. Headington: The Oakwood Press. ASIN B0007JK554.
- —— (1949). Narrow Gauge Rails to Portmadoc. Oakwood Press.
- —— (1956). The Festiniog Railway. Vol. 1 (1 ed.). Oakwood Press.
- —— (1959). The Festiniog Railway. Vol. 2 (1 ed.). Oakwood Press.
- —— (1975) [1959]. The Festiniog Railway 1800 - 1974; Vol. 1 - History and Route. The British Narrow Gauge Railway. Blandford: The Oakwood Press. ISBN 978-0-85361-167-7. OCLC 2074549. B1A.
- —— (1975) [1959]. The Festiniog Railway 1800 - 1974; Vol. 2 - Locomotives and Rolling Stock; Quarries and Branches: Rebirth 1954-74. The British Narrow Gauge Railway. Blandford: The Oakwood Press. ISBN 978-0-85361-168-4. OCLC 874117875. B1B.
- —— (1962). Isle of Man Railway.
- —— (1970) [1965]. Narrow Gauge Railways in Mid-Wales. The British Narrow Gauge Railway (2nd ed.). Lingfield, Surrey: The Oakwood Press. ISBN 978-0-85361-024-3. OCLC 499283322. No.3.
- —— (1972). Narrow Gauge Railway Museum.
- —— (1972). Narrow Gauge Railways in South Caernarvonshire.
- —— (1978). On the Isle of Man Narrow Gauge.
- —— (1990) [1972]. Narrow Gauge Railways in North Caernarvonshire, Volume 1: The West. Headington: The Oakwood Press. ISBN 978-0-85361-273-5. OCLC 650247345.
- ——. Narrow Gauge Railways in North Caernarvonshire, The Penrhyn Quarry Railways. Vol. 2. ISBN 0-85361-312-5.
- ——. Narrow Gauge Railways in North Caernarvonshire, The Dinorwic Quarry and Railways, Great Orme Tramway and other rail systems. Vol. 3. ISBN 0-85361-328-1.
- —— (1988) [1972]. Narrow Gauge Railways in South Caernarvonshire – Volume 1. Headington: The Oakwood Press. ISBN 978-0-85361-365-7. OCLC 20417464.
- —— (1989) [1972]. Narrow Gauge Railways in South Caernarvonshire - Volume 2: The Welsh Highland Railway. Headington: The Oakwood Press. ISBN 978-0-85361-383-1. OCLC 145018679.
- ——. The Isle of Man Railway, Pre-1873-1904. Vol. 1. ISBN 0-85361-444-X.
- ——. The Isle of Man Railway, 1905-1994. Vol. 2. ISBN 0-85361-469-5.
- ——. The Isle of Man Railway, The Routes and Rolling Stock. Vol. 3. ISBN 0-85361-479-2.
- —— (1978). On the Welsh Narrow Gauge. ISBN 0-85153-340-X.
- —— (1988). Talyllyn Railway.
- ——. Schull and Skibbereen Railway. ISBN 0-85361-534-9.
- —— (1991). The Wrexham, Mold and Connah's Quay Railway, including The Buckley Railway. Oakwood Library of Railway History. Headington: The Oakwood Press. ISBN 978-0-85361-417-3. OCLC 961022337. OL83.
- ——. Don't Stand Up In The Tunnel, The Story of the Downs Light Railway and its young Engineers 1925-2001. ISBN 1-900622-04-1.
- —— (2007). Saga by Rail.
