= Frongoch (disambiguation) =

Frongoch is a village near Bala, in Gwynedd (formerly Merionethshire), Wales.

Frongoch may also refer to:

- Frongoch internment camp, a prisoner of war camp near Frongoch village during the First World War
- Frongoch railway station, a railway station serving Frongoch village

== Mining ==
- Frongoch quarry, Aberdyfi, a slate quarry near Aberdyfi in Gwynedd, Wales
- Frongoch quarry, Bala, a slate quarry near Frongoch village; see Slate industry in Wales
- Frongoch mine, Ceredigion, a lead and zinc mine near Pont-rhyd-y-groes in Ceredigion (formerly Cardiganshire), Wales
