= Trawsfynydd Camp railway station =

Disused railway station in Gwynedd, Wales

Trawsfynydd Camp
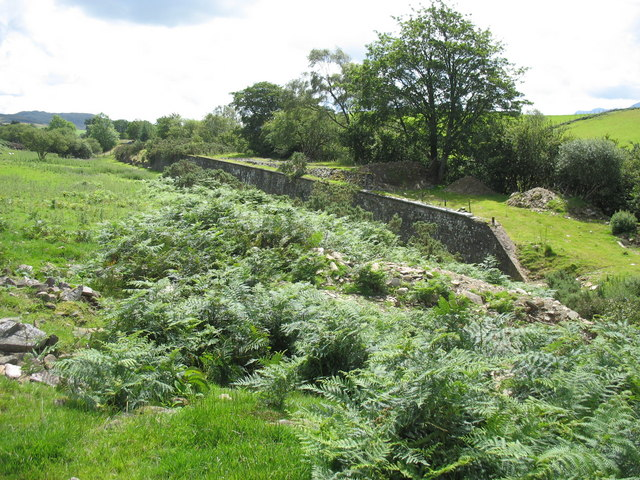
- Remaining platform of the dismantled station

General information
- Location: Trawsfynydd, Gwynedd; Wales
- Coordinates: 52.9070°N 3.9149°W
- Grid reference: SH 713 361
- Platforms: 2, plus loading bay

Other information
- Status: Disused

History
- Original company: Great Western Railway

Key dates
- November 1911: Opened for military traffic
- 4 January 1960: line closed for regular passenger services
- 28 January 1961: line closed completely
Location

Trawsfynydd Camp railway station, sometimes referred to as Trawsfynydd Military station served the Trawsfynydd Artillery range at Bronaber, south of Trawsfynydd in Gwynedd, Wales. The station never opened for civilian traffic.

== Origins ==
In 1882 the Bala and Ffestiniog Railway opened the line from Bala Junction to a temporary terminus at Festiniog, Trawsfynydd was one of the stations opened with the line. At Festiniog passengers had to transfer to narrow gauge trains if they wished to continue northwards. To do this people travelling from Trawsfynydd to Blaenau or beyond walked the few yards from the standard gauge train to the narrow gauge train much as they do today between the Conwy Valley Line and the Ffestiniog Railway at Blaenau Ffestiniog.

The following year the narrow gauge line was converted to standard gauge, but narrow gauge trains continued to run until 5 September 1883 using a third rail. Standard gauge trains first ran through from Bala and Trawsfynydd to Blaenau Ffestiniog on 10 September 1883. The line was taken over by the Great Western Railway in 1910.

== Military usage ==
The line through Trawsfynydd had been established for around twenty years when an artillery training camp was set up at Bryn Golau, on the southern outskirts of Trawsfynydd. It was replaced in 1906 by a larger camp further south at Rhiw Goch, which was more widely referred to as being at Bronaber, after the nearby settlement of that name.

Artillery of the period required the transportation of men, horses, field guns and ammunition, together with supplies such as fodder. As a training camp the turnover of men in particular was considerable, many attending for two week "camps". The area is remote and roads remain few, so the railway was the obvious means to move men and materials. For a few years military traffic was handled at Trawsfynydd, but it was not well suited to the sharp and growing peaks of arrivals and departures. In 1910 the railway decided to build additional, specialised platforms and ramps on the northern side of the bridge which was at the northern end of the conventional station; these were opened in Summer 1911 and became known as "Trawsfynydd Camp station", though that name does not appear on documents such as Working Timetables.

The station had no need of ticket offices or waiting rooms. All traffic was by booked special trains exclusively for military personnel, though the locomotives, rolling stock and crew were all Great Western. The only buildings were a corrugated iron warehouse, a guards' room and two lavatories. Three unusual features were provided:

- several water troughs on the wide and gently sloping approach road
- a wooden "screen" made of fencing material with all vertical timbers edge to edge. This was placed between the single track running line and the military station. Its purpose was said to be to prevent horses being frightened by the sight of passing locomotives.
- a "Gun Wharf" which consisted of a bay platform where open-ended vehicles carrying equipment such as artillery pieces could be wheeled straight off the end onto the platform

Personnel disembarked onto the "Troop Platform", which was an island with the screen to one side. Horses detrained onto the "Horse Landing" which led straight to the water troughs and the road to the camp. Guns and other large equipment was unloaded at the Gun Wharf, also known as the Gun Platform. The trains shown in published photographs often mixed carriages, horse boxes and wagons. They were routinely much the longest trains to use the line and needed double-heading or the use of more powerful locomotives normally excluded from the route.

Traffic was heavy during the World Wars and considerable between. The Harlech Military Railway article mentions connections with the Trawsfynydd camp, but it is unlikely that this involved rail traffic, because the distance by road is short, but by rail is very long.

Traffic reduced after 1945, but was considerable for some time as the camp was used to dispose of unused artillery shells by firing them on the range. Military traffic had petered out by the late 1950s and the camp was closed as a military establishment in 1957 or 1958, only to reopen "almost overnight" to house workers building Trawsfynydd nuclear power station. These people were bussed to work, bringing no custom to the railway except when coming to or leaving from their distant homes.

The line from Bala north to Trawsfynydd was designated in the restrictive "Blue" weight limit, with the section from Trawsfynydd to Blaenau limited even more tightly to "Yellow". The literature conjectures on overweight classes being used on troop trains, but no solid claim or photograph has been published. Photos of heavy troop trains show 0-6-0STs double-heading, Only four steam age photos of the line show anything other than an 0-4-2 or 0-6-0 tank engine, three being of GWR 2251 Class 0-6-0s taken in the 1940s on ordinary civilian workings. The only one of anything larger is of a "43XX" 2-6-0 on a military train at Trawsfynydd Camp station. That class were nevertheless classified as "Blue". As the 1950s passed "5700" and "7400" 0-6-0PTs stole the show, exemplified by 9610 at Festiniog in the 1950s. 0-4-2T engines "..suffer[ed] from limited tank capacity and power."

In 1907 an accident occurred involving a military train in which both drivers and two soldiers were injured.

With the camp closed the station had no residual purpose except for siding space.

== Closure ==
The line through the station closed to passengers in January 1960 and to freight a year later. In 1964 the line was still technically "operational" northwards from the station in case it reopened for freight or military traffic, but none materialised and the tracks were lifted northwards to the site of Trawsfynydd Lake Halt. Tracks north of that halt sprung back to life in 1964 to serve Trawsfynydd nuclear power station.

By 2017 the site had been put to agricultural use and was hardly recognisable as a former station.

Preceding station	Disused railways	Following station
Trawsfynydd Lake Halt; Line and station closed	Great Western Railway; Bala and Ffestiniog Railway	Trawsfynydd; Line and station closed

== Further material ==
- Baughan, Peter E. (1980). A Regional History of the Railways of Great Britain: Volume 11 North and Mid Wales (1st ed.). Newton Abbot: David & Charles. ISBN 978-0-7153-7850-2. OCLC 6823219.
- Boyd, James I.C. (October 1959). Mansell, K.G. (ed.). "Bala & Festiniog Section - W.R.". Railway World. 20 (233). London: Railway World Limited.
- Coleford, I. C. (November 2010). Smith, Martin (ed.). "By GWR to Blaenau Ffestiniog (Part Two)". Railway Bylines. 15 (12). Radstock: Irwell Press Limited.
- Ferris, Tom (2004) [1961]. British Railways Volume 4 - Bewdley To Blaenau (DVD). demanddvd. DEMDVD084.
