= Frongoch railway station =

Disused railway station in Gwynedd, Wales

Frongoch
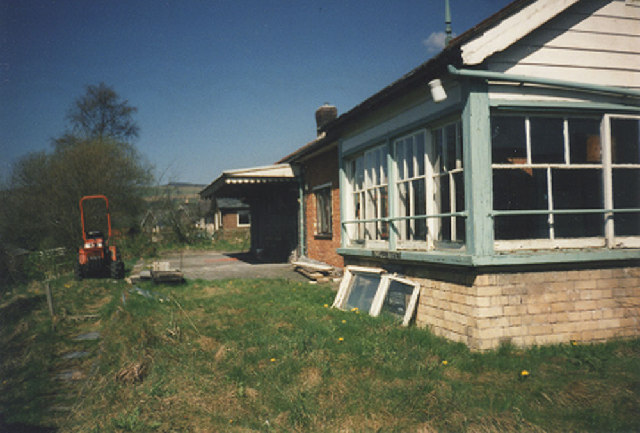
- The former railway station in 2003

General information
- Location: Frongoch, west of Bala, Gwynedd; Wales
- Coordinates: 52.9388°N 3.6332°W
- Grid reference: SH 903 392
- Platforms: 1

Other information
- Status: Disused

History
- Original company: Bala and Festiniog Railway
- Pre-grouping: Great Western Railway

Key dates
- 1 November 1882: Opened
- 4 January 1960: Closed to passengers
- 28 January 1961: Closed completely
Location

Frongoch railway station served the village of Frongoch on the Great Western Railway's Bala Ffestiniog Line in Gwynedd, Wales.

The station closed to passengers in January 1960, and to freight a year later, with the last revenue-earning train on 27 January 1961.

== Origins ==
In 1882 the Bala and Ffestiniog Railway opened the line from Bala Junction to a temporary terminus at Festiniog, Frongoch was one of the stations opened with the line. At Festiniog passengers had to transfer to narrow gauge trains if they wished to continue northwards. To do this people travelling from Bala to Blaenau or beyond walked the few yards from the standard gauge train to the narrow gauge train much as they do today between the Conwy Valley Line and the Ffestiniog Railway at Blaenau Ffestiniog.

The following year the narrow gauge line was converted to standard gauge, but narrow gauge trains continued to run until 5 September 1883 using a third rail. Standard gauge trains first ran through from Bala to Blaenau Ffestiniog on 10 September 1883. The line was taken over by the Great Western Railway (GWR) in 1910.

The station remained part of the GWR through the Grouping of 1923. It passed to the Western Region of British Railways on nationalisation in 1948 and was closed by the British Transport Commission, primarily because the line was to be flooded by damming between Arenig and Frongoch to create Llyn Celyn.

== Description ==
The single platform carried both a station building and a signalbox. A siding ran off from the Blaenau end of the platform leading to a goods warehouse and cattle pens. The line crossed the Afon Tryweryn by a metal bridge a short distance from the Bala end of the platform.

The station was the archetypal country station, but served three short-lived unusual traffics:

- in the last years of the Nineteenth Century whisky was conveyed from a distillery near the station.
- in the First World War German prisoners of war were carried to and from a camp in Frongoch, and
- after 1916 Irish Republican internees were carried to and from the same camp, now redesignated as the Frongoch internment camp, the Germans having been moved elsewhere.

Despite Royal connections the whisky venture is said to have failed in part because it was founded at the height of "chapel building mania" in North Wales.

== Passenger services ==
The September 1959 timetable shows

- Northbound
  - three trains calling at all stations from Bala to Blaenau on Monday to Saturday
  - an extra evening train calling at all stations from Bala to Blaenau on Saturday
  - a Monday to Friday train calling at all stations from Bala to Trawsfynydd
- The journey time from Bala to Frongoch was around 6 minutes.
- Southbound
  - three trains calling at all stations from Blaenau to Bala on Monday to Saturday
  - two extra trains calling at all stations from Blaenau to Bala on Saturday
  - an extra train calling at all stations from Blaenau to Trawsfynydd on Saturday evening
  - a Monday to Friday train calling at all stations from Blaenau to Bala, except Llafar, Bryn-celynog and Cwm Prysor Halts
- The journey time from Blaenau to Frongoch was around 70 minutes, except for one Saturdays Only train which took longer because it sat at Trawsfynydd for 25 minutes.
- There was no Sunday service.

After the Second World War at the latest most trains were composed of two carriages, with one regular turn comprising just one brake third coach. At least one train along the line regularly ran as a mixed train, with a second between Bala and Arenig. By that time such trains had become rare on Britain's railways. Workmen's trains had been a feature of the line from the outset; they were the Festiniog and Blaenau Railway's biggest source of revenue. Such a service between Trawsfynydd and Blaenau Ffestiniog survived to the line's closure to passengers in 1960. Up to 1930 at the earliest such services used dedicated, lower standard, coaches which used a specific siding at Blaenau where the men boarded from and alighted to the ballast.

== Closure ==
The station closed in January 1960 but freight services between Bala and Blaenau continued for a further year, the last train of all passing on 27 January 1961. The track though the station was lifted in the 1960s.

In 1964 the line reopened from Blaenau southwards to a siding near the site of Trawsfynydd Lake Halt where a large ("Goliath") gantry was erected to load and unload traffic for the then new Trawsfynydd nuclear power station. The main goods transported were nuclear fuel rods carried in nuclear flasks. The new facility was sixteen route miles north of Frongoch, so the reopening brought no reprieve.

== Special trains ==
Rail enthusiasts' special trains traversed the line from time to time, notably the "last train" from Bala to Blaenau Ffestiniog and return on 22 January 1961.

== The station site in the 21st Century ==
In 2015 the station building and signal box were in use as a private residence.

The station building was converted to a holiday home during the early 1970s when it was rescued from complete dilapidation. Initially the signal box was converted and the local council agreed that 2½ people could sleep in it. The main station had a small extension added to the end to house a bathroom and the goods warehouse was demolished to make way for several homes.

In 2015 the trackbed in both directions from the station was clearly defined both on satellite imagery and on the ground.

== The future ==
Since 2000 there have been at least two attempts to put the mothballed section of the line to use, but none of these came close to Frongoch. As the line of route to the west has been severed by Llyn Celyn the prospects of revival must be very remote.

Preceding station	Disused railways	Following station
Tyddyn Bridge Halt; Line and station closed	Great Western Railway; Bala and Festiniog Railway	Bala; Line and station closed

== Further material ==
- Coleford, I. C. (November 2010). Smith, Martin (ed.). "By GWR to Blaenau Ffestiniog (Part Two)". Railway Bylines. 15 (12). Radstock: Irwell Press Limited.
- Ferris, Tom (2004) [1961]. British Railways Volume 4 - Bewdley To Blaenau (DVD). demanddvd. DEMDVD084.
- Shannon, Paul; Hillmer, John (1999). North Wales (British Railways Past & Present) Part 2. Kettering: Past & Present Publishing Ltd. ISBN 978-1-85895-163-8. No 36.
- Turner, Alun (2003). Gwynedd's Lost Railways. Catrine: Stenlake Publishing. ISBN 978-1-84033-259-9.
