= Tyddyn Bridge Halt railway station =

Disused railway station in Gwynedd, Wales

Tyddyn Bridge Halt

General information
- Location: West of Frongoch, Bala, Gwynedd; Wales
- Coordinates: 52.9461°N 3.6693°W
- Grid reference: SH 878 401
- Platforms: 1

Other information
- Status: Disused

History
- Original company: Great Western Railway

Key dates
- 1 November 1882: Line opened
- 1 December 1930: Halt opened for passengers only
- 4 January 1960: Halt closed
- 28 January 1961: Line closed
Location

Tyddyn Bridge Halt was a railway station which served the village of Frongoch, Gwynedd, Wales. It was on the Great Western Railway's (GWR's) Bala Ffestiniog Line in Gwynedd, Wales.

== Origins ==
In 1882 the Bala and Ffestiniog Railway opened the line from Bala Junction to a temporary terminus at Festiniog, Trawsfynydd was one of the stations opened with the line; the future Tyddyn Bridge Halt would be on this line. At Festiniog passengers had to transfer to narrow gauge trains if they wished to continue northwards. To do this people travelling from Bala to Blaenau or beyond walked the few yards from the standard gauge train to the narrow gauge train much as they do today between the Conwy Valley Line and the Ffestiniog Railway at Blaenau Ffestiniog.

The following year the narrow gauge line was converted to standard gauge, but narrow gauge trains continued to run until 5 September 1883 using a third rail. Standard gauge trains first ran through from Bala to Blaenau Ffestiniog on 10 September 1883. The line was taken over by the Great Western Railway in 1910.

Tyddyn Bridge Halt was one of the 198 opened by the Great Western Railway (GWR) between 1927 and 1939, spurred by rising competition with buses and, to a lesser degree, cars. The prime reason in this case was to serve walkers. The halt stood in a very thinly populated rural area with no obvious source of traffic; conversely, the people who did live, work and increasingly take leisure activities in the area had no other obvious means of transport.

== Description ==
The unstaffed halt's single platform was made of wood. It was a mere 70 feet (21 m) long, so drivers had instructions to stop ensuring the guard's compartment was alongside. The amenities provided were a platform shelter and two oil lamps. The station nameboard was double faced and could therefore be read by people on the platform and trains and from the rear as a station sign by people on surrounding land. The halt stood immediately off the eastern end of the bridge of the same name, which crossed the Afon Tryweryn. The halt was only accessible by path from the Bala to Capel Celyn road.

== Services ==
The September 1959 timetable shows

- Northbound
  - three trains calling at all stations from Bala to Blaenau on Monday to Saturday
  - an extra evening train calling at all stations from Bala to Blaenau on Saturday
  - a Monday to Friday train calling at all stations from Bala to Trawsfynydd
- The journey time from Bala to Tyddyn Bridge Halt was around 10 minutes.
- Southbound
  - three trains calling at all stations from Blaenau to Bala on Monday to Saturday
  - two extra trains calling at all stations from Blaenau to Bala on Saturday
  - an extra train calling at all stations from Blaenau to Trawsfynydd on Saturday evening
  - a Monday to Friday train calling at all stations from Blaenau to Bala, except Llafar, Bryn-celynog and Cwm Prysor Halts
- The journey time from Blaenau to Tyddyn Bridge Halt was around 67 minutes, except for one Saturdays Only train which took longer because it sat at Trawsfynydd for 25 minutes.
- There was no Sunday service.

In 1935 the Ministry of Transport stated that the halt was used by 50 passengers per week.

After the Second World War at the latest most trains were composed of two carriages, with one regular turn comprising just one brake third coach. At least one train along the line regularly ran as a mixed train, with a second between Bala and Arenig. By that time such trains had become rare on Britain's railways. Workmen's trains had been a feature of the line from the outset; they were the Ffestiniog and Blaenau Railway's biggest source of revenue. Such a service between Trawsfynydd and Blaenau Ffestiniog survived to the line's closure to passengers in 1960. Up to 1930 at the earliest such services used dedicated, lower standard, coaches which used a specific siding at Blaenau where the men boarded from and alighted to the ballast.

== Closure ==
The halt closed in January 1960 but freight trains between Bala and Blaenau continued to pass the site for a further year, the last train of all passing on 27 January 1961. The track though the halt was lifted in the 1960s.

In 1964 the line reopened from Blaenau southwards to a siding near the site of Trawsfynydd Lake Halt where a large ("Goliath") gantry was erected to load and unload traffic for the then new Trawsfynydd nuclear power station. The main goods transported were nuclear fuel rods carried in nuclear flasks. The new facility was over fourteen route miles north of Tyddyn Bridge Halt, so the reopening brought no reprieve.

== Controversy ==
Building the reservoir was very controversial at the time and remains as a symbol in some minds to this day.

== Special trains ==
Rail enthusiasts' special trains traversed the line from time to time, notably the "last train" from Bala to Blaenau Ffestiniog and return on 22 January 1961.

== The station site in the 21st century ==
The site of the halt was subsequently buried under the Llyn Celyn dam wall, the construction of which led to the closure of the line in 1961. By 2014 much of the trackbed was detectable both on satellite imagery and on the ground. It also appears when the waters of Llyn Celyn fall in prolonged dry weather.

Preceding station	Disused railways	Following station
Capel Celyn Halt; Line and station closed	Great Western Railway; Bala and Festiniog Railway	Frongoch; Line and station closed

== Further material ==
- Coleford, I. C. (November 2010b). Smith, Martin (ed.). "By GWR to Blaenau Ffestiniog Part Two". Railway Bylines. 15 (12). Radstock: Irwell Press Limited.
- Ferris, Tom (2004) [1961]. British Railways Volume 4 - Bewdley To Blaenau (DVD). demanddvd. DEMDVD084.
- Turner, Alun (2003). Gwynedd's Lost Railways. Catrine: Stenlake Publishing. ISBN 978-1-84033-259-9.
