= Trawsfynydd railway station =

Disused railway station in Gwynedd, Wales

Trawsfynydd
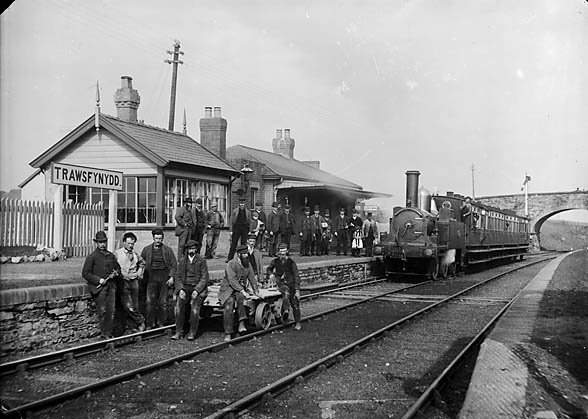
- Trawsfynydd railway station in the 1880s

General information
- Location: Trawsfynydd, Gwynedd; Wales
- Coordinates: 52.9061°N 3.9137°W
- Grid reference: SH 714 360
- Platforms: 2

Other information
- Status: Disused

History
- Original company: Bala and Festiniog Railway
- Pre-grouping: Great Western Railway

Key dates
- 1 November 1882: Opened
- 1911: Military platforms opened
- 4 January 1960: Closed to passengers
- 28 January 1961: Line and station closed
Location

Trawsfynydd railway station served the village of Trawsfynydd, Gwynedd, Wales.

== Origins ==
In 1882 the Bala and Ffestiniog Railway opened the line from Bala Junction to a temporary terminus at Festiniog, Trawsfynydd was one of the stations opened with the line. At Festiniog passengers had to transfer to narrow gauge trains if they wished to continue northwards. To do this people travelling from Trawsfynydd to Blaenau or beyond walked the few yards from the standard gauge train to the narrow gauge train much as they do today between the Conwy Valley Line and the Ffestiniog Railway at Blaenau Ffestiniog.

The following year the narrow gauge line was converted to standard gauge, but narrow gauge trains continued to run until 5 September 1883 using a 3-rail dual gauge track. Standard gauge trains first ran through from Bala and Trawsfynydd to Blaenau Ffestiniog on 10 September 1883.

== Station facilities ==
Trawsfynydd was the largest intermediate settlement and station on the route. On the line as a whole only Bala, Festiniog and Trawsfynydd had two platforms and only Bala, Trawsfynydd and the goods yard at Tan-y-Manod in Blaenau had an engine shed, the last two only being capable of housing a single locomotive. Trawsfynydd shed - a sub-shed of Croes Newydd - was proposed for closure in 1955, but was reprieved due to the strength of local opposition, whose key argument was that having such a shed enabled the railway to take action to prevent blockages in the event of sudden or prolonged snow - a noted feature of the upper reaches of the line.

The station buildings at Trawsfynydd were on the Down (northbound) side and provided a ticket office, waiting room, a lavatory and a urinal as well as rooms for staff use and a substantial signalbox on the platform. The Up platform had a waiting room. A goods shed backed onto the engine shed. The site was dominated by a very large water tank on top of the embankment on the Up side. Both platforms carried a water crane.

The route was single track throughout. The stations at Bala, Arenig, Trawsfynydd and Festiniog had two platforms, each with its own track. This both allowed for potential traffic and provided passing loops. A fifth loop was provided between 1908 and 1950 immediately north of Cwm Prysor, when intermittent heavy military traffic to and from Trawsfynydd Camp was likely.

== Services ==
The September 1959 timetable shows

- Northbound
  - three trains calling at all stations from Bala to Blaenau on Monday to Saturday
  - an extra evening train calling at all stations from Bala to Blaenau on Saturday
  - a Monday to Friday train calling at all stations from Bala to Trawsfynydd
    - The journey time from Bala to Trawsfynydd was around 50 minutes.
- Southbound
  - three trains calling at all stations from Blaenau to Bala on Monday to Saturday
  - two extra trains calling at all stations from Blaenau to Bala on Saturday
  - an extra train calling at all stations from Blaenau to Trawsfynydd on Saturday evening
  - a Monday to Friday train calling at all stations from Blaenau to Bala, except Llafar, Bryn-celynog and Cwm Prysor Halts
    - The journey time from Blaenau to Trawsfynydd was around 30 minutes.
- There was no Sunday service.

After the Second World War at the latest most trains were composed of two carriages, with one regular turn comprising just one brake third coach. At least one train along the line regularly ran as a mixed train, with a second between Bala and Arenig. By that time such trains had become rare on Britain's railways. Workmen's trains had been a feature of the line from the outset; they were the Festiniog and Blaenau Railway's biggest source of revenue. Such a service between Trawsfynydd and Blaenau Ffestiniog survived to the line's closure to passengers in 1960. Up to 1930 at the earliest such services used dedicated, lower standard, coaches which used a specific siding at Blaenau where the men boarded from and alighted to the ballast.

The line from Bala north to Trawsfynydd was designated in the restrictive "Blue" weight limit, with the section from Trawsfynydd to Blaenau limited even more tightly to "Yellow". The literature conjectures on overweight classes being used on troop trains, but no solid claim or photograph has been published. Only two steam age photos of the line show anything other than an 0-4-2 or 0-6-0 tank engine, they being of GWR 2251 Class 0-6-0s taken in the 1940s. As the 1950s passed "5700" and "7400" 0-6-PTs stole the show, exemplified by 9610 at Festiniog in the 1950s. 0-4-2T engines "..suffer[ed] from limited tank capacity and power."

== The station and the Army ==
The station was unusual in having separate platforms over 150 yards to the north for a nearby army camp. These are treated separately as Trawsfynydd Camp railway station. In 1907 an accident occurred involving a military train in which both drivers and two soldiers were injured.

== Closure ==
By the 1950s the line was deemed unremunerative. A survey undertaken in 1956 and 1957 found that the average daily numbers of passengers boarding and alighting were:

- Blaenau Ffestiniog Central 62 and 65
- Manod Halt 7 and 4
- Teigl Halt 5 and 5
- Festiniog 28 and 26
- Maentwrog Road 8 and 6
- Trawsfynydd Lake Halt 1 and 1
- Trawsfynydd 28 and 24
- Llafar Halt 2 and 2
- Bryn-celynog Halt 2 and 2
- Cwm Prysor Halt 3 and 3
- Arenig 5 and 5
- Capel Celyn Halt 7 and 8
- Tyddyn Bridge Halt 4 and 6
- Frongoch 18 and 15
- Bala 65 and 58

Military traffic had ended and, apart from a finite contract to bring cement to Blaenau in connection with the construction of Ffestiniog Power Station freight traffic was not heavy, most arriving and leaving Bala did so from and to the south and that to Blaenau could be handled from the Conwy Valley Line northwards.

In 1957 Parliament authorised Liverpool Corporation to flood a section of the line by damming the Afon Tryweryn. Monies were made available to divert the route round the dam, but it was decided that improving the road from Bala to Llan Ffestiniog would be of greater benefit. Road transport alternatives were established for groups such as schoolchildren and workers. The plans afoot for rail serving Trawsfynydd nuclear power station were to be catered for by building the long-discussed cross-town link between the two Blaenau standard gauge stations. The estimated financial savings to be made were £23,300 by withdrawing the passenger service and £7000 in renewal charges.

The station closed to passengers in January 1960 and to rail freight a year later, though it remained open for freight carried by road until 4 May 1964. In that year the line was still technically "operational" northwards from the station in case it reopened for freight or military traffic, but none materialised and the tracks were lifted northwards to the site of Trawsfynydd Lake Halt. Tracks north of that halt sprung back to life in 1964 to serve Trawsfynydd nuclear power station.

A notable "last train" special ran from Bala to Blaenau Ffestiniog and return on 22 January 1961.

== The station site in the 21st Century ==
By 2015 the station building was a private residence. The adjoining goods yard and military station site were in agricultural use. The engine shed was still standing in 1999, used as a store.

== The future ==
Between 2000 and 2011 there were at least two attempts to put part of the remaining line to use, but neither of these aspired to reach Trawsfynydd. As the line of route to the south has been severed by Llyn Celyn the prospects of revival must be very remote. In February 2012, there was a trial of a velorail (pedal powered train) on the line but this seems to have been short-lived.

Fresh moves to reopen the line from Blaenau as far south as Trawsfynydd began in September 2016, with the formation of The Trawsfynydd Railway Company Ltd and its supporting society the Blaenau Ffestiniog and Trawsfynydd Railway Society. On 21 September at least one regional newspaper reported that "Volunteers are set to start work this weekend on clearing vegetation from the trackbed between Blaenau Ffestiniog and Trawsfynydd." The company was quoted as saying "We have been given a licence by Network Rail to clear and survey the line." Since then the group have established a presence in Blaenau Ffestiniog as they clear the section of line between Cwm Bowydd Road crossing and the station in Blaenau Ffestiniog. By mid-October 2016 the company had achieved six working days of track clearance. After the society's meeting on the 28th Jan 2017 they were given the go ahead to start on stage two of the project and to create a base to work from at Maentwrog Road. One week later On Saturday 4th Feb 2017 work started clearing the site at Maentwrog Road with Peter Cornes and his plant hire company from Crewe offering their time to clear the track with their fleet of mini diggers.

Preceding station	Disused railways	Following station
Trawsfynydd Camp; Line and station closed	Great Western Railway; Bala and Festiniog Railway	Llafar Halt; Line and station closed

== Gallery ==
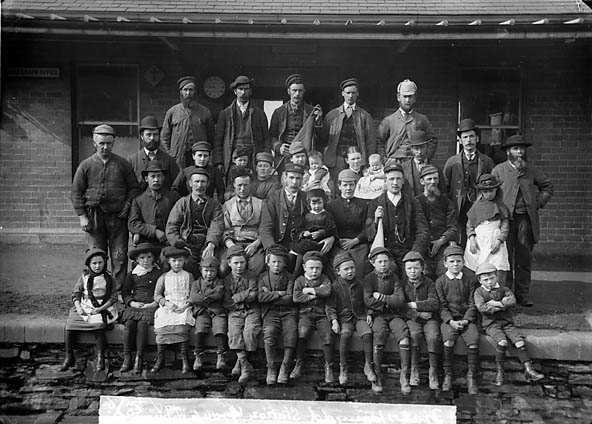
Station staff and families in 1888

== Further material ==
- Baughan, Peter E. (1980). A Regional History of the Railways of Great Britain: Volume 11 North and Mid Wales (1st ed.). Newton Abbot: David & Charles. ISBN 978-0-7153-7850-2. OCLC 6823219.
- Ferris, Tom (2004) [1961]. British Railways Volume 4 - Bewdley To Blaenau (DVD). demanddvd. DEMDVD084.
