= Capel Celyn Halt railway station =

Disused railway station in Gwynedd, Wales

Capel Celyn Halt

General information
- Location: Capel Celyn, near Bala, Gwynedd; Wales
- Coordinates: 52.9456°N 3.7031°W
- Grid reference: SH 856 400
- Platforms: 1

Other information
- Status: Disused

History
- Original company: Great Western Railway

Key dates
- 1 November 1882: Line opened
- 1 December 1930: Halt opened for passengers only
- 4 January 1960: Halt closed
- 28 January 1961: Line closed
Location

Capel Celyn Halt was a solely passenger railway station which served the rural area of Capel Celyn west of Bala. It was on the Great Western Railway's (GWR's) Bala Ffestiniog Line in Gwynedd, Wales.

== Origins ==
In 1882 the Bala and Ffestiniog Railway opened the line from Bala Junction to a temporary terminus at Festiniog, Trawsfynydd was one of the stations opened with the line; the future Capel Celyn Halt would be on this line, east of Trawsfynydd. At Festiniog passengers had to transfer to narrow gauge trains if they wished to continue northwards. To do this people travelling from Bala to Blaenau or beyond walked the few yards from the standard gauge train to the narrow gauge train much as they do today between the Conwy Valley Line and the Ffestiniog Railway at Blaenau Ffestiniog.

The following year the narrow gauge line was converted to standard gauge, but narrow gauge trains continued to run until 5 September 1883 using a third rail. Standard gauge trains first ran through from Bala to Blaenau Ffestiniog on 10 September 1883. The line was taken over by the Great Western Railway in 1910.

Capel Celyn Halt was one of the 198 opened by the Great Western Railway (GWR) between 1927 and 1939, spurred by rising competition with buses and, to a lesser degree, cars. The halt stood in a very thinly populated rural area with no obvious source of traffic; conversely, the people who did live, work and increasingly take leisure activities in the area had no other obvious means of transport.

== Description ==
The unstaffed halt was situated on the north side of the line on a horseshoe bend and next to an overbridge. The single curved platform edge was made of sleepers, the platform itself being infilled with ash and cinders. It was a mere 70 feet (21 m) long, so drivers had instructions to stop ensuring that the guard's compartment was alongside. The amenities provided were a platform shelter and two oil lamps, tended by Arenig station staff. The halt could be accessed via a footpath starting from the chapel in Capel Celyn, over a kilometre to the northwest.

== Services ==
The September 1959 timetable shows

- Northbound
  - three trains calling at all stations from Bala to Blaenau on Monday to Saturday
  - an extra evening train calling at all stations from Bala to Blaenau on Saturday
  - a Monday to Friday train calling at all stations from Bala to Trawsfynydd
- The journey time from Bala to Capel Celyn Halt was around 20 minutes.
- Southbound
  - three trains calling at all stations from Blaenau to Bala on Monday to Saturday
  - two extra trains calling at all stations from Blaenau to Bala on Saturday
  - an extra train calling at all stations from Blaenau to Trawsfynydd on Saturday evening
  - a Monday to Friday train calling at all stations from Blaenau to Bala, except Llafar, Bryn-celynog and Cwm Prysor Halts
- The journey time from Blaenau to Capel Celyn Halt was just over an hour, except for one Saturdays Only train which took longer because it sat at Trawsfynydd for 25 minutes.
- There was no Sunday service.

In 1935 the Ministry of Transport stated that the halt was used by 40 passengers per week.

After the Second World War at the latest most trains were composed of two carriages, with one regular turn comprising just one brake third coach. At least one train along the line regularly ran as a mixed train, with a second between Bala and Arenig. By that time such trains had become rare on Britain's railways. Workmen's trains had been a feature of the line from the outset; they were the Festiniog and Blaenau Railway's biggest source of revenue. Such a service between Trawsfynydd and Blaenau Ffestiniog survived to the line's closure to passengers in 1960. Up to 1930 at the earliest such services used dedicated, lower standard, coaches which used a specific siding at Blaenau where the men boarded from and alighted to the ballast.

== Closure ==
The halt closed in January 1960 but freight trains between Bala and Blaenau continued to pass the site for a further year, the last train of all passing on 27 January 1961. The track though the halt was lifted in the 1960s.

In 1964 the line reopened from Blaenau southwards to a siding near the site of Trawsfynydd Lake Halt where a large ("Goliath") gantry was erected to load and unload traffic for the then new Trawsfynydd nuclear power station. The main goods transported were nuclear fuel rods carried in nuclear flasks. The new facility was over twelve route miles north of Capel Celyn Halt, so the reopening brought no reprieve.

== Controversy ==
The site of the halt was nearly covered by Llyn Celyn reservoir, the construction of which led to the closure of the line in 1961 except the Bala to Bala Junction section. That section was subsequently closed in 1965. Building the reservoir was very controversial at the time and remains as a symbol in some minds to this day.

== Special trains ==
Rail enthusiasts' special trains traversed the line from time to time, notably the "last train" from Bala to Blaenau Ffestiniog and return on 22 January 1961.

== The station site in the 21st century ==
By 2014 there was little evidence of the halt. The platform no longer existed, however, one concrete lamp holder was still in place, and the waiting shelter had been moved on to a nearby farm. Although it was in a poor state, it was in use as a small storage shed. The trackbed was detectable both on satellite imagery and on the ground; including when it appears when the waters of Llyn Celyn fall in prolonged dry weather.

== The future ==
Since 2000 there have been at least two attempts to put the remaining line to use, but none of these come close to the site of the halt. As the line of route has been severed by Llyn Celyn the prospects of revival must be very remote.

Preceding station	Disused railways	Following station
Arenig; Line and station closed	Great Western Railway; Bala and Festiniog Railway	Tyddyn Bridge Halt; Line and station closed

== Further material ==
- Coleford, I. C. (November 2010). Smith, Martin (ed.). "By GWR to Blaenau Ffestiniog (Part Two)". Railway Bylines. 15 (12). Radstock: Irwell Press Limited.
- Ferris, Tom (2004) [1961]. British Railways Volume 4 - Bewdley To Blaenau (DVD). demanddvd. DEMDVD084.
- Turner, Alun (2003). Gwynedd's Lost Railways. Catrine: Stenlake Publishing. ISBN 978-1-84033-259-9.
- "Capel Celyn Halt". Model Railway Constructor. 33 (383). Shepperton: Ian Allan Publishing. March 1966.
