= Celyn =

Celyn may refer to these places in Gwynedd, Wales:

- Capel Celyn, an abandoned village near Bala (flooded 1965)
  - Capel Celyn Halt railway station (1882–1960)
- Llyn Celyn, the reservoir now on Capel Celyn
- Garth Celyn, a historic estate in Abergwyngregyn
