= Harlech Military Railway =

Coordinates: 52.873102°N 4.124364°W

Operation
- Locale: Harlech, Merionethshire, Wales
- Open: 1941
- Close: 1944 or 1946.
- Status: Demolished 1948
- Owner: Great Western Railway

Infrastructure
- Track gauge: Standard1,435 mm (4 ft 8 1/2 in)
- Propulsion system: Conventional steam

Statistics
- Route length: 1,320 yards (1,210 m)

The Harlech Military Railway was a military branch line in Merioneth, Wales. It ran roughly west-northwest from a junction with the Cambrian Coast Line north of Harlech, and had another branch running north from a reverse junction at the line's western end. The railway was built solely for military traffic during World War II. Contemporary published sources are reticent about the railway due to its military purpose.

The line was a standard gauge branch which veered seawards (westwards) off the ex-Cambrian Railways Cambrian Coast Line approximately 430 yards (390 m) north of Harlech railway station. This junction and a substantial section of the line can be seen in two aerial photographs of the period. The line appears on a 1948 Ordnance Survey map of the area.

The line's location north of the village is corroborated by Rail Map Online; however, the producers acknowledge that they are not confident that their map adequately represents the line's seaward end.

The line's primary purpose was to serve a gunnery range which was under the control of a camp at Bronaber, near Trawsfynydd. The line is not to be confused with the Harlech Tramway which was south of Harlech.
