= Arenig (disambiguation) =

Arenig can mean:

- The Arenig geological period
- Arenig Fawr, a mountain in Wales
- The Arenigs, mountains in Wales
- Arenig railway station in Wales: it closed down in 1960 and 1961
