= Harlech Tramway =

19th century tramway in Wales

Coordinates: 52.859698°N 4.116268°W

Operation
- Locale: Harlech, Gwynedd, Wales
- Open: 8 July 1878
- Close: about 1886
- Status: Closed

Infrastructure
- Propulsion system: Horse

Statistics
- Route length: 600 yards (550 m)
Overview
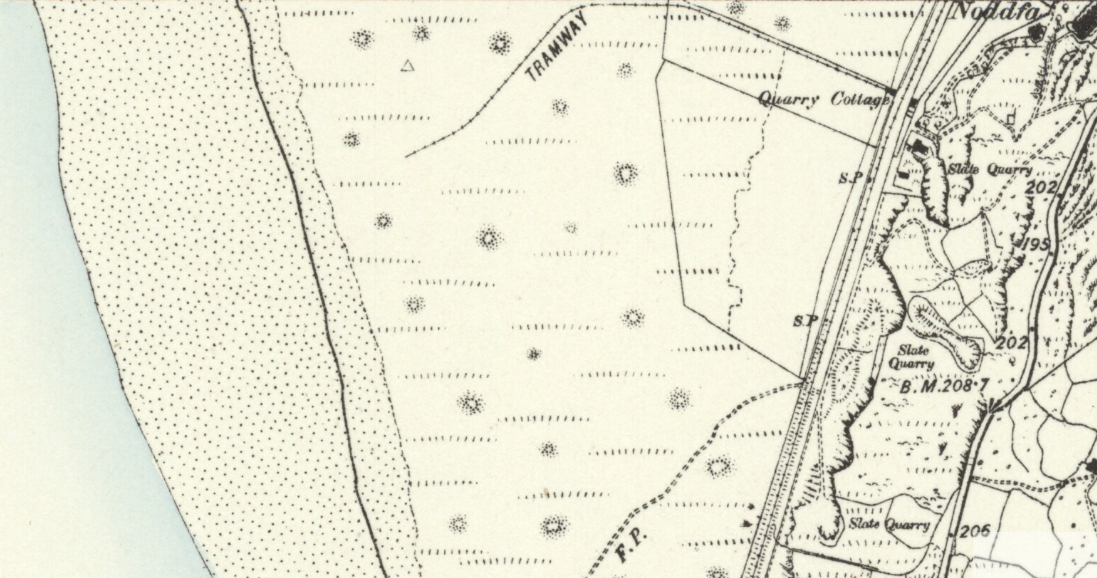

The Harlech Tramway was a horse drawn railway that ran from near the Cambrian Railways' Harlech station 600 yards (550 m) west to the beach from approx 1878 to 1886.

The tramway was developed by Mr Godfrey Morton of Tremadog (1810–1880). It was probably mainly used to facilitate beach loading of ships with slate from the Noddfa slate quarry, although tourist facilities in the Harlech area were being developed at this time, sponsored initially by Samuel Holland, the county's M.P.

Photographs and precise details of the line, its gauge and services have so far eluded historians, though it is shown on a 6" OS map. This map shows that the tramway started next to Quarry Cottage approximately 660 yards (600 m) south of Harlech station, running through what in 2016 was the Royal St. David's golf course. Boyd mentions the line and offers a map but in later correspondence acknowledges that his map was a misunderstanding.

The line's location south west of the village is corroborated by Rail Map Online, which shows it in the same place as the OS map, but it names the line "Harlech Quarry".

The line is not to be confused with the Second World War Harlech Military Railway which was north of Harlech.
