= Bala (New) railway station =

Disused railway station in Gwynedd, Wales

Bala
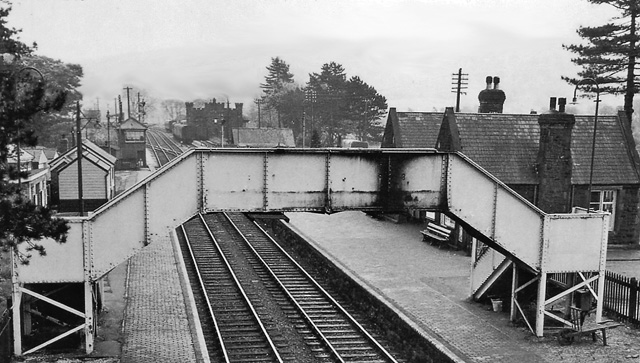
- Bala railway station in June 1962

General information
- Location: Bala, Gwynedd; Wales
- Coordinates: 52.9126°N 3.5942°W
- Grid reference: SH 928 362
- Platforms: 2

Other information
- Status: Disused

History
- Original company: Bala and Festiniog Railway
- Pre-grouping: Great Western Railway

Key dates
- 1 November 1882: Opened
- 18 January 1965: Closed
Location

Bala railway station was on the Great Western Railway's Bala Ffestiniog Line in Wales. It replaced the first Bala station which was further away from the town, on the Ruabon–Barmouth line.

The route to Blaenau was single track throughout. The stations at Bala, Arenig, Trawsfynydd and Festiniog had two platforms, each with its own track. This both allowed for potential traffic and provided passing loops. A fifth loop was provided between 1908 and 1950 immediately north of Cwm Prysor, when intermittent heavy military traffic to and from Trawsfynydd Camp was likely.

== Decline ==
The line northwards to Blaenau Ffestiniog closed to passengers on 2 January 1960 and to freight on 27 January 1961, following a "Last Train" special a week earlier. The short section to Bala Junction closed on 18 January 1965.

The goods shed was an unusual feature. Local landowner Mr. Price of Rhiwlas objected to the construction of the line, and to appease him the goods shed was built to resemble a castle, with mock battlements and turrets.*

There was a small engine shed - a sub-shed of Croes Newydd - to the south east of the station. It opened and closed with the line and was subsequently demolished.

== History ==
The station was opened by the Bala and Festiniog Railway, which was bought by the Great Western Railway in 1910. The station passed to the Western Region of British Railways on nationalisation in 1948. It was closed by the British Railways Board.

== The site today ==
The station was demolished and a fire station built on the site. The goods yard is now in light industrial use.

Preceding station	Disused railways	Following station
Frongoch; Line and station closed	Great Western Railway; Bala Ffestiniog Line	Bala Junction; Line and station closed

== Sources ==
- Bannister, Geoffrey F. (1987). Branch Line Byways Volume 2 Central Wales. Penryn, Cornwall: Atlantic Transport Publishers. ISBN 978-0-906899-26-7.
- Bannister, Geoffrey F. (1975). Great Western Steam off the Beaten Track. Truro: D. Bradford Barton. ISBN 978-0-85153-161-8.
- Boyd, James I.C. (October 1959). Mansell, K.G. (ed.). "Bala & Festiniog Section - W.R.". Railway World. 20 (233). London: Railway World Limited.
- Boyd, James I.C. (1988) [1972]. Narrow Gauge Railways in South Caernarvonshire – Volume 1. Headington: The Oakwood Press. ISBN 978-0-85361-365-7. OCLC 20417464.
- Butt, R. V. J. (October 1995). The Directory of Railway Stations: details every public and private passenger station, halt, platform and stopping place, past and present (1st ed.). Sparkford: Patrick Stephens Ltd. ISBN 978-1-85260-508-7. OCLC 60251199. OL 11956311M.
- Christiansen, Rex (1976). Forgotten Railways: North and Mid Wales. Newton Abbot: David and Charles. ISBN 978-0-7153-7059-9.
- Clemens, Jim (2003) [1959]. North Wales Steam Lines (DVD). The Jim Clemens Collection No.6. Uffington, Shropshire: B&R Video Productions. Vol 79.
- Griffiths, Roger; Smith, Paul (1999). The Directory of British Engine Sheds and Principal Locomotive Servicing Points: 1 Southern England, the Midlands, East Anglia and Wales. OPC Railprint. ISBN 978-0-86093-542-1. OCLC 59458015.
- Johnson, Peter (1995). North Wales (Celebration of Steam). Shepperton: Ian Allan Publishing. ISBN 978-0-7110-2378-9.
- Jowett, Alan (2000). Jowett's Nationalised Railway Atlas (1st ed.). Penryn, Cornwall: Atlantic Transport Publishers. ISBN 978-0-906899-99-1. OCLC 228266687.
- Mitchell, Vic; Smith, Keith (2010). Bala to Llandudno: Featuring Blaenau Ffestiniog. Midhurst: Middleton Press (MD). ISBN 978-1-906008-87-1.
- Quick, Michael (2009) [2001]. Railway passenger stations in Great Britain: a chronology (4th ed.). Oxford: Railway & Canal Historical Society. ISBN 978-0-901461-57-5. OCLC 612226077.
- Southern, D. W. (1995). Bala Junction to Blaenau Ffestiniog. Stockport: Foxline Publishing. ISBN 978-1-870119-34-4. Scenes from the Past, Railways of North Wales, No. 25.
- Turner, Alun (2003). Gwynedd's Lost Railways. Catrine: Stenlake Publishing. ISBN 978-1-84033-259-9.

== Further material ==
- Coleford, I. C. (October 2010). Smith, Martin (ed.). "By GWR to Blaenau Ffestiniog (Part One)". Railway Bylines. 15 (11). Radstock: Irwell Press Limited.
- Coleford, I. C. (November 2010). Smith, Martin (ed.). "By GWR to Blaenau Ffestiniog (Part Two)". Railway Bylines. 15 (12). Radstock: Irwell Press Limited.
- Cowlishaw, Brian (2001) [1961]. North Wales Branches (DVD). Ultimate Archive Steam. Uffington, Shropshire: B&R Video Productions. Vol 38.
- Ferris, Tom (2004) [1961]. British Railways Volume 4 - Bewdley To Blaenau (DVD). demanddvd. DEMDVD084.
