= Arenig railway station =

Disused railway station in Gwynedd, Wales

Arenig
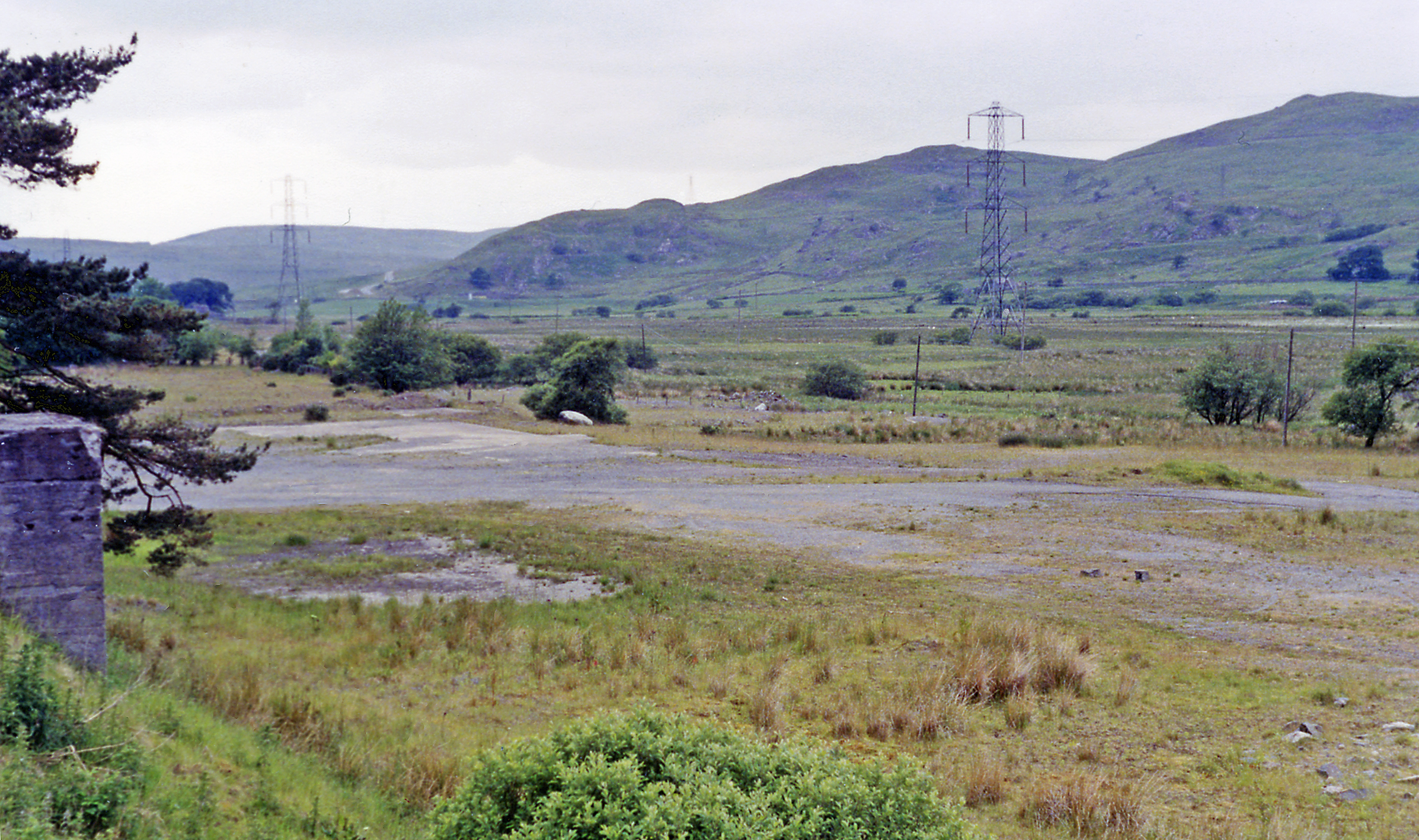
- Site of the station in 1992

General information
- Location: Arenig, west of Bala, Gwynedd; Wales
- Coordinates: 52.9382°N 3.7408°W
- Grid reference: SH 831 392
- Platforms: 2

Other information
- Status: Disused

History
- Original company: Bala and Festiniog Railway
- Pre-grouping: Great Western Railway

Key dates
- 1 November 1882: Opened
- 4 January 1960: Closed to passengers
- 28 January 1961: Closed completely
Location

Arenig railway station stood beneath Arenig Fawr on the Great Western Railway's Bala Ffestiniog Line in Gwynedd, Wales. It served this thinly populated upland area, but its particular purposes were to serve Arenig Granite quarry which opened in 1908 next to the station and to act as a passing loop on the largely single-track route. The railway was the quarry's main carrier and also its main customer, crushed stone being used for track ballast.

The station closed to passengers in January 1960 and freight a year later, with the last revenue earning train on 27 January 1961.

== Origins ==
In 1882 the Bala and Ffestiniog Railway opened the line from Bala Junction to a temporary terminus at Festiniog, Arenig was one of the stations opened with the line. At Festiniog passengers had to transfer to narrow gauge trains if they wished to continue northwards. To do this people travelling from Bala to Blaenau or beyond walked the few yards from the standard gauge train to the narrow gauge train much as they do today between the Conwy Valley Line and the Ffestiniog Railway at Blaenau Ffestiniog.

The following year the narrow gauge line was converted to standard gauge, but narrow gauge trains continued to run until 5 September 1883 using a third rail. Standard gauge trains first ran through from Bala to Blaenau Ffestiniog on 10 September 1883. The line was taken over by the Great Western Railway (GWR) in 1910.

The station remained part of the GWR through the Grouping of 1923, passing to the Western Region of British Railways on nationalisation in 1948. It was closed by the British Transport Commission, primarily because the line was to be flooded by damming east of Arenig. The station was staffed to the end.

== Description ==
There was a station building and signalbox on the Blaenau platform with a waiting shelter on the other. The station was a key watering point before the big slog "over the top" to Trawsfynydd and had a classic GWR water column for this purpose. The site was dominated by the quarry and its plant, which included a large stone crusher next to the station and a bridge bearing a conveyor belt which carried stone over the station to the crusher. The proximity of quarry and railway necessitated clear and precise arrangements for blasting, over which the railwayman in charge at the station had the ultimate veto.

The conveyor belt was installed around 1940 to replace a 2 feet (610 mm) narrow gauge railway which had carried stone from the quarries to the "main line".

== Passenger services ==
The September 1959 timetable shows

- Northbound
  - three trains calling at all stations from Bala to Blaenau on Monday to Saturday
  - an extra evening train calling at all stations from Bala to Blaenau on Saturday
  - a Monday to Friday train calling at all stations from Bala to Trawsfynydd
- The journey time from Bala to Arenig was around 25 minutes.
- Southbound
  - three trains calling at all stations from Blaenau to Bala on Monday to Saturday
  - two extra trains calling at all stations from Blaenau to Bala on Saturday
  - an extra train calling at all stations from Blaenau to Trawsfynydd on Saturday evening
  - a Monday to Friday train calling at all stations from Blaenau to Bala, except Llafar, Bryn-celynog and Cwm Prysor Halts
- The journey time from Blaenau to Arenig was just under an hour, except for one Saturdays Only train which took longer because it sat at Trawsfynydd for 25 minutes.
- There was no Sunday service.

After the Second World War at the latest most trains were composed of two carriages, with one regular turn comprising just one brake third coach. At least one train along the line regularly ran as a mixed train, with a second between Bala and Arenig. By that time such trains had become rare on Britain's railways. Workmen's trains had been a feature of the line from the outset; they were the Festiniog and Blaenau Railway's biggest source of revenue. Such a service between Trawsfynydd and Blaenau Ffestiniog survived to the line's closure to passengers in 1960. Up to 1930 at the earliest such services used dedicated, lower standard, coaches which used a specific siding at Blaenau where the men boarded from and alighted to the ballast.

Occasionally "double trains" ran, including at least one mixed double, composed of two locomotives, two coaches and several wagons.

== Closure ==
By the 1950s the line was deemed unremunerative. A survey undertaken in 1956 and 1957 found that the average daily numbers of passengers boarding and alighting were:

- Blaenau Ffestiniog Central 62 and 65
- Manod 7 and 4
- Teigl Halt 5 and 5
- Festiniog 28 and 26
- Maentwrog Road 8 and 6
- Trawsfynydd Lake Halt 1 and 1
- Trawsfynydd 28 and 24
- Llafar Halt 2 and 2
- Bryn-Celynog Halt 2 and 2
- Cwm Prysor Halt 3 and 3
- Arenig 5 and 5
- Capel Celyn Halt 7 and 8
- Tyddyn Bridge Halt 4 and 6
- Frongoch 18 and 15
- Bala 65 and 58

Military traffic had ended and, apart from a finite contract to bring cement to Blaenau in connection with the construction of Ffestiniog Power Station freight traffic was not heavy, most arriving and leaving Bala did so from and to the south and that to Blaenau could be handled from the Conwy Valley Line northwards.

In 1957 Parliament authorised Liverpool Corporation to flood a section of the line by damming the Afon Tryweryn. Monies were made available to divert the route round the dam, but it was decided that improving the road from Bala to Llan Ffestiniog would be of greater benefit. Road transport alternatives were established for groups such as schoolchildren and workers. The plans afoot for rail serving Trawsfynydd nuclear power station were to be catered for by building the long-discussed cross-town link between the two Blaenau standard gauge stations. The estimated financial savings to be made were £23,300 by withdrawing the passenger service and £7000 in renewal charges.

The station closed in January 1960 but freight services between Bala and Blaenau continued for a further year, the final train passing on 27 January 1961. The track though the station was lifted in the 1960s.

In 1964 the line reopened from Blaenau southwards to a siding near the site of Trawsfynydd Lake Halt where a large ("Goliath") gantry was erected to load and unload traffic for the then new Trawsfynydd nuclear power station. The main goods transported were nuclear fuel rods carried in nuclear flasks. The new facility was over ten route miles north of Arenig, so the reopening brought no reprieve.

== Special trains ==
Rail enthusiasts' special trains traversed the line from time to time, notably the "last train" from Bala to Blaenau Ffestiniog and return on 22 January 1961. This train took water at Arenig.

== The station and art ==
The mountainous countryside around Arenig was of particular interest to James Dickson Innes who introduced his friend Augustus John to the area. Innes painted several works which have been publicly displayed to some renown, such as "Arenig, North Wales". He and his friend are known to have used the railway as a means of getting to remote spots, as well as to arrive and depart for London and elsewhere.

== The station site in the 21st Century ==
The site was taken over by the adjacent quarry after closure. The platforms and station buildings survived in a derelict state until the early 1980s. Although by 2015 no trace of the platforms and buildings remained, the site could be identified by pillars which were used for supporting the conveyor belt which ran from the quarry over the station to the stone crusher. When the railway closed the quarry lost its key customer and road transport proved costly compared with the erstwhile railborne arrangements. One source writes that the quarry closed in the early 1960s. This in turn led to the village of Arenig losing its main source of employment so it also shrank; another source says it was still being worked by ARC in the 1980s. By 2016 it was definitely disused.

In 2015 the trackbed in both directions from the station was clearly defined both on satellite imagery and on the ground.

== The future ==
Between 2000 and 2011 there were at least two attempts to put the remaining line to use, but none of these aspired to come close to Arenig. As the line of route to the east has been severed by Llyn Celyn the prospects of revival must be very remote.

To considerable local surprise fresh moves to reopen the line from Blaenau as far south as Trawsfynydd began in September 2016, with the formation of The Trawsfynydd & Blaenau Ffestiniog Community Railway Company. On 21 September at least one regional newspaper reported that "Volunteers are set to start work this weekend on clearing vegetation from the trackbed between Blaenau Ffestiniog and Trawsfynydd." The company was quoted as saying "We have been given a licence by Network Rail to clear and survey the line."

Preceding station	Disused railways	Following station
Cwm Prysor Halt; Line and station closed	Great Western Railway; Bala and Festiniog Railway	Capel Celyn Halt; Line and station closed

== Further material ==
- Baughan, Peter E. (1980). A Regional History of the Railways of Great Britain: Volume 11 North and Mid Wales (1st ed.). Newton Abbot: David & Charles. ISBN 978-0-7153-7850-2. OCLC 6823219.
- Cowlishaw, Brian (2001) [1961]. North Wales Branches (DVD). Ultimate Archive Steam. Uffington, Shropshire: B&R Video Productions. Vol 38.
- Ferris, Tom (2004) [1961]. British Railways Volume 4 - Bewdley To Blaenau (DVD). demanddvd. DEMDVD084.
