= Frongoch quarry, Aberdyfi =

Disused slate quarry in Mid Wales

Frongoch
- Location in Gwynedd
- Location: near Pennal, Merioneth (now Gwynedd), Wales, UK; 52°33′26″N 3°58′19″W SN 66332 97359
- Products: Slate
- Type: Quarry
- Opened: pre-1865
- Closed: 1884

Frongoch slate quarry (also known as Fron-goch slate quarry or Fron-gôch slate quarry) was a slate quarry and mine in Mid Wales, approximately halfway between Aberdyfi (then Aberdovey) and Pennal (5 miles (8.0 km) away from each of them). The quarry was named after a nearby farm of the same name (the Fron-goch farm). 'Fron goch' is Welsh for 'Red breast'.

== History ==
=== Brett and Capper ===
The earliest mention of the quarry is in July 1865, when the quarry was owned by Messrs. Brett and Capper. David Davies, a worker at the quarry, was killed in a rock fall at the 'Frongoch Slate and Slab Quarry Works', on Thursday 20 July 1865. The slate slipped immediately above a group of workers, who raised the alarm and ran for the outside. However, whilst running, Davies was stuck by three falling rocks: the first one struck him in the leg, knocking him over and two more fell on his back and neck, his neck was severed killing him instantly. An inquest was held on the body, which returned a verdict of "Accidental death". His fellow workers escaped uninjured.

On 12 December 1866, the quarry's owners, Messrs. Brett and Capper, were granted sequestration by the Court of Chancery against Cambrian Railways. This was due to the work on the "Glandyfi diversion" section of the Cambrian Coast Line, which has a bridge over the former route to the Frongoch Harbour, from the quarry.

=== Frongoch Slate Quarry Co. ===
In April 1877, the Frongoch Slate Quarry Company Limited was formed, with the intent of buying and expanding the quarry. They had an authorised capital of £10,000 in £25 shares (equivalent to £3,023,763 in £2,520 shares, in 2025). The quarry and associated land was under a lease from Mr. James Hughes (the owner of the Frongoch Farm), expiring in 1910, for a nominal royalty; the Frongoch Harbour on the River Dovey (which the quarry used) was under a Crown lease for £2-per-annum (equivalent to £208-per-annum in 2025). The expected purchase price for the leases of the quarry and associated land was £6,000 (equivalent to £604,753 in 2025).

The company had purchased the quarry by 27 July 1877, and in March 1878 the company advertised for a new quarry manager, to superintend the working of the quarry, which was due to re-open soon afterwards. Mr. Lewis Roberts became the quarry manager; he remained in this post until the quarry's closure, when he became a worker at the nearby Bryn Eglwys quarry. The quarry was also managed by Edward Williams.

=== 1880–1884 ===
The quarry, harbour, tramway, and associated buildings were first advertised for sale, by private treaty, on 19 November 1880. However, no suitable offers were given, so these properties were auctioned separately on 24 March 1881, at 11:00am, by Mr. Owen Daniel. On 27 August 1886, at 3:00pm, the Frongoch Farm, on whose land the quarry lay on, was auctioned by Mr. Owen Daniel.

The buyers of the quarry are not clear. It carried on operating until the winter of 1883—1884, when it closed following a severe winter frost.

Some trials for copper were later made on the site.

== Description ==
The quarry consisted of one open pit, and three underground chambers.

== Transport ==
The quarry distributed its produce from the Frongoch harbour, on the north bank of the River Dyfi (also known as the River Dovey). It was connected to the harbour by the 400-yard-long (370 m) Frongoch quary tramway. This was steeply inclined to lower the slates, from the quarry – on the hillside – to the harbour. It crossed the A493 road by means of an underbridge, and crossed the Cambrian Coast Railway between Penhelig and Dovey Junction by means of an overbridge. The tramway had 8 wagon turntables, 7 slate wagons, and 4 wheeled trolleys, at the time of closure. The tramway was constructed from iron rails and iron sleepers.
