= Bronaber =

Coordinates: 52.869°N 3.914°W

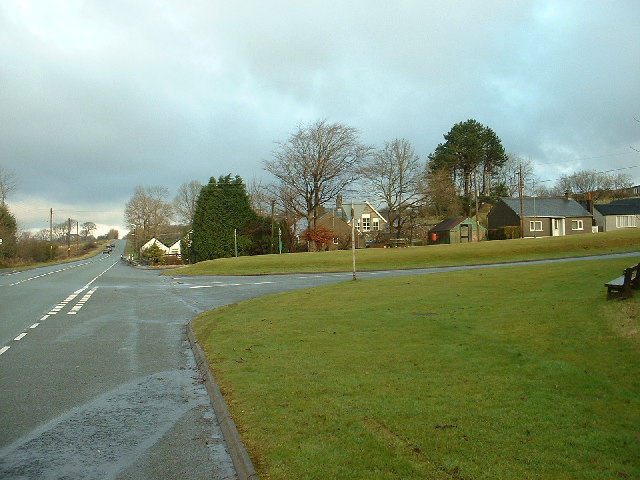
- Bronaber

- Location within Gwynedd
- OS grid reference: SH711319
- Community: Trawsfynydd
- Principal area: Gwynedd
- Country: Wales
- Sovereign state: United Kingdom
- Post town: BLAENAU FFESTINIOG
- Postcode district: LL41
- Dialling code: 01766
- Police: North Wales
- Fire: North Wales
- Ambulance: Welsh
- UK Parliament: Dwyfor Meirionnydd
- Senedd Cymru – Welsh Parliament: Dwyfor Meirionnydd

Bronaber is a village in Gwynedd, Wales, adjacent to the A470 north of Dolgellau and in Trawsfynydd community.

== General information ==
During the Second World War, the War Office used a site near Bronaber up in the Ranges for training exercises. There is a part of a river named after the training area called 'Llyn Soldiers' which means 'Soldiers Lake' Its continued use for training exercises following the war was the subject of protest by Plaid Cymru, which also challenged the UK government's continued military conscription in peace time. Other locations in Wales used for training exercises included Preseli Hills and Tregaron.

The village has a high proportion of Welsh language speakers (96.9%), and is accordingly in the top five Welsh communities in Gwynedd. (citation needed)

== Attractions ==
In Bronaber there is a holiday village used by tourists every year to stay in Snowdonia, there are approximately 200 lodges in Bronaber and most of them occupied every year until November. Also in Bronaber there is a shop, a bar, a chapel, a launderette, a letter box and a phone booth. There was a restaurant called the Rhiw Goch until recently when it was burnt down.

There is also a lake in Bronaber called Llyn Llygain which is also referred as Llyn Pikes, this is because there were pikes in the lake that people used to fish, but several believe that most of them have gone.
