= Frongoch =

Coordinates: 52.942°N 3.629°W

- The Calvinistic Methodist Cwmtirmynach Chapel

- Location within Gwynedd
- OS grid reference: SH905392
- Community: Llandderfel
- Principal area: Gwynedd
- Preserved county: Gwynedd
- Country: Wales
- Sovereign state: United Kingdom
- Post town: BALA
- Postcode district: LL23
- Dialling code: 01678
- Police: North Wales
- Fire: North Wales
- Ambulance: Welsh
- UK Parliament: Dwyfor Meirionnydd
- Senedd Cymru – Welsh Parliament: Gwynedd Maldwyn

Frongoch is a village located in Gwynedd, Wales. It lies close to the market town of Bala, on the A4212 road.

It was the home of the Frongoch internment camp, used to hold German prisoners-of-war during First World War, and then Irish Republican prisoners from the 1916 Rising.

== History ==
=== Whisky ===
By the late 1800s, Frongoch was the main centre for Welsh whisky production. The distillery was bought by Scottish whisky companies and closed in 1910.

=== Prison camp ===
The former distillery buildings (see above) were requisitioned by the UK government and used as a prisoner of war camp for German prisoners during World War One. After the 1916 Easter Rising in Ireland it was used to imprison 1800 of the Irish Volunteer Army rank and file. Among them were Michael Collins and Arthur Griffith.

== Railway station ==
Frongoch railway station was on the Bala Ffestiniog Line. It closed to passenger services on 2 January 1960 and freight services on 27 January 1961. The station building and signal box are now a private residence.

== Cwmtirmynach Chapel ==
The Welsh Calvinistic Methodist chapel at Cwmtirmynach, lies on the B4501, 1.3 miles (2.1 km) north of Fron-goch. It was built in 1826 and rebuilt in 1880 in what the RCAHMW describes as a "Lombardic/Italian style". The folk singer Robert Roberts (Bob Tai'r Felin) was precentor at the chapel for nearly 50 years. There is weekly worship and the current minister is Hywel Edwards.

== Education ==
There is a Welsh-medium primary school, Ysgol Bro Tryweryn, in the village. There were 58 pupils aged between 3 and 11 years on roll in 2017. As of January 2018, the school had the highest percentage of pupils (aged 5 and over) who spoke Welsh fluently at home in Wales, at 97.4%.
