= Trawsfynydd =

Village in Gwynedd, Wales

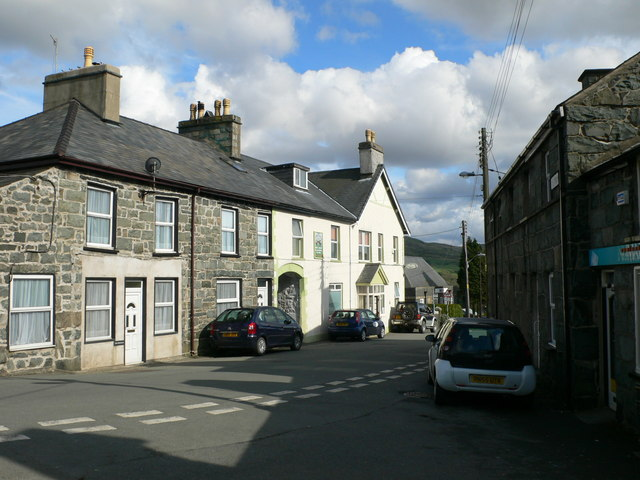
- Fronwynion Street, Trawsfynydd

- Location within Gwynedd
- Area: 120.10 km^{2} (46.37 sq mi)
- Population: 973 (2011)
  - Density: 8/km^{2} (21/sq mi)
- OS grid reference: SH707356
- Community: Trawsfynydd
- Principal area: Gwynedd
- Country: Wales
- Sovereign state: United Kingdom
- Post town: BLAENAU FFESTINIOG
- Postcode district: LL41
- Dialling code: 01766
- Police: North Wales
- Fire: North Wales
- Ambulance: Welsh
- UK Parliament: Dwyfor Meirionnydd
- Senedd Cymru – Welsh Parliament: Gwynedd Maldwyn
- List of places UK Wales Gwynedd 52.902°N 3.923°W Map of the community

Trawsfynydd (Welsh pronunciation: [trausˈvənɨ̞ð]; Welsh for 'across [the] mountain') is a linear village in Gwynedd, Wales, near Llyn Trawsfynydd reservoir, and adjacent to the A470 north of Bronaber and Dolgellau and 10 km (6 miles) south of Blaenau Ffestiniog. It also neighbours the towns of Porthmadog and Bala.

The total community area is 12,010 hectares (46.4 square miles) with a population of only 973. The area is sparsely populated with each hectare (acre) inhabited by an average 0.07 (0.03) persons. The community includes the sub-regions of Bronaber, Cwm Prysor and Abergeirw, in addition to the village itself.

Within the village, more than 81% population are fluent Welsh speakers; it is one of the top five Welsh-speaking communities in Gwynedd.

== History ==
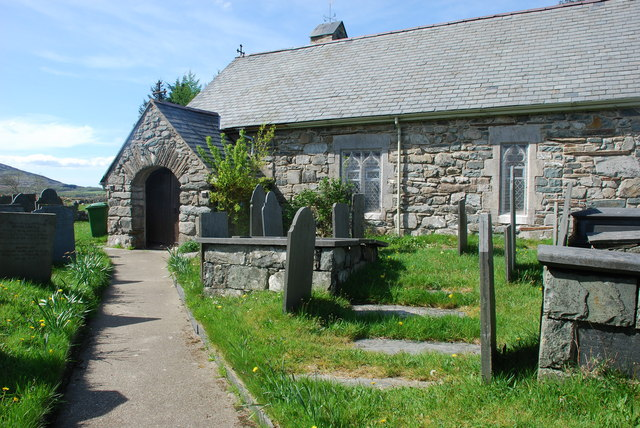
St Madryn's, Trawsfynydd Parish Church

Prehistoric people lived in the area in scattered groups of circular huts near the river, Afon Crawcwellt, about two miles south of today's village. A substantial Romano-British fort and settlement was established at Tomen y Mur in the first century CE. The area continued to be inhabited during sub Roman Britain. An example of activity is the Trawsfynydd tankard, a late Iron Age jug used to drink mead and beer between 100BC and 75AD.

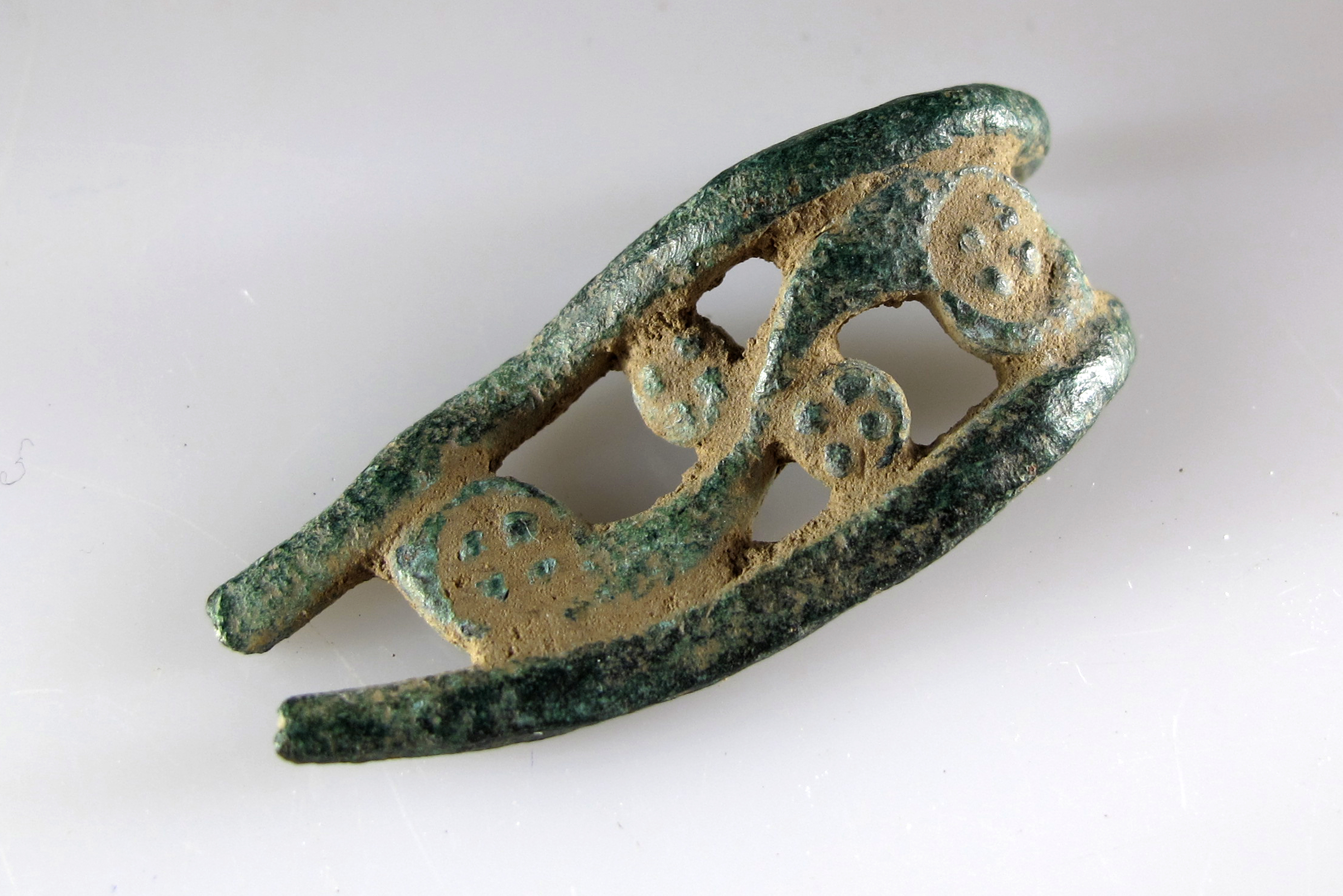
Tankard handle from 2000 years ago, pre Roman

By the early medieval period, the village was part of a large Celtic Christian parish of the three settlements of Trawsfynydd, Prysor, and Cefn Clawdd. Trawsfynydd parish church is dedicated to St Madryn. Although the medieval church was badly damaged by fire in 1978 (re-opened 1981), it remains the only listed building in the village.

Records in the Meirionnydd Lay Subsidy Rolls show that following the English conquest of Wales there were 105 taxpayers in the parish in 1292–3. Throughout the next centuries, agriculture and mineral extraction (such as quarrying) remained the main economic focus of the area.

In the late 16th century, the parish of Trawsfynydd was home to Saint John Roberts, one of the Forty Martyrs of England and Wales (he was canonised in 1970). Roberts, who was baptised in the church, gained great respect helping those with the plague in London. However, he was found guilty of high treason and hanged, drawn and quartered on 10 December 1610.

By the mid 17th century, the parish of Trawsfynydd had grown to roughly 300 houses and cottages with a population of 1200, although there were only 12 properties and a church in Trawsfynydd itself. Due to the economic hardship in the area, Trawsfynydd would remain quite small until the British Army established a training area near the village in 1930. Between 1924 and 1928, a large man-made reservoir named Llyn Trawsfynydd was created to supply water for Maentwrog hydro-electric power station. This would lead to the largest change to the village, when a location nearby was chosen as a site for one of the UK's first nuclear power stations in the 1950s.

=== Military training area ===
Before the Second World War, the War Office opened a site at Bronaber near Trawsfynydd as an artillery range and training area. Its continued use for training exercises after the war was the subject of protest by Plaid Cymru, who also challenged the UK government's continued military conscription in peacetime.

=== Trawsfynydd nuclear power stations ===
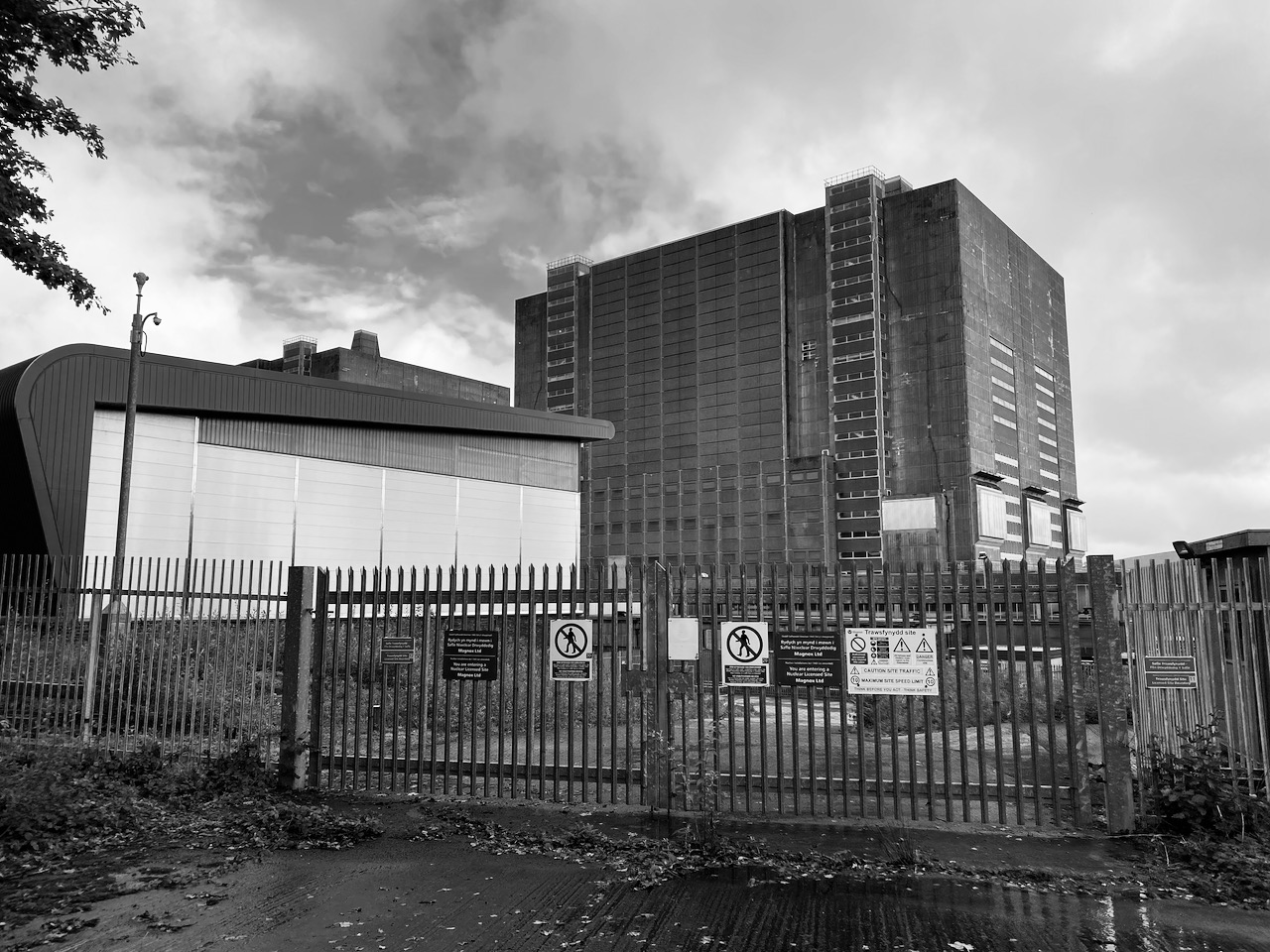
Trawsfynydd Nuclear Power Station from the rear of the facility.

In 1965 the new power station was completed. It was capable of supplying the whole of North Wales' electricity needs. The lake was subsequently also used to supply cooling water to the twin reactor Trawsfynydd nuclear power station, which was used for the commercial generation of electricity for the UK national grid. It also became the biggest employer in the area which brought financial wealth to the village.

One of the four original dams built to create the lake was subsequently rebuilt after construction of the nuclear power plant. Whereas previously the Maentwrog power station had access to all of the water in the lake, the needs of the nuclear plant dictated that from then on, the hydro plant should only use the top five feet of water.

In the 1990s the site was closed. Decommissioning is expected to take until 2083.

== Governance ==
An electoral ward in the same name exists. This ward includes the community of Maentwrog and Gellilydan and has a total population of 1,604.

== Transport ==
=== Railways ===
Trawsfynydd used to be served by a section of the Great Western Railway branch line, which ran from Bala to Blaenau Ffestiniog. To the north of the station, the army built its own station to serve the large camp nearby.(camp detail) Today Trawsfynydd railway station is a private home. (pictures). The line closed to all traffic in 1961, and the trackbed at the Bala end was subsequently severed by the Llyn Celyn reservoir, but the section between Blaenau and Trawsfynydd Power Station reopened in 1964 for nuclear flask traffic. Access from the Bala end being no longer possible, a new section of track – the so-called "Trawsfynydd Link" – was constructed to link the previously separate ex-GWR and ex-LNWR stations in Blaenau Ffestiniog. It finally closed in 1998, although the track remains in situ.

=== Road ===
In the late 18th and early 19th centuries a turnpike was built that ran through the village. With the advent of motor transport, this became the A470 in the 1920s. Between 1963 and 1965, a bypass was built around the village for through traffic.

== In popular culture ==
In 1976 the Children's Film Foundation production One Hour to Zero was filmed in the village and at the nearby power station. The film First Knight (1995) had scenes filmed around Llyn Trawsfynydd.

== Notable people ==
=== Hedd Wyn ===
Trawsfynydd was the home of the Welsh poet Hedd Wyn (1887–1917), who died during the Battle of Passchendaele in 1917, six weeks before his poem won the Bard's Chair at that year's National Eisteddfod. The Chair was sent to his parents in the village draped in a black cloth. Y Gadair Ddu (The Black Chair) is now on display at his home farm Yr Ysgwrn. A statue of him by Leonard Stanford Merrifield, unveiled in 1924, stands in the main street of Trawsfynydd. Hedd Wyn is buried with others from his regiment, the Royal Welch Fusiliers, at Artillery Wood Cemetery, Boezinge in Flanders. The film Hedd Wyn (1992) was filmed in and around Trawsfynydd.

=== Others ===
- Margaret Davies (ca.1700 – ca.1778), poet and poetry collector, was born near Trawsfynydd.
- Maurice Jones (1863–1957), bardic name Meurig Prysor, a priest and university educator.
- Humphrey Lloyd (1610–1689), Bishop of Bangor from 1674 until 1689.
- Morgan Lloyd (1822–1893), Liberal politician and MP, was born in the parish of Trawsfynydd.
- Dewi Prysor, novelist and poet, was raised in the parish of Trawsfynydd.
- Iwan Roberts (born 1967), actor, lyricist and singer, was raised in the village.
- St. John Roberts (1577–1610), a Benedictine monk and priest; martyred at Tyburn.
- John Rowlands (1938–2015), novelist and academic, was born in the parish of Trawsfynydd.
- Elfed Wyn Jones (born ca.1998), originates from Hafodwen farm and known for his week-long hunger strike for broadcasting devolution in Wales. Elfed was also one of the six youngsters who repainted the Cofiwch Dryweryn mural in Llanrhystud, Ceredigion after it was defaced with an “Elvis” graffiti in early February, 2019.
- Mared Griffiths (born 2007), footballer for Manchester United, was born in the village. At 17 she made her debut for the Red Devils scoring twice against Wolverhampton Wanderers in the Women's FA Cup. In February 2025, Griffiths made her international debut for Wales against Italy.
