= Bala Junction railway station =

Disused railway station in Gwynedd, Wales

Bala Junction
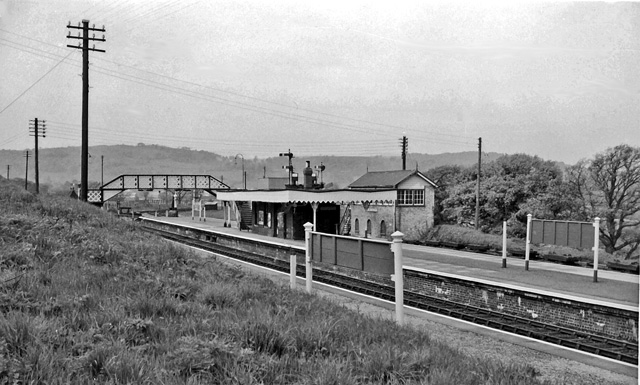
- Bala Junction station in 1962

General information
- Location: Bala, Gwynedd; Wales
- Coordinates: 52.90640°N 3.58150°W
- Grid reference: SH 937 355
- Platforms: 3

Other information
- Status: Disused

History
- Pre-grouping: Great Western Railway

Key dates
- 1 November 1882: Opened
- 18 January 1965: Closed to passengers
Location

Bala Junction railway station was on the Ruabon to Barmouth line in southern Gwynedd, Wales. It closed to passengers on Monday 18 January 1965. Bala Junction was unusual in that it was inaccessible by road and merely served as an interchange station; it was located about ¾ mile to the south-east of the town of Bala.

The station was at the junction with the Blaenau Ffestiniog branch. It was built as a crossing point for trains on the Bala Ffestiniog and Ruabon Barmouth lines, and featured three platforms with a small waiting room and signalbox on a central island platform. There was also a cast-iron GWR water tank.

== History ==
Opened by the Great Western Railway, it remained in that company through the Grouping of 1923. The station passed to the Western Region of British Railways on nationalisation in 1948. Passenger services to Bala and on the Ruabon-Barmouth line ceased in January 1965, the service beyond Bala to Blaenau Festiniog having been withdrawn in 1960.

During its operational life, Bala Junction served as an interchange station for the branch line train to Blaenau Festiniog, usually operated by small tank locomotives such as the 6400 Class 0-6-0PT and 5800 Class 0-4-2T tank locomotives. These trains did not run beyond Bala Junction, instead returning north to the GWR station at Blaenau Festiniog. There were no goods facilities here either; all goods trains stopped to shunt detached wagons for the branch line train.

As a junction station, Bala Junction was equipped with standard GWR lower quadrant semaphore signals to control train movements between the Bala Ffestiniog and Ruabon-Barmouth lines. These were used particularly when the branch line train was shunting in preparation for its return to Blaenau Festiniog as there were no turning facilities here. To run around, the branch line engine had to cross from Platform 3 (the Bala Ffestiniog platform) onto the main line and run back along Platform 2, used by eastbound trains running to Ruabon.

As of 2024, the only remnants at Bala Junction are the trackbeds of the Bala Ffestiniog and Ruabon-Barmouth lines and the platform faces. The site is close to a nearby dam; part of the access road for this uses the formation of the Bala Ffestiniog line, passing close to the remains of a short bridge that carried the line into Bala Junction itself.

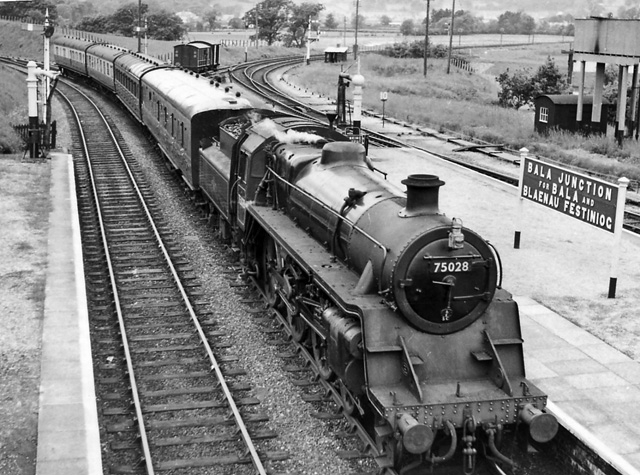
BR Standard 4MT 75028 arrives at Bala Junction with the 12.45 Pwllheli-Chester.

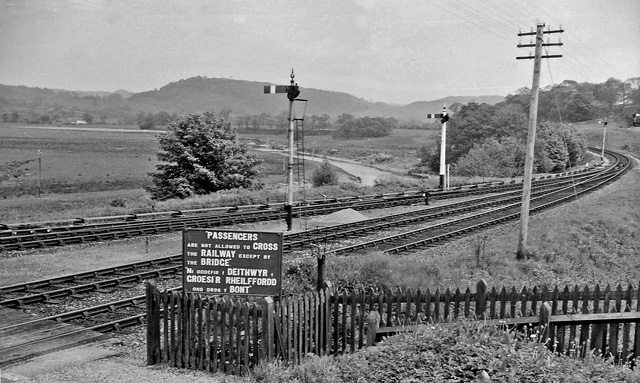
View NE from the station along the Ruabon Barmouth Line.

== Neighbouring stations ==
Preceding station	Disused railways	Following station
Llandderfel; Line and station closed	Great Western Railway; Ruabon Barmouth Line	Bala Lake Halt; Line and station closed
Bala; Line and station closed	Great Western Railway; Bala Ffestiniog Line	Terminus

== Sources ==
- Baughan, Peter E. (1980). A Regional History of the Railways of Great Britain: Volume 11 North and Mid Wales (1st ed.). Newton Abbot: David & Charles. ISBN 0-7153-7850-3. OCLC 6823219.
- Boyd, James I.C. (1988) [1972]. Narrow Gauge Railways in South Caernarvonshire – Volume 1. Headington: The Oakwood Press. ISBN 978-0-85361-365-7. OCLC 20417464.
- Butt, R. V. J. (October 1995). The Directory of Railway Stations: details every public and private passenger station, halt, platform and stopping place, past and present (1st ed.). Sparkford: Patrick Stephens Ltd. ISBN 978-1-85260-508-7. OCLC 60251199. OL 11956311M.
- Clemens, Jim (2003) [1959]. North Wales Steam Lines (DVD). The Jim Clemens Collection No.6. Uffington, Shropshire: B&R Video Productions. Vol 79.
- Jowett, Alan (2000). Jowett's Nationalised Railway Atlas (1st ed.). Penryn, Cornwall: Atlantic Transport Publishers. ISBN 978-0-906899-99-1. OCLC 228266687.
- Mitchell, Vic; Smith, Keith (2010). Bala to Llandudno: Featuring Blaenau Ffestiniog. Midhurst, West Sussex: Middleton Press (MD). ISBN 978-1-906008-87-1.
- Quick, Michael (2009) [2001]. Railway passenger stations in Great Britain: a chronology (4th ed.). Oxford: Railway & Canal Historical Society. ISBN 978-0-901461-57-5. OCLC 612226077.
- Southern, D. W. (1995). Bala Junction to Blaenau Ffestiniog (Scenes from the Past, Railways of North Wales, No. 25). Stockport: Foxline Publishing. ISBN 1-8701-19-34-7.
- Turner, Alun (2003). Gwynedd's Lost Railways. Catrine, Ayrshire: Stenlake Publishing. ISBN 9781840332599.
