= List of stations and halts on the Ffestiniog Railway =

By law, each new railway is required to mark off the distances along its line from a given point. The Ffestiniog Railway has changed that point three times in its existence. Originally the "Zero Point", as it is called was set near to the Dinas station at the north end of the line (at a location called Rhiwbryfdir, now buried under the slate tips).

The second "Zero Point" saw the line turn around and was located at the southern end of the line, on the quayside, at the Welsh Slate Cos. yard, some quarter-mile further on from Porthmadog Harbour railway station.

Following the revival of the line, and at a later date, the "Zero Point" was resited at the water tower at Porthmadog Harbour railway station.

The "accurate" measurement of the line has varied as the line has evolved over the years, not only from the changes above, but with the construction of the Deviation, and other realignments.

The Ffestiniog Railway route, 2006

Station	Place	Image	Opened	Closed	Distance from Porthmadog	Notes
Porthmadog Harbour	Porthmadog		1865	Open	0	Junction with the original line from across the Britannia bridge to Welsh Slate Co. wharf. Junction with the Welsh Highland Railway 1923-1936 and from 2011.
Pen Cob Halt	Boston Lodge	Aerial view of Boston Lodge	1956	1967	70 chains (1.41 km)	Opened 19 May 1956 used regularly only until 5 November 1957.
Boston Lodge Halt	Boston Lodge		1928	Open	1 mile 5 chains (1.71 km)	Temporary terminus 23 July 1955 to end of 1955 season. Used as required mainly by staff.
Minffordd	Minffordd (near Portmeirion)		1872	Open	2 miles 5 chains (3.32 km)	Joint station with the Cambrian Line. Temporary FR terminus 19 May 1956 to end of 1956 season.
Cae Ednyfed	Minffordd (near Portmeirion)		1836	1863	2 miles 7 chains (3.36 km)?	There were stables here between 1836 and 1863 and this was a horse stage station.
Pen y Bryn Halt	Penrhyndeudraeth		1957	1957	2 miles 63 chains (4.49 km)	Opened 20 April 1957 used regularly only until 5 November 1957.
Penrhyn	Penrhyndeudraeth		1865	Open	3 miles 8 chains (4.99 km)	Temporary terminus 20 April 1957 to 5 November 1957.
Rhiw Goch (Passing Loop)	Penrhyndeudraeth		1836	Open	4 miles 16 chains (6.76 km)	Passing loop for horse-drawn trains until 1863. Re-instated in 1975.
Plas (private) Station	Tan-y-Bwlch		1865	c. 1920	6 miles 2 chains (9.70 km)	Used only by the Oakeley household at Plas Tan y Bwlch.
Plas Halt	Tan-y-Bwlch		1963	Open	6 miles 19 chains (10.04 km)	Opened 31 May 1963.
Hafod y Llyn	Tan-y-Bwlch		1836	1873	Approx. 7 miles 5 chains (11.37 km)	Used for passing slate trains until 1865 and as passenger station 1865 to 1873.
Tan-y-Bwlch	Tan-y-Bwlch		1873	Open	7 miles 35 chains (11.97 km)	Temporary terminus 5 April 1958 to 5 April 1968.
Coed y Bleiddiau	Coed y Bleiddiau		1865?	Open	Approx. 8 miles 40 chains (13.68 km)	Private platform serving Coed y Bleiddiau cottage which is only accessible by rail or footpath.
Campbell's Platform	Y Dduallt		1965(private) 1968 (full use)	Open	9 miles 7 chains (14.62 km)	Private halt serving Plas y Dduallt, a 15th-century Welsh Manor House. Built in 1965 for works trains during reconstruction of the line. Line re-opened to the public in 1968.
Dduallt	Moel Dduallt		1880?	Open	9 miles 44 chains (15.37 km)	Temporary terminus 6 April 1968 to 24 June 1977.
Tunnel South loop	Moelwyn Mawr		1842	c1865	Approx. 10 miles (16.09 km) (on former track alignment)	Used for passing horse drawn trains and early steam trains.
Moelwyn Halt	Moelwyn Mawr		1920s?	1939	10 miles 60 chains (17.30 km) (on former track alignment)	At the northern end of the old Moelwyn tunnel.
Gelliwiog	Moel Dduallt		1975	1977	10 miles 32 chains (16.74 km)	Temporary terminus of push-pull shuttle trains from Dduallt 26 May 1975 to 24 June 1977.
Llyn Ystradau	Tanygrisiau reservoir		1977	1978	Approx. 11 miles 30 chains (18.31 km)	Temporary terminus 25 June 1977 to 23 June 1978.
Tanygrisiau	Tanygrisiau		1866	Open	12 miles 10 chains (19.51 km)	Temporary terminus 24 June 1978 to 24 May 1982. Now used as a passing place.
Dinas	Blaenau Ffestiniog		1865	1870	13 miles 30 chains (21.52 km) (on branch from current line)	The original northern terminus, opened 6 January 1865. From the opening of Duffws in 1866 until the closure of Dinas in 1870, alternate trains ran along the Dinas and Duffws branches.
Blaenau Festiniog Junction/Stesion Fein	Blaenau Ffestiniog		1881	1939	13 miles 25 chains (21.42 km)	‘Stesion Fein’ (narrow station).Interchange station with LNWR (Conwy Valley Line). Terminus from 31 May 1931 until 1939.
Blaenau Festiniog (GWR)	Blaenau Ffestiniog		1883	1939	13 miles 50 chains (21.93 km)	Interchange station with GWR line to Bala
Blaenau Ffestiniog	Blaenau Ffestiniog		1982	Open	13 miles 50 chains (21.93 km)	Current terminus; joint station with British Rail (Conwy Valley Line) opened 25 May 1982; roughly on site of Blaenau Ffestiniog (GWR) station.
Duffws	Blaenau Ffestiniog		1866	1931	13 miles 60 chains (22.13 km) (on a different alignment)	Only alternate trains ran to Duffws until 1870 when Dinas was closed to passengers. Terminus until 1931.

== See also ==
- Conwy Valley Line
- British narrow gauge railways
- Slate industry in Wales
