= Rhyd =

Rhyd may refer to:

- Rhyd, Ceredigion, Wales
- Rhyd, Gwynedd, Wales
