= St Twrog's Church =

St Twrog's Church may refer to:

- St Twrog's Church, Bodwrog
- St Twrog's Church, Maentwrog
