= Llyn Mair =

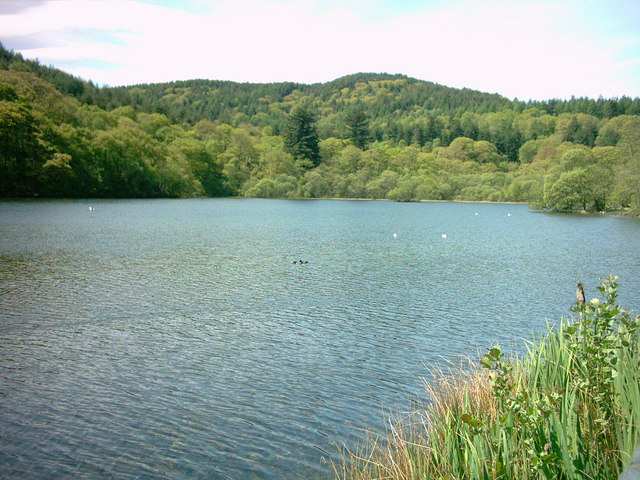
- Looking towards Coed Llyn Y Garnedd

- Location within Gwynedd
- Location: North Wales
- Coordinates: 52.951°N 4.004°W
- Type: artificial lake
- Basin countries: United Kingdom
- Surface area: 14 acres (5.7 ha)

Llyn Mair (Welsh for 'Mary's lake') is a 14-acre (5.7 ha) artificial lake near Maentwrog, in Gwynedd in North Wales (grid reference SH652412). It lies in the area of Tan-y-Bwlch, a little above Plas Tan-y-Bwlch, and is in the catchment area of the River Dwyryd. It was created by William Edward Oakeley (of Plas Tan-y-bwlch) as a 21st birthday present for his daughter Mair and as a water supply. It was built in 1889, and the nearby smaller Llyn Hafod-y-Llyn dates from the same period.

Plas Tan y Bwlch is thought to be the first house in North Wales with electric lighting powered from its own hydro-electric station, which was commissioned in the 1890s. A pipeline from the lake fed water to a Pelton wheel, which was located in a small power house on the hillside immediately behind the house. It ceased to operate soon after 1928, when the public hydro-electric power station at Maentwrog began supplying the area. In June 2013 a new hydro-scheme, costing £420,000, and similarly tapping the water from Llyn Mair, was opened. The water falls 60m to the turbine, and the scheme is expected to meet most of the Plas' electricity needs.

The lake is set alongside the B4410 road, a minor road linking the hamlet of Rhyd. The position of the lake bordered with ancient oak woods and its tranquil appearance makes this a popular picnic site for visitors, and it is also a starting point for a number of local country walks. There is some limited parking available just off the road.

The narrow gauge Ffestiniog Railway runs through the woods above the lake, and Tan-y-Bwlch railway station can be reached on foot from the lake.

The lake also has a notable echo because of the shape of the surrounding hills.

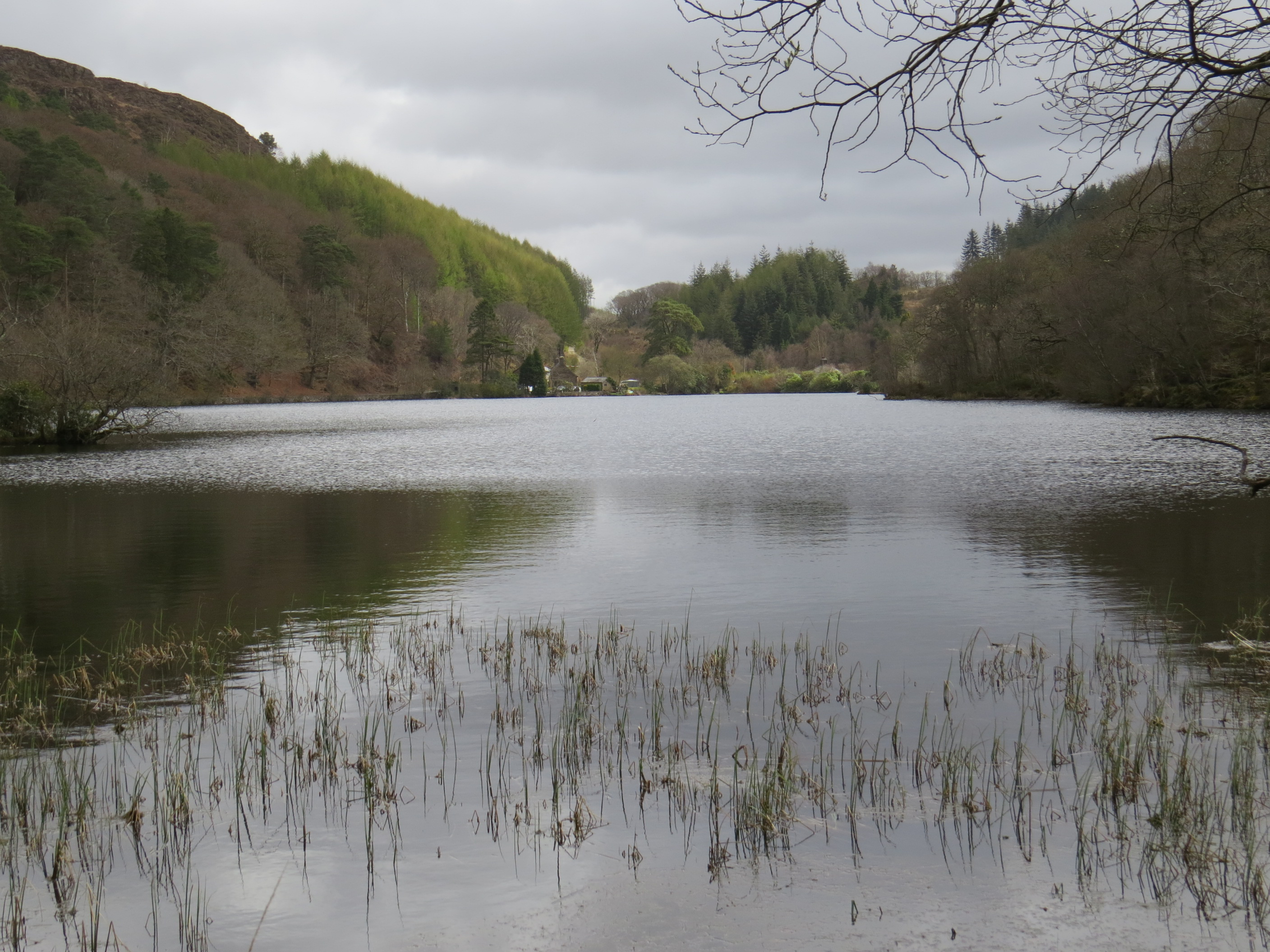
Llyn Mair looking towards the east
