= Oakeley Arms Hotel =

Hotel in Gwynedd, Wales

Coordinates: 52°56′57″N 3°59′43″W

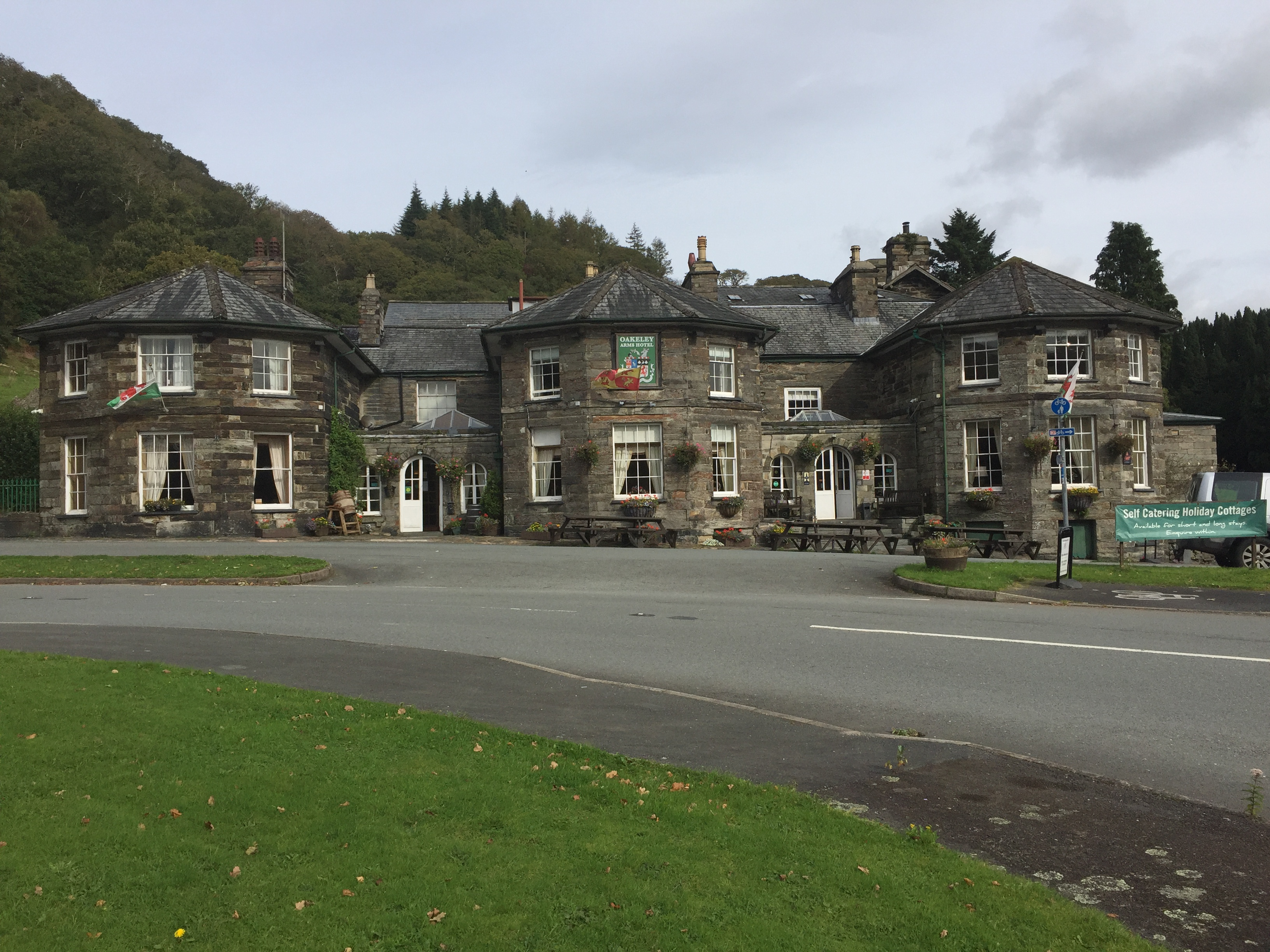
Front view of the Oakeley Arms Hotel in Maentwrog.

The Oakeley Arms Hotel is a Grade II listed hotel near Maentwrog in North Wales. The original building dates back to the 17th century, and was once part of the nearby Tan-y-Bwlch Estate. Although its principal use has been as an inn, historically it has also been used as a post office, makeshift court house, polling station and police station.

== History ==
The Oakeley Arms Hotel was originally known as the Tan y Bwlch Inn, because it belonged to the nearby Tan y Bwlch Estate. Some local records claim that the hotel was built on the original site of the estate’s manor house (now located ¼ mile west and called Plas Tan-y-Bwlch).

The inn was first built in the 1600s but was extended during the 1700s when it was owned by a local drover. In his 1778 book A Tour in Wales, it was described by writer and traveller Thomas Pennant as “a very neat small inn, for the reception of travellers who ought to think themselves much indebted to a nobleman, for the great improvement it received from his munificence ”.

Sometime during the early 1840s the inn was renamed as the Oakeley Arms, in honour of the family who owned the Tan-y-Bwlch estate. The Oakeley family were one of the richest families in the area, their wealth having come from the slate mines of nearby Blaenau Ffestiniog.

In 1910 the Oakeley Arms Hotel was auctioned off from the estate and was bought privately. It was given a Grade II listing in 1954 because of its historical importance “as a fine example of an estate-built inn (one of several associated with the major estates of north Wales) and strong architectural character consistent with this patronage, not least in the quality of the masonry”.

In the nineteenth century, the Oakeley Arms was given its own crest. It means “I am cautious but I do not fear”.

In 1940 the hotel was host to the Cottesmore School from Hove, Sussex, evacuated from the south coast of England. The school later moved to a former workhouse in Cors-y-Gedol Hall, near Barmouth, until the end of the war.

Today, the hotel is privately owned and has recently undergone a programme of renovation.
