= A496 road =

Road in Wales

A496

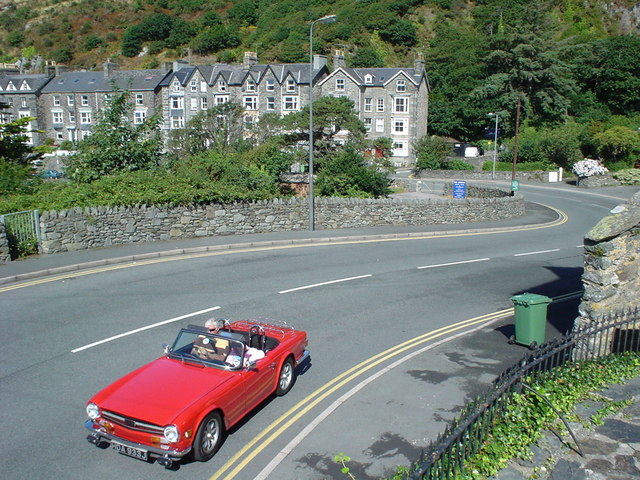
- The A496 at Barmouth

Route information
- Length: 32.8 mi (52.8 km)

Major junctions
- North end: Blaenau Ffestiniog; 52.9956°N 3.9420°W
- A470 A487
- South end: Llanelltyd; 52.7570°N 3.9044°W

Location
- Country: United Kingdom
- Constituent country: Wales

Road network
- Roads in the United Kingdom; Motorways; A and B road zones

The A496 is a major coastal and mountainous road in southern Snowdonia.

The road is 32.8 miles in length, from Blaenau Ffestiniog to Llanelltyd, via Harlech. The original northern terminus of the road before A470 re-numbering was Llandudno. The road passes through a diverse landscape, including the mountainous region of Blaenau Ffestiniog, two estuaries, and the Cambrian Coast.

== Description ==
The northernmost point of the road is the A470 (Church Road) junction at Blaenau Ffestiniog. The road by-passes Glanypwll, Rhiwbryfdir and Tanygrisiau before descending towards the Vale of Ffestiniog along the course of Afon Goedol. The road passes through the village of Maentwrog, before crossing Afon Prysor near the Ceunant Llennyrch National Nature Reserve.

The road follows the southern banks of the River Dwyryd, before reaching the Cardigan Bay coast at Talsarnau. The road runs alongside the Cambrian Line railway for much of the coast route, bypassing Harlech before ascending inland via the villages of Llanbedr, Llanfair and Dyffryn Ardudwy. The road returns to the coast at Llanaber, before the semi-urban stretch through the seaside town of Barmouth.

After passing the Barmouth Bridge, the road returns inland, along the northern banks of the Mawddach estuary, via Farchynys and Bontddu. Nearing the road's southern terminus, the road passes the Penmaenpool Bridge junction before reaching Llanelltyd, north of Dolgellau.

== Landmarks ==
Along the road is St Twrog's Church, Maentwrog, a church noted for its stone, which in legend was reputedly thrown by a giant to kill Pryderi. He is said to lie underneath it.
