= Duffws railway station (Festiniog Railway) =

Former railway station in Wales

Duffws (FR)
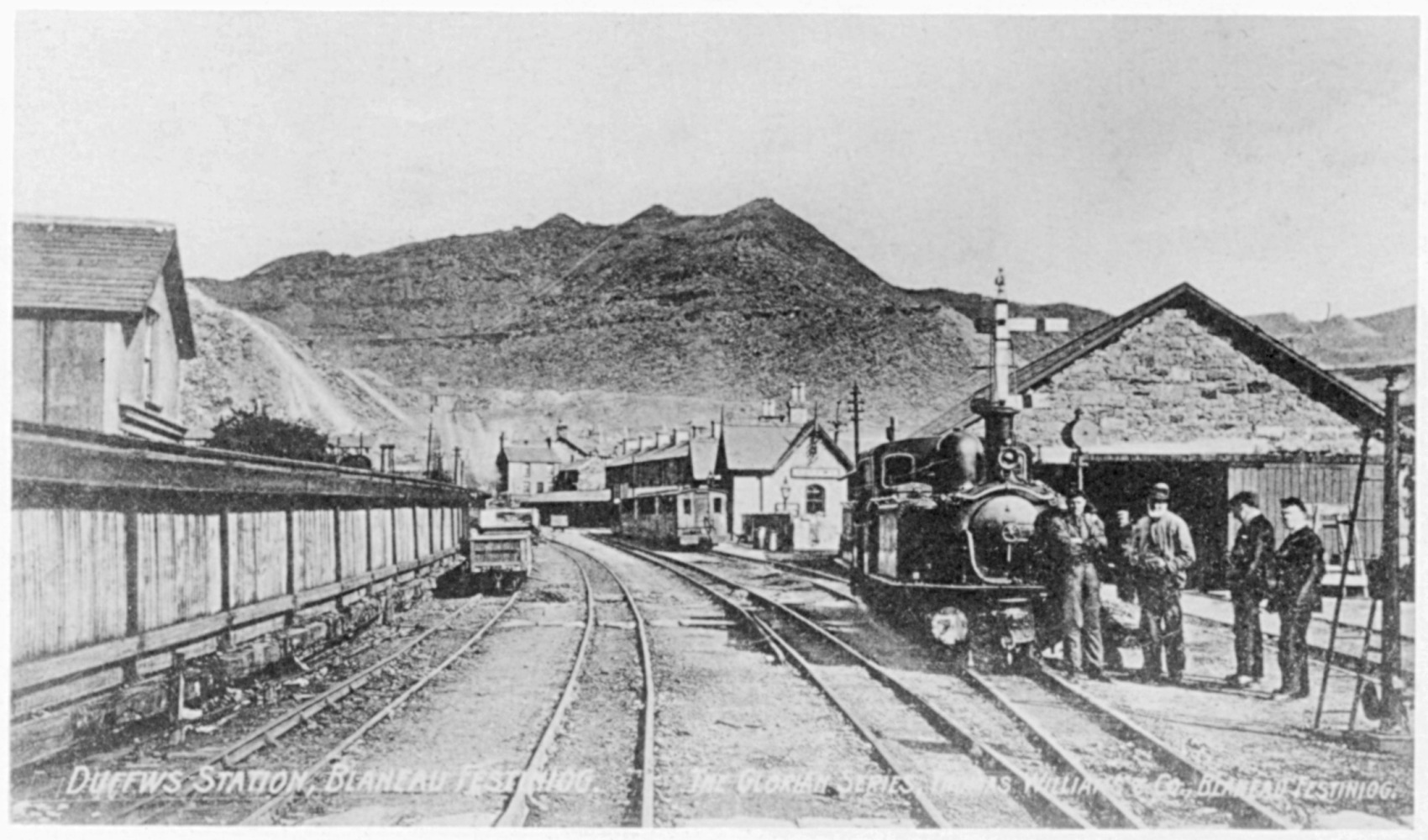
- Duffws (FR) station, believed to be around 1900

General information
- Location: Blaenau Ffestiniog, Gwynedd; Wales
- Coordinates: 52.9949°N 3.9348°W
- Grid reference: SH 702 459
- Platforms: 1

Other information
- Status: Disused

History
- Original company: Festiniog Railway

Key dates
- January 1866: Opened
- 1 January 1923: Closed
- 1 January 1925: Reopened
- 1 June 1931: Closed
Location

Duffws was the Festiniog Railway's (FR) second passenger station in Blaenau Ffestiniog, then in Merionethshire, now in Gwynedd, Wales. This station is not to be confused with the Festiniog and Blaenau Railway's (F&BR) Duffws (F&BR) station which stood some distance away on the opposite side of Church Street. During that station's life from 1868 to 1883 passengers travelling from (say) Festiniog on the F&BR to Tan-y-Bwlch on the Festiniog would walk between the two stations, much as passengers walk between the standard gauge and narrow gauge in modern-day Blaenau Ffestiniog.

== Context ==
The evolution of Blaenau's passenger stations was complex, with five different railway companies providing services to the area.

== Station name ==
Several sources comment on the name "Duffws", which is not a Welsh word but a corruption. What it is a corruption of is unclear, with some sources saying it comes from "Diffwys" (meaning 'steep slope or mountainside') - the pronunciation of both words is similar - others saying it is related to "Diphwys" and most making no comment. The station first appeared in Bradshaw on opening in January 1866 as "Diffwys", being changed to "Duffws" from 1867. Tickets largely used "Duffws", though an example bearing "Diphwys" is recorded.

== History ==
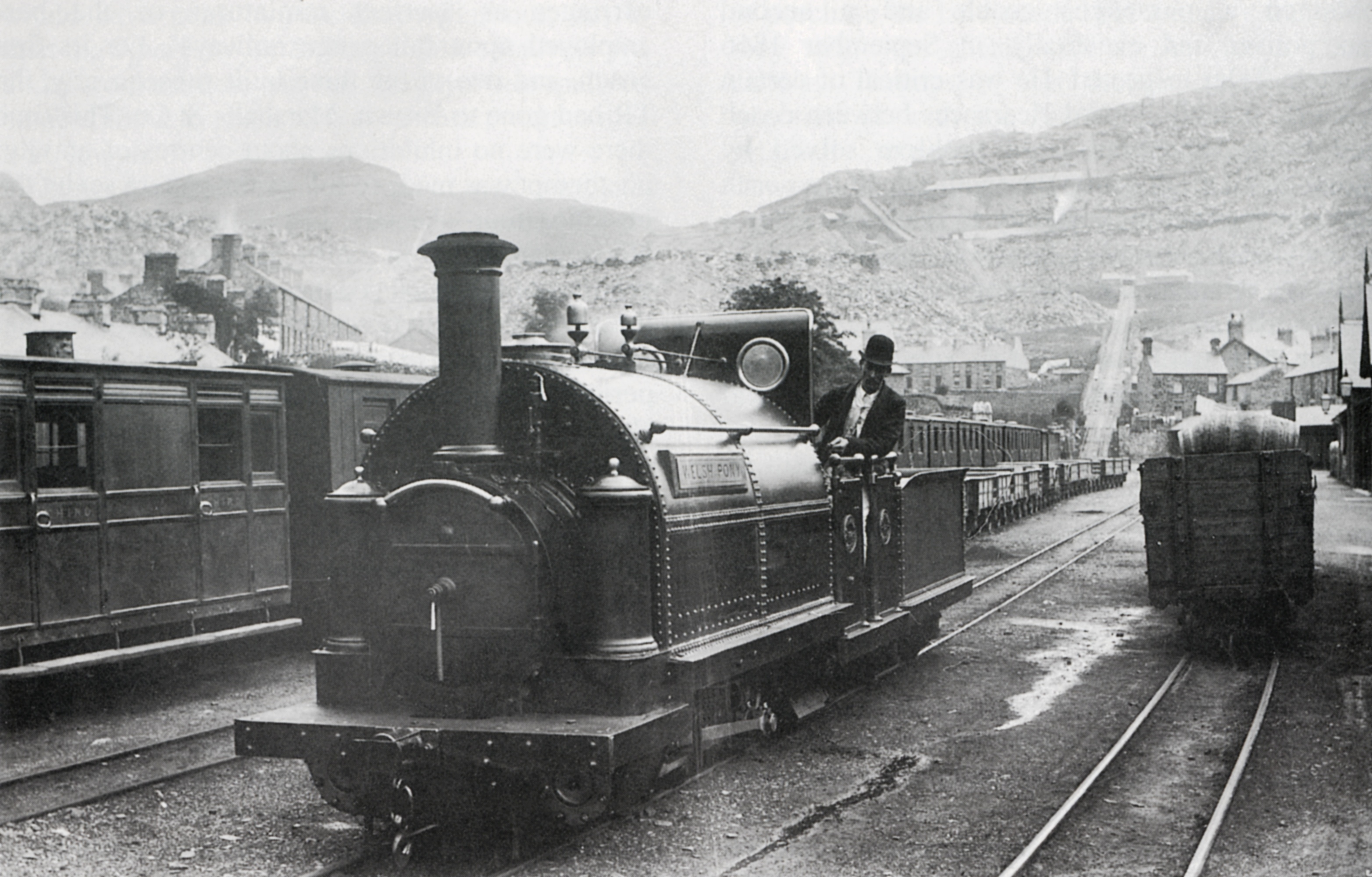
Ffestiniog Railway engine "Welsh Pony" at Duffws (FR) station, 1886

The station opened in January 1866 for passengers to Portmadoc and points between. It joined the first steam-hauled passenger service in Britain to use tracks of less than standard gauge, with the line carrying a quarter of a million people in its first year of operation.

The previous year the FR had opened Dinas (FR) station further from the centre of the town. Trains from Portmadoc alternated between the two stations, but Duffws was better sited for passenger traffic, so Dinas closed to passengers in 1870.

== Station layout ==
The site and its buildings changed over the years. The initial station was built almost at a right angle to the running lines, with its tracks forming a very short branch adjacent to the north side of Church Street. In 1877 a new station building was erected northeast of the original, aligned with the running lines. Changes were made to tracks in later years, but the station building remains today.

Both stations' platform was almost nominal, as the carriages were very low to the ground no height was needed. There were two running lines through the station: the "Passenger Line" which ran past the platform, with the other for goods and workmen's trains. The other two lines visible on photographs were a run-round loop for passenger locomotives and a siding.

== Closure ==
The station closed throughout 1923–4, then closed for good in 1931, the last train having called the previous Autumn. The service was cut back to terminate at the joint GWR/FR station. Slate traffic continued past the station building.

The FR closed progressively, the final axe falling in 1946, though quarries continued to use the line through the station to get ever-diminishing quantities of product to the exchange sidings at the LMS station. The station itself was eventually fenced off and its surrounds landscaped to become a car park. This process continued until 1962 with the eventual removal of all lines through the Duffws site when the quarries either closed or switched to using lorries to take slates to customers.

== Present day ==
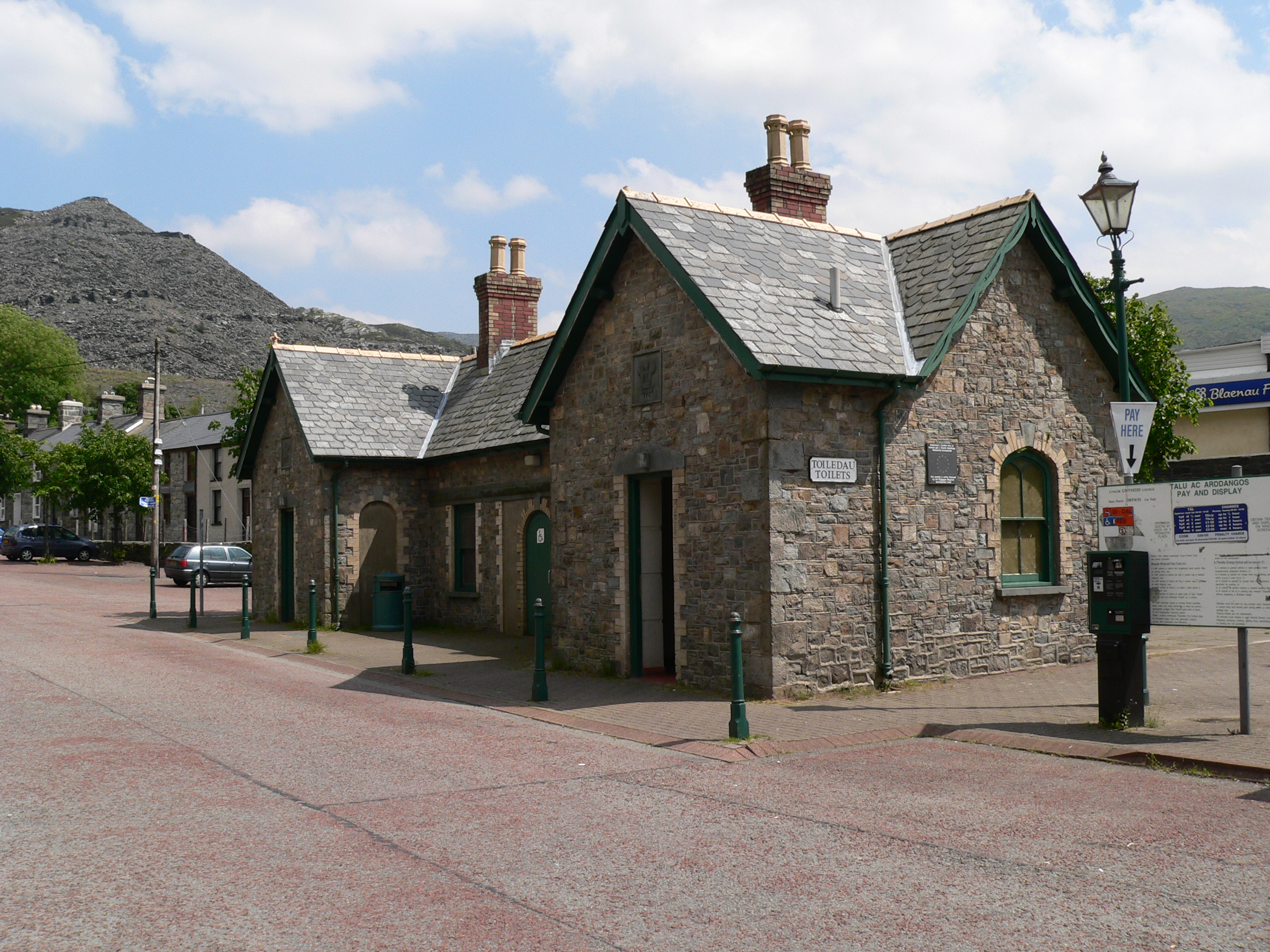
The preserved station building

Today, the station is in use for public toilets and is also a listed building.

Preceding station	Heritage railways	Following station
Tanygrisiau towards Porthmadog Harbour	Ffestiniog Railway 1866–1881	Terminus
Blaenau Festiniog Junction (Stesion Fain) towards Porthmadog Harbour	Ffestiniog Railway 1881–1883	Terminus
Blaenau Ffestiniog Central towards Porthmadog Harbour	Ffestiniog Railway 1883–1931	Terminus

== Other material ==
- Butter, Roland (April 2003). Smith, Martin (ed.). "The Festiniog in Light Railway Days". Railway Bylines. 8 (5). Radstock: Irwell Press Limited.
