= St Trygarn's Church, Llandrygarn =

Coordinates: 53°17′19″N 4°25′40″W

St Trygarn's Church
- Church of St Trygarn
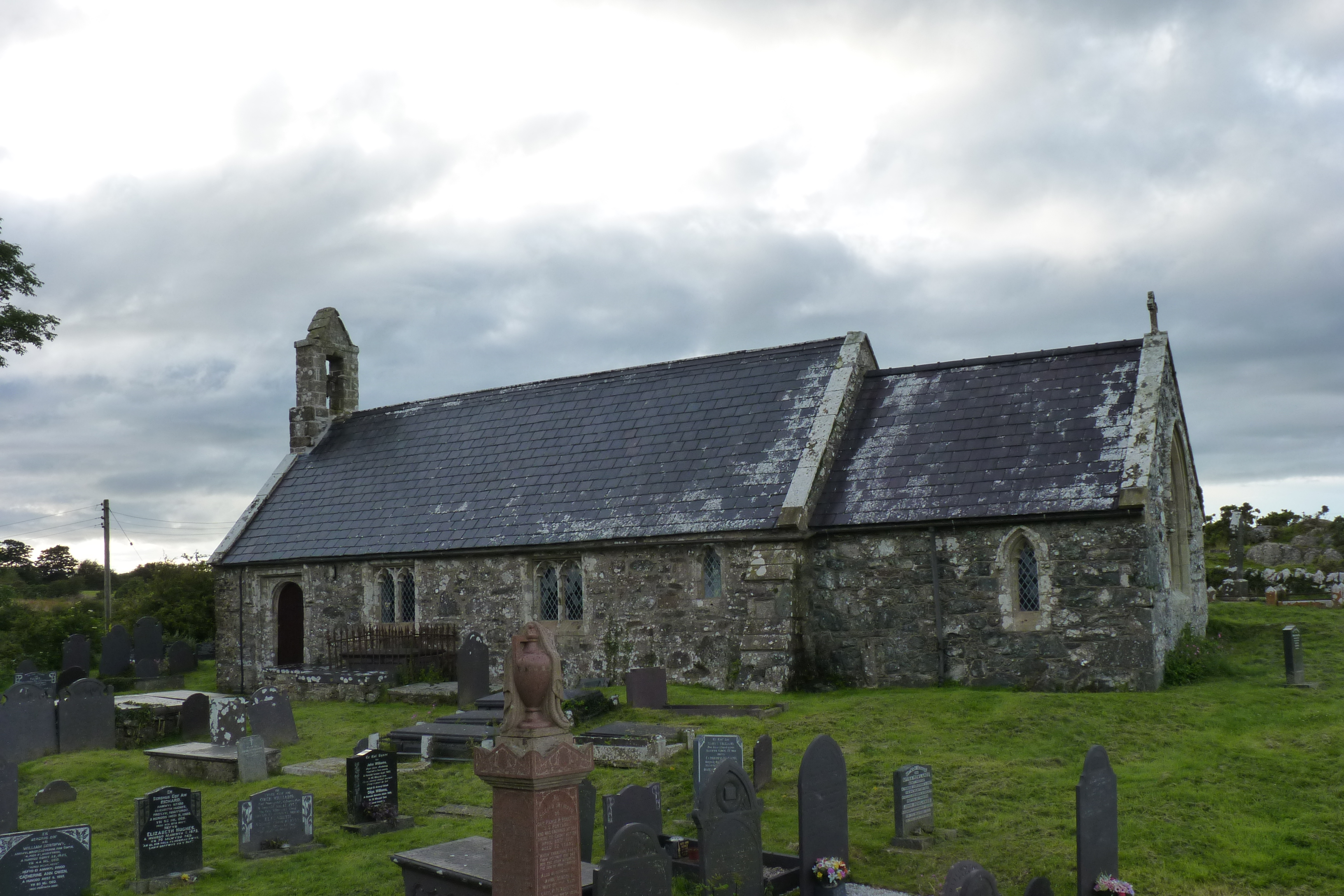
- St Trygarn's Church
- Denomination: Church in Wales
- Previous denomination: Roman Catholic; Church of England

History
- Status: active

Architecture
- Years built: 13th century

Administration
- Diocese: Diocese of Bangor
- Parish: Bro Cyngar

St Trygarn's Church is a Church in Wales parish church in the Diocese of Bangor which covers its location at Llandrygarn, Anglesey, Wales. It was built in the 13th century and is a Grade II listed building. The church is the sole monument in Llandrygarn.

== History ==
St Trygarn's Church is thought to have been built in the 13th century; the former north doorway of the nave, which was reset in the south wall of the chancel, is the only part of the church which dates from that time. The collar beam roof of the chancel and the window settings were put into the church in the Late Medieval period. There are two 18th-century memorials: one in slate to Owen and Elen Morris and three of their descendants, and one in marble to Ellin and John Hughes and two members of their family. Both are set on the internal south wall of the nave.

In the 19th century, new windows were installed and the majority of the interior was refitted. Samuel Lewis noted in 1849 that St Trygarn's Church and St Twrog's Church, Bodwrog, shared a priest, who resided in a house in Bodwrog built in 1838 by Jesus College, Oxford, to whom belonged the tithes of the parish. The church was described in Archaeologia Cambrensis as a small, single-aisled church with dimensions of 40 feet (12 m) by 14 feet 6 inches (4.42 m). The church continues to serve the parish and provide services bilingually in English and Welsh.

== Listing ==
The church was granted Grade II-listed status in 1971 as "a rural Medieval church of the simple traditional type, characteristic of Anglesey."
