= Campbell's Platform railway station =

Railway station in Gwynedd, Wales

Campbell's Platform
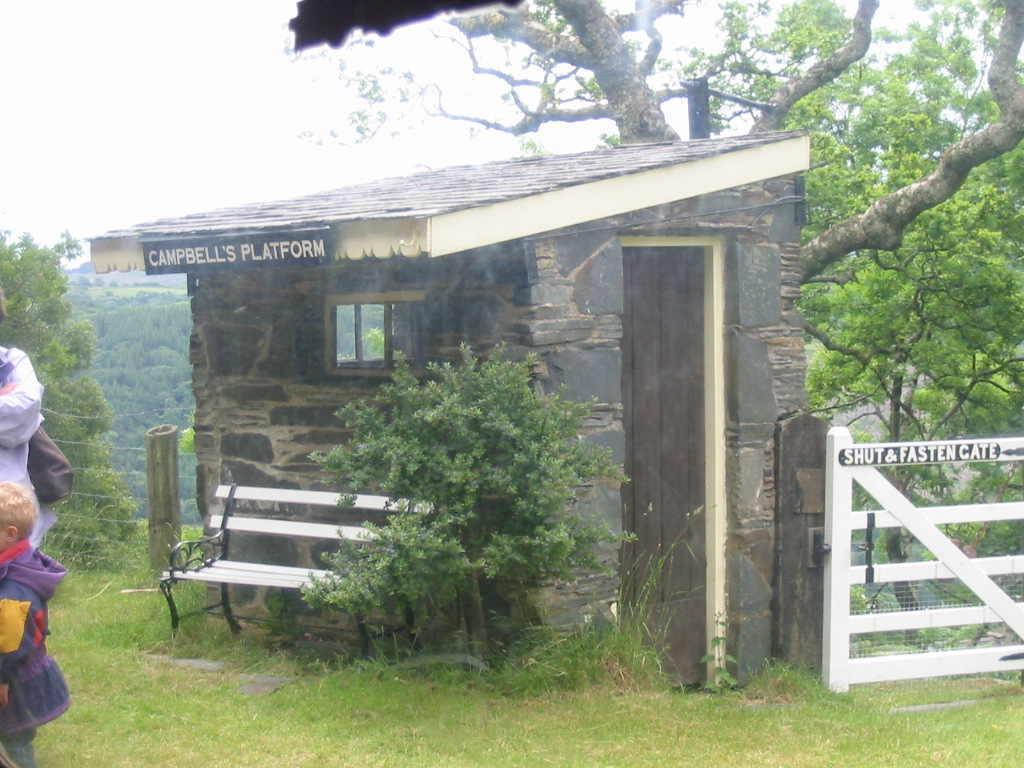

General information
- Location: Tan-y-Bwlch, Gwynedd; Wales
- Coordinates: 52.95746°N 3.97587°W
- Grid reference: SH673418
- System: Station on heritage railway
- Owner: Festiniog Railway Company
- Manager: Ffestiniog Railway
- Platforms: 1

Key dates
- April 1965: Opened for use by Col Campbell on line under restoration
- 6 April 1968: Opened as a private halt on the reopened line to Dduallt
Location

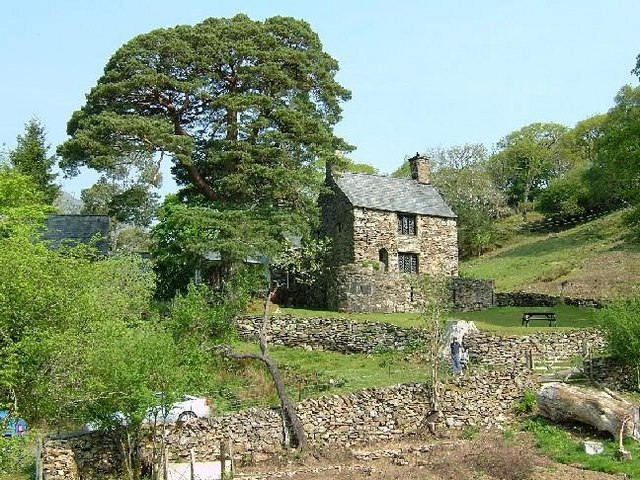
Plas y Dduallt

Campbell's Platform (grid reference SH673418) is a private, unstaffed halt on the Welsh narrow gauge Ffestiniog Railway. The railway was built in 1836 to carry dressed slate from Blaenau Ffestiniog to Porthmadog for export by sea. It is 9 miles and 7 chains from Porthmadog and is at 510 feet above sea level.

== History ==
The halt was established in 1965 to serve Plas-Y-Dduallt, a small Welsh Manor House (just below the railway) dating in part from the 15th century, and where Oliver Cromwell is said to have stayed during his campaign against the Royalists of North Wales.

Colonel Andrew Campbell bought the house in 1962 and undertook a complete restoration. Road access to Plas Dduallt is recent and during the 1960s the Colonel kept his own locomotive on a siding by the halt. He ran his own train to and from Tan-y-Bwlch under running powers granted by the Ffestiniog Railway.

The colonel allowed the use of his outhouses for hostel accommodation for volunteers. He was a licensed explosives handler and as a volunteer he did much of the rock blasting required on the spiral section of the deviation and beyond. A slate seat has been erected at Dduallt in his memory.

Campbell's Platform (named in his honour) is a private halt available for use only by residents and visitors staying at Plas Dduallt. Intending passengers must check with the Ffestiniog Railway Company before embarking on their journey.

Plas Dduallt was on Most Haunted in its 2008 series for paranormal investigations.

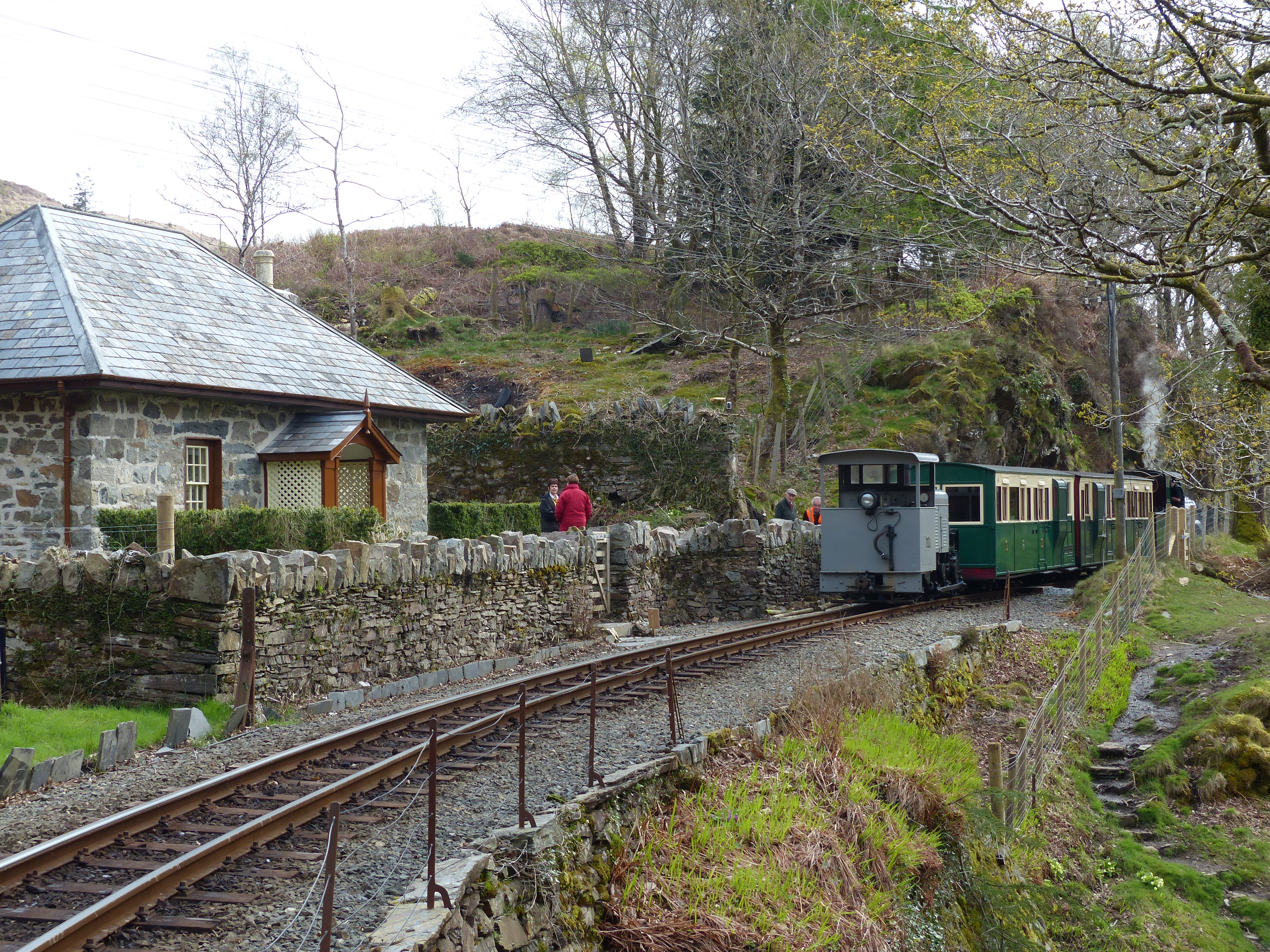
Coed-y-Bleiddiau

Between Campbell's platform and Tan-y-Bwlch is Coed-y-Bleiddiau cottage, a private residence that was built c1860 for the Ffestiniog Railway's Inspector of the Line. The cottage is over half a mile by steep footpath from the nearest road, and in the 1930s it was used as a holiday home by several families, including those of Granville Bantock the composer and Kim Philby the Russian spy. This cottage also has its own private railway platform, which displays a name board. The location features on the map in the Traveller's Guide, but not on the company web. Coed-y-Bleiddiau has recently been restored by the Landmark Trust, and is now used for self-catering holiday lets.

== Services ==
Preceding station	Heritage railways	Following station
Tan-y-Bwlch towards Porthmadog Harbour	Ffestiniog Railway	Dduallt towards Blaenau Ffestiniog

== Bibliography ==
- Brian Hollingsworth: Ffestiniog Adventure - The Festiniog Railway's Deviation Project.
- Ffestiniog Railway Company: Traveller's Guide.
- Mitchell, Vic; Smith, Keith (1995). Porthmadog to Blaenau. West Sussex: Middleton Press. figs. 71-73. ISBN 9781873793503. OCLC 877269886.
