= Rhyd, Ceredigion =

Village in Ceredigion, Wales

Coordinates: 52.056309°N 4.552213°W

Rhyd
- Location within Ceredigion
- OS grid reference: SN 2507 4288
  - Cardiff: 71.1 mi (114.4 km)
  - London: 192.9 mi (310.4 km)
- Community: Beulah
- Principal area: Ceredigion
- Country: Wales
- Sovereign state: United Kingdom
- Post town: Newcastle Emlyn
- Postcode district: SA38
- Police: Dyfed-Powys
- Fire: Mid and West Wales
- Ambulance: Welsh
- UK Parliament: Ceredigion Preseli
- Senedd Cymru – Welsh Parliament: Ceredigion

Rhyd is a hamlet in the community of Beulah, Ceredigion, Wales, which is 71.1 miles (114.4 km) from Cardiff and 192.9 miles (310.4 km) from London. Rhyd is represented in the Senedd by Elin Jones (Plaid Cymru) and is part of the Ceredigion Preseli constituency in the House of Commons.

== See also ==
- Rhyd, Gwynedd
- List of localities in Wales by population
