= Plas Halt railway station =

Unstaffed halt in Wales

Plas Halt
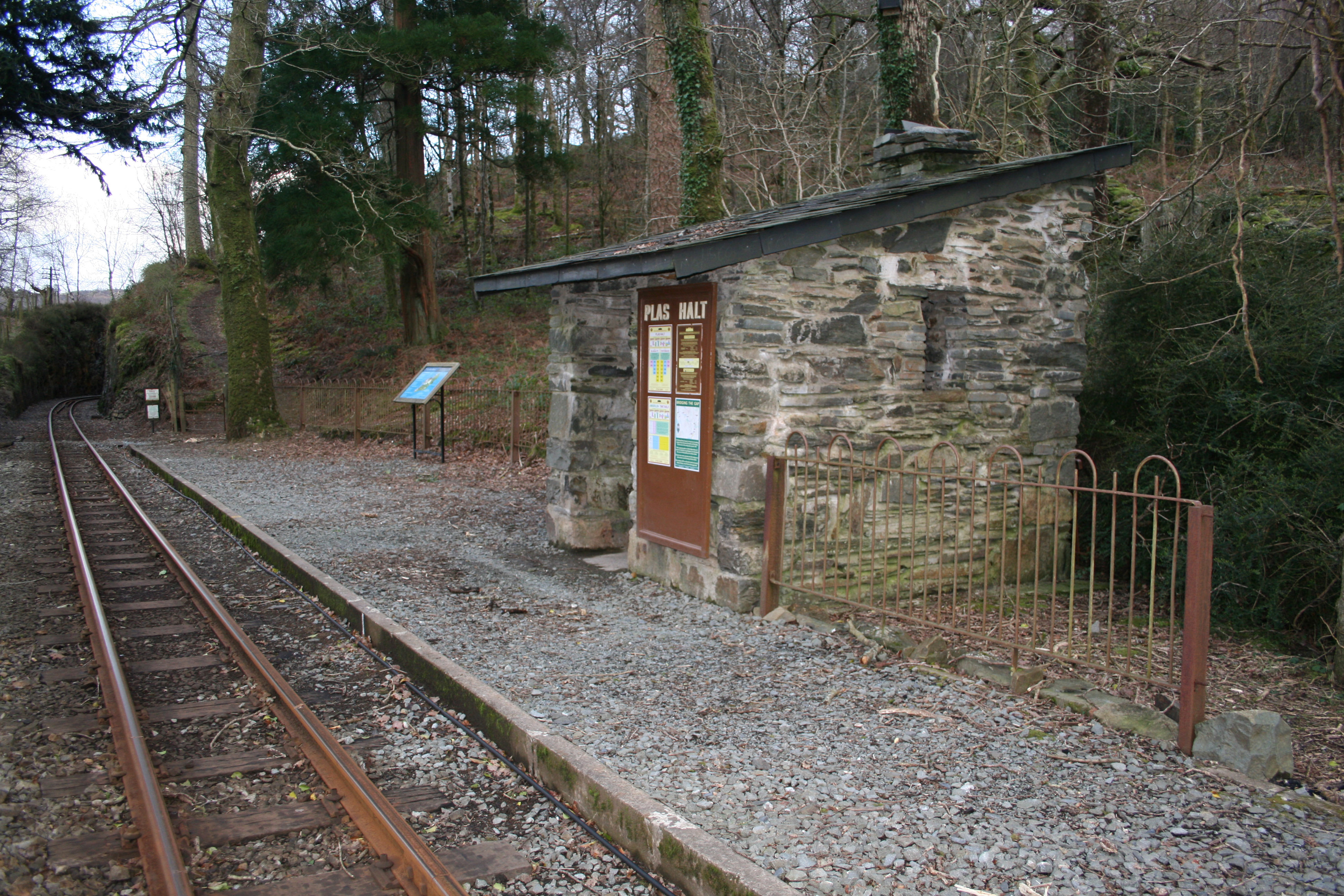
- Plas Halt

General information
- Location: Near Maentwrog, Gwynedd; Wales
- Coordinates: 52.948°N 4.003°W
- Grid reference: SH654408
- System: Station on heritage railway
- Owner: Festiniog Railway Company
- Manager: Ffestiniog Railway
- Platforms: 1

Key dates
- 31 May 1963: Opened
Location

Plas Halt is an unstaffed halt on the narrow gauge Ffestiniog Railway in Wales, which was built in 1836 to carry dressed slate from Blaenau Ffestiniog to Porthmadog for export by sea.

== History ==
The halt was established in 1963. Construction took place on the evening of Thursday 30 May 1963 and the morning of Friday 31 May 1963 and it was officially opened later that same day by Mr John Bibby the then owner of Plas Tan-y-Bwlch. The halt was intended to serve a proposed chalet development on the estate. Subsequently, it has been much used in connection with courses at the Snowdonia National Park Environmental Study Centre now based at Plas Tan-y-Bwlch. A stone passenger shelter was built at Plas Halt by volunteers from the Thames Valley Group of the Ffestiniog Railway Society in 1989. The halt is located at Zigzag Crossing to the North of Tyler's Curve above Plas Tan-y-Bwlch at a height of 375 ft. and a distance from Porthmadog of 6 miles 19 chains. A century earlier, Mr William E. Oakeley of Plas Tan-y-Bwlch had a private station nearby.

Plas Halt is used chiefly by visitors and guests of Plas Tan-y-Bwlch and also by walkers using the footpaths from Zigzag Crossing. Visitors can also walk down into Maentwrog using these paths. The gardens at Plas Tan-y-Bwlch are open to the public and combined train and garden tickets are available. Trains call at this halt only on request and intending passengers are advised to check with the Ffestiniog Railway Company before embarking on their journey.

== Services ==
Preceding station	Heritage railways	Following station
Penrhyn towards Porthmadog Harbour	Ffestiniog Railway	Tan-y-Bwlch towards Blaenau Ffestiniog
