= William Edward Oakeley =

British businessman (1828–1912)

William Edward Oakeley (1 August 1828–1 February 1912) was the owner of the Oakeley Quarry in Blaenau Ffestiniog.

He was the son of William Oakeley (1798–1834) and Mary Maria Miles and the grandson of Sir Charles Oakeley, 1st Baronet of Shrewsbury. He inherited the Plas Tan y Bwlch estate in 1868 from his father's cousin's widow, as she died childless.

Educated at Eton and Oxford, he married Mary Russell in 1860. He had four children but two of them died at a young age. The two remaining children were one boy and one girl. Edward de Clifford William Oakeley and Mary Caroline Oakeley (later to become Mary Inge.) His main home was Cliffe House, Twycross Leicestershire near Atherstone. During the 1881 census he lived there with his wife and daughter along with a teacher and 12 servants. He described his occupation as a Landed Proprietor.

He died on 1 February 1912 and was buried on 6 February. His death was reported in The Times and six days later a description of his funeral procession was published. His coffin was transported from his home at Cliffe House to Blaenau Ffestiniog by rail, and then by lorry to St Twrog's Church cemetery in Maentwrog. The lorry was followed by hundreds of workers from the Oakeley Quarry.
