= Cottesmore School =

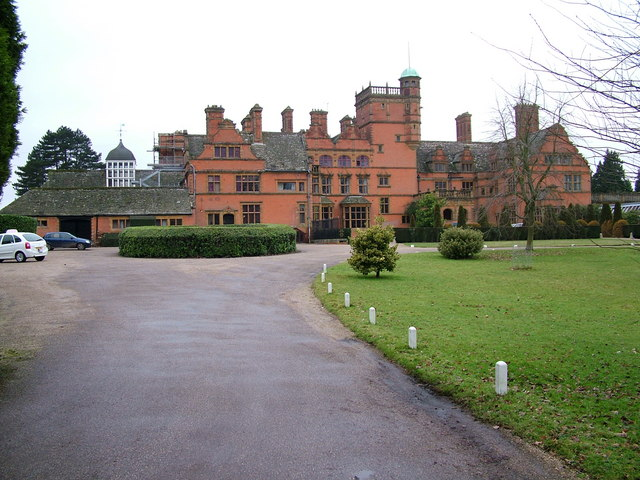

Location
- Buchan Hill; Pease Pottage, West Sussex, RH11 9AU; England
- Coordinates: 51°05′15″N 0°12′58″W

Information
- Type: Private preparatory school Boarding school
- Motto: Esto benignus, labora strenue, gaude (Latin for Be kind, work hard, have fun)
- Religious affiliation: Church of England
- Established: 1894
- Founder: Geoffrey Davison Brown
- Department for Education URN: 126106 Tables
- Headmaster: Tom Rogerson
- Gender: Coeducational
- Age: 4 to 13
- Enrolment: 200
- Colours: Blue and pink
- Website: https://www.cottesmoreschool.com

Listed Building – Grade II
- Official name: Main building to Cottesmore School
- Designated: 28 November 1980
- Reference no.: 1027012

Cottesmore is a boarding preparatory school in the United Kingdom, founded in 1894.

== History ==
Cottesmore was founded by Geoffrey Davison Brown in 1894 in Hove, East Sussex. He named the school after Cottesmore, Rutland, where he was born. The new buildings for the preparatory school were officially opened on 19 June 1897. Davison Brown served as headmaster until his death in 1929, aged 60.

In 1940 the school was evacuated from the south coast of England, to Wales, initially to the Oakeley Arms Hotel, Tan-y-bwlch, Merioneth, and later to a former workhouse in Cors-y-Gedol Hall, near Barmouth, until the end of the war.

The school moved to its present site at Pease Pottage after World War II in 1946. The school is housed in a Grade II-listed Victorian mansion known as Buchan Hill that was built in 1882–3 by Philip Felix Renaud Saillard. The building is a large Elizabethan-style house, designed by the architects Ernest George and Harold Peto. Buchan Hill had been purchased in the early 19th century by Thomas Erskine (Lord Chancellor 1806–1807), son of the Earl of Buchan.

In 2023, Cottesmore appointed the first AI headteacher, which they named Abigail Bailey, to assist the human headmaster. Bailey answers questions in the same manner as an AI chat bot like ChatGPT, with answers often found online. Additionally, students 4 to 13 were given their own individual AI teachers to help with their personal education and needs.

== Notable alumni ==
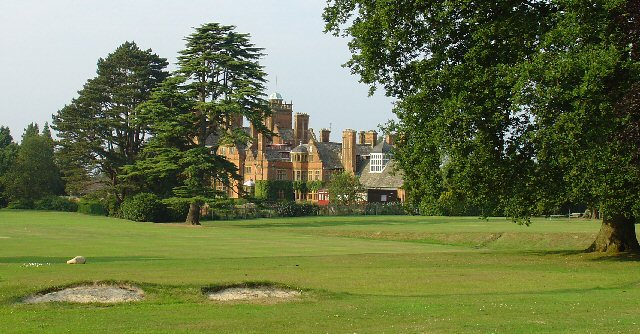
Cottesmore School from the neighbouring golf course

- Gordon Chater, actor and comedian
- Robert Hanbury Brown, astronomer
- Robin Niblett, director of Chatham House
- Thomas Sopwith, aviation pioneer
