= Rhyd, Gwynedd =

Halmet in Gwynedd, Wales

Coordinates: 52.957°N 4.030°W

Rhyd
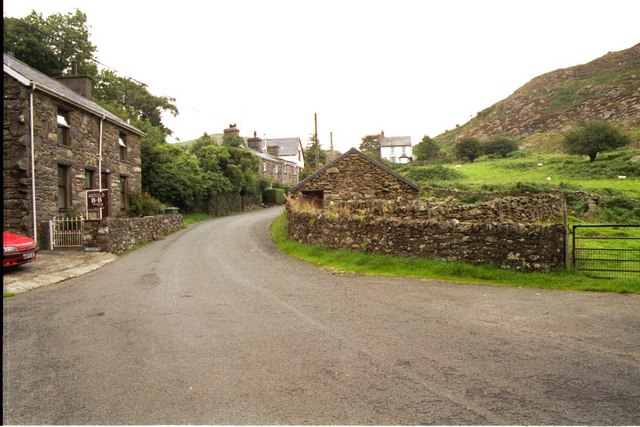
- Rhyd

- Location within Gwynedd
- OS grid reference: SH636419
- Community: Llanfrothen
- Principal area: Gwynedd
- Country: Wales
- Sovereign state: United Kingdom
- Post town: PENRHYNDEUDRAETH
- Postcode district: LL48
- Dialling code: 01766
- Police: North Wales
- Fire: North Wales
- Ambulance: Welsh
- UK Parliament: Dwyfor Meirionnydd
- Senedd Cymru – Welsh Parliament: Dwyfor Meirionnydd

Rhyd is a hamlet in the Welsh County of Gwynedd, located on the B4410 road, halfway between Maentwrog and Llanfrothen. Situated on an elevated site within the Snowdonia National Park, the village has views of the Moelwyns, notably Moelwyn Bach. The village is located one mile from Tan-y-Bwlch railway station, one of the principal stops on the historic Ffestiniog Railway. Nearby is Llyn Mair.
