= Dduallt railway station =

Railway station in Ffestiniog, Wales

Dduallt
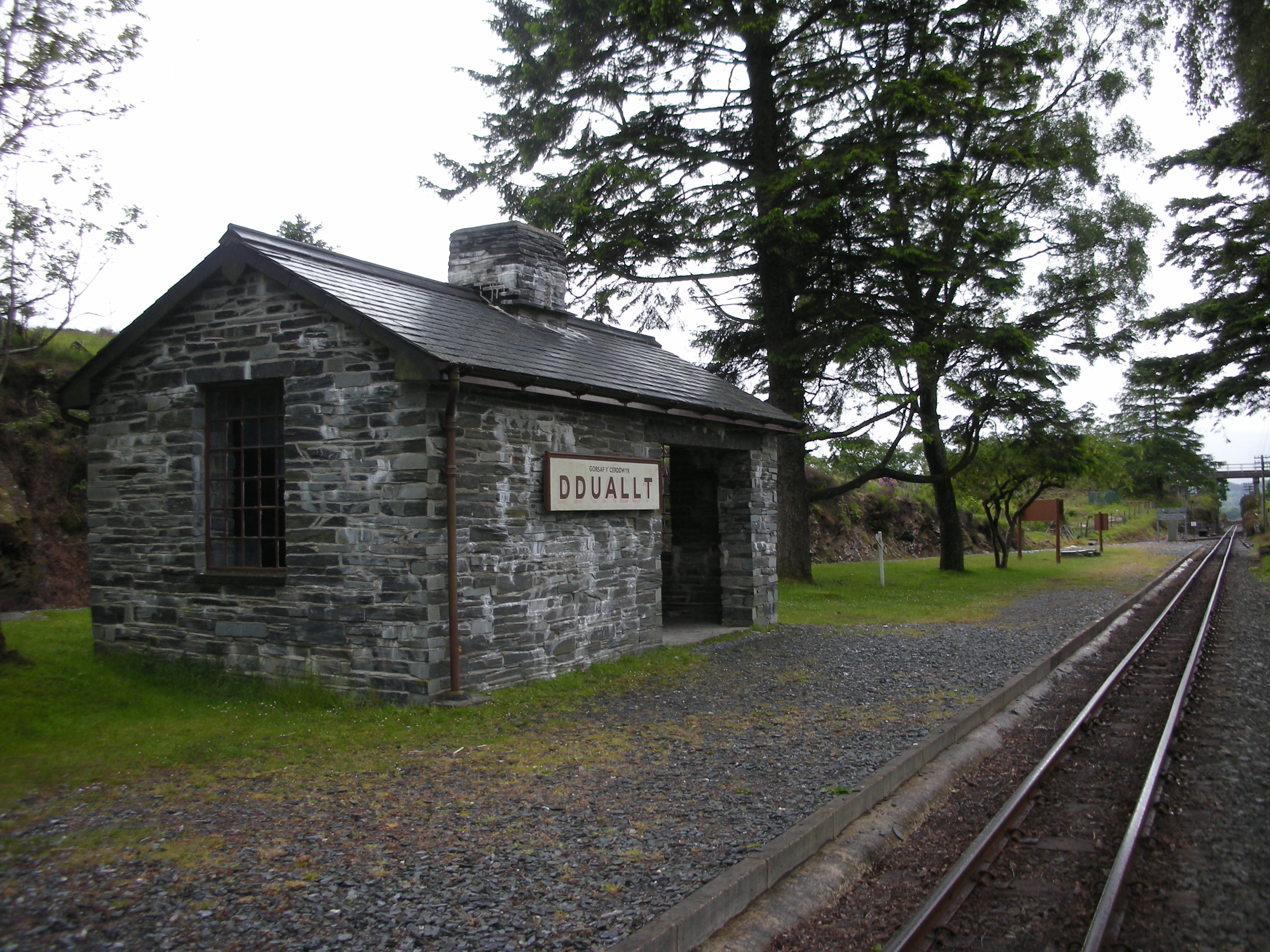
- Dduallt station.

General information
- Location: Ffestiniog, Gwynedd; Wales
- Coordinates: 52.9602°N 3.9686°W
- Grid reference: SH678421
- System: Station on heritage railway
- Operator: Ffestiniog Railway
- Platforms: 2

History
- Original company: Festiniog Railway

Key dates
- c. 1880: First mention as a station
- 15 September 1939: Closed
- 6 April 1968: Re-opened
- 1989: Passing loop facilities removed
Location

Dduallt railway station (English: Black hill) (pronounced [ˈðɨ.aɬt]) is a passenger station on the narrow gauge Ffestiniog Railway in northwest Wales, which was built in 1836 to carry dressed slate from Blaenau Ffestiniog to Porthmadog for export by sea.

Dduallt is at a height of 540 feet (160 m) and a distance of just over 9.5 miles (15.3 km) from Porthmadog.

== Station history ==
When steam traction was introduced on the railway in 1863, a slate water tank (which still exists) was established near Dduallt farm about 0.5 miles (0.8 km) below the present station and all up trains stopped for water. Regular use of this facility probably ceased about 1872 with the opening of Tan-y-Bwlch station (although up goods trains are said to have been required to stop at Dduallt for examination prior to passing through Moelwyn tunnel). There has never been road access to Dduallt station, which can only be reached by train or public footpaths.

The quiet station at Dduallt was first mentioned as a passenger station in 1880. It was established as a signalling block post in 1884 on the closure of Tunnel South Signal Box. It then declined steadily becoming an unstaffed halt in the 1930s (when it was landscaped by Clough Williams-Ellis who 40 years later advised on further landscaping) until final closure to passengers on 15 September 1939. Dduallt reopened to passenger trains on 6 April 1968, although passengers could not alight at the station for another few weeks because of continuing building work. The original slate water tank was recommissioned in May 1969 as an emergency supply and later a water supply was provided at the station, which was the upper terminus until 8 July 1977.

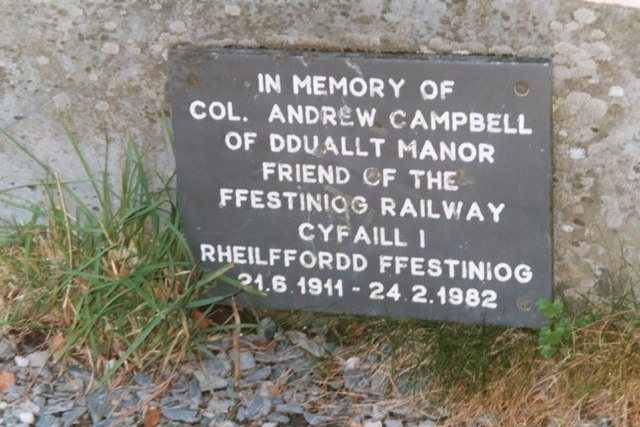
The slate tablet dedicated to Colonel Campbell at Dduallt.

== Facilities ==
The present buildings at Dduallt are a water supply tank (now out of use), a stone built shelter constructed by volunteers in 1998, and Rhoslyn cottage, which latterly was always privately owned until it was bought, derelict, by the Festiniog Railway Company in 2005.

The land in the centre of Dduallt spiral is the knoll of a small hill and it is set out with an orientation table as a viewing point with extensive views over the upper vale of Ffestiniog. The knoll is a popular picnic spot in the summer.

Dduallt station is operated as an unstaffed halt and trains only call on request. Passengers intending to travel are advised to check with the Ffestiniog Railway Company before embarking on their journey.

== The Deviation ==
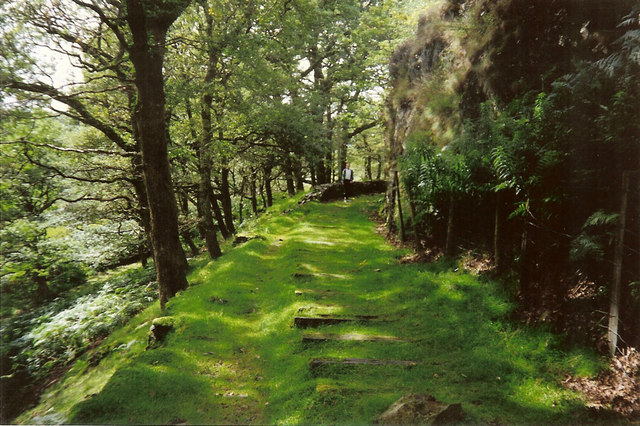
The old trackbed, now disused.

Dduallt was the starting point for the Ffestiniog Railway Deviation, the 2.5 miles (4.0 km) diversionary route built between 1965 and 1978 to bypass the Ffestiniog Power Station pumped-storage hydroelectric power station, one of two pumped-storage schemes in Wales, and its lower reservoir (Llyn Ystradau). The Deviation (this is the conventional name for such railway works) was built mostly by volunteers and involved a 310 yards (280 m) long new tunnel constructed by three Cornish tin mining engineers (and some employees) between 1975 and 1977. At the southern end is the spectacular Dduallt spiral formation constructed with its bridge entirely by volunteers to gain an initial height rise of 35 feet (11 m) in order (after a further mile of the new railway and the new tunnel) to clear the flooded track bed north of the former tunnel. Parts of the trackless former route can be clearly seen below the new route, particularly just north of Dduallt. The old tunnel is plugged near its northern end, which is usually underwater. Some delicate engineering work was required where the new line passes over the power station pipelines.

A pull and push service officially called The Shuttle and powered by diesel locomotive Moel Hebog with carriage 110 was operated from Dduallt to a temporary terminus at Gelliwiog, before the new Moelwyn Tunnel, from 26 May 1975, during two summers, to enable tourists to experience the excellent views from the Deviation route, in advance of the opening of the new Moelwyn Tunnel. For several years before this an earlier Shuttle had run between Tan-y-Bwlch and Dduallt in between the regular trains in the peak period. It was hauled by diesel locomotive Moelwyn with a short train of 4-wheeled coaches.

Another temporary terminus known as "Llyn Ystradau" (now dismantled) existed alongside the reservoir during 1977, but passengers were not permitted to leave the station other than by train since it was on Central Electricity Generating Board land without public access.

== Services ==
| Preceding station | Heritage railways | Following station |
|---|---|---|
| Campbell's Platform towards Porthmadog Harbour | Ffestiniog Railway | Tanygrisiau towards Blaenau Ffestiniog |
