= Tan-y-Bwlch, Maentwrog =

Coordinates: 52.947°N 3.997°W

Tan-y-Bwlch
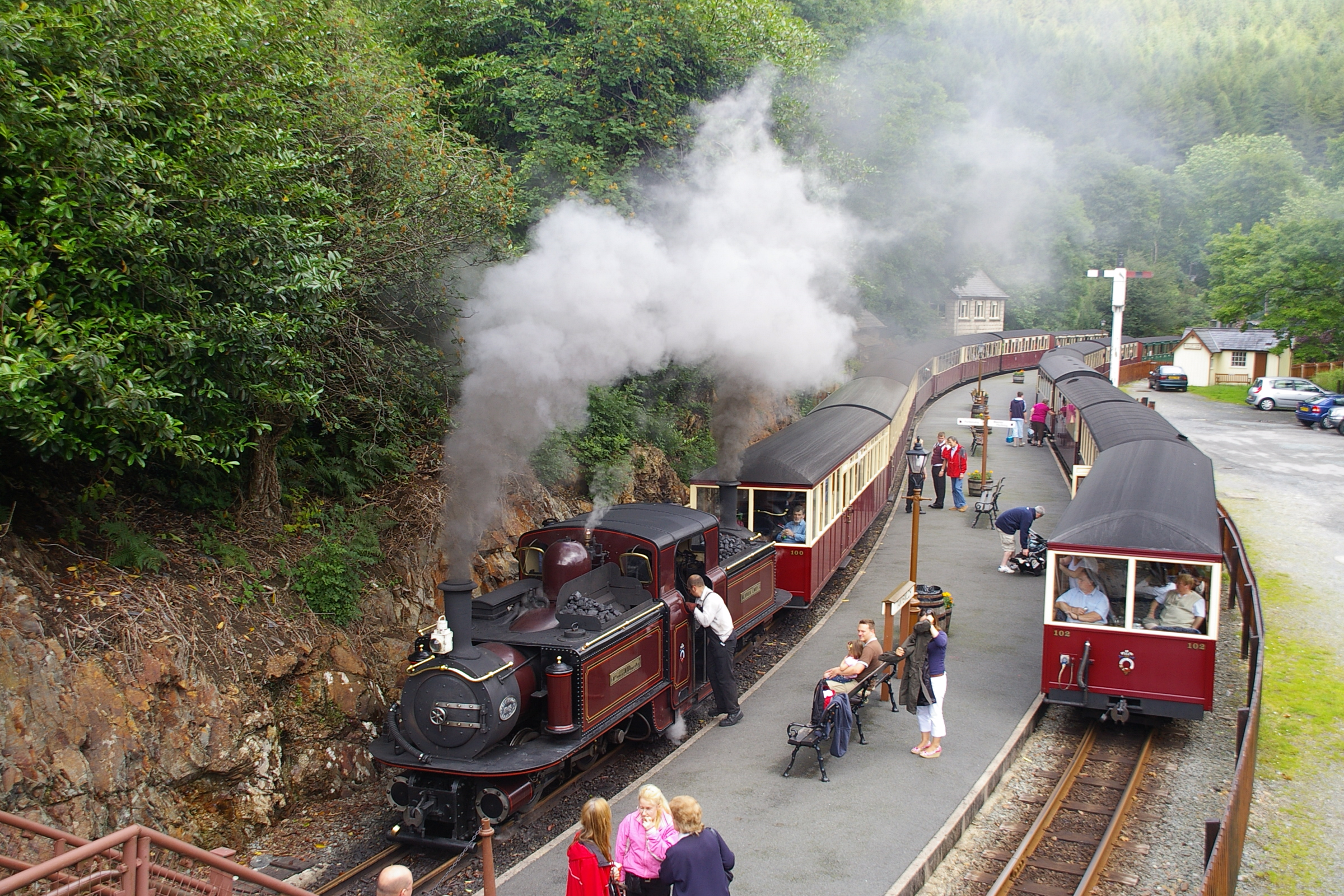
- Tan-y-Bwlch railway station

- Location within Gwynedd
- OS grid reference: SH657408
- Community: Maentwrog
- Principal area: Gwynedd
- Country: Wales
- Sovereign state: United Kingdom
- Post town: BLAENAU FFESTINIOG
- Postcode district: LL41
- Dialling code: 01766
- Police: North Wales
- Fire: North Wales
- Ambulance: Welsh
- UK Parliament: Dwyfor Meirionnydd
- Senedd Cymru – Welsh Parliament: Dwyfor Meirionnydd

Tan-y-Bwlch (Welsh for Under the pass/gap) lies in the Snowdonia National Park in North Wales and is primarily known as the location of Tan-y-Bwlch railway station, on the narrow gauge Ffestiniog Railway.

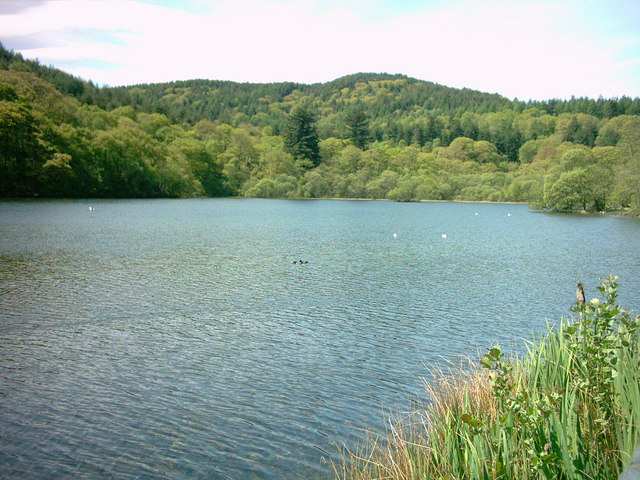
Llyn Mair, looking towards Coed Llyn Y Garnedd

Llyn Mair, an artificially created lake, is a popular picnic place, and there is a walk around it.

Nearby is Plas Tan-y-Bwlch, which today is the Snowdonia National Park environmental studies centre, administered by the National Park Authority.
