= St Twrog's Church, Bodwrog =

Coordinates: 53.271548°N 4.400469°W

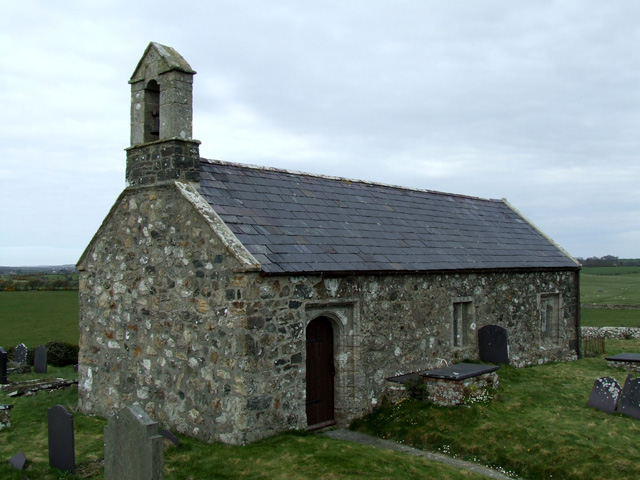
- The west and south sides of the church

- Location in Anglesey
- Location: Bodwrog, Anglesey
- Country: Wales
- Denomination: Church in Wales

History
- Status: Church
- Founded: Late 15th century
- Dedication: St Twrog

Architecture
- Functional status: Active
- Heritage designation: Grade II*
- Designated: 5 April 1971
- Style: Medieval

Specifications
- Length: 46 ft (14.0 m)
- Width: 13 ft (4.0 m)
- Materials: Rubble masonry

Administration
- Province: Province of Wales
- Diocese: Diocese of Bangor
- Archdeaconry: Bangor
- Deanery: Malltraeth
- Parish: Llandrygarn with Bodwrog with Heneglwys with Trewalchmai with Llannerch-y-medd

Clergy
- Rector: Vacant since December 2000

St Twrog's Church is a small rural church at Bodwrog in Anglesey, North Wales. Built in the late 15th century in a medieval style, some alterations have been made but much of the original structure still remains. It has two 15th-century doorways (one later converted into a window) and some 15th-century windows. The bull's head decoration used on the church denotes a connection with the Bulkeleys of Beaumaris, a prominent north Wales family over several centuries. Set in a remote part of the countryside in the middle of Anglesey, it is dedicated to St Twrog, who was active in the late 5th and early 6th centuries. The church's tithes were paid for at least two hundred years to Jesus College, Oxford, which has historically strong links with Wales, and the college at one point built a house for the priest who served St Twrog's and a neighbouring parish.

The church has been made redundant for worship by the Church in Wales. It is a Grade II* listed building, a national designation given to "particularly important buildings of more than special interest", in particular because it is regarded as "a good rural late Medieval church". It is built from rubble masonry with a slate roof. The interior is lit by gas lamps.

Since 2024, St Twrog's Church is under the care of Friends of Friendless Churches, a charity which cares for redundant churches in England and Wales. As of May 2025 the church is open to visitors.

== History and location ==
The church is in a churchyard in "a remote rural location" on Anglesey, Wales, about 4 miles (6.4 km) from the county town of Llangefni, at the side of a small road between Gwalchmai and Llynfaes. The date of first construction of a Christian building at this location is unknown. The parish takes its name from Twrog, a saint who lived in the late 5th and early 6th centuries, to whom the church is dedicated: the Welsh word bod means "abode" or "dwelling", and "-wrog" is a modified form of the saint's name – i.e. "Twrog's dwelling". One of his brothers, St Gredifael, is commemorated in another Anglesey church, St Gredifael's Church, Penmynydd.

The present church dates from the time of King Henry VII (ruled 1485–1509), when a significant amount of building work took place in Wales. Some more windows were added in the 17th or 18th century, and the church was restored in the mid to late 19th century. The writer Samuel Lewis recorded in 1849 that St Twrog's was attached to St Trygarn's Church, Llandrygarn, with the priest serving the two parishes residing in Llandrygarn. The church tithes had been paid to Jesus College, Oxford (who had built a "neat parsonage-house" in Llandrygarn) since 1648, Lewis said, subject to a small deduction for distribution to the poor of the parish. The tithes were given to the college (which has had strong connections with Wales since its foundation in 1571) by a Dr Wynne, Chancellor of Llandaff Cathedral.

St Twrog's is no longer in use for worship by the Church in Wales. It was one of seven churches in a group of parishes served by the same priest (Llandrygarn with Bodwrog with Heneglwys with Trewalchmai with Llannerch-y-medd). Other churches in the combined parishes include St Cwyllog, Llangwyllog and St Mary, Llannerch-y-medd. It is within the deanery of Malltraeth, the archdeaconry of Bangor and the Diocese of Bangor.

== Architecture and repairs ==
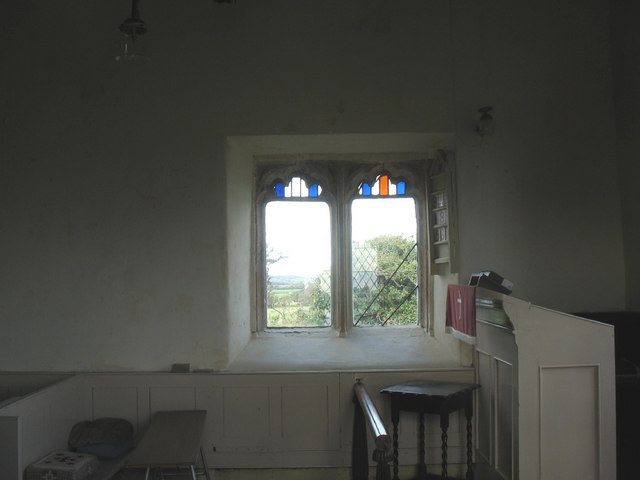
One of the windows on the north side, with pews to the left and a desk or pulpit to the right

The church is built from rubble masonry, dressed with limestone. The roof is made from slate, with a stone bellcote at the west end and a bell dating from 1668. There is no structural division between the nave and chancel, although there is a step and a rail denoting the sanctuary, and overall the church measures about 46 by 13 feet (14.0 by 4.0 m). On the south side of the church, there are two windows and a 15th-century square-framed entrance door, which is at the west end; there are three windows on the north side. The east window and the two easternmost windows on the north and south sides date from the late 15th century. Like the rest of the windows, these are made wholly or mainly from clear glass; none of the windows is made entirely of stained glass. The east window has three long narrow lights (sections of window separated by mullions or tracery) each with an ogee (double arc shaped) curve at the top, topped with eight smaller lights arranged with four in the centre. The other two 15th-century windows are set in square frames and have pairs of lights headed with cinquefoils (a five leaf pattern). The rectangular windows in the middle of the north and south walls were added in the 17th or 18th century, and have pairs of lights. The westernmost window on the north side is a converted 15th-century door; it bears designs of a leaf pattern on one side and three bull's heads on the other. The three bull's heads pattern is associated with the Bulkeley family of Beaumaris, who were prominent and influential landowners, in Anglesey and elsewhere in north Wales, from the 15th to the 19th centuries. In 1500, about the time that the church was rebuilt, Richard Bulkeley was Archdeacon of Anglesey and so would have been involved in the work here, and is likely to have contributed towards the cost. A bull's head is carved into a stone above the doorway.

The roof dates from the 19th century and the supporting woodwork structure can be seen from inside the church. The church, which is lit by gas lamps, contains box pews in the nave, and a panelled reading desk with a matching pulpit, one on each side in the sanctuary. Cream paint has been used for the pews, pulpit and reading desk. There are some 18th-century memorial tablets on the south wall of the nave. A 1937 survey by the Royal Commission on Ancient and Historical Monuments in Wales and Monmouthshire noted an oak collecting shovel dated 1733, a silver cup dated 1773 and a font of uncertain date.

Repairs undertaken by Friends of Friendless Churches from 2024 to 2025 focused on damp from defective drains and the high external ground level on the south side of the church, which caused much of the timber to rot. Workers reduced the moisture levels in the building through better drainage, lowering the ground level as archaeology permits, and increasing ventilation to the interior of the building. Mould and vegetation growth was a problem due to this dampness. Friends of Friendless Churches removed any growth and replastered the walls with lime plaster and limewash after controlling the damp. Repairs also included mending the roof, overhauling the rainwater goods and the below ground drainage, repairing the glazing to the windows, mending the paneling and pews, raking out the cementitious pointing, and repointing the external masonry in lime mortar.

== Assessment ==
The church has national recognition and statutory protection from alteration as it has been designated as a Grade II* listed building – the second-highest of the three grades of listing, designating "particularly important buildings of more than special interest". It was given this status on 5 April 1971, and has been listed because it is regarded as "a good rural late Medieval church". Cadw (the Welsh Assembly Government body responsible for the built heritage of Wales and the inclusion of Welsh buildings on the statutory lists) also notes that the church has "a simple traditional character", and that it retains "many original features."

Writing in 1862, the clergyman and antiquarian Harry Longueville Jones said that the east window was similar to windows in the south aisle of St Cybi's Church, Holyhead. A 2009 guide to the buildings of the region also comments upon the east window, saying that it was "surprisingly grand". A 2006 guide to the churches of Anglesey says that St Twrog's is in "an elevated spot in a remote rural location." It notes that the east window was "much weathered", but that overall the building "appears to be in fairly good condition."

== See also ==
- St Twrog's Church, Maentwrog
