= St Twrog's Church, Maentwrog =

Church in Maentwrog, north Wales

Saint Twrog's Church
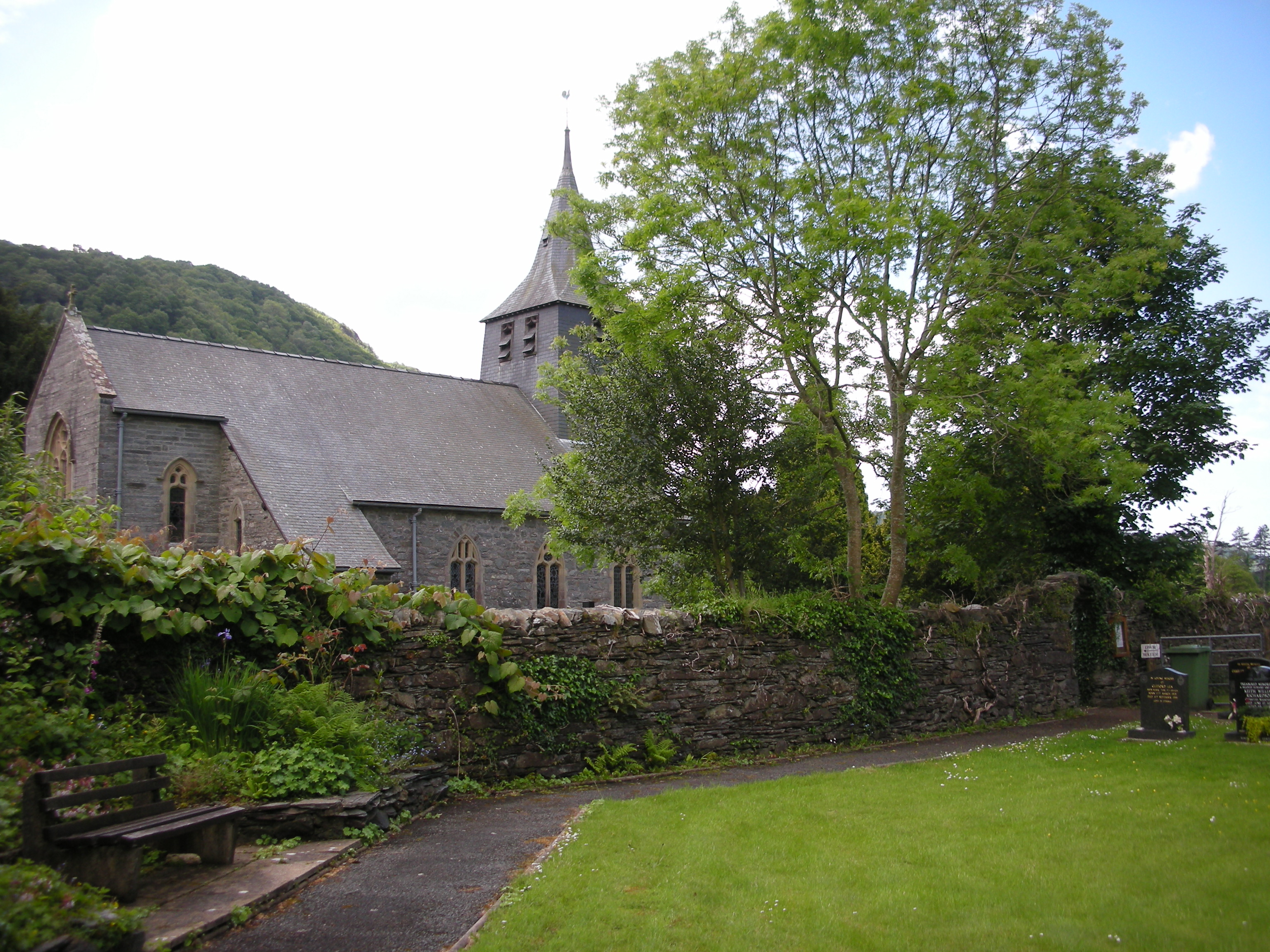
- St. Twrog's Church

- Maentwrog in Gwynedd

Religion
- Affiliation: Church in Wales
- District: Diocese of Bangor
- Ecclesiastical or organisational status: Parish church

Location
- Location: Maentwrog, Gwynedd, Wales
- Coordinates: 52.9456°N 3.9895°W

Architecture
- Architect: John Douglas
- Type: Church
- Completed: 1896
- Materials: Granite, Slate roof

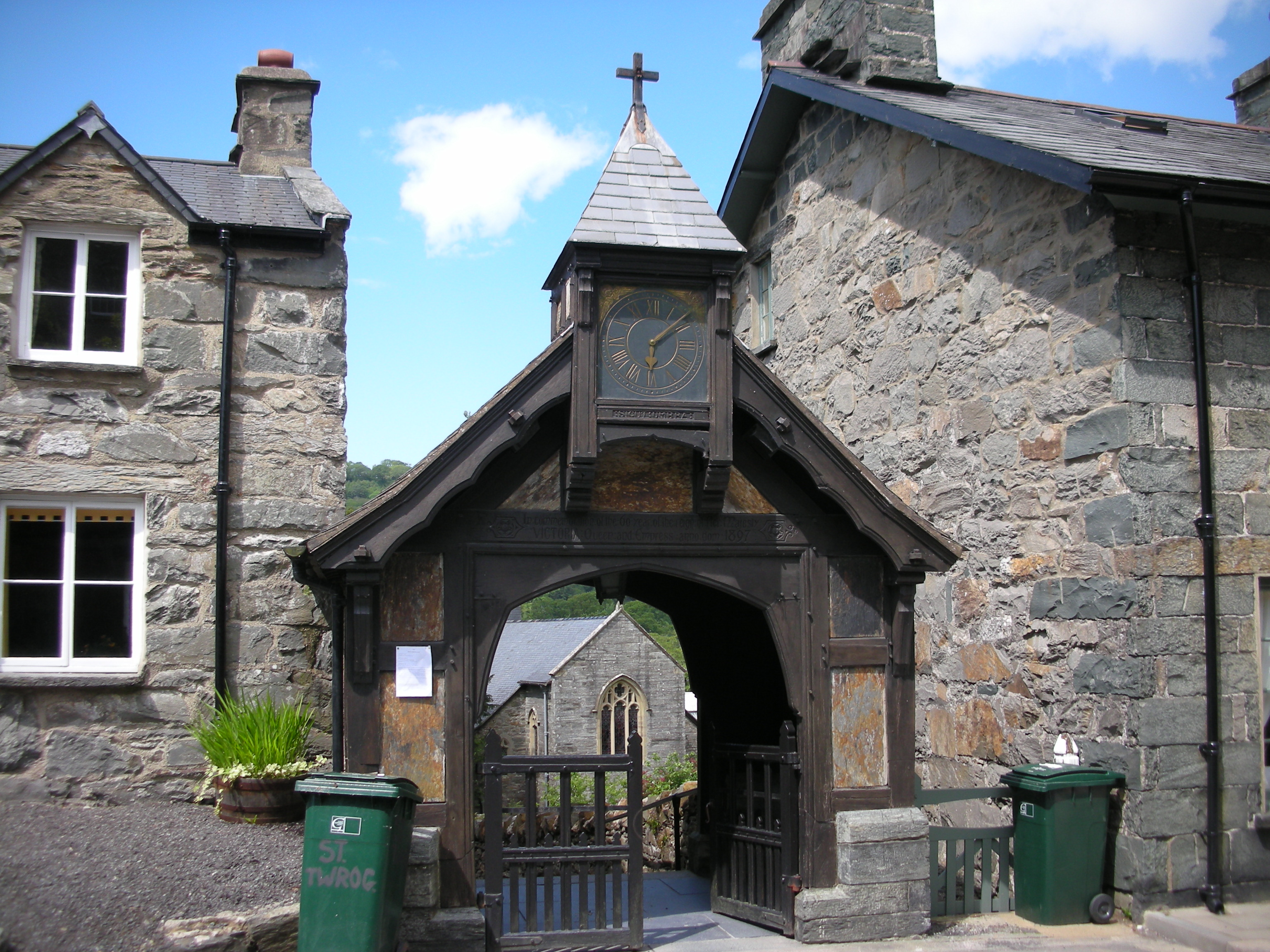
Lych Gate at St. Twrog's Church, Maentwrog

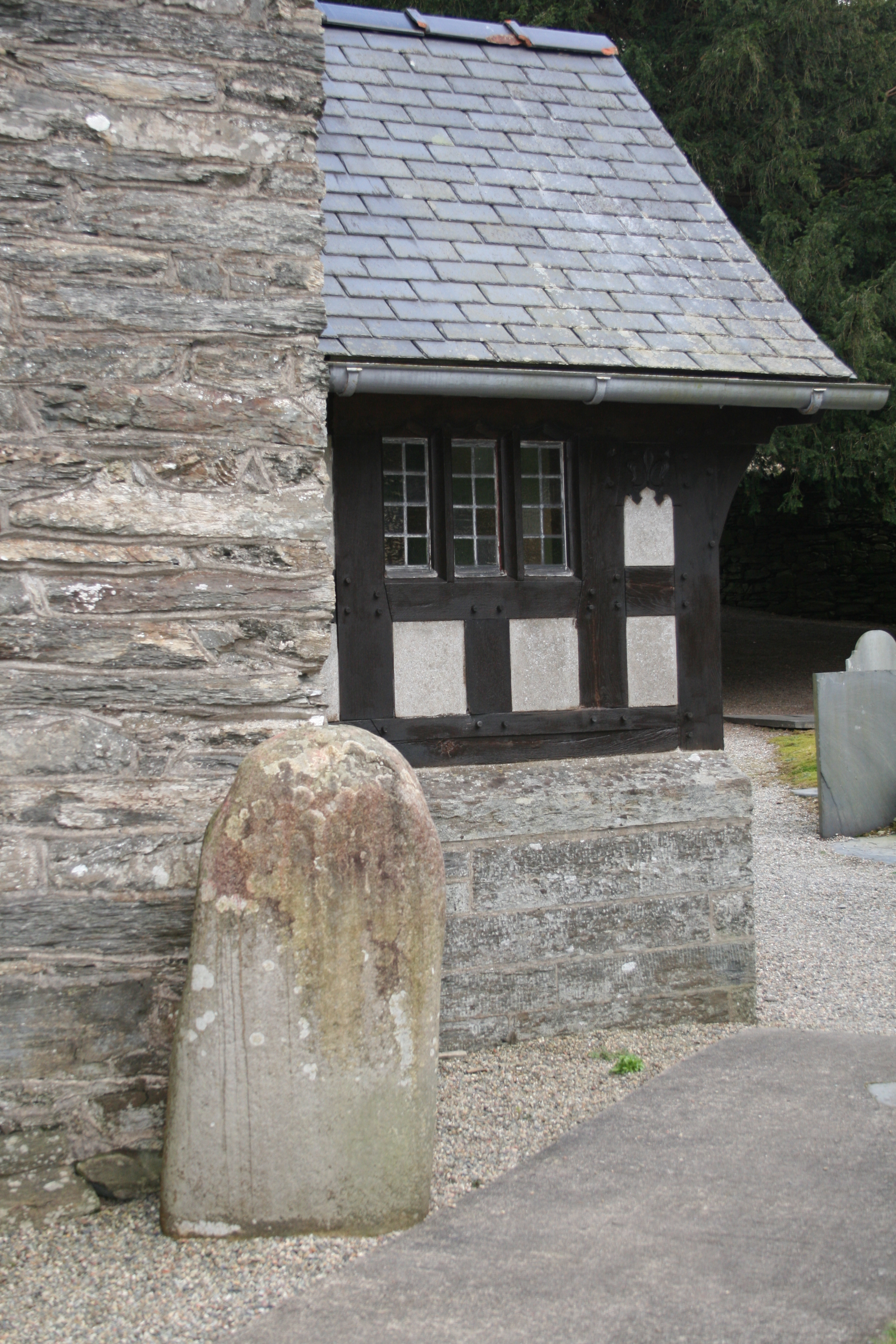
Twrog's Stone in St. Twrog's Church, Maentwrog

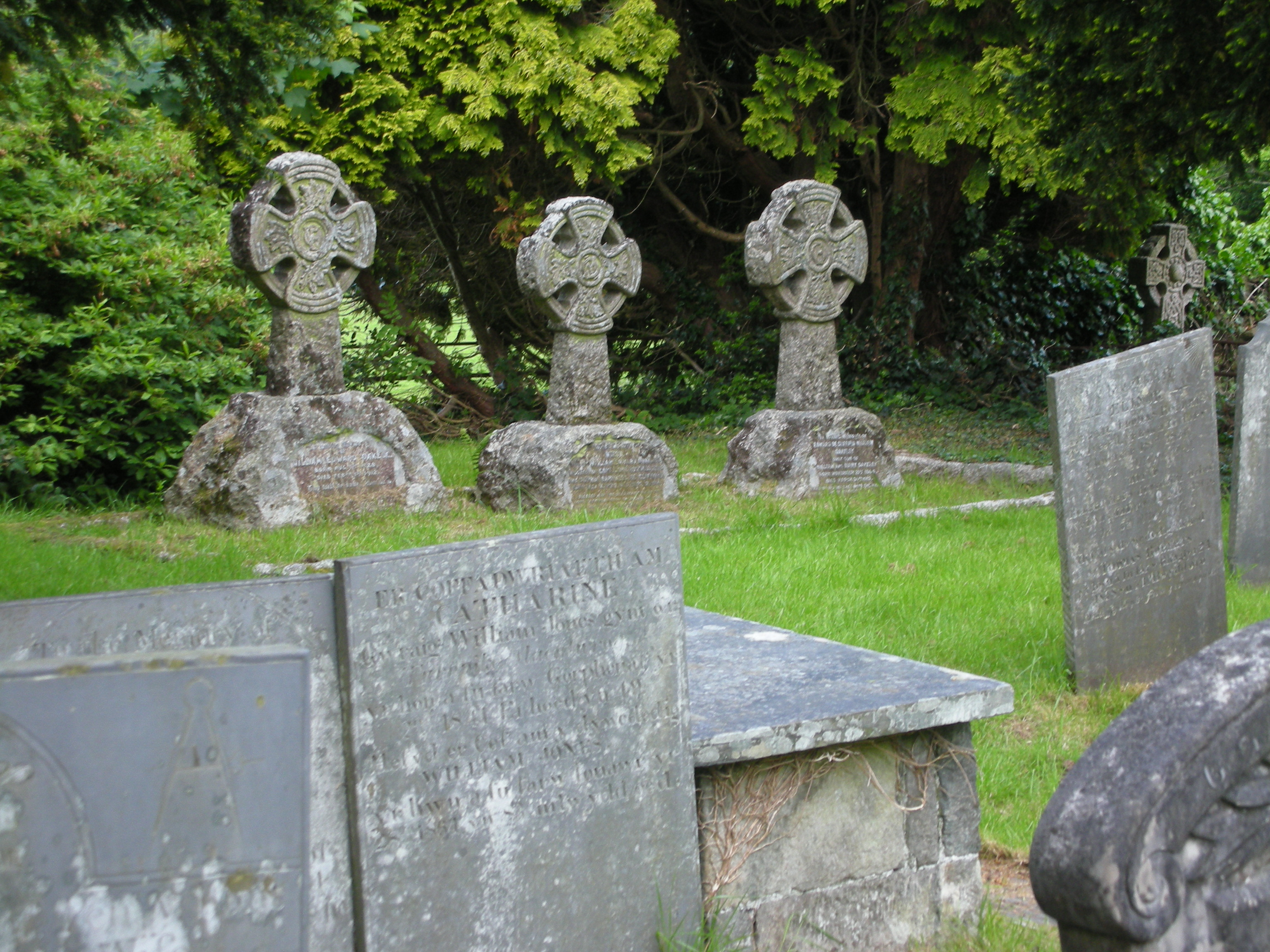
Oakeley Celtic Crosses in St. Twrog's Church, Maentwrog

Saint Twrog's Church is in the village of Maentwrog in the Welsh county of Gwynedd, lying in the Vale of Ffestiniog, within the Snowdonia National Park. It is in the Deanery of Ardudwy. It is designated by Cadw as a Grade II listed building.

A church was founded on the current site in the 6th century by Saint Twrog. It is believed that he was the son of Ithel Hael o Lydaw of Brittany. He was also the brother of Saint Tanwg of Llandanwg, Saint Tegai of Llandygai and Saint Baglan of Llanfaglan and Baglan.

There are two other dedications to Saint Twrog: at Bodwrog in Anglesey and at Llandwrog. When Twrog first arrived in the village, the valley would have been very marshy, which provided him with the wattle that he would have needed to build his cell. Out the church near to the belfry door is a large stone known as Maen Twrog (maen being the Welsh for stone). Twrog is reputed to have thrown the stone from the top of Moelwyn crushing a pagan altar in the valley below; it is said that his handprints can still be seen in the stone. The parish of Maentwrog gets its name from this stone

The yew trees in the churchyard are said to be over 1300 years old. They were a feature of the ancient pagan burial places, their evergreen leaves being a symbol of immortality; however, 1300 years ago the site would have been Christian not pagan. Another use of the yew trees was for military purposes as the yew timber was excellent for making bows, but because of the poisonous nature of the yew trees they were not popular among the people and were therefore grown in relative safety in places such as churchyards.

The church that was on the site before 1896 was dedicated to Saint Mary, which has a connection to the Cistercian monks who were very numerous in the Maentwrog valley at one time. In the village there is also Saint Mary's well and across the valley is Llyn Mair (Saint Mary's Lake). In 1504, the church was described as a chapelry attached to the extensive parish of Ffestiniog. During the years 1572 to 1624, the notable Edmwnd Prys was rector of the church. He translated the metrical psalms into Welsh, and the present west window commemorates his work.

The church was rebuilt in 1814 on the old foundations and was described as a neat stone edifice and was rectangular with a square embattled tower. There was no chancel at that time, the altar being placed in front of the present altar rails, with the door and porch being on the north side. On the west wall of the church there were three small windows. In 1896 a new chancel was built along with a baptistery and new stained glass windows were installed consisting of the east and west windows and the small "Good Shepherd" window. The vestry window "Son of Consolation" is in memory of William Edward Oakeley, benefactor of the parish, with whose help the church was restored in 1896, his wife Mary Oakeley executed the beautiful carvings. During this alteration, the bell was replaced by an eight tubular bells and the present organ was installed at the same time. The old bell was installed in the village school tower. The architect responsible for the alteration work to the church in 1896 was John Douglas who was also responsible for the design of the lych gate.

There are some memorials on the north side of the church and on both sides of the altar which were transferred from the 1814 church, and there is a carving of Saint Twrog on the pulpit. A fragment of Edmwnd Prys' pulpit also remains. The parish register goes back to 1695. Outside in the graveyard are three Celtic Cross style memorials to members of the Oakeley family. There is also a very old attractive church entrance gate which opens on the main road in Maentwrog.

== See also ==
- List of church restorations, amendments and furniture by John Douglas
- St Twrog's Church, Bodwrog on Anglesey
