= Maentwrog =

Village in Merionethshire, Wales

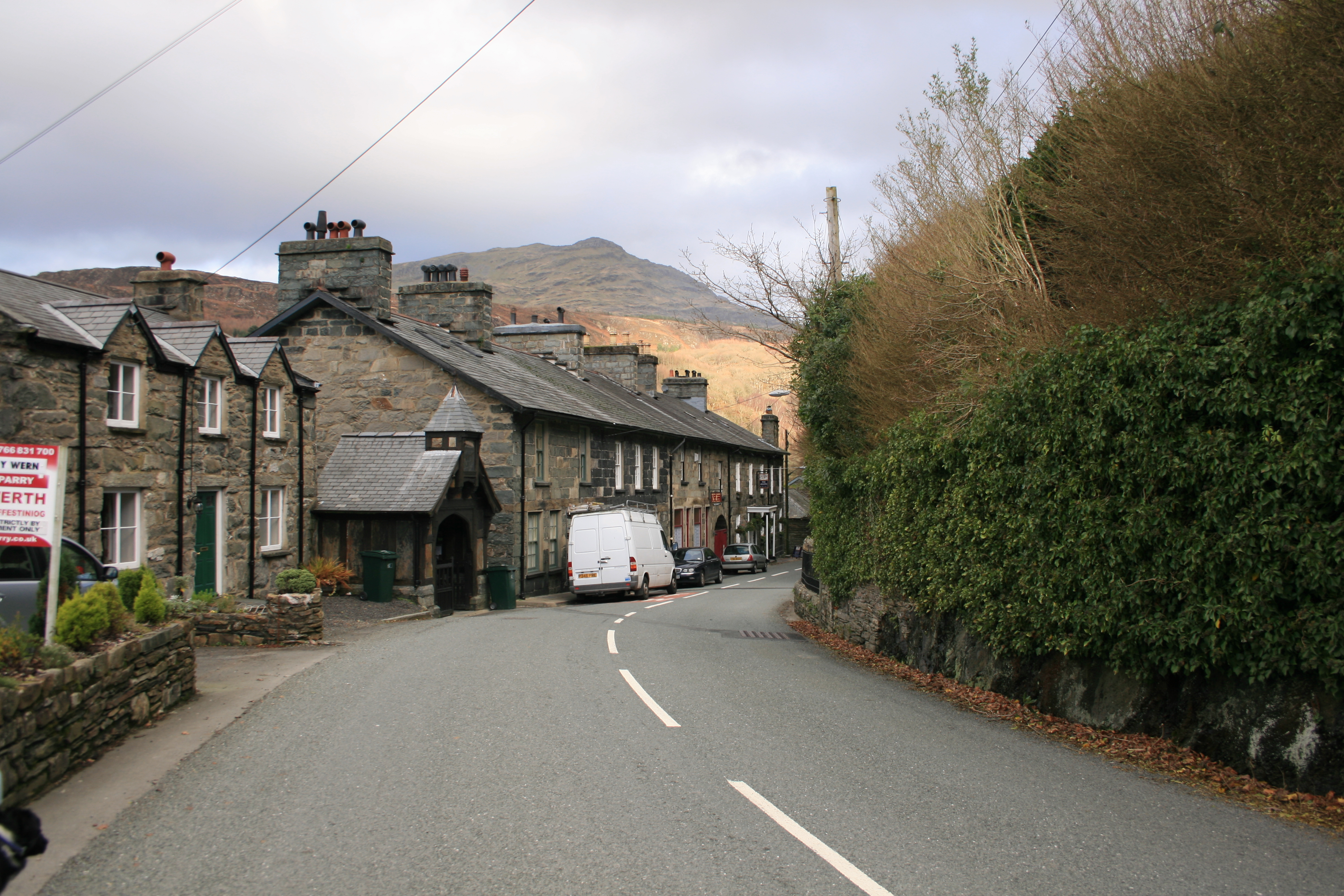
- Maentwrog

- Location within Gwynedd
- Population: 631 (2011)
- OS grid reference: SH665405
- Community: Maentwrog
- Principal area: Gwynedd
- Country: Wales
- Sovereign state: United Kingdom
- Post town: BLAENAU FFESTINIOG
- Postcode district: LL41
- Dialling code: 01766
- Police: North Wales
- Fire: North Wales
- Ambulance: Welsh
- UK Parliament: Dwyfor Meirionnydd
- Senedd Cymru – Welsh Parliament: Dwyfor Meirionnydd
- List of places UK Wales Gwynedd 52.945°N 3.988°W Map of the community

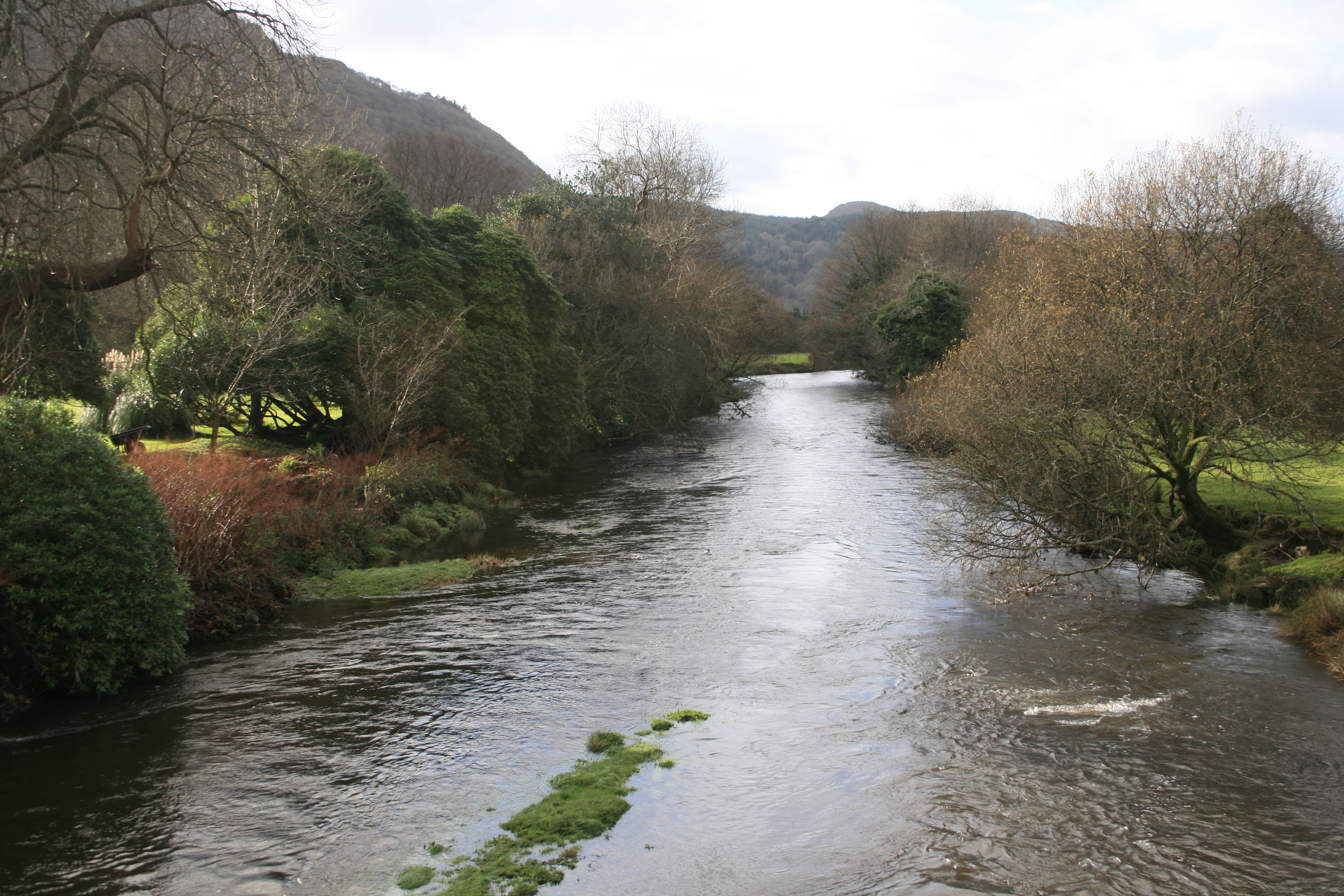
River Dwyryd in Maentwrog

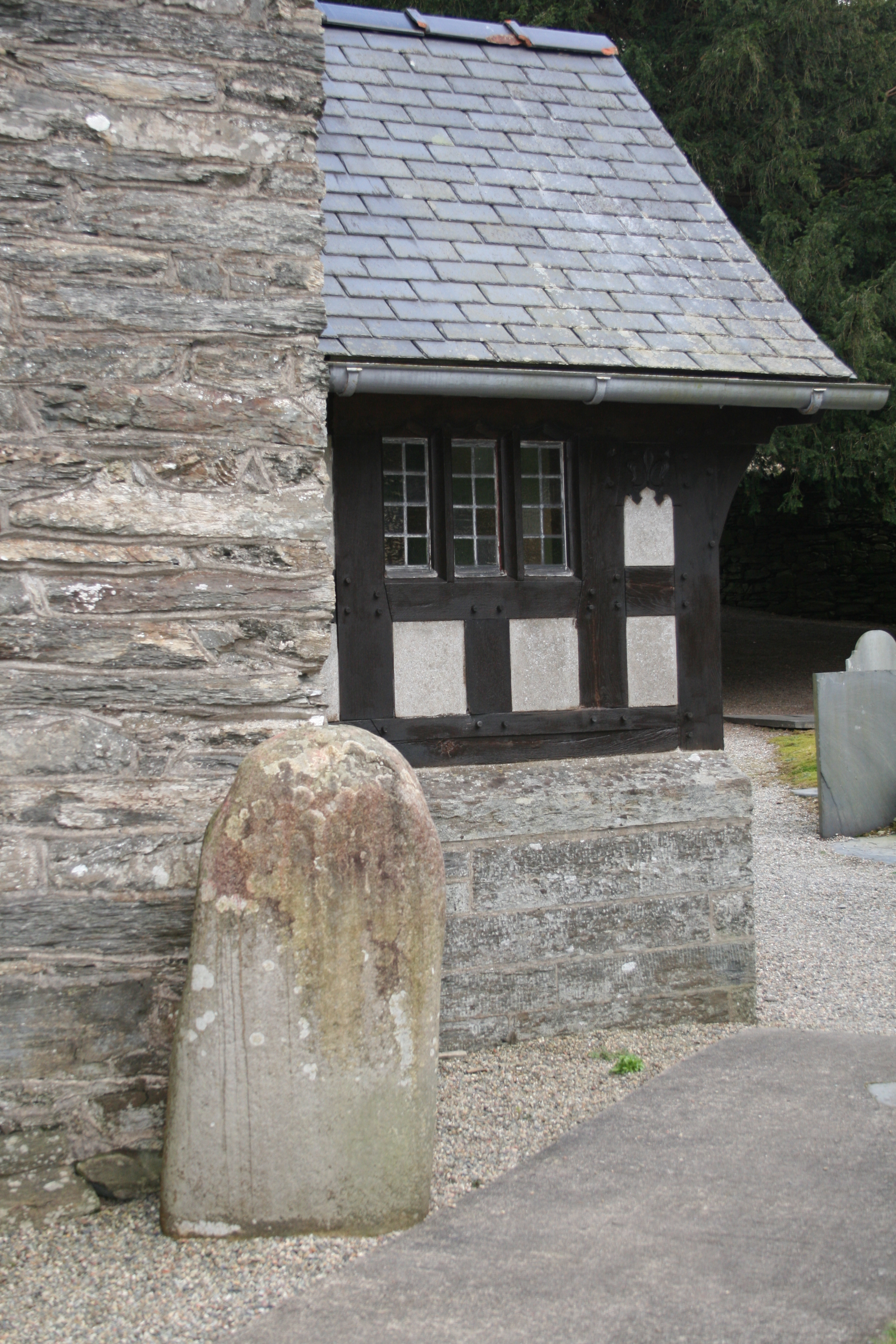
Twrog's Stone in Maentwrog

Maentwrog (Welsh pronunciation) is a village and community in the Welsh county of Merionethshire (now part of Gwynedd), lying in the Vale of Ffestiniog just below Blaenau Ffestiniog, within the Snowdonia National Park. The River Dwyryd runs alongside the village. Its population of 585 in 2001 increased to 631 at the 2011 Census. The Community of Maentwrog includes the village of Gellilydan.

== Location and transport ==
The village lies on the A496 between Harlech and Blaenau Ffestiniog, and also on the Roman road Sarn Helen, now classified as the B4410, at the junction with the A487 from Porthmadog, leading to the A470 (to Trawsfynydd and Dolgellau).

Nearby Plas Tan y Bwlch, substantially rebuilt during the 19th century by the rich Oakeley family on the site of a first house probably built in the early 17th century, overlooks the village. Plas Tan y Bwlch has its own halt - Plas Halt - on the Ffestiniog Railway, and nearby Tan-y-Bwlch railway station is the railway's principal intermediate station. The National Gazetteer of Great Britain and Ireland (1868) stated that Tan-y-Bwlch was the postal town of Maentwrog.

Between 1882 and 1964 the nearest mainline station for passengers was 'Maentwrog Road', some two miles away; the use of "Road" in a station's name was a GWR euphemism for "not near the settlement in the station's name".

== Etymology ==
Maentwrog means "Twrog's stone" (Welsh maen = stone). According to legend, a giant known as Twrog hurled a boulder from the top of a hill down into the settlement, destroying a pagan altar. This stone is said to be the one located in St Twrog's Church courtyard. It is said that if one rubs this boulder one is fated to return to the village in the future.

The name was already in existence before the 12th Century as, according to a story found in the Mabinogion, Pryderi is buried "at Maen Tyfiawg, above Y Felenrhyd" after being killed by Gwydion in a battle at Y Felenrhyd on the banks of the River Dwyryd about a mile from the town. The boulder supposedly hurled by the giant is also the one said to mark Pryderi's grave. An alternative source, the 'Stanzas of the Graves' from The Black Book of Carmarthen, states that the grave is at Aber Gwenoli which is located in the woodland now known as Coed Felinrhyd just above Y Felenrhyd.

== History ==
The church is dedicated to the memory of Twrog, an eminent British saint, who lived in the 5th and 6th Centuries. According to information in St Twrog's Church, based on a late addition to the Bonedd y Saint, there were four brothers and sons of Ithel Hael o Lydaw (Brittany) who came to Wales as Christian missionaries:

- Saint Baglan is the founder and patron saint of Baglan;
- Saint Tanwg is the founder and patron saint of Llandanwg;
- Saint Tegai is the founder and patron saint of Llandegai;
- Saint Twrog is the founder and patron saint of Llandwrog and of Maentwrog.

The village settlement expanded in the 19th century to house workers from local slate mines. Within the village community is the imposing Plas Tan y Bwlch, home of the Snowdonia National Park Study Centre and former residence of the Oakeley family.

Maentwrog hydro-electric power station was opened in 1928, and still produces electricity today. It is supplied by water from Llyn Trawsfynydd, a large man-made reservoir located near the village of Trawsfynydd.

The power station produces electricity for the local Welsh Power network while controlling the level of the water in the lake to protect the local wildlife on the lake shores.

The station has 2 turbine sets, capable of producing approximately 32 MW, the head of water being roughly 180m.

== Social facilities ==
There are two village inns: The Grapes Hotel, a 17th-century Grade II listed coaching inn near the parish church; and The Oakeley Arms, across the valley at Tan-y-Bwlch.

== Notable residents ==
- Edmund Prys (1542/3 – 1623), poet and biblical translator, born in nearby Llandecwyn, was rector between 1572 and 1624 and is buried inside St Twrog's Church.
- Morgan Llwyd (1619–1659) a Puritan Fifth Monarchist and Welsh language poet and prose author.
- Thomas Love Peacock (1785–1866) an English novelist and poet; lived at Maentwrog in 1810/1811, close friend of Percy Bysshe Shelley.
- Edward Stephen (1822–1885), bardic name Tanymarian, a Welsh musician, singer and composer of hymns and songs.
- Russell Grant (born 1951), astrologer, lives in nearby Tan-y-Bwlch, Maentwrog.
