= Tan-y-Bwlch railway station =

Railway station in Gwynedd, Wales

Tan-y-Bwlch
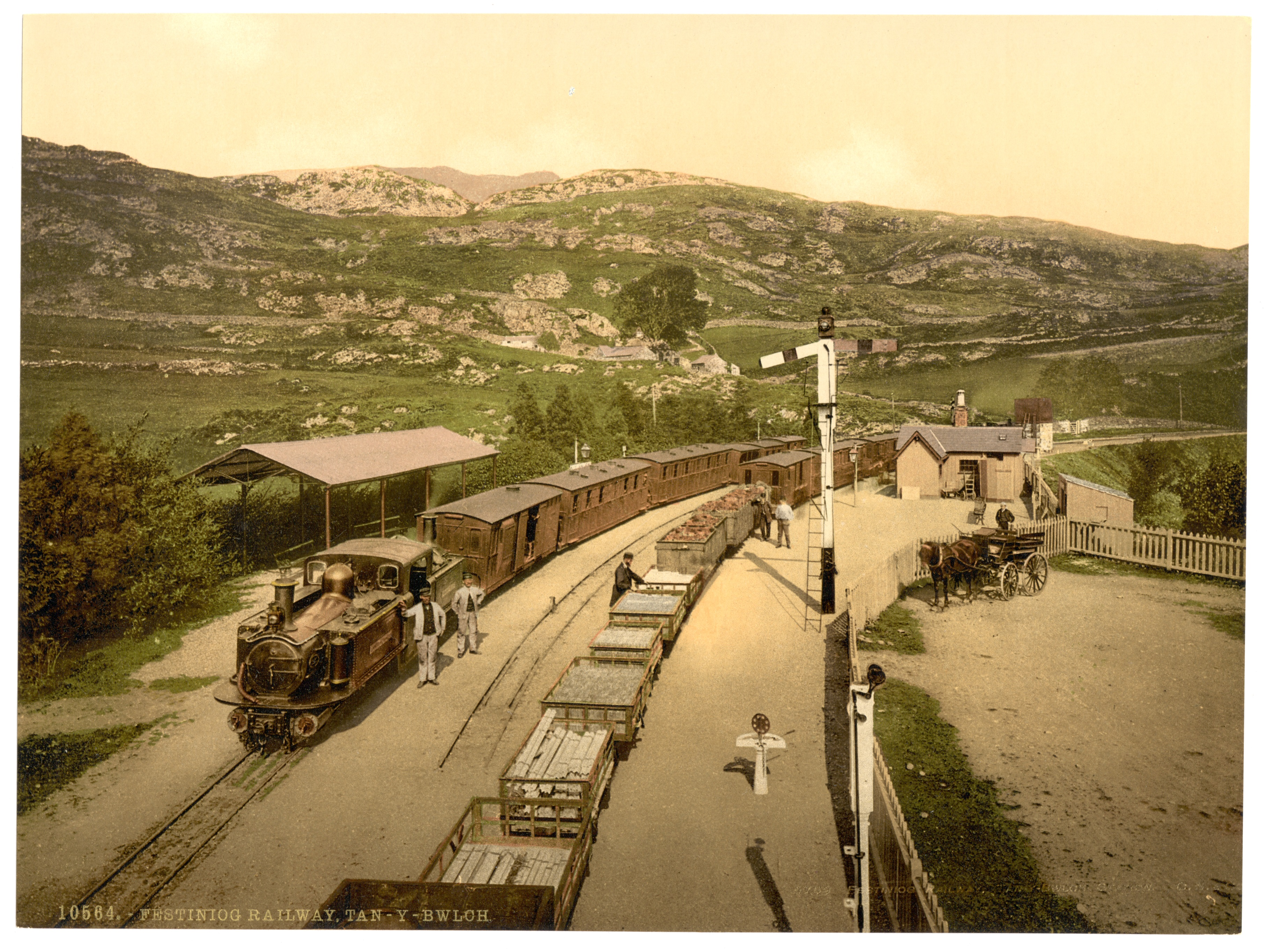
- Tan-y-Bwlch around 1900

General information
- Location: Tan-y-Bwlch, Gwynedd; Wales
- Coordinates: 52.95439°N 4.01112°W
- Grid reference: SH650415
- System: Station on heritage railway
- Owner: Festiniog Railway Company
- Manager: Ffestiniog Railway
- Platforms: 2

Key dates
- July 1873: Opened
- 15 September 1939: Closed
- 5 April 1958: Re-opened
Location

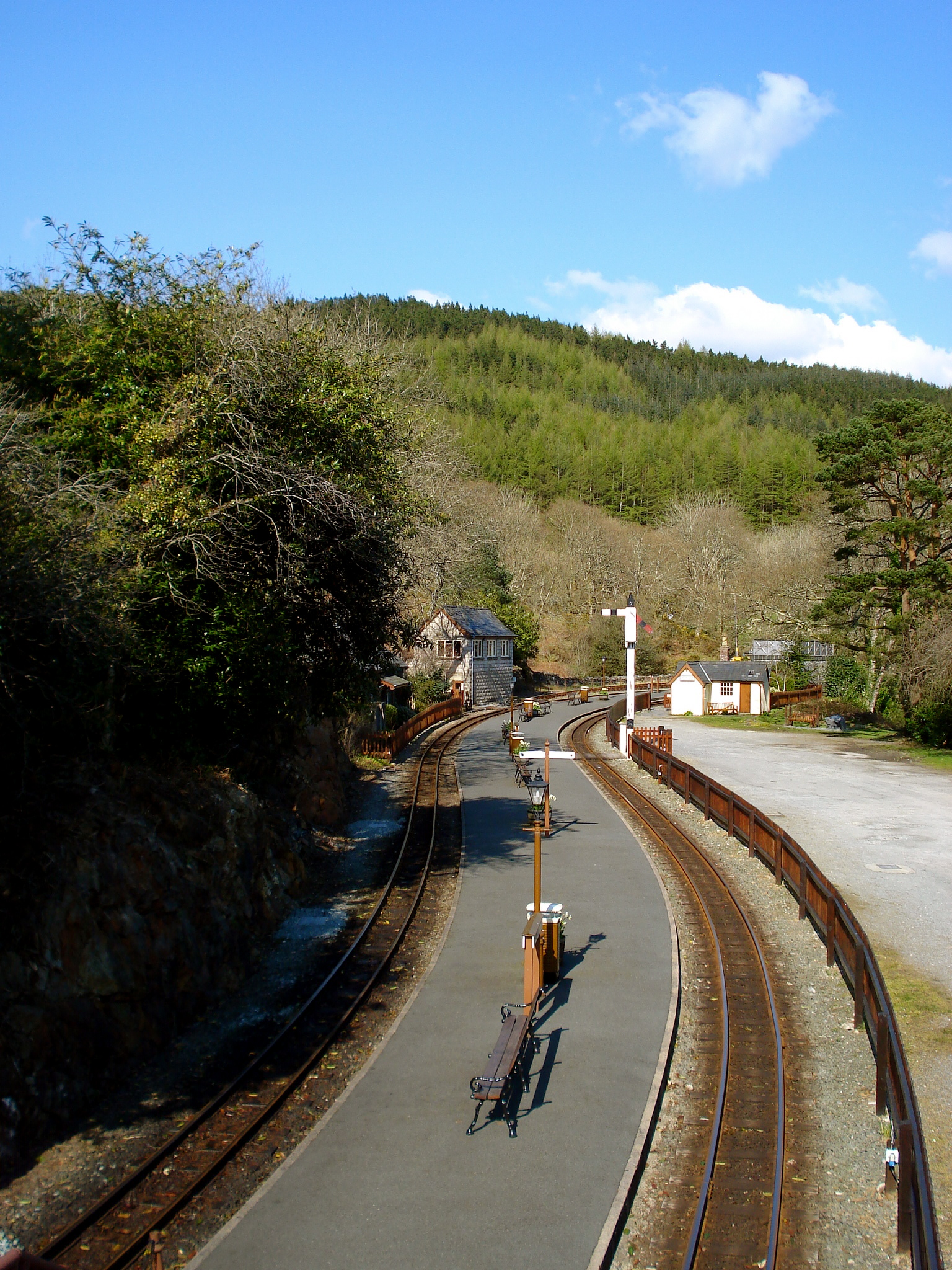
Tan-y-Bwlch in 2008

Tan-y-Bwlch railway station is the principal intermediate passenger station on the narrow gauge Ffestiniog Railway, which was built in 1836 to carry dressed slate from Blaenau Ffestiniog to Porthmadog for export by sea. The station lies off the B4410 former turnpike road from Maentwrog to Llanfrothen and Beddgelert, which the railway crosses on a fine cast-iron skew bridge (made at Boston Lodge foundry in 1854 and surmounted by 'gothic' balustrades).

Tan-y-Bwlch is at a height of 430 ft (130 m). and at a distance of just under 7.5 miles (12.1 km) from Porthmadog.

== Hafod y Llyn ==
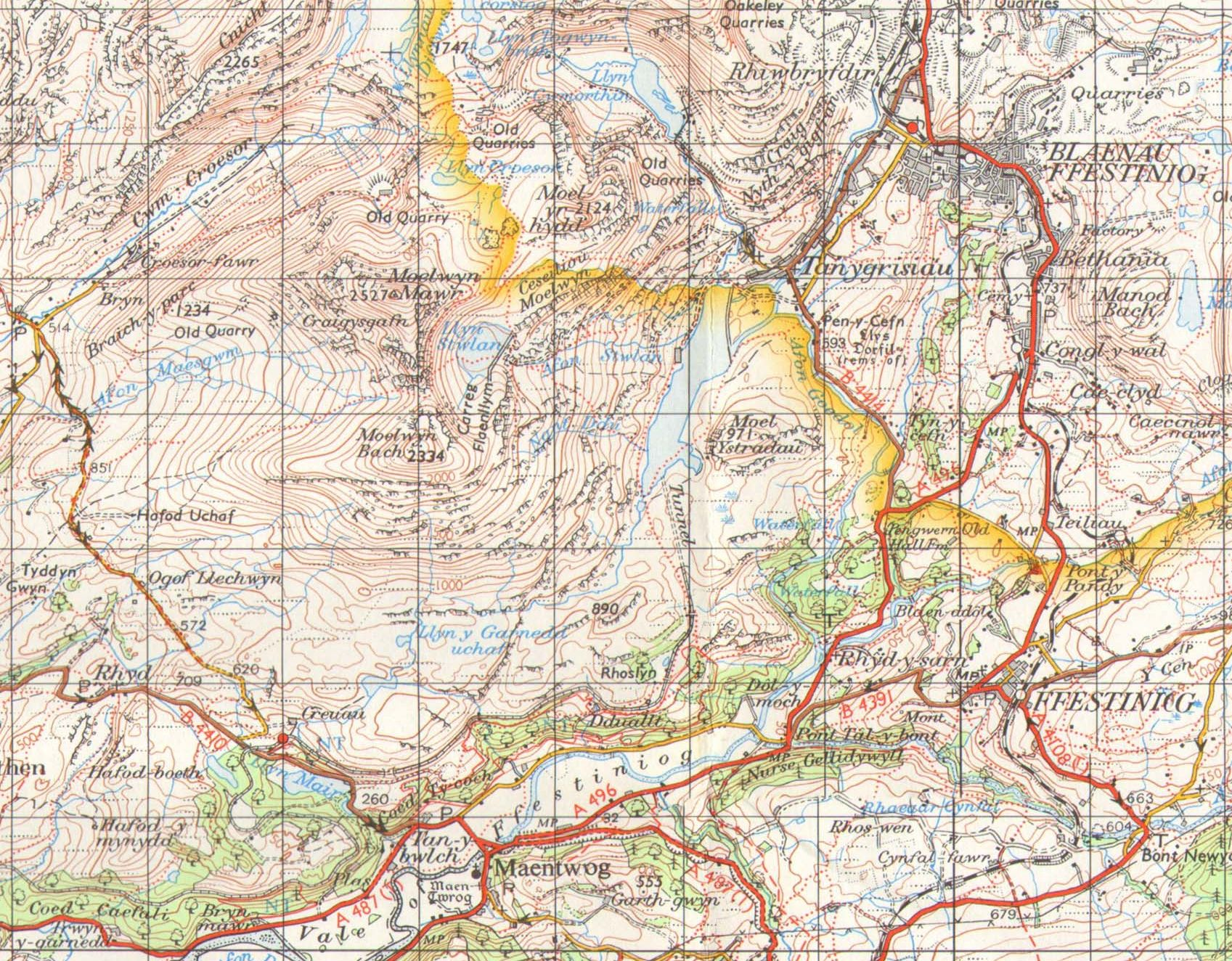
Extract from the 1962 OS one-inch map showing the section of line from Tan-y-Bwlch to Blaenau Ffestiniog

From 1863 until 1873, the only regular passing station for trains was at the former horse stage at Hafod y Llyn, located a few hundred yards down the route (southwest) from Tan-y-Bwlch. Hafod y Llyn opened for passengers on 6 January 1865 but was very difficult to access. It is just over 7 miles (11 km) from Porthmadog, and horses were changed there from 1836 to 1863, as well as at several other lineside stables. There is little to see of the location now, apart from a widening of the formation and a gate into the woods.

== History ==
Hafod y Llyn was replaced by the new station at Tan-y-Bwlch, which opened in July 1873 and closed to passengers on 15 September 1939.

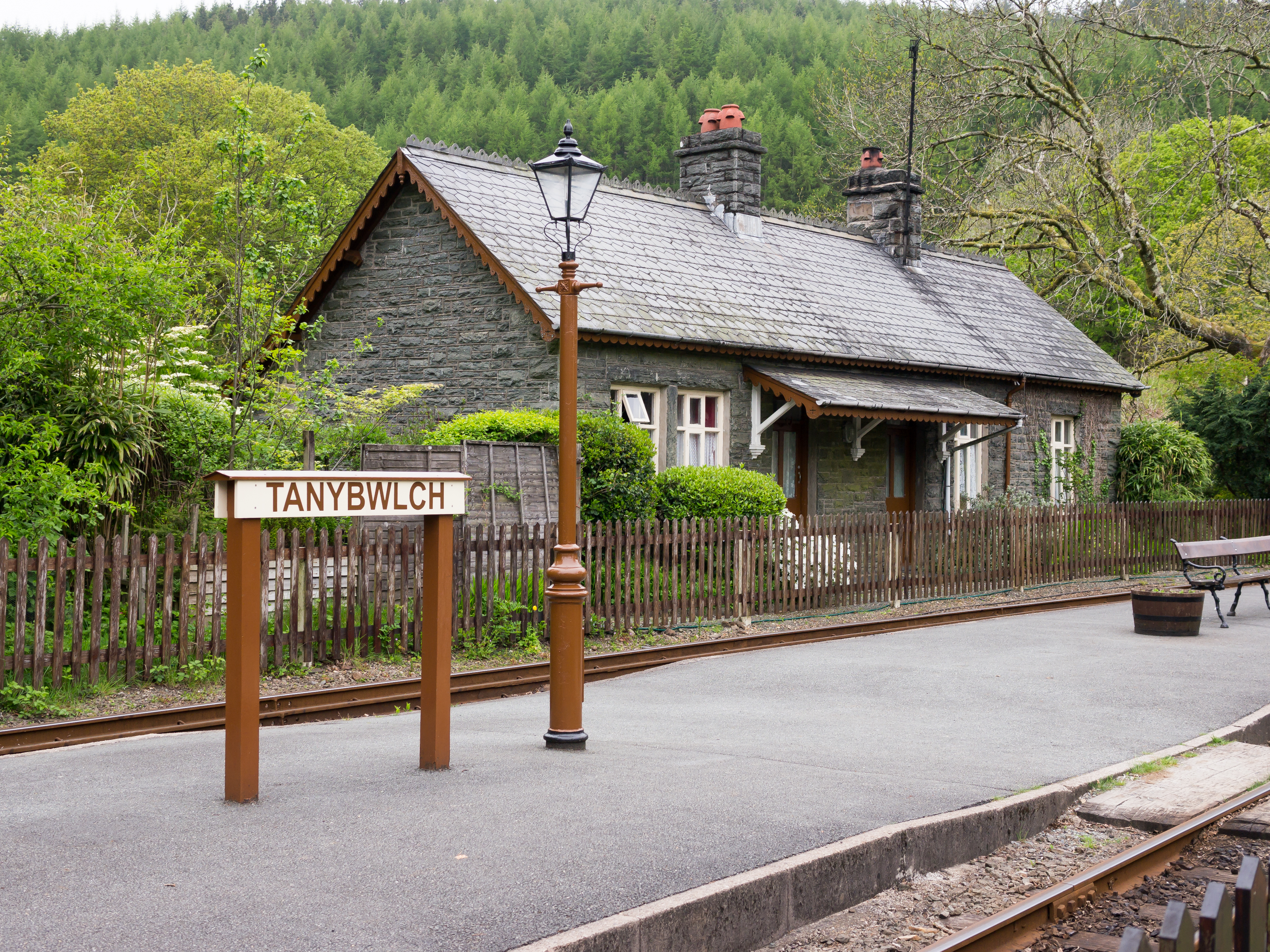
Tan-y-Bwlch station platform

Passenger service to Tan-y-Bwlch was resumed on 5 April 1958, and the station was the terminus of the railway until Dduallt was reopened in 1968. However, Tan-y-Bwlch continued as the main station for the upper part of the line for years afterwards, as Dduallt had very limited facilities and no road access.

== Station house ==
Mr and Mrs Will Jones have long been associated with Tan-y-Bwlch station. They lived in the station house from their marriage in 1929 to their retirement in 1968. In the 1930s and again in the 1950s and 1960s, the late Bessie Jones gained world-wide fame as the station-mistress wearing traditional Welsh costume and serving teas in the station house. Will Jones was a well-respected track man and passed on some of his skills to countless volunteers over the final 14 years of his employment.

Bessie Jones (played none too sympathetically by Louie Emery) even appeared in Michael Powell's 1935 thriller The Phantom Light, which opens with an extended scene at the Station featuring the film's heroine, played by Binnie Hale.

== Features and facilities ==
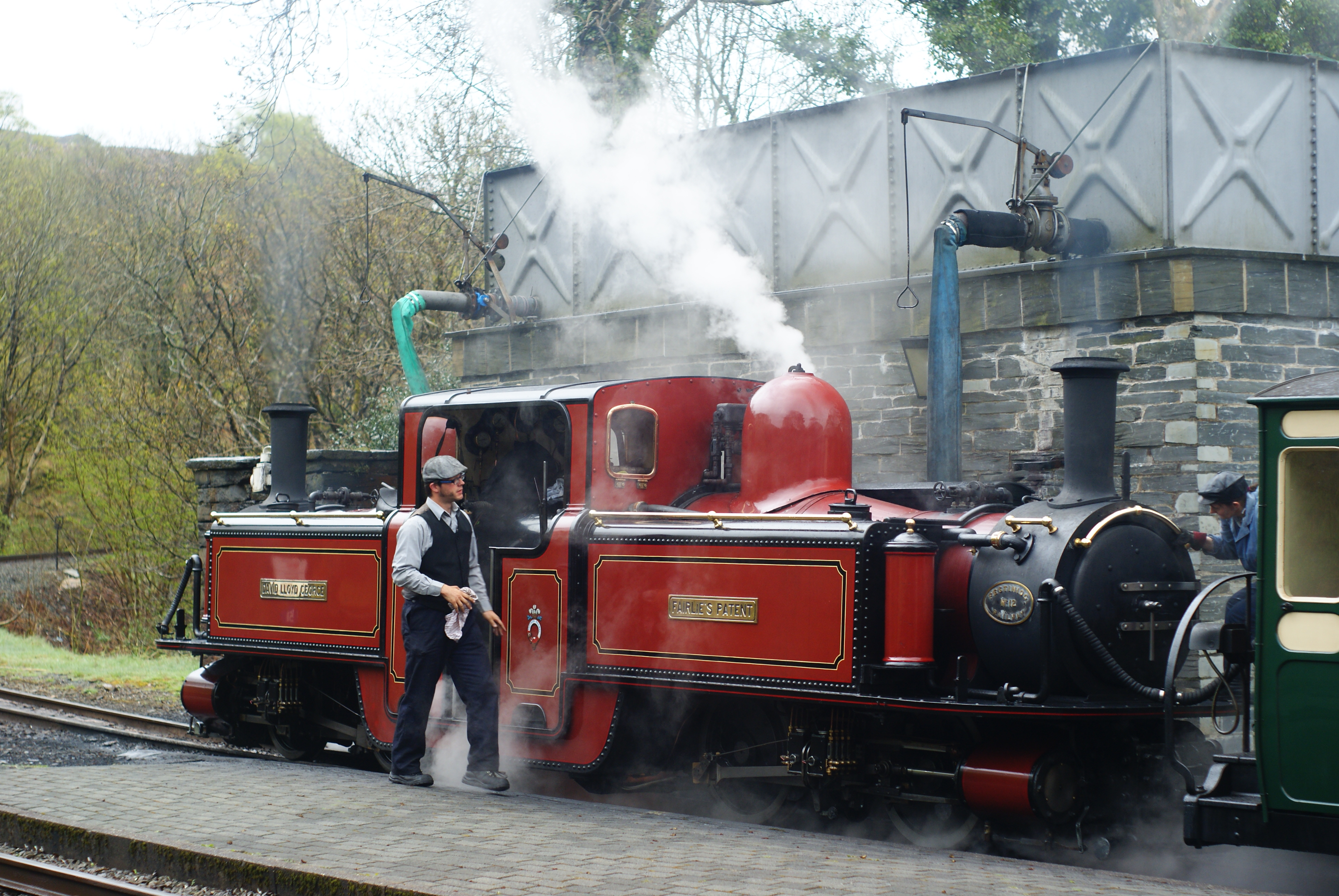
David Lloyd George at Tan-y-Bwlch, Gwynedd

In addition to the station house, Tan-y-Bwlch has an original wooden station building, a modern water tank (built in the early 1990s) and a 1970s building intended as a signal box (now containing the telephone exchange and the relays for the automatic crossing equipment).

The former stone built goods shed now serves as a shop, café and information centre, with modern extensions housing kitchens and passenger amenities. Car parking and a picnic area are provided. The present footbridge provides access to the central platform, and replaces an earlier bridge, some 15 yards (14 m) away, which was on the original Roman road and in turn had replaced a level crossing.

A feature of the station for many years was the long white paling fence observable in early photographs. This fence, 900 feet (270 m) long, was recreated in 1970 by volunteers. The 89 ten-foot panels were replaced in 1995, and in late 2006 the entire fence was in turn replaced, again by volunteers, using 74 similar twelve-foot panels and new gates – but creosoted, rather than painted. A reconstruction of 1999 is a static replica of the early-style slotted post semaphore signal that dominated the station in Victorian times. This early type of signal is no longer used on the Ffestiniog Railway, which now uses more modern equipment for train control.

Tourist facilities include a nature trail through woodlands leading to Llyn Mair ("Mary's Lake") as well as longer signposted walks. There is also a play area at the station.

== Services ==
Preceding station	Heritage railways	Following station
Plas Halt towards Porthmadog Harbour	Ffestiniog Railway	Campbell's Platform towards Blaenau Ffestiniog
