= Plas Tan y Bwlch =

Former country house in Gwynedd, Wales

Coordinates: 52.9462°N 4.0024°W

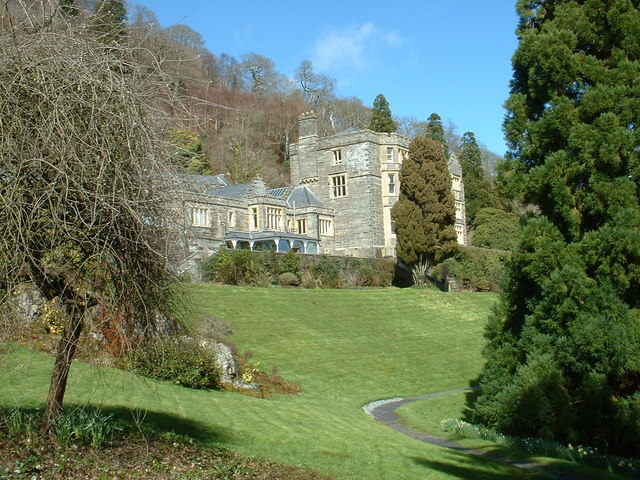
Plas Tan-y-bwlch

Plas Tan y Bwlch in Gwynedd, Wales, is a large 19th century house in Snowdonia National Park, North Wales. It is located approximately 6 miles (9.7 km) east of the coastal town of Porthmadog, overlooking the valley of the River Dwyryd and the village of Maentwrog.

It was the Snowdonia National Park environmental studies centre, administered by the National Park Authority. The centre provided courses about the Snowdonia National Park and the surrounding region of Wales.

In August 2024 the house was offered for sale at a guide price of £1.2 million.

== History ==
Plas Tan y Bwlch was built by the Oakeley family during the 19th century on the site of a first house probably built in the early 17th century. Additions designed by the Chester architect John Douglas were made to the house for W. E. Oakley in 1872. The nearby Oakeley Arms Hotel was also once part of the estate but was sold off in the early 20th century.

The Oakeley family owned a huge slate quarry in Blaenau Ffestiniog from which slates were carried to Porthmadog by the Ffestiniog Railway which passed through the estate.

Plas Tan y Bwlch is thought to be the first house in North Wales with electric lighting powered from its own hydro-electric station, which was commissioned in the 1890s. A pipeline from the nearby Llyn Mair fed water to a Pelton wheel, which was located in a small power house on the hillside immediately behind the house. It ceased to operate soon after 1928, when the public hydro-electric power station at Maentwrog began supplying the area. In June 2013 a new hydro-scheme, costing £420,000, and similarly tapping the water from Llyn Mair, was opened. The water falls 60 metres (200 ft) to the turbine, and the scheme is expected to meet most of the Plas' electricity needs.

The gardens of around 80 acres are designated Grade II* on the Cadw/ICOMOS Register of Parks and Gardens of Special Historic Interest in Wales.

== See also ==
- List of gardens in Wales
- Slate industry in Wales
