= Penrhyn railway station =

Railway station in Penrhyndeudraeth, Wales

Penrhyn
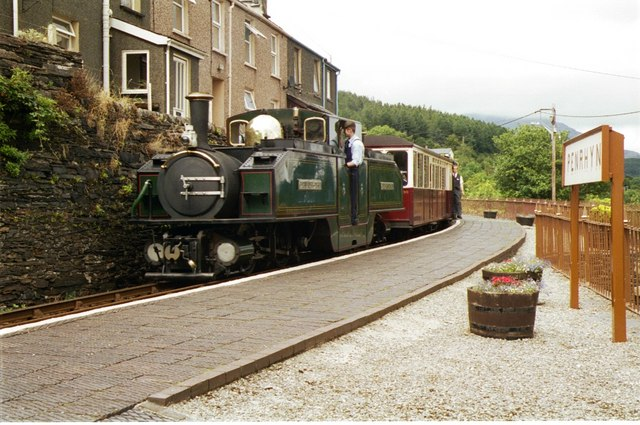
- Train entering Penrhyn station

General information
- Location: Penrhyndeudraeth, Gwynedd; Wales
- Coordinates: 52.93514°N 4.06484°W
- Grid reference: UfueytiuerueouriuwuruSH613395
- System: Station on heritage railway
- Owner: Festiniog Railway Company
- Manager: Ffestiniog Railway
- Platforms: 1

Key dates
- 6 January 1865: Opened
- 15 September 1939: Closed
- 12 November 1956: Special re-opening
- 20 April 1957: Re-opened

Listed Building – Grade II
- Feature: Penrhyndeudraeth Station, Ffestiniog Railway, Including Railed Railway Embankment Adjoining to the N
- Designated: 23 August 2002
- Reference no.: 26857
Location

Penrhyn railway station on the Ffestiniog Railway is located on a restricted site at Pen-y-Bwlch above the town of Penrhyndeudraeth (Penrhyndeudraeth means Headland between two beaches).

Beyond Penrhyn station, the railway crosses the A4085 Penrhyndeudraeth to Llanfrothen road on the line's only remaining gated and staffed level crossing. Because of the layout of the crossing, three privately owned terraced houses are between the two crossing gates.

== History ==
The station opened on 6 January 1865 at the commencement of passenger services, and was rebuilt in 1879 using components from the original Porthmadog Harbour Station—externally it has changed little since. Originally called Penrhyndeudraeth, during the 1870s the name was shortened to Penrhyn, in order to avoid confusion with the station on the Cambrian Railways coast line at the lower end of the town.

The station is at a height of 160 ft (50 m) and a distance of 3 miles 8 chains (5.0 km) from Porthmadog.

Penrhyn station closed to passenger traffic on 15 September 1939.

== Restoration ==
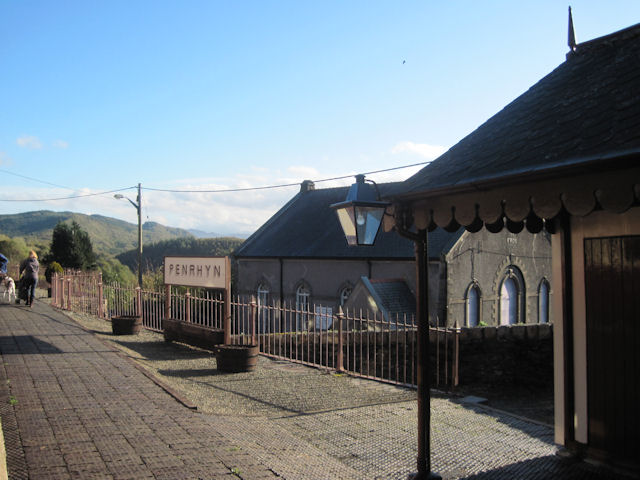
Penrhyn station platform

The station was specially reopened on Monday 12 November 1956 when the General Manager of British Railways (Western Region) Mr. K. W. C. Grand visited the Ffestiniog Railway and travelled from Porthmadog Harbour by the first passenger train to Penrhyn since 1939. The public passenger service was resumed on 20 April 1957.

Penrhyn served as a temporary terminus until the line was re-opened to Tan-y-Bwlch in 1958, a run round loop being squeezed into the site for the purpose. The loop at Penrhyn continued in use as a passing loop for timetabled trains until 1974.

Much of the station building is now occupied by the volunteers hostel which was officially opened in 1972. Complete renovation by volunteers was followed on 3 May 1992 by an official re-opening.

== Rhiw Goch ==
From 1975 Penrhyn was replaced for normal timetable purposes by a new passing loop at Rhiw Goch 4.2 miles (6.8 km) from Porthmadog. Although trains regularly stop for passing purposes, Rhiw Goch is not a passenger station, there is no public access and passengers are not permitted to alight there. However, tourist trains do on occasion terminate and reverse at Rhiw Goch.

== Services ==
Preceding station	Heritage railways	Following station
Minffordd towards Porthmadog Harbour	Ffestiniog Railway	Plas Halt towards Blaenau Ffestiniog
