= Vic Mitchell =

British railway preservationist (1934–2021)

- Born: Joseph Charles Victor Mitchell; 1 March 1934; Hampton, London
- Died: 18 January 2021 (aged 86); Middleton Lodge, Midhurst, West Sussex
- Occupations: Dentist, director, publisher, author
- Years active: 1951-2021
- Organization(s): Festiniog Railway, Middleton Press
- Spouse: Barbara
- Children: Two daughters

Joseph Charles Victor Mitchell (1 March 1934 – 18 January 2021) was a British dentist, inventor, and pioneer railway preservationist. He was the author or editor of, and publisher of, more than 600 books on railways in the United Kingdom and Europe.

== Early life and career ==
Joseph Charles Victor Mitchell was born on 1 March 1934 in Hampton, London to Wilfred and Amey Mitchell. His father was a dentist whilst his mother worked in photography. Mitchell developed an interest in railways at an early age, through collecting cigarette cards. The father of one of his schoolfriends was chief engineer at the 2 ft (610 mm) gauge Hampton & Kempton Waterworks Railway. When Mitchell was 9, a week was spent at Axminster, Devon. He spent most of that week riding the train on the Lyme Regis branch line. After the holiday, he spent time at his local railway station, Hampton, assisting the staff with their work and being rewarded by cab rides on steam locomotives, visits to the signal box and being allowed to issue tickets in the booking office. On his 10th birthday, the stationmaster was a guest at his party, the only guest Mitchell was allowed.

Mitchell married his wife Barbara in 1958, whilst doing his National Service in the Royal Air Force. He served at RAF St. Athan. They initially lived in a caravan parked in a nearby field, later moving into converted farm buildings. In December 1962, they moved to Midhurst, Sussex. Mitchell was a dentist. He had a practice at Petersfield, Hampshire. Mitchell and his wife Barbara had two daughters. In 1972, Mitchell invented a dentist's tool, the Illuminated Probing Handpiece, which won the United Kingdom a gold medal at the Exposition de Innovation in Geneva, Switzerland that November and was also shown on the BBC television programme Tomorrow's World. In 1974, he invented a composting toilet which was displayed at the Centre for Alternative Technology, Machynlleth, Powys. Mitchell was introduced to the Duke of Edinburgh when he visited. The toilet was exported to many Third World countries. From 1981 to 1984, Mitchell operated a pair of Fowler ploughing engines which he used to dredge lakes.

Their golden wedding anniversary in 2008 was celebrated by travelling on a special train on the Festiniog Railway, hauled by Palmerston and carrying the nameboard The Half Century. Barbara Mitchell died in September 2015. Mitchell died on 18 January 2021 at Middleton Lodge, Midhurst.

== Railway preservation ==
An advert in the January 1951 issue of The Railway Magazine caught Mitchell's eye. There was a proposal to preserve the Talyllyn Railway and readers were encouraged to write to publicity officer Tom Rolt to pledge their support. Mitchell and a classmate did so. In June, the pair travelled to Towyn, where their offer of help was accepted. A Daily Express reporter visited the line, and the three volunteers appeared in a photograph accompanying the story that was printed. Mitchell returned to the line shortly after with his parents. It was during this second visit that he met Allan Garraway for the first time. Mitchell is recorded as saying that Garraway "was to have a bearing on my life on a number of occasions subsequently".

An article in the January 1951 issue of Trains Illustrated magazine reported an application to the Ministry of Transport for the abandonment of the Festiniog Railway. It was announced in the March issue that a fund had been started by Leonard Heath Humphrys to preserve the line. Mitchell's loyalties were divided, but he decided that the Festiniog Railway was the better scheme of the two. He told Rolt of his decision to move to the Festiniog, only to be told that by Rolt there was "only room for one preserved railway in Great Britain". The inaugural meeting of those wishing to revive the Festiniog Railway was held at a Bristol college. Mitchell was one of the twelve people to attend. Other attendees included Garraway and former Southern Railway engineer Harold Holcroft. Mitchell was persuaded to join the management committee. By 1954, at the age of 20, he was a director of the Festiniog Railway in the capacity of sales officer. He performed many tasks on the railway, including acting as a fireman and guard. Mitchell helped the Festiniog Railway achieve its aim of reaching Blaenau Ffestiniog, from which it had been cut off by the construction of the Llyn Ystradau reservoir. The town council at Blaenau Ffestiniog was unsure whether the restoration of the Festiniog Railway would be a good thing. Mitchell persuaded them of its benefits, and that of having a joint station with British Rail. The Festiniog Railway reopened to Blaenau Festiniog in 1982.

== Author and publisher ==
In 1978, Mitchell published his first railway item, a route map of the London and South Western Railway. Thus Middleton Press was born, taking its name from his home at Middleton Lodge, Midhurst, West Sussex. In 1980, Mitchell was involved in a fundraiser for St. Mary Magdalene and St. Denys Church, Midhurst. An exhibition was held to mark the 25th anniversary of the closure to passengers of the Petersfield–Midhurst–Pulborough railway. One of the exhibitors was Keith Smith. Mitchell got into conversation with him and it was felt that there might be demand for a book on the railways in the area. Three publishers were approached but all rejected the idea. Mitchell spent £5,000 and published the book himself in 1981. Titled Branch Lines to Midhurst, it sold well and Mitchell recovered his investment. Initially, there was no intention to publish more titles, but Branch Lines to Horsham was published in 1982 and other books followed. By June 2018, Middleton Press had published 617 titles. Subjects covered include British railways, tram and trolleybus systems, as well as railways abroad.
