= Ffestiniog Railway =

Heritage railway in Wales

Coordinates: 52°55′27″N 4°07′36″W

Ffestiniog Railway Rheilffordd Ffestiniog
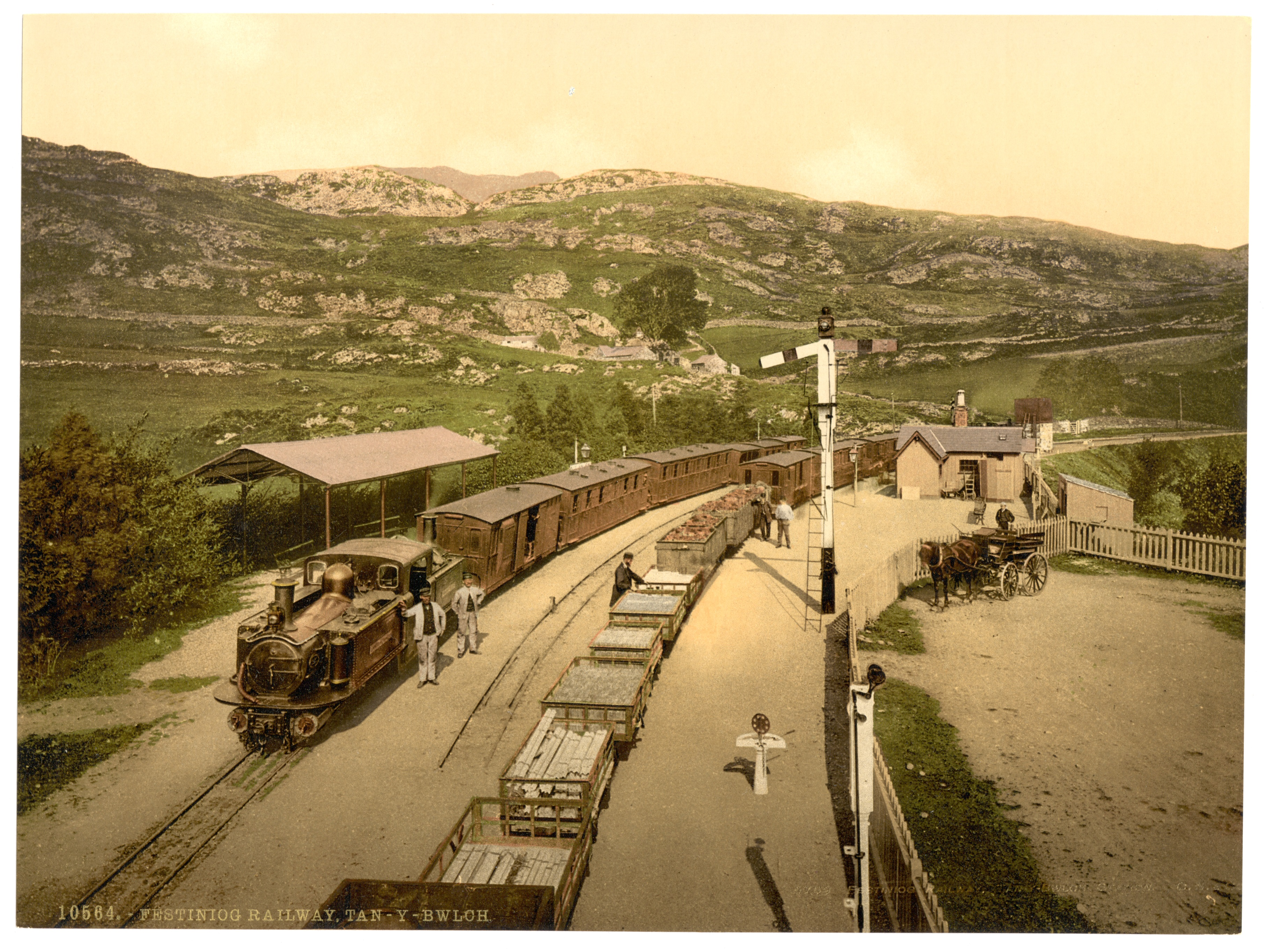
- Two trains passing at Tan-y-Bwlch, c. 1900
- Locale: Wales
- Terminus: Porthmadog

Commercial operations
- Name: Festiniog Railway Company
- Built by: Festiniog Railway Company
- Original gauge: 1 ft 11 1/2 in (597 mm)

Preserved operations
- Operated by: Festiniog Railway Company
- Stations: 10
- Length: 13.5 miles (21.7 km)
- Preserved gauge: 1 ft 11 1/2 in (597 mm)

Commercial history
- Opened: 20 April 1836
- Closed: 1 August 1946

Preservation history
- 1954: Restoration started at Boston Lodge works 20 September 1954
- 1955: Reopened from Portmadoc Harbour to Boston Lodge – 23 July
- 1956: Reopened to Minffordd
- 1957: Reopened to Penrhyn
- 1958: Reopened to Tan-y-Bwlch
- 1965: Start of the Deviation construction work
- 1968: Reopened to Dduallt
- 1974: Restoration of Rhiw Goch passing loop
- 1977: Reopened to Llyn Ystradau
- 1978: Reopened to Tanygrisiau
- 1982: Reopened to Blaenau Ffestiniog

UNESCO World Heritage Site
- Part of: The Slate Landscape of Northwest Wales
- Criteria: Cultural: ii, iv
- Reference: 1633-005
- Inscription: 2021 (44th Session)

The Ffestiniog Railway (Welsh: Rheilffordd Ffestiniog) is a heritage railway based on 1 ft 11 1/2 in (597 mm) narrow-gauge, in Gwynedd, Wales. It is a major tourist attraction located mainly within the Snowdonia National Park.

The railway is about 13 1/2 miles (21.7 km) long and runs from the harbour at Porthmadog to the slate mining town of Blaenau Ffestiniog, travelling through forested and mountainous terrain. The line is single track throughout with four intermediate passing places. The first mile of the line out of Porthmadog runs atop an embankment called the Cob, which is the dyke of the polder known as Traeth Mawr.

The Festiniog Railway Company, which owns the railway, is the oldest surviving railway company in the world. It also owns the Welsh Highland Railway, which was re-opened fully in 2011. The two railways share the same track gauge and meet at Porthmadog station, with occasional trains working the entire 40-mile (64 km) route from Blaenau Ffestiniog to Caernarfon.

== History ==
Festiniog Railway Act 1832
- Act of Parliament
- Parliament of the United Kingdom
- Long title: An Act for making and maintaining a Railway or Tramroad from a certain Quay at Portmadock, in the Parish of Yngs-cynhaiarn in the County of Carnarvon, to certain Slate Quarries called Rhiw-bryfder and Dyffws, in the Parish of Festiniog in the County of Merioneth.
- Citation: 2 & 3 Will. 4. c. xlviii

Dates
- Royal assent: 23 May 1832

Text of statute as originally enacted

The railway company is properly known as the "Festiniog Railway Company". The single F spelling is in the official title of the company in the local act, the Festiniog Railway Act 1832 (2 & 3 Will. 4. c. xlviii), that created the railway. It is the oldest surviving railway company in the world (although not the oldest working railway – a record that goes to the Middleton Railway, in Leeds), having been founded by the act of Parliament on 23 May 1832 with capital mostly raised in Dublin by Henry Archer, the company's first secretary and managing director. Most British railways were amalgamated into four large groups in 1921 and then into British Railways in 1948 but the Festiniog Railway Company, like most narrow-gauge railways, remained independent. In 1921, this was due to political influence, whereas in 1947 it was left out of British Railways because it was closed for traffic, despite vigorous local lobbying for it to be included.

Festiniog Railway Act 1869
- Act of Parliament
- Parliament of the United Kingdom
- Long title: An Act for enabling the Festiniog Railway Company to widen and improve their railway, and to raise further money; and for other purposes.
- Citation: 32 & 33 Vict. c. cxli

Dates
- Royal assent: 26 July 1869

Text of statute as originally enacted

Various important developments in the railway's early history were celebrated by the firing of rock cannon at various points along the line. Cannon were fired, for instance, to mark the laying of the first stone at Creuau in 1833, the railway's opening in 1836, and the opening of the Moelwyn Tunnel in 1842. The passing of the later Festiniog Railway Act 1869 (32 & 33 Vict. c. cxli) for the railway also saw cannon celebrations, but on this occasion, a fitter at Boston Lodge, who was assisting with firing, lost the fingers of one hand in an accident.

=== Horse and gravity operation ===
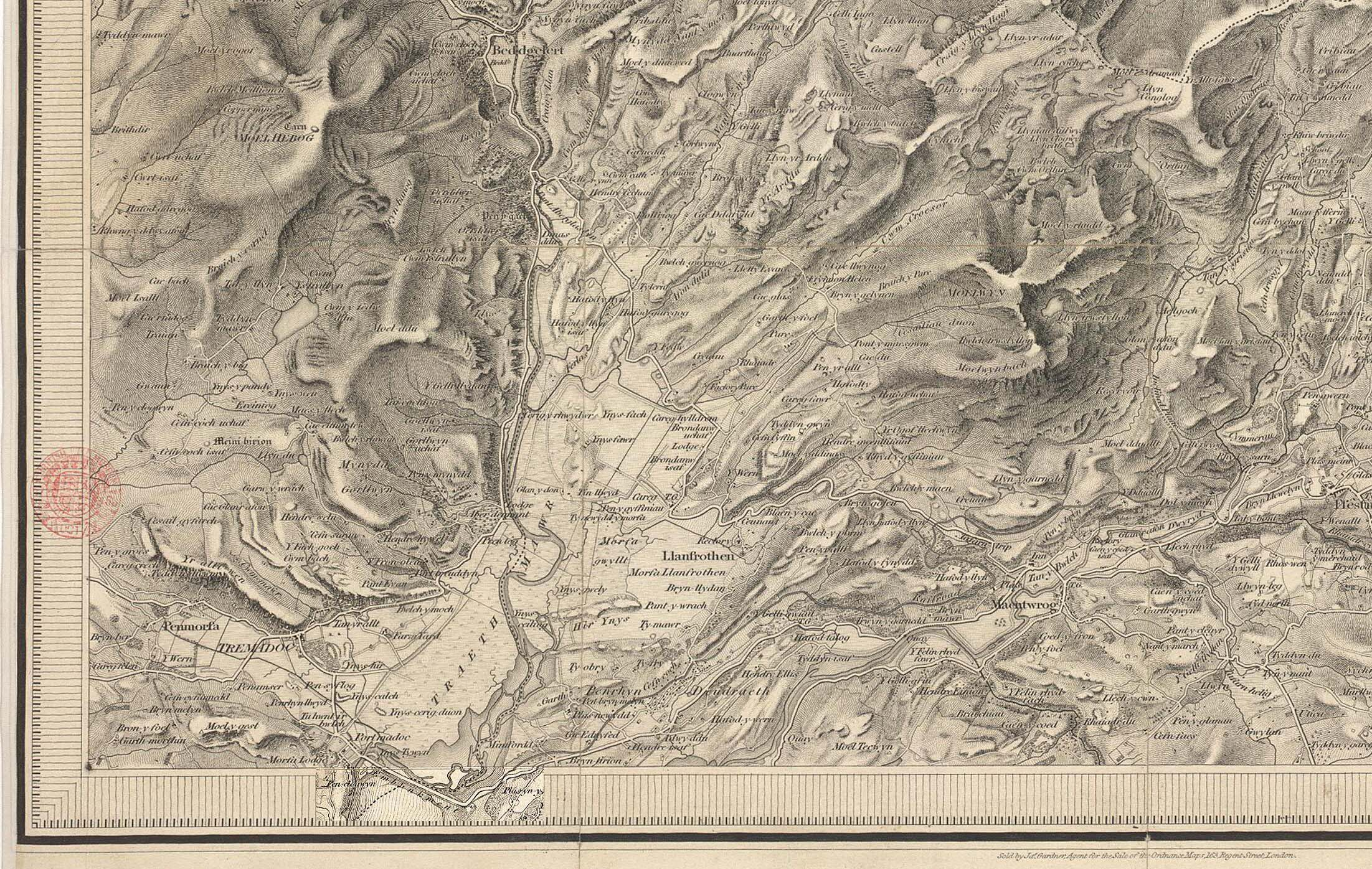
One-inch map of the route of the Ffestiniog Railway about 1840, showing the inclined plane that was used until the Moelwyn tunnel was built in 1842

The line was constructed between 1833 and 1836 to transport slate from the quarries around the inland town of Blaenau Ffestiniog to the coastal town of Porthmadog where it was loaded onto ships. The railway was graded so that loaded wagons could be run by gravity downhill all the way from Blaenau Ffestiniog to the port. The empty wagons were hauled back up by horses, which travelled down in special 'dandy' wagons. To achieve this continuous grade (about 1 in 80 for much of the way), the line followed natural contours and employed cuttings and embankments built of stone and slate blocks without mortar. Prior to the completion in 1842 of a long tunnel through a spur in the Moelwyn Mountain, the slate trains were worked over the top via inclines (designed by Robert Stephenson), the site of which can still be seen although there are few visible remnants.

Up to six trains daily were operated in each direction and a printed timetable was published on 16 September 1856 by Charles Easton Spooner who, following his father, served as Manager and Clerk for 30 years. It shows departures from the Quarry Terminus (later referred to as Dinas, sometimes as Rhiwbryfdir or Rhiw) at 7:30, 9:28, 11:16, 1:14, 3:12 and 5:10. Trains waited ten minutes at the intermediate stations called Tunnel Halt, Hafod y Llyn and Rhiw Goch. The fastest journey time from Quarry Terminus to Boston Lodge was 1 hour 32 minutes, including three stops. From Boston Lodge, the slate wagons were hauled to and from Porthmadog harbour by horses. Up trains took nearly six hours from Boston Lodge to the Quarry Terminus and each train ran in up to four sections, each hauled by a horse and comprising eight empty slate wagons plus a horse dandy. This timetable gave a maximum annual capacity of 70,000 tons of dressed slate. Two brakesmen travelled on each down train, controlling the speed by the application of brakes as needed. At passing loops, trains passed on the right and this continues to be a feature of Ffestiniog Railway operation.

There is evidence for tourist passengers being carried as early as 1850 without the blessing of the Board of Trade, but these journeys would also observe the timetable.

Hafod y Llyn was replaced by Tan y Bwlch around 1872. Dinas (Rhiw) Station and much of that branch is now all but buried under slate waste; the rest of the Dinas branch line was removed about 1954–55. Occasional confusion arises because places named Hafod y Llyn Isaf and Dinas also exist on the Welsh Highland Railway, albeit 10 miles (16 km) or more to the northwest of those on the FR.

=== Steam and gravity operation ===
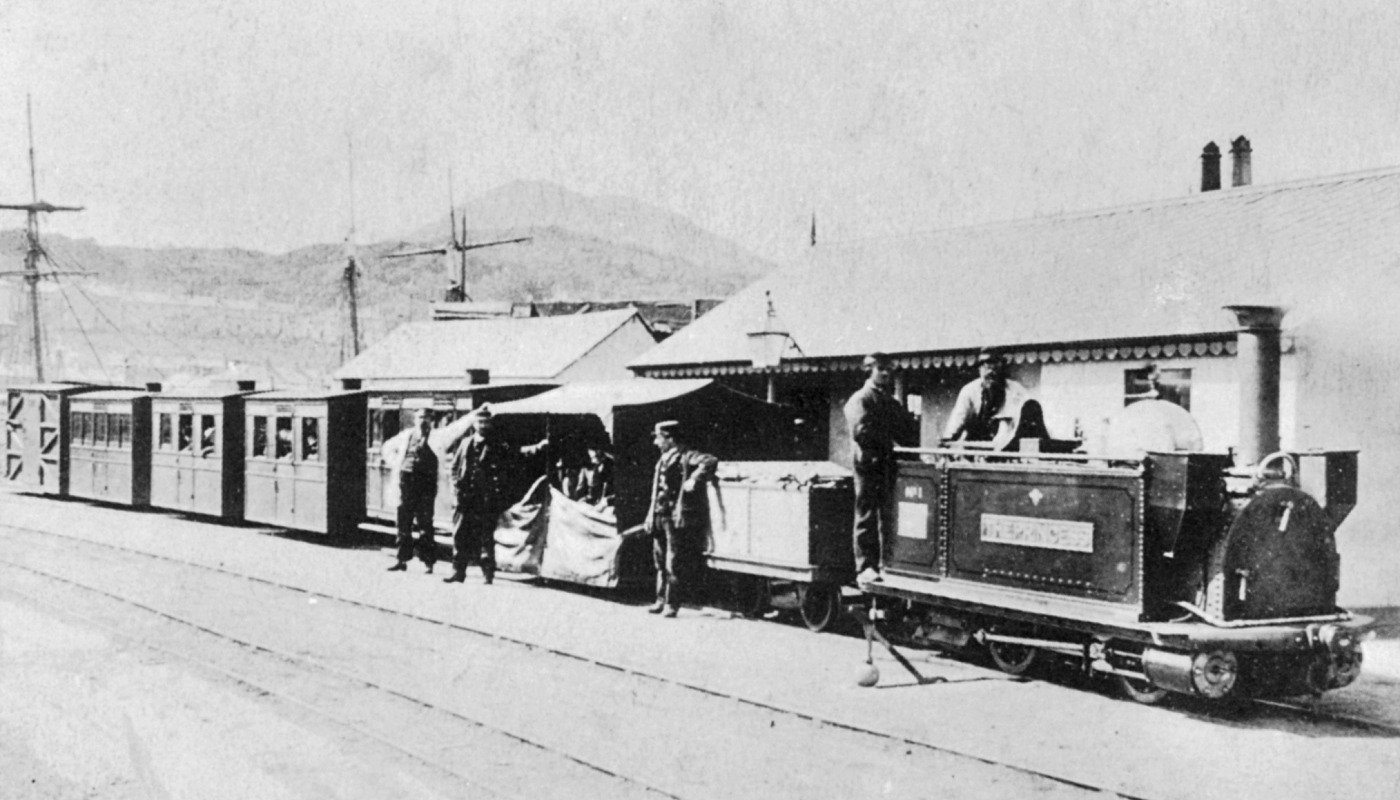
George England locomotive The Princess with passenger train at Porthmadog harbour station circa 1870

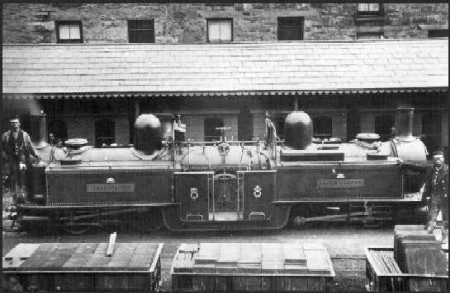
Double Fairlie locomotive James Spooner

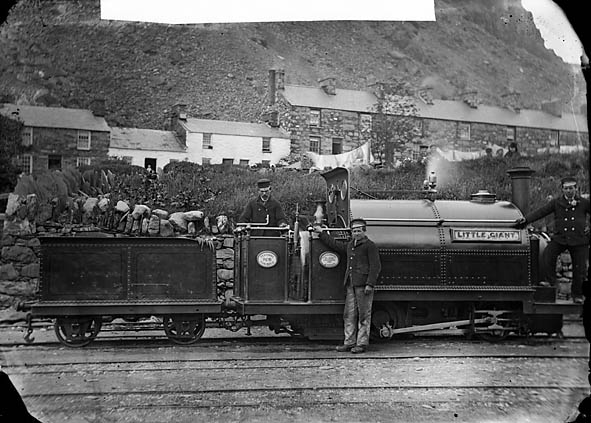
Little Giant at Duffws, circa 1875

During the late 1850s it became clear that the line was reaching its operational capacity, while the output of the Blaenau Ffestiniog slate quarries continued to rise. In 1860, the board of the company began to investigate the possibility of introducing steam locomotives to increase the carrying capacity of the railway. Although narrow-gauge steam locomotives had been tried before this, very few had been built to so narrow a gauge. In 1862 the company advertised for manufacturers to tender to build the line's first locomotives. In February 1863, the bid of George England and Co. was accepted and production of the first locomotives was begun.

The first of these locomotives, Mountaineer was delivered to Porthmadog on 18 July 1863, followed a few days later by The Princess. After a number of trials and some modifications (notably the addition of domes) to the locomotive, the first official train ran on 23 October 1863. These steam locomotives of the 0-4-0 type allowed much longer slate trains to be run and this also enabled the official introduction of passenger trains in 1865: the Ffestiniog was the first narrow-gauge railway in Britain to carry passengers. In 1869, the line's first double Fairlie articulated locomotive was introduced and these double-ended machines have since become one of the most widely recognised features of the railway.

Down trains continued to run entirely by gravity but faster up journeys and longer trains increased line capacity. A new timetable dated October 1863 shows six departures daily from each terminus at two-hour intervals, starting at 7:00 am and taking 1 hour 50 minutes including stops (totalling 20 minutes) at Tanygrisiau, Hafod-y-Llyn and Penrhyn. Trains passed only at Hafod-y-Llyn (from 1872 Tan-y-Bwlch). When passenger services started, the usual practice was for locomotive-hauled up trains to consist of loaded general goods and mineral wagons, followed by passenger carriages, followed by empty slate wagons with brakesmen. Down trains were run in up to four separate (uncoupled) portions: loaded slate wagons, goods wagons, passenger carriages and the locomotive running light. This unusual and labour-intensive method of operation was highly dangerous, at least as far as passengers were concerned; consequently, the down passenger and goods portions were combined into a single train headed by the locomotive.

The loaded slate trains continued to operate by gravity until the end of passenger services in 1939. Slate trains eventually became very long – trains of less than eighty slate wagons carried two brakesmen but over eighty wagons (and this became common) required three brakesmen. About one wagon in every six was equipped with a brake, the others being unbraked. Trains continued to pass at Tan-y-Bwlch and, to a lesser extent, at Minffordd. The Summer timetable for 1900 had nine trains daily in each direction and trains had been accelerated to one hour from Porthmadog to Duffws including stops at Minffordd, Penrhyn, Tan-y-Bwlch, Dduallt (request), Tanygrisiau, Blaenau (LNWR) and Blaenau (GWR). Speeds in excess of 40 mph (64 km/h) were then normal.

The original passenger coaches (some of which survive) were small four-wheeled vehicles with a very low centre of gravity, which led to them being nicknamed 'bug boxes'. In 1872, the FR introduced the first bogie carriages to operate in Britain, Nos 15 and 16, which were also the first iron-framed bogie coaches in the world and are still in service. The continuous vacuum brake was installed in 1893. The line was fully signalled with electric telegraph and staff and ticket working. Electric Train Staff instruments were introduced in 1912 and they continue in use to the present day.

=== Decline of slate and development of tourism ===
By the 1920s, the demand for slate as a roofing material dropped owing to the advent of newer materials and to the loss of the overseas trade during World War I. As a result, the railway suffered a gradual decline in traffic.

In 1921, the Aluminium Corporation at Dolgarrog in the Conwy Valley bought for £40,000 (£1,690,000 in 2025), a controlling interest in the FR and Henry Jack became chairman, the FR company's financial administration moving to Dolgarrog. Jack was also chairman of the new Welsh Highland Railway. He was instrumental in getting government backing for its completion on the understanding that the FR and the WHR would be jointly managed from Porthmadog, with maintenance undertaken at Boston Lodge and with other economies of scale. In 1923, the FR line was joined to the WHR line at a station called Portmadoc New. The Welsh Highland line was almost totally dependent on tourism, but this proved slow to develop for several reasons: two slumps in the early 1920s and early 1930s; the rise of road traffic including charabancs; and the unreliability of the railway with its (even then) ancient carriages and increasingly decrepit locomotives.

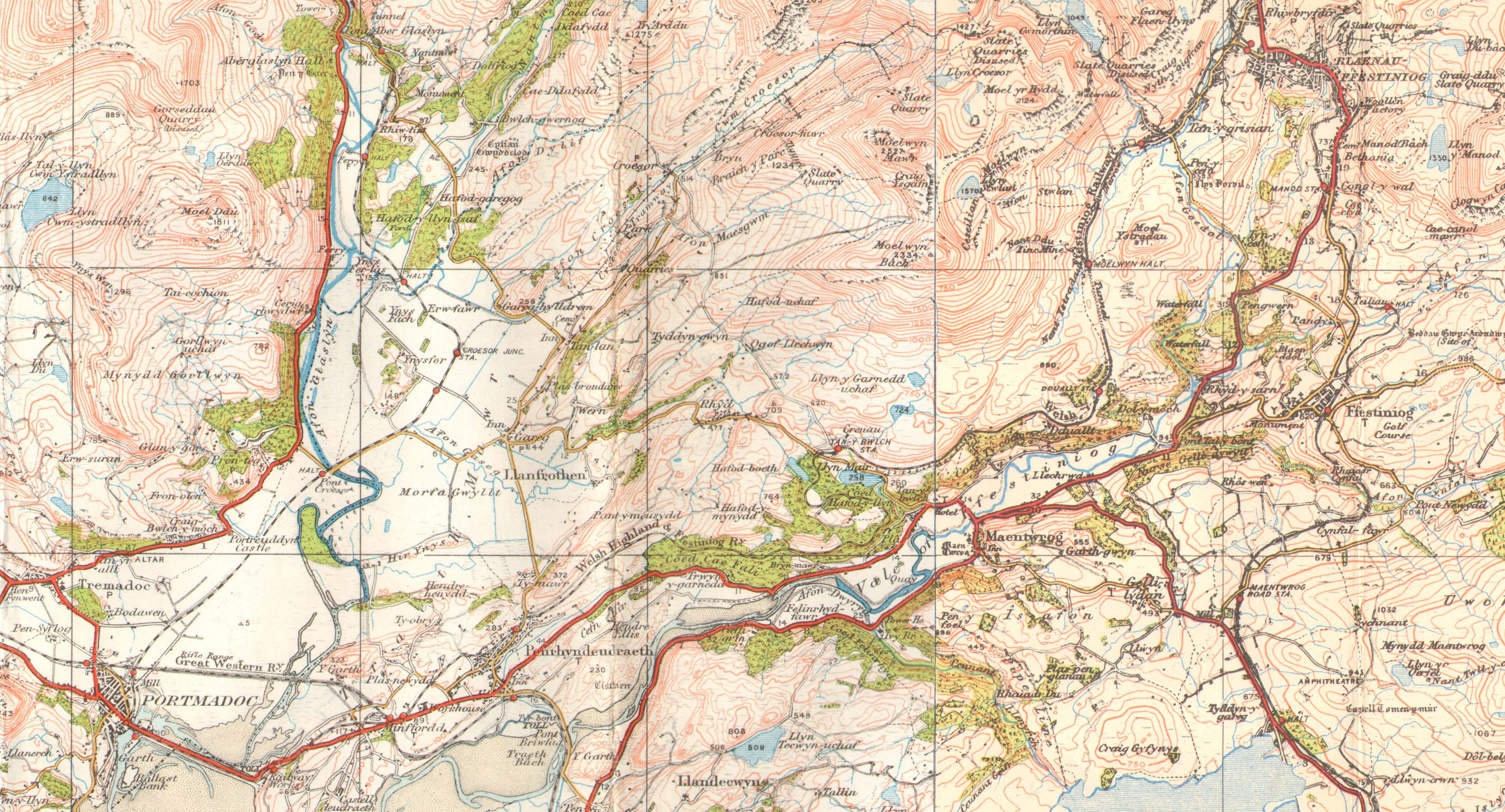
Ordnance Survey one-inch map from 1921-2 showing the route of the 'Welsh Highland & Ffestiniog Rly'

Light railway operation was being introduced on the FR and WHR to cut operating overheads. In 1923, to gain additional expertise in this, Colonel H. F. Stephens was appointed as part-time engineer to both companies. Stephens became chairman and managing director of both companies in 1924. When the WHR was taken into receivership in 1927, Colonel Stephens was appointed as receiver for the WHR and financial administration of both companies moved to Tonbridge in Kent. The fortunes of the WHR, despite great efforts, failed to improve and it became bankrupt in 1933. To protect their investments, the joint owners of both companies arranged for the WHR to be leased by the FR. However the WHR losses continued with the loss of the Moel Tryfan slate traffic in 1935, and it closed to passengers at the end of the 1936 season and to goods in 1937.

The FR continued to operate its slate traffic, a workmen's train on weekdays throughout the year and a summer tourist passenger service. Ordinary passenger services ceased on the FR on 15 September 1939, shortly after the outbreak of World War II. The workmen's passenger service ran for the last time on Saturday, 16 September 1939. Slate trains were from then onwards operated three days each week but gravity operation was discontinued. Slate traffic ceased on 1 August 1946, apart from the section from Duffws to the North Western yard through Blaenau Ffestiniog town centre, which was leased on 7 October 1946 to the quarry owners. This provided the railway company, which retained the services of a resident manager at Porthmadog, with a small income throughout the moribund years.

The original act of Parliament which permitted the building of the line made no specific provision for its closure or abandonment. Although the main line had ceased functioning, the company could not dismantle the railway, so the track and infrastructure were left in place. An amending act of Parliament could have been sought to repeal the old one, but the company did not have the money. However, without maintenance, the line soon became overgrown and unusable.

=== Restoration ===
From 1949, various groups of rail enthusiasts attempted to revitalise the railway. In 1951, railway enthusiast Alan Pegler was approached by friends to buy and clear the outstanding debt on the derelict Ffestiniog Railway, to enable its purchase. Lent £3,000 by his father, he and the volunteers obtained control of the company on 24 June 1954. Pegler was appointed the new company's first chairman, with the objective to operate the railway as a tourist attraction and gradually restore the line to working order. The first meeting of the revivalists was held at a Bristol college on 8 September. Amongst the twelve in attendance were Allan Garraway, Harold Holcroft and Vic Mitchell. Mitchell would later be appointed a director of the company. Pegler later released complete control of the company without any personal financial gain to the Ffestiniog Railway Trust, which still owns and runs the railway today.

In 1954, the Central Electricity Generating Board (CEGB) built the Ffestiniog Pumped Storage Scheme. This included a new reservoir, Llyn Ystradau which flooded a mile of the line north of the Moelwyn Tunnel. In 1972, after the second-longest court case in British legal history, the Festiniog Railway Company obtained compensation for the loss of its route. Two years later, the case influenced the writing of the Land Compensation Act 1973.

On 18 August 1954, Colonel McMullen of the Ministry of Transport, Railways Inspectorate inspected the line from Blaenau Ffestiniog to Porthmadog, accompanied by Pegler, several directors and other supporters. Restoration began on 20 September 1954 when Morris Jones, the foreman fitter who had last worked for the railway in March 1947, rejoined the staff. Jones worked to complete the rebuilding of the locomotive Prince which he had been working on when the railway closed. He was joined at Boston Lodge works by two volunteers, Bill Harvey and Allan Garraway. The completion of sixty years service with the FR by Robert Evans (for almost 25 years as Manager) was marked on 6 November 1954 and a special train was run from Minffordd to Porthmadog to celebrate the occasion and convey Evans, his wife, Alan Pegler (company chairman) and guests en route to a clock presentation ceremony. Evans continued in service as Manager until his retirement on 1 June 1955 when Garraway was appointed as Manager.

The first public passenger train from Porthmadog to Boston Lodge ran on 23 July 1955. Prince returned to service on 3 August 1955. After extensive boiler repairs, Double Fairlie Taliesin returned to service on 4 September 1956. The passenger service was extended to Minffordd on 19 May 1956, to Penrhyn on 5 June 1957 and to Tan-y-Bwlch on 5 April 1958. Increasing traffic put severe demands on the track – over 7 miles (11 km) had been reopened in four years. A long period of consolidation, rolling stock restoration and track renewal followed before the extension to Dduallt on 6 April 1968. This extension was celebrated on 28 May 1968 by the re-introduction of the Ffestiniog Railway Letter Service.

=== The Llyn Ystradau Deviation ===
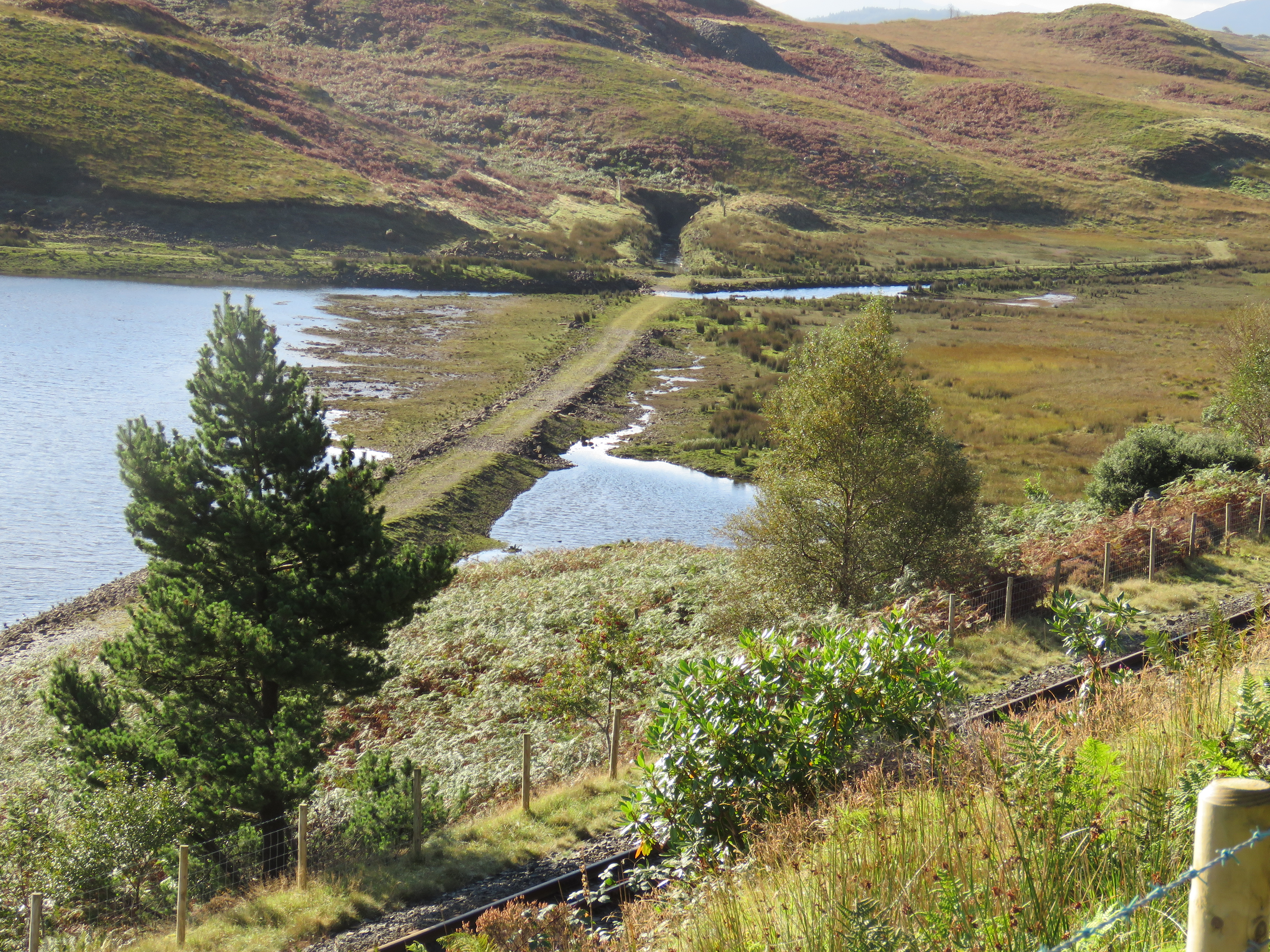
The old route of the Ffestiniog Railway towards the northern portal of the first Moelwyn Tunnel. It was permanently blocked with a concrete/stone plug during the completion of Llyn Ystradau in the late 1950s/early 1960s. The replacement FR line is in the foreground.

Between 1965 and 1978, the Ffestiniog Railway Deviation, a 2 1/2-mile (4 km) long diversionary route, was constructed between Dduallt and Tanygrisiau to avoid the Ffestiniog hydro-electric power station and its reservoir (Llyn Ystradau). The Deviation (this is the conventional name for such railway works) was built mostly by volunteers. At the southern end is the Dduallt spiral formation which is unique on a public railway in the United Kingdom. Including a bridge, it was constructed entirely by volunteers, and gains an initial height rise of 35 feet (10.7 m) in order (after a further one mile (1.6 km) of new volunteer-built railway and a new tunnel) to clear the flooded track bed north of the former Moelwyn tunnel, which is plugged near its usually-submerged northern end. Between Dduallt and the old tunnel, parts of the old railway formation can be clearly seen below the new route.

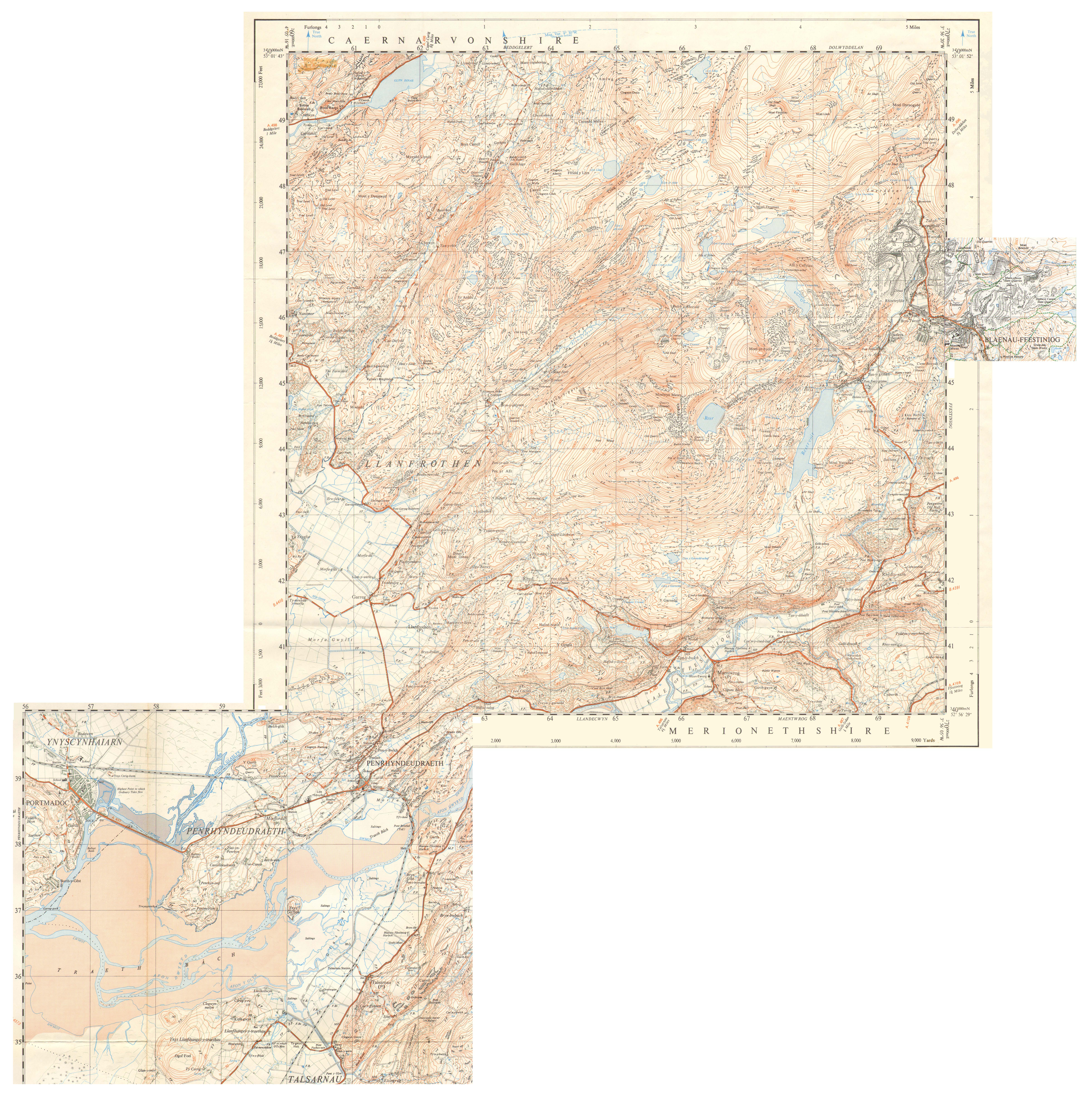
Ordnance Survey 1:25,000 composite map showing the Ffestiniog railway about 1953, after the construction of the Llyn Ystradau reservoir flooded a section of the route, but before the deviation was built to carry the railway around the west bank of the reservoir

The new 310-yard (280 m) tunnel was constructed between 1975 and 1977 by three Cornish tin mining engineers with a small team of employees. It had to be blasted through a granite spur of the Moelwyn mountain. The tunnel plant included stone crushing and grading equipment, which produced track ballast and other aggregates from the spoil for use on the railway. Before it opened to rail traffic, the new tunnel had to be lined throughout its length with liquid cement reinforced with steel mesh in a process called 'shotcreting'.

From 26 May 1975, and over two summers, a pull and push service, officially called The Shuttle, powered by diesel locomotive Moel Hebog with carriage 110, was operated from Dduallt to Gelliwiog, to enable tourists to experience the Deviation route before the new Moelwyn Tunnel was opened.

North of the new tunnel is a long stretch of track along the west bank of the new reservoir. On 25 June 1977, full-length passenger trains first ran from Dduallt through the new tunnel to a now-dismantled temporary terminus known as Llyn Ystradau. That station was alongside Llyn Ystradau but, because it was on Central Electricity Generating Board land without public access, passengers could not leave the station other than by train.

The remaining section included some specialised engineering work at its summit (668 feet (204 m)) where the new line passes over the power station pipelines. This was followed by two public road crossings with automatic signalling, on the FR's only reverse or down gradient, to rejoin the old route in Tanygrisiau station (640 feet (195 m)), which was reopened on 24 June 1978.

The largely volunteer group building the Deviation was officially called the Civil Engineering Group, but its members were popularly known (and are still remembered) as the "Deviationists", who completed an enormous task over 13 years.

=== Project Blaenau ===
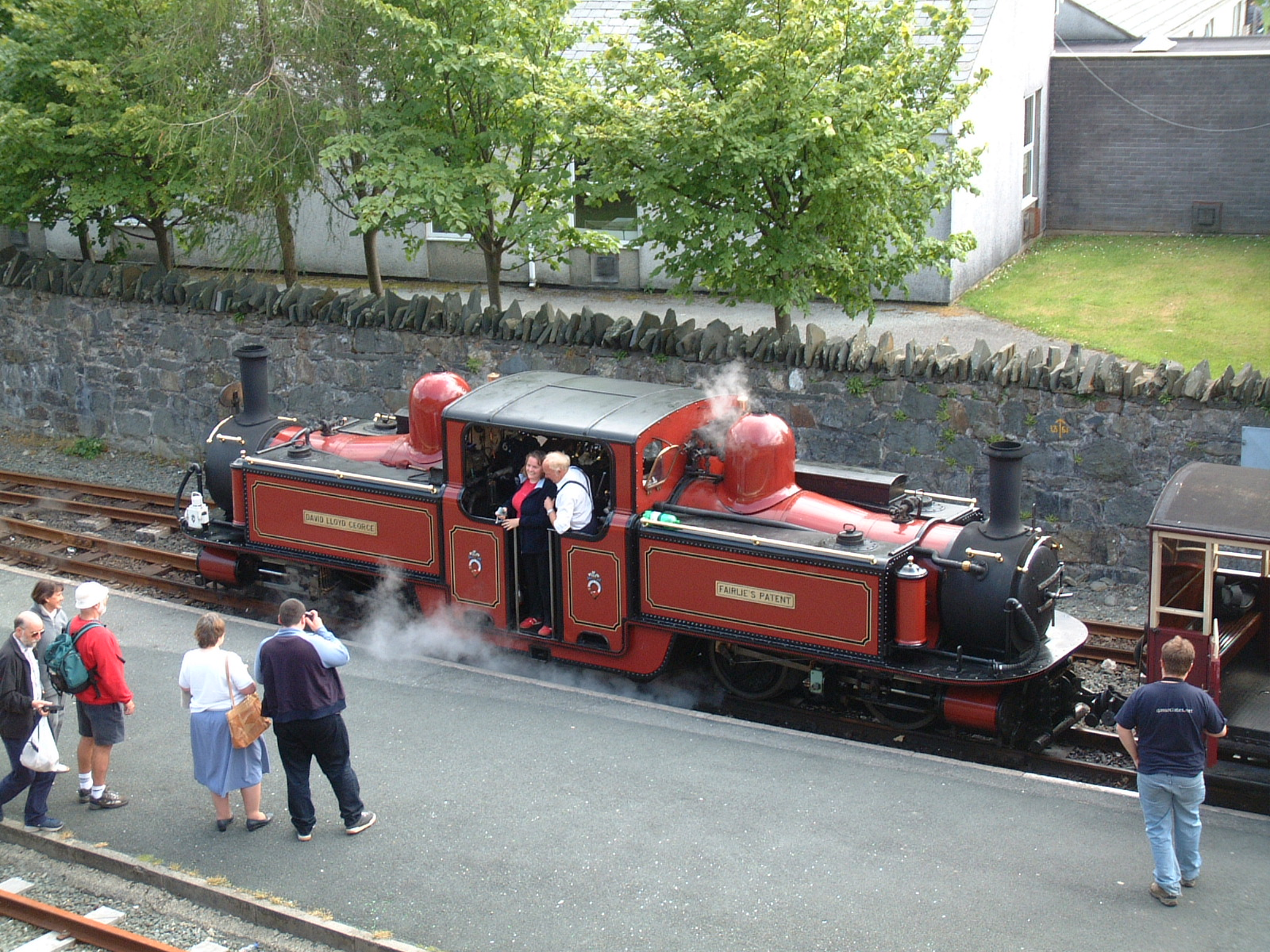
Double Fairlie locomotive David Lloyd George at Blaenau Ffestiniog station

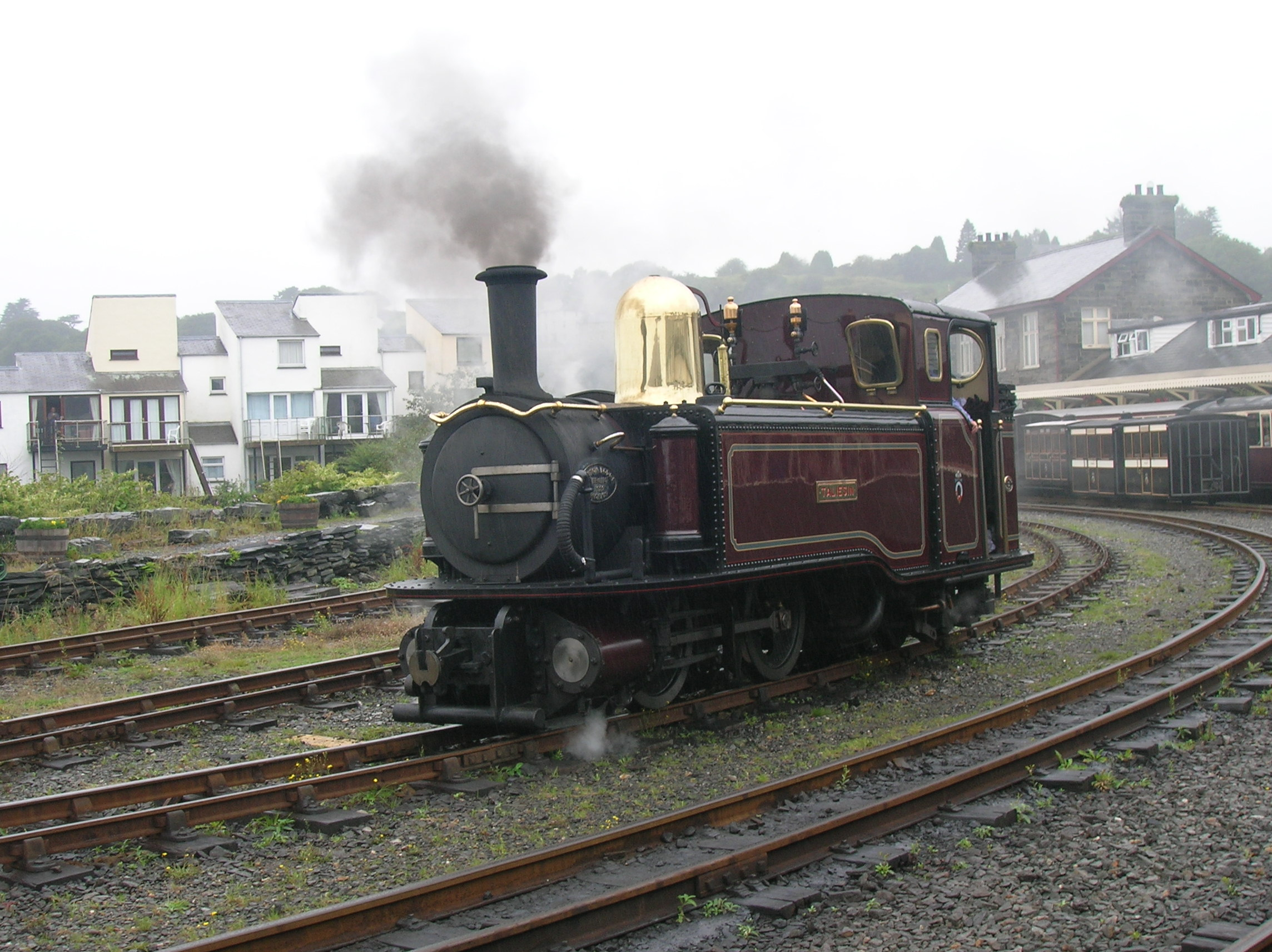
Steam locomotive Taliesin at Porthmadog

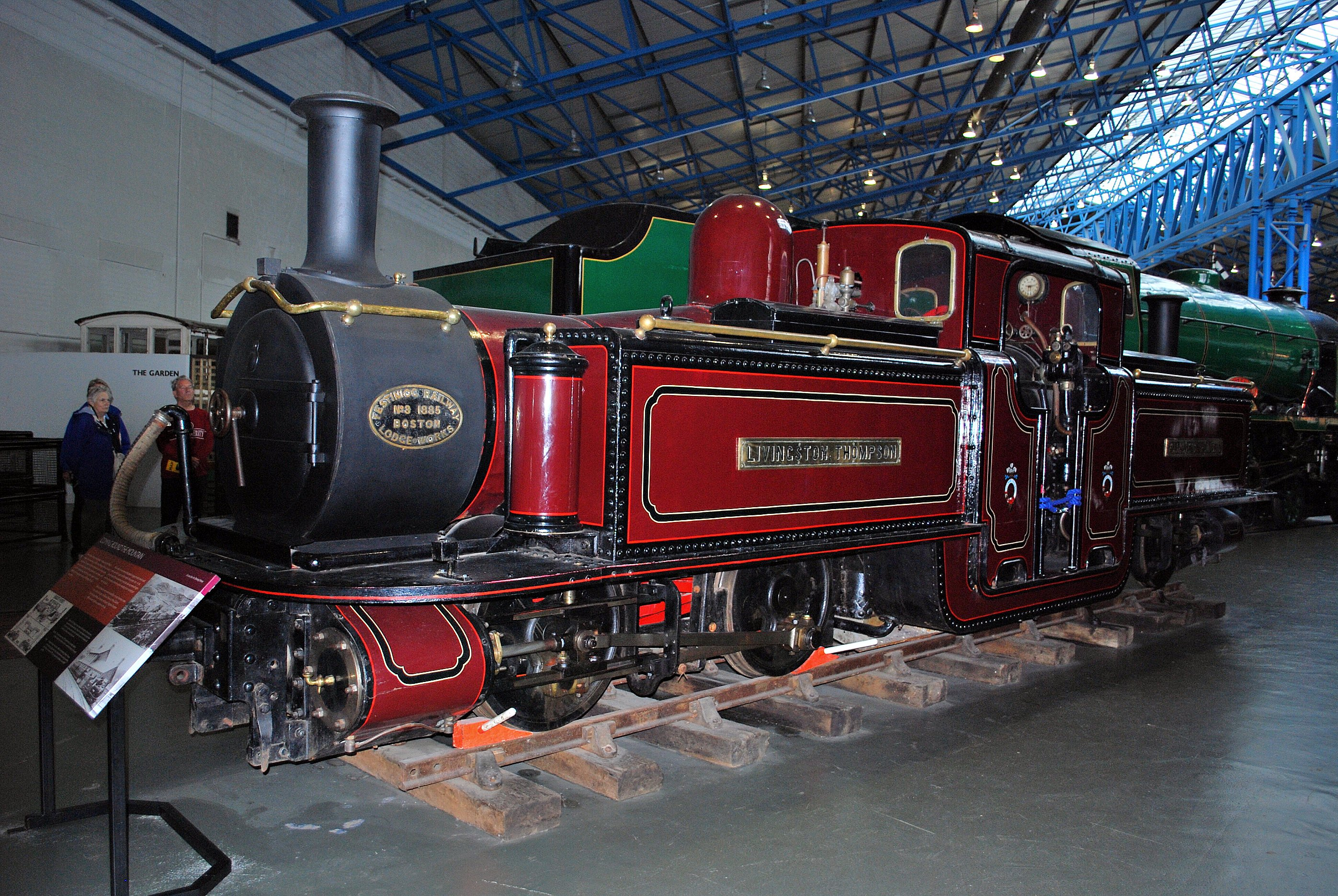
Livingston Thompson at the NRM

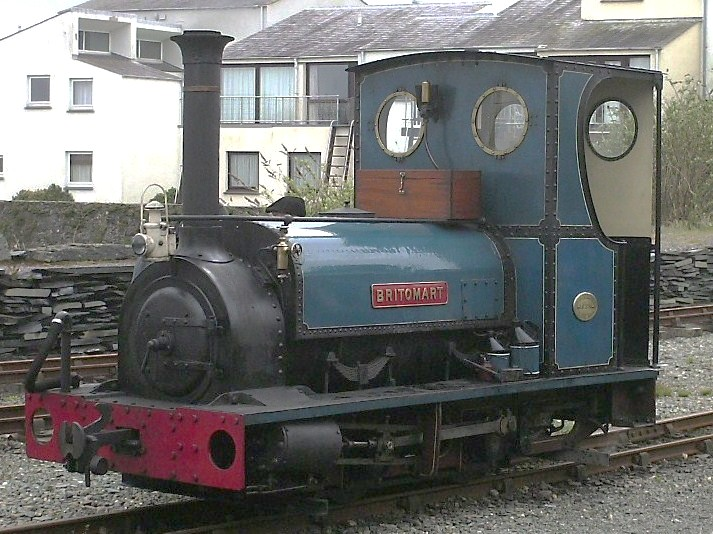
Locomotive "Britomart" on the Ffestiniog Railway, at a Drive an Engine Event

The completion of the railway through to Tanygrisiau (height 640 ft or 195 m) left the FR with just one and a half miles (2.4 km) to go to its goal of Blaenau Ffestiniog (height 710 ft or 216 m) but the complexities of reconstructing that unique but rather derelict urban section of narrow-gauge railway took a further four years. As well as 1 1/2 miles (2.4 km) of new track and its formation, which was the responsibility of the FR permanent way department and its volunteers, much other work needed to be done. Most of the work, like the deviation itself, was undertaken by volunteers who, in many cases, assumed full responsibility for the design as well as the execution of discrete projects, each under a volunteer project leader. There were four decrepit footbridges each needing to be demolished and rebuilt to the new FR loading gauge. The decrepit steel bridge across the Afon Barlwyd required total replacement, with timber (Karri) beams using the original abutments and piers. The new deck is formed of old rails. Walls and fences throughout had to be repaired or replaced. These and the many other varied tasks formed Project Blaenau.

One major task near Tanygrisiau was the responsibility of Gwynedd County Council, which had at some time after 1955 taken advantage of the absence of trains to demolish one of Britain's lowest road-under-railway bridges. In early 1980, therefore, they replaced Dolrhedyn bridge and even managed to give it a few inches extra headroom for road vehicles.

Civil engineering contractors were employed in conjunction with British Rail and Gwynedd County Council for the new route with its bridges and roadworks and the new joint station on the former Great Western Railway station site. British Rail commenced using the new station on 22 March 1982. Ffestiniog trains returned to Blaenau on Tuesday, 25 May 1982, thus marking the 150th Anniversary of royal assent to the Festiniog Railway Act 1832. The new joint station with British Rail at Blaenau Ffestiniog was officially opened on 30 April 1983 by George Thomas, Speaker of the House of Commons, who unveiled a plaque that records his visit.

With the major project of track restoration to Blaenau finally complete, attention could be turned to other matters. More Fairlie locomotives were built or restored and new carriages were built. At Minffordd, a new hostel was built for volunteers who support the permanent staff by working in every department of the railway. Stations were given new buildings, canopies and platforms, often replacing the previous temporary structures and improving the image of the railway for the future.

After fully reopening in 1982 and carrying 200,000 passengers annually, the railway became the second largest Welsh tourist attraction after Caernarfon Castle. Many saw this as the result of Pegler's drive and ability to inspire others with his unquenchable enthusiasm to fulfil his dream. Pegler, who remained fully involved with the railway until his death in 2012 as President, was appointed OBE in the 2006 New Year Honours in recognition of his contribution.

=== Welsh Highland Railway ===
In 1988, the Festiniog Railway Company was involved in a controversial plan to stop the neighbouring Welsh Highland Railway (WHR) being rebuilt, as it was concerned at the effect a nearby heritage railway competitor could have on the FR business. The initial plan would have involved the FR Company buying the original track bed of the WHR from the old company's receiver and giving it to Gwynedd County Council, provided no railway-related developments were allowed on the land. This was greeted with dismay by the WHR (1964) Company, which had been attempting to preserve the line since the 1960s.

This action may have delayed the start of rebuilding of the Welsh Highland Railway, although the alternative plan was dependent on the continued co-operation of Gwynedd County Council to ensure that the track bed was used solely for railway purposes. This was not guaranteed, as pressure from various groups who objected to the rebuilding of the railway was significant and it was the stated intention of the council to apply for an abandonment order on gaining the track bed. This would have left the track bed open for seizure by adverse possession ('squatters' rights') by farmers, use in other ways such as footpaths, road improvement schemes etc., as the statutory designation of the track bed as a railway would have been discontinued. Over the years, the presence of plans for footpaths and roads had indeed made it difficult for anyone wishing to rebuild the line.

This led a group to form 'Trackbed Consolidation Limited' (TCL) and, after some detective work, TCL managed to trace and purchase shares and debentures in the original WHR company. They felt that an alternative plan was available, one where the original company could be brought out of receivership. It was originally the intent of TCL to provide the track bed to the WHR (1964) Company to rebuild the line, but they refused the offer.

TCL were introduced to the FR and decided that the aims and objectives of TCL and the FR were similar thus, since 1988, the FR company has been totally committed to the reopening of the Welsh Highland Railway. All TCL-owned shares/debentures were transferred to the FR on the condition that they would be returned if the railway was not built.

The next few years were marked by protracted legal procedures before the assets of the old company could be transferred and before final consent to rebuild the railway was given. The first section from Caernarfon to Dinas, the Caernarfon Light Railway, was opened and operated by the FR from 11 October 1997 under the Caernarfon Railway Light Railway Order 1997 (SI 1997/2534). This section was not hampered by these extended legal procedures and was built with a light railway order, as it was not part of the original Welsh Highland Railway route; the site of Dinas station had been sold off and thus was not part of the assets of the old WHR company. Other powers under a Transport and Works Act Order enabled restoration to Waunfawr in 2000 and to Rhyd Ddu in 2003. Hafod y Llyn was reached in 2009 and Pont Croesor in 2010. By 2010, the tracks of the WHR and Ffestiniog Railway had been reconnected at Harbour Station, linking Caernarfon to Porthmadog and passenger services started in 2011.

The completed Welsh Highland Railway or Rheilffordd Eryri (its Welsh name) comprises parts of the former London and North Western Railway (1867), North Wales Narrow Gauge Railways (1877–81), Portmadoc, Beddgelert and South Snowdon Railway and Welsh Highland (1922-3) Railway. The FR also links with the WHR (Porthmadog) at Pen-y-Mount Station, north of Porthmadog.

=== Rails ===
Rails increased in weight and strength as traffic changed.

- 16 lb/yd original rails for horse drawn operation
- 30 lb/yd rails for early steam locomotive operation found to be too light.
- 48.66 lb/yd rails for later steam operation

== Tourism and heritage ==
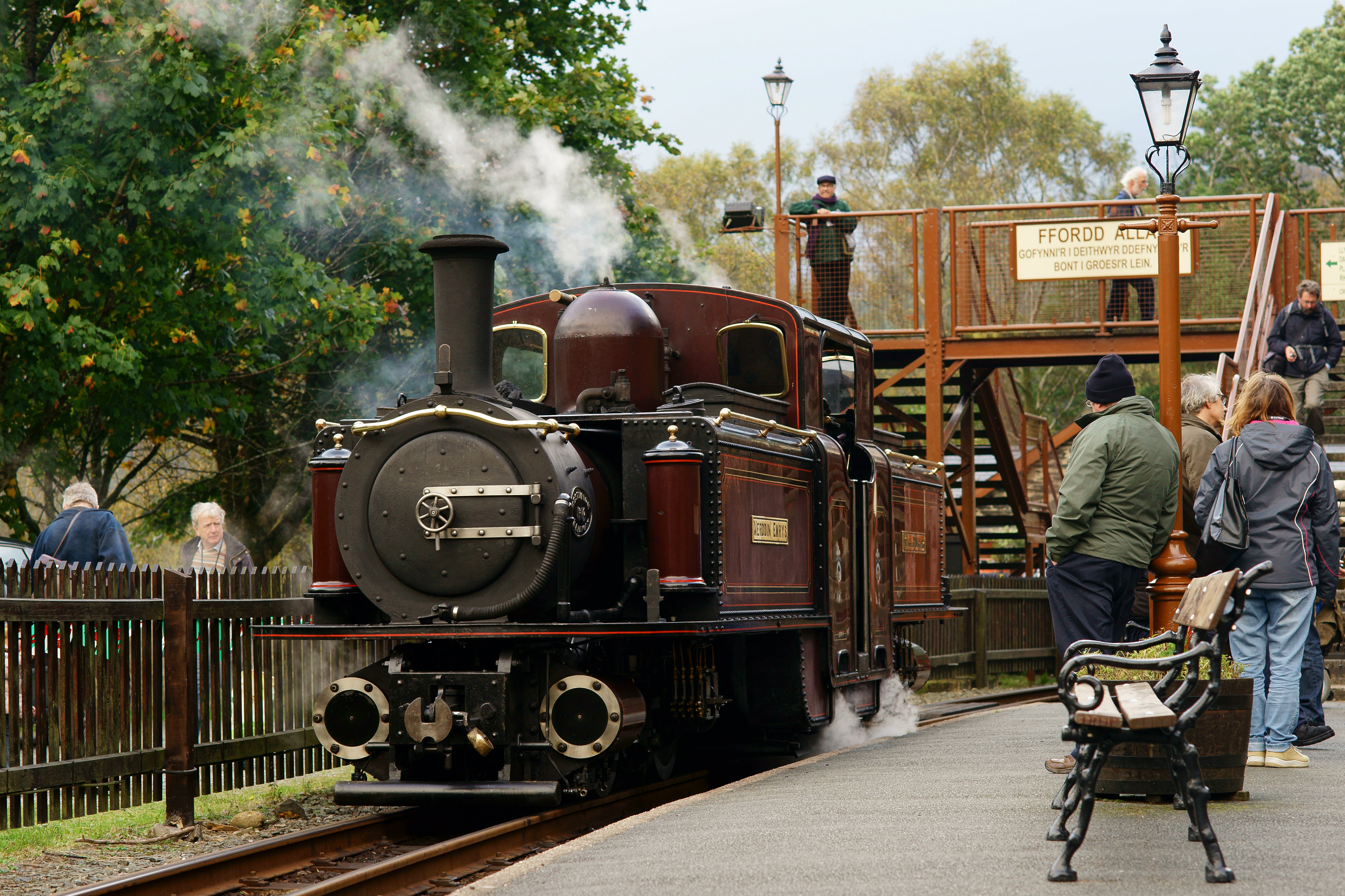
'Merddin Emrys' at Tan-y-Bwlch during Steam 150 - '1863 and All That'

One of the earliest references to tourism is in the LNWR Tourist Guide for 1876, which waxed lyrical about the Ffestiniog Railway, which it illustrated with a drawing of a lady in Welsh National Dress (then still in regular local use) travelling on an FR up train (since many empty slate wagons – with two standing brakesmen – were attached at the rear) with the caption "On the Ffestiniog Railway". The guide uses the "double F" spelling throughout. It was, however, in the inter-war years from 1919 to 1939 that tourism, though always valued, came to acquire a major importance.

Since restoration commenced in 1954, tourism has been the only significant source of income. The role of the Ffestiniog Railway in the promotion and fulfilment of tourism and in preserving railway heritage has been recognised many times, and notable mentions have included:

- 1964 Wales Tourist Board certificate for conspicuous service to Welsh tourism.
- 1972 Wales Tourist Board lists the FR as fifth most popular tourist site in Wales, after Caernarfon Castle, the Swallow Falls, the National Museum of Wales at Cardiff and Conwy Castle.
- 1979 The FR was one of only six sites in Wales to receive the British Tourist Authority's Golden Jubilee Award.
- 1987 The FR was the outright winner of the Independent Railway of the Year award.
- 2004 The "Talking Train" (an internal audio guide) was awarded the Heritage Railway Association 'interpretation' Award.

Recognition of the railway's importance to tourism and heritage has been increasingly marked by financial assistance given to the company towards capital expenditure. Prior to September 1987, the FR had received £1,273,127 in gifts and grants. Of this: £450,476 was gifts from the FR Society and FR Trust and other supporters; £379,335 from Wales Tourist Board; £134,320 from EEC grants and £308,996 from other public sources.

Major grants received subsequently have been: In 1989 a grant of £430,000 (£1,137,765 in 2025), mainly from the EEC (National Programme of Community Interest for the promoting of tourism in Dyfed, Gwynedd and Powys); in 1995 a grant of £500,000 (£1,027,956 in 2025), to promote work in Blaenau Ffestiniog and in 1998 a Heritage Lottery Fund grant of £375,000 (£727,889 in 2025), for the construction of workshops to facilitate the restoration of historic vehicles.

Today the railway is promoted as one of The Great Little Trains of Wales, a joint marketing scheme launched in 1970 that encompasses ten narrow-gauge railways in the country, mostly found in north and mid Wales.

== Rolling stock ==
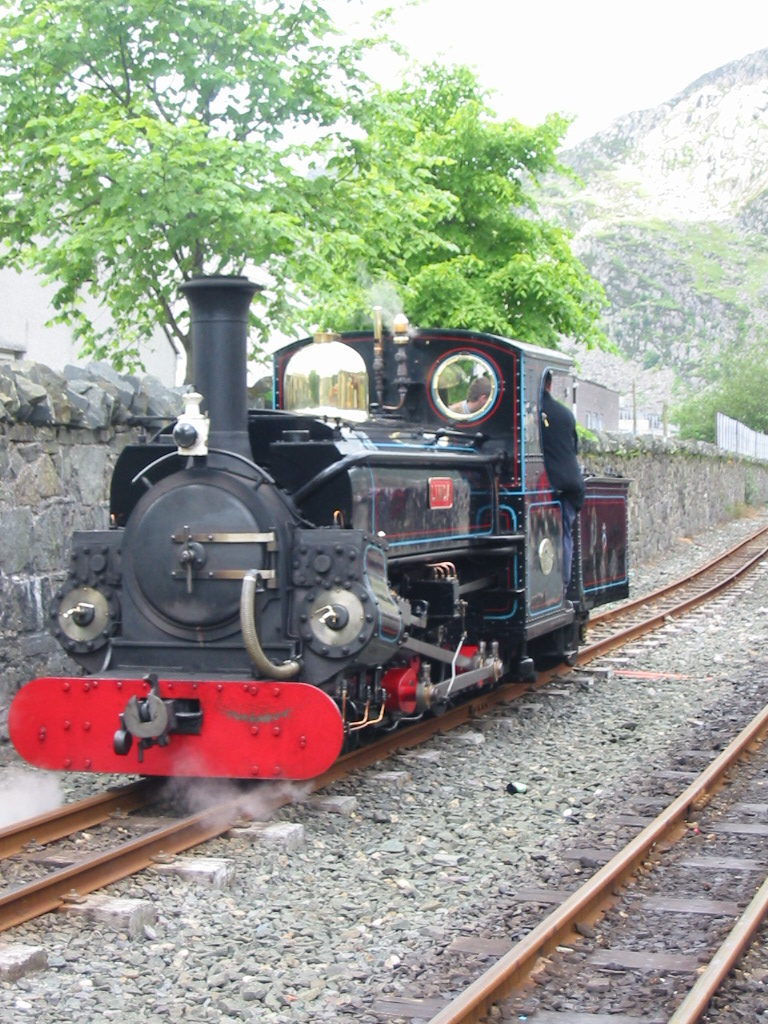
Linda, one of the Ffestiniog Railway's steam locomotives

== Stations and halts ==
At Porthmadog, the original line came via the streets and across the Britannia bridge from the 1836 terminus at the northernmost end of the Welsh Slate Company's Wharf where the FR officially started. This was the second datum point for all pre-1954 mileage calculations. (the first being in Blaenau Ffestiniog). The line over the bridge also connected with the Gorseddau and Croesor Tramways and was later used by Welsh Highland Railway passenger trains from 1923 to 1936. The line over the bridge was last used in 1958 and then dismantled. It was reopened as part of the WHR in 2011.

=== The Cob ===
Between Porthmadog Harbour station and Boston Lodge, the railway runs on the Cob, the dyke of the Traeth Mawr polder. The Cob was built between 1807 and 1811 by William Madocks and, in addition to its land reclamation function in conjunction with sluice gates at the Britannia bridge, it serves also as a roadway (which, since 1836, has been at a lower level on the landward side) and as a bridge across the Afon Glaslyn. Tolls were charged with a tollgate at Boston Lodge until 2003, when the rights were purchased by the National Assembly for Wales.

The higher, original, section of the Cob carries, in addition to the railway, a public footpath throughout virtually its entire length. There is no fencing between the footpath and the railway, because the railway does not own the top of the Cob, but used a wayleave under the local act of Parliament, the Portmadoc Harbour Act 1821 (1 & 2 Geo. 4. c.cxv) (Note: An Act to alter and amend an Act of his late Majesty’s Reign, intituled An Act to enable his Majesty to vest the Sands of Traeth Mawr, dividing the Counties of Carnarvon and Merioneth, in William Alexander Madocks Esquire, and for building Quays and other Works, for the Purpose of facilitating the landing, loading and unloading of Ships and Vessels frequenting the Harbour of Port Madoc, in the said County of Carnarvon.) for improving Porthmadog Harbour. This act was repealed by the Porthmadog Harbour Revision Order 1998 (SI 1998/683) and is no longer in force.

== Quarries served by the railway ==
The Ffestiniog Railway was built primarily to connect the slate quarries in the mountains around what is now Blaenau Ffestiniog with the harbour at Porthmadog. In all at least 23 quarries were directly or indirectly connected to the railway, often by inclines. They sent their finished products over the railway in slate waggons to be transferred onto ships or, later, onto the standard-gauge railway at Minffordd.

== Train operation since 1955 ==
=== Infrastructure ===
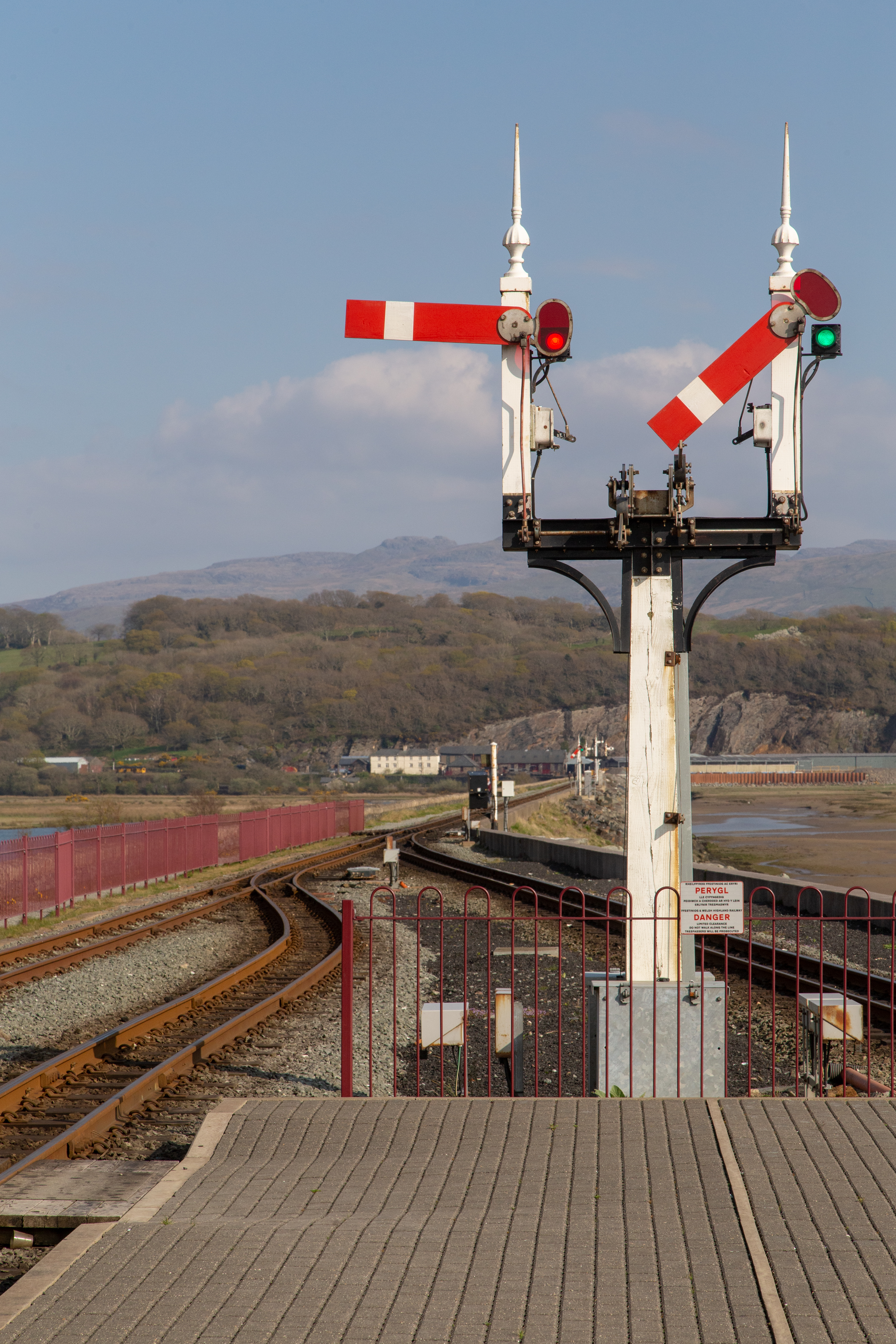
Signals at Porthmadog Harbour Station

As the line was extended, passing loops were brought into operation at Minffordd, Penrhyn and Tan-y-Bwlch. Due to the restrictions to the length of trains that could be passed at Penrhyn, Rhiw Goch was opened on 14 May 1975. Penrhyn loop remained in service for several more years before it was closed. By the end of the 1970s, the passing loops were at Minffordd, Rhiw Goch, Tan-y-Bwlch and Dduallt, and an intensive service was run in the peak summer seasons (although there were empty "slots" in the timetable which could be used by works trains). From the early 1980s, the peak summer timetable had three train sets in operation, generally passing at Rhiw Goch and Dduallt.

Automatic signalling was installed at Tan-y-Bwlch in 1986. By the 1988 season, in part due to the challenges in maintenance of the top end points at Dduallt and the planned automation of Minffordd, the loops at Dduallt and Rhiw Goch had been taken out of service for crossing trains. At the end of May 1988, Dduallt ceased to be a token station and Dduallt loop was taken out of service altogether and became a siding. Rhiw Goch ceased to be used except on odd occasions and was taken out of use as a means to cross passenger trains in 1989. The short section token instruments and the signal heads were removed, although the loop could still be used as a refuge for Engineers' trains. Minffordd and Tan-y-Bwlch therefore became the usual passing loops, both automated.

In the late 1990s, Rhiw Goch was recommissioned as a passing loop. From the 2005 season, the box has been regularly manned during the summer to provide additional operational flexibility. In 2006, an appeal was launched, through the FR Society, for funds to replace the life-expired signal box with a building of more traditional appearance. Fundraising went well and work was completed during the closed season of 2006/07.

Elsewhere, Tanygrisiau had been provided with a run-round loop whilst it had been the terminus between June 1978 and May 1982. This loop was removed when the line was reopened to Blaenau Ffestiniog. In the mid-1990s, a project was launched to install a fully signalled passing loop. This proceeded as a volunteer project, including the building of a signal box. However, prior to commissioning, the project was abandoned in 2001. The trackwork (apart for the siding off the Up Loop) remained in situ. In June 2002, the loop was once again used to run trains around as part of the 2002 Gala to celebrate the twentieth anniversary of the restoration of services to Blaenau Ffestiniog. The intended platform starter signals (posts, brackets and arms) have been recovered and some are now in use on the Isle of Man Railway, whilst others are destined for the resignalling of Harbour Station. In 2004, with new disc starter signals and spring-loaded points installed, Tanygrisiau became a passing loop for the first time.

=== Train control and regulation ===
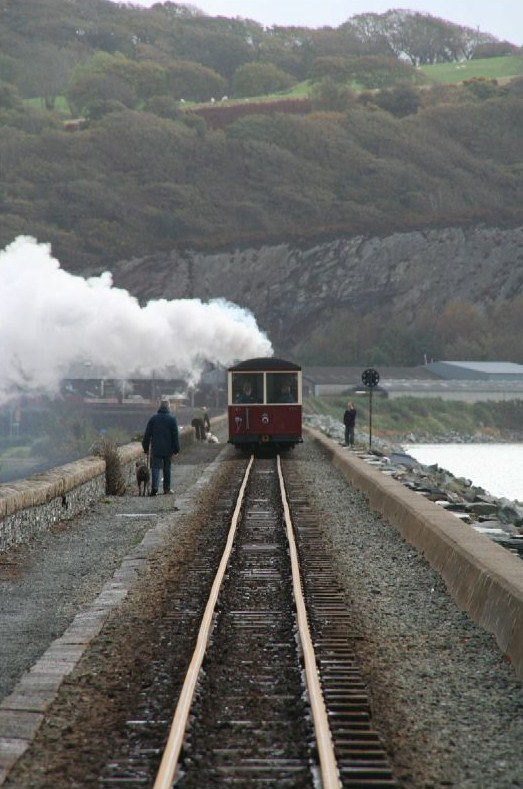
A Ffestiniog Railway train leaves Porthmadog and heads towards Blaenau Ffestiniog along the Cob

The Ffestiniog Railway operates on the electric token system (ETS) using a mixture of miniature and large train staffs, under the overall control of the duty controller based at Porthmadog.

Miniature train staffs are provided for:

- Porthmadog to Minffordd (Intermediate Instrument at Boston Lodge)
- Minffordd to Tanybwlch – Long Section (Intermediate Instrument at Rhiw Goch)
- Tanybwlch to Tanygrisiau (Intermediate Instrument at Dduallt)
- Tanygrisiau to Blaenau Ffestiniog (Intermediate Instrument at Glan-y-Pwll)

Large train staffs are provided for:

- Minffordd to Rhiw Goch – Short Section
- Rhiw Goch to Tanybwlch – Short Section

The Short Section train staffs are brought into service by opening Rhiw Goch Signalbox, hence trapping the Minffordd to Tanybwlch Long Section Miniature train staff in the lever frame, when the signal box is opened and manned by a signalman.

The signalling and ETS equipment is primarily designed for train crew operation. To obtain permission to withdraw a train staff to enter a single line section, Control has to be contacted.

The Control Office regulates train running, giving permission for trains to enter the single line sections, recording train movements on the Train Graph, ensuring trains are formed of an appropriate number of carriages (depending on the expected train loadings), acting as the single point of contact in the rare event of a failure occurring with rolling stock, and making station announcements at Porthmadog

The Control Office is also responsible for the Train Operation on the Welsh Highland Railway and it also regulates trains from the Welsh Highland Railway Limited, including the interface with the Network Rail ERTMS signaller (in Shrewsbury) to clear the WHR route where it crosses the main Cambrian Coast (standard gauge) line at grade between Pont Croesor and Porthmadog. This is the only mixed narrow/standard-gauge level crossing in the UK, and an interface between 19th and 21st century signalling systems.

== See also ==
- British narrow-gauge railways
- Fairlie locomotive
- Gloddfa Ganol
- Llechwedd Slate Caverns

== Bibliography ==
- Boyd, James I.C. (1975) [1959]. The Festiniog Railway 1800 - 1974; Vol. 1 - History and Route. The British Narrow Gauge Railway. Blandford: The Oakwood Press. ISBN 978-0-85361-167-7. OCLC 2074549. B1A.
- Boyd, James I.C. (1975) [1959]. The Festiniog Railway 1800 - 1974; Vol. 2 - Locomotives and Rolling Stock; Quarries and Branches: Rebirth 1954-74. The British Narrow Gauge Railway. Blandford: The Oakwood Press. ISBN 978-0-85361-168-4. OCLC 874117875. B1B.
- Ove Arup & Partners; Report on a Rock Fall at Penlan, Ffestiniog Railway, 1979
- E. Beazley; Madocks and the Wonder of Wales, 1967
- R. F. Bleasdale; Spooner Album, 1887, also repub. with commentary by A. Gray, 2003
- D. Blenkinsop; Linda & Blanche 1993
- J. I. C. Boyd; Narrow Gauge Rails to Portmadoc, 1949
- J. I. C. Boyd; On the Welsh Narrow Gauge, no date (1970s)
- J. Buck; Discovering Narrow Gauge Railways, 1972
- D. J. Charlton; FR Spotter's Guide; 2001
- C. F. Cliffe; Book of North Wales, 1850
- W. J. K. Davies; Narrow Gauge Railways, 1962
- R. Edwards & P. Moss (eds); Festiniog Railway Historic Drawings, 1997
- R. F. Fairlie; Battle of the Gauges renewed, 1872
- R. F. Fairlie; Locomotive Engines, what they are and what they should be, 1881, reprint 1969
- Festiniog Railway Co.; Share prospectus, Traveller's Guides, Stock Books, Guide Books (about 40 in all), 1957–2005
- Festiniog Railway Society; Newsletters 1954-7;
- Festiniog Railway Society; FR Magazine, quarterly since 1958 – Ffestiniog since 1994
- A. Gray; The Spooner Album, 2003. See also Bleasdale.
- N. F. Gurley; Narrow Gauge Steam out of Portmadoc, 1980
- L. Heath-Humphrys; letter to Railway Gazette, 27 July 1951
- G. T. Heavyside; Narrow Gauge into the 80s, 1980
- B. Hollingsworth; Ffestiniog Adventure, 1981
- F. H. Howson; Narrow Gauge Railways of Britain, 1948
- P. N. Jarvis; Adeiladu Muriau Cerrig Sych – dry stone walling on the Ffestiniog Railway, 1993, revised edn 1995
- Johnson, Peter (1997). Ffestiniog Railway – a View from the Past.
- Johnson, Peter (2007). An Illustrated History of the Festiniog Railway 1832–1954.
- Johnson, Peter (2004). Immortal Rails; the Story of the Closure and Revival of the Ffestiniog Railway 1939–1983. Vol. I. Chester: Rail Romances. ISBN 1-900622-08-4.
- Johnson, Peter (2005). Immortal Rails; the Story of the Closure and Revival of the Ffestiniog Railway 1939–1983. Vol. II. Chester: Rail Romances. ISBN 1-900622-09-2.
- Johnson, Peter (1992). Portrait of the Ffestiniog.
- Johnson, Peter (1992). Welsh Narrow gauge; a view from the past.
- Johnson, Peter (1992). Welsh Narrow Gauge in colour.
- P. Johnson & C.M. Whitehouse; Ffestiniog mewn lliw, 1995
- J. R. Jones & A. Pritchard; Great Little Steam Railways of Wales, 1991
- F. Jux; British Narrow gauge Steam, 1960
- R. W. Kidner; Narrow Gauge Railways of Wales, 1947
- M. Kington; Steaming through Britain, 1990
- C. E. Lee; Narrow Gauge Railways in North Wales, 1945
- M. J. T. Lewis; How Ffestiniog got its Railway, 1965, revised edn 1968
- J. C. V. Mitchell & A.G.W. Garraway; Festiniog in the Fifties, 1997
- J. C. V. Mitchell & A.G.W. Garraway; Festiniog in the Sixties, 1997
- J. C. V. Mitchell & A.G.W. Garraway; Return to Blaenau 1970–82, 2001
- J. C. V. Mitchell, Smith, Seymour, Gray; Branch lines around Porthmadog, 2 vols, 1993
- F. H. Pole (ed); Welsh Mountain Railways, 1924, reprint 1985
- J. D. C. A. Prideaux; Welsh Narrow Gauge Railway, 1976
- Quine, Dan (2013). The George England locomotives of the Ffestiniog Railway. London: Flexiscale.
- P. J. G. Ransom; Narrow Gauge Steam, 1996
- P. J. G. Ransom; Locomotion, 2001
- A. Roberts; Gossiping Guide to North Wales, 1879 (the 5/- version is much superior to the 6d edition)
- L. J. Roberts; Festiniog & Welsh Highland Holiday book, 1923
- H. R. Schwabe; Mit Volldampf nach Ffestiniog, 1978
- C. E. Spooner; Narrow Gauge Railways, 1871, revised edn 1879
- H. Stretton; Past & Present Companion; Ffestiniog Railway, 1998
- M. J. Stretton; Festiniog Railway in Camera, 1971-1971, revised edn 1999
- 'Taliesin' (C. R. Weaver et al.); Festiniog Railway locomotives, 1988
- J. Timpson; Little Trains of Britain, 1992
- E. Vignes; Étude technique sur le chemin de fer Festiniog, 1878, English translation by Don Boreham 1986
- Waite, James (2023). Narrow Gauge Through Porthmadog. Narrow Gauge Album No. 6. Chippenham, Wilts, UK: Mainline & Maritime. ISBN 9781900340861.
- F. T. Wayne; "When Accounts become misleading Nonsense", Accountancy, November 1961
- Whitehouse, P. B. (1963). Festiniog Railway Revival.
- Whitehouse, P. B. (1969). Welsh Narrow Gauge Album.
- Whitehouse, P. B.; Allen, P.C. (1966). Round the World on the Narrow Gauge.
- Whitehouse, P. B.; Allen, P.C. (1966). Narrow Gauge the World over.
- C. Winchester & C.J. Allen,(eds.); Railway Wonders of the World, Vol 2, pp. 1224–28. c. 1938.
- J. Winton; Little Wonder, 1975, revised edn 1986
