= Minffordd railway station =

Railway station in Gwynedd, Wales

Minffordd
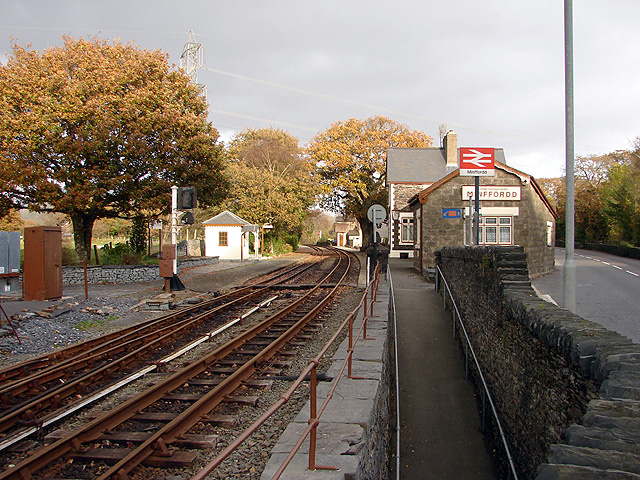
- The upper (Ffestiniog Railway) level of Minffordd station

General information
- Location: Minffordd, Gwynedd; Wales
- Coordinates: 52.926°N 4.084°W
- Grid reference: SH599385
- Manager: Ffestiniog Railway (upper level); Transport for Wales (lower level)
- Platforms: 2 (narrow gauge); 1 (standard gauge)

Other information
- Station code: MFF
- Classification: DfT category F2

History
- Original company: Ffestiniog Railway (upper); Aberystwith and Welsh Coast Railway (lower)
- Pre-grouping: Cambrian Railways (lower)

Key dates
- March 1871: Festiniog station opened
- 1 August 1872: Aberystwith and Welsh Coast Railway platform opened
- 1887: Present station buildings constructed
- 15 September 1939: Festiniog Railway services withdrawn
- 19 May 1956: Festiniog Railway services resume
- 1964: Mainline station became unstaffed

Passengers
- 2021/22: ▲13,658
- 2022/23: ▲14,932
- 2023/24: ▲15,982
- 2024/25: ▲18,174
- 2025/26: ▲20,344
Location
Notes
- Passenger statistics from the Office of Rail and Road

Minffordd railway station (translation Roadside, literally Lip of the Road) is a pair of adjacent stations on separate lines in Gwynedd, Wales. The mainline station opened as Minfford Junction on 1 August 1872 at the point where the then recently built Aberystwith and Welsh Coast Railway line from Dovey Junction to Pwllheli (latterly to become part of the Cambrian Railways) passes under the earlier narrow gauge Ffestiniog Railway. The latter was built in 1836 to carry dressed slate from Blaenau Ffestiniog to Porthmadog for export by sea, and had carried passengers from 1865 onwards. The station was renamed Minffordd in 1890.

A short walk, advertised near the station, leads to Portmeirion.

== Standard gauge facilities ==
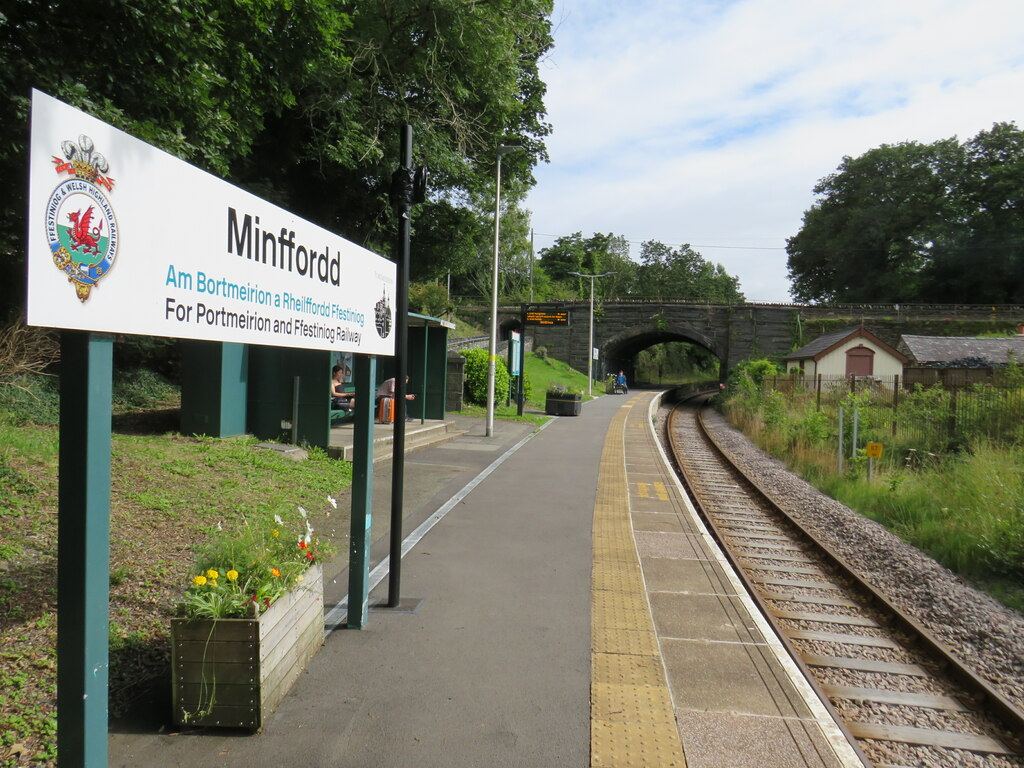
Looking south along the National Rail platform. The southern end, beyond the bridge is disused. To the left, behind the shelter, is the ramp to the subway under the Ffestiniog Railway.

The standard gauge station consists of a single platform with a simple shelter linked to the narrow gauge station by way of an underbridge and a pedestrian ramp. Access to the Cambrian Line is thus by way of the Ffestiniog Railway "Up" platform. Passenger service on the Ffestiniog Railway was withdrawn on 15 September 1939, and reopened to Minffordd 19 May 1956, but easy pedestrian access to the Cambrian Line was maintained throughout the closed period. Mr Parry, GWR and BR stationmaster at Minffordd for 40 years, retired in 1964 and the BR station then became an unstaffed halt. At some point the facilities were replaced by the standard small halt "bus stop" shelter.

== Narrow gauge facilities ==
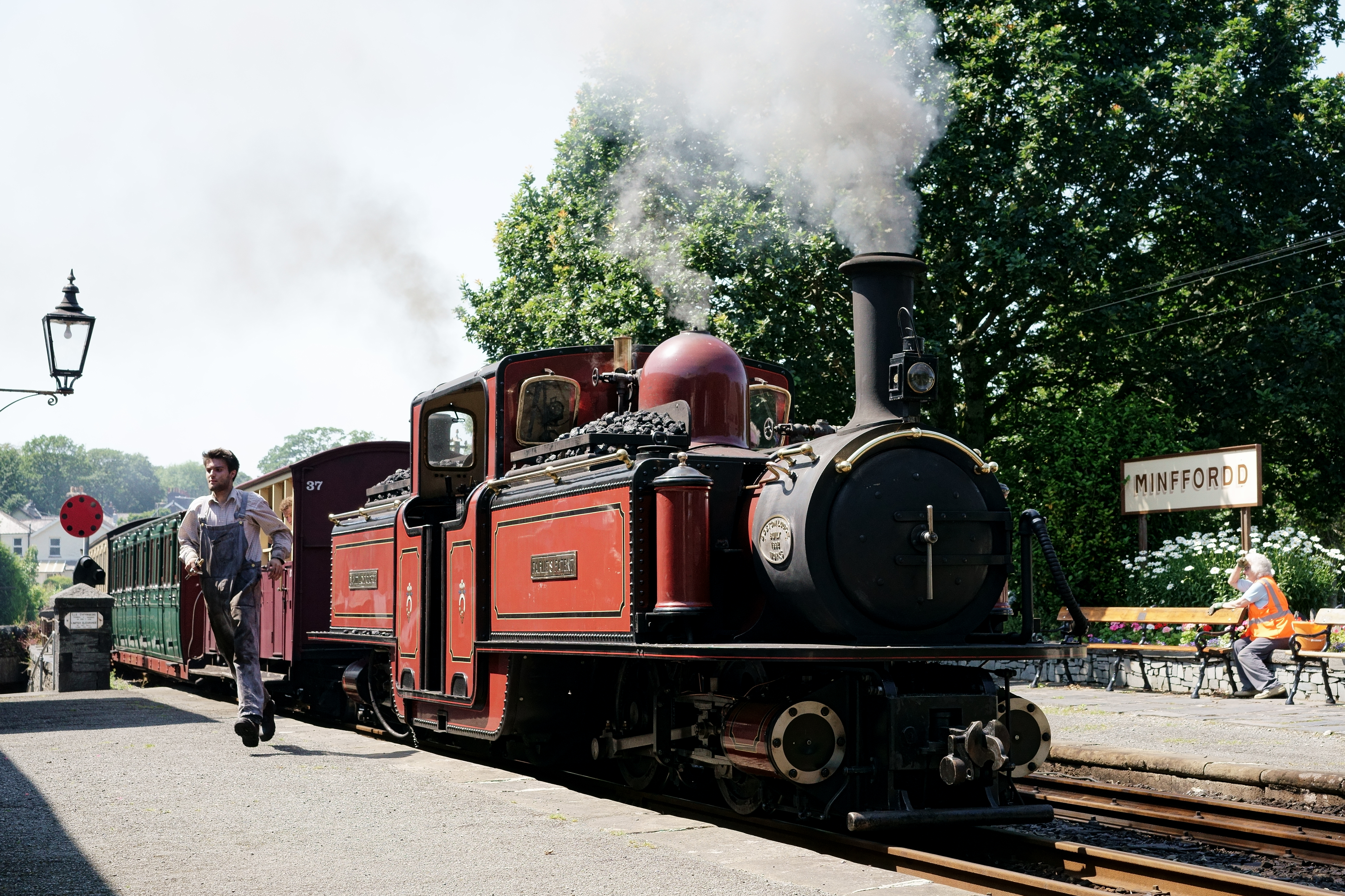
'David Lloyd George' Arriving at Minffordd

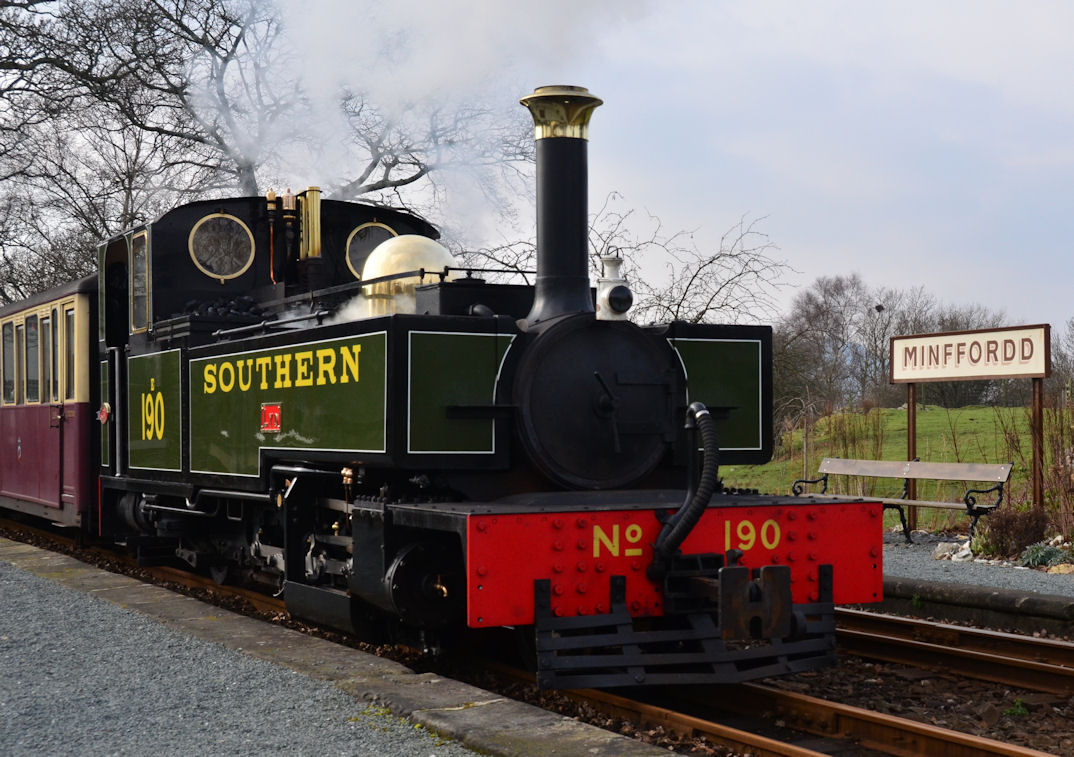
The locomotive "Lyd" at Minffordd Station

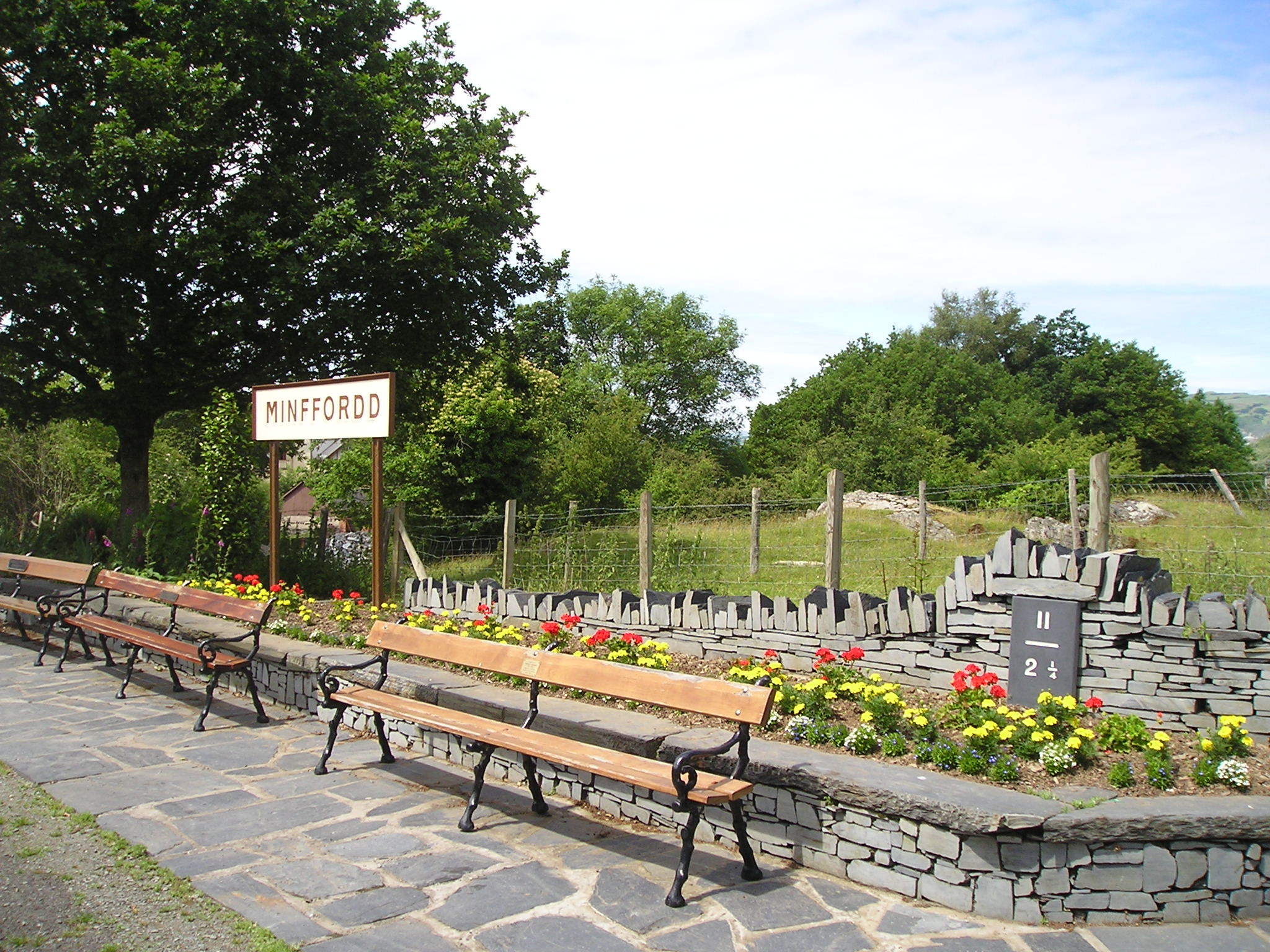
The Ffestiniog Railway down platform

The present substantial stone built Ffestiniog Railway station buildings, at a height of 85 metres (279 ft) above sea level and a distance of just over 2 miles (3.2 km) from Porthmadog Harbour, are on the "Up" platform and date from 1887, but there is as yet little evidence of earlier buildings. There was a small wooden building on the "Down" platform and this building (possibly dating from the 1870s) was in a derelict condition when it was demolished in 1956. A replica was completed in spring 2002 and was later shortlisted in the National Railway Heritage Awards (2002).

At the beginning of 2011 the line was temporarily severed at the north east end of the station between the end of the loop at Cae Ednyfed Cottage and Bron Turner crossing for the construction of the Porthmadog bypass. The new bridge is wide enough for the passing loop to be extended.

== Passenger interchange ==
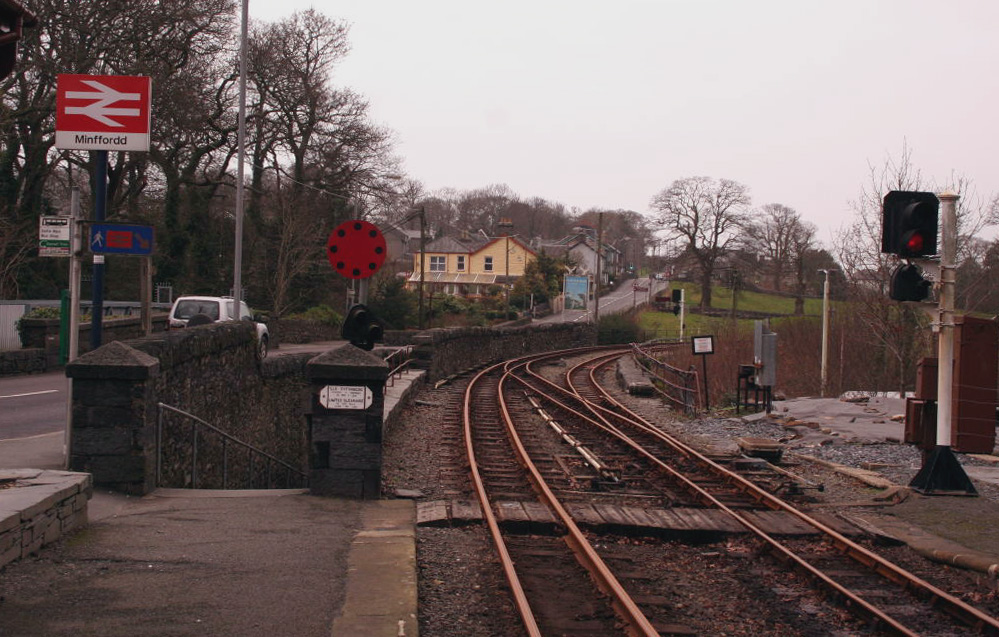
Transport Interchange at Minffordd – bus stop on far left of picture; left of picture ramp/subway to National Rail platform; and centre/right Ffestiniog Railway tracks, ends of platforms and foot crossing, and in the middle, the slope down to the Cambrian Coast Line platform.

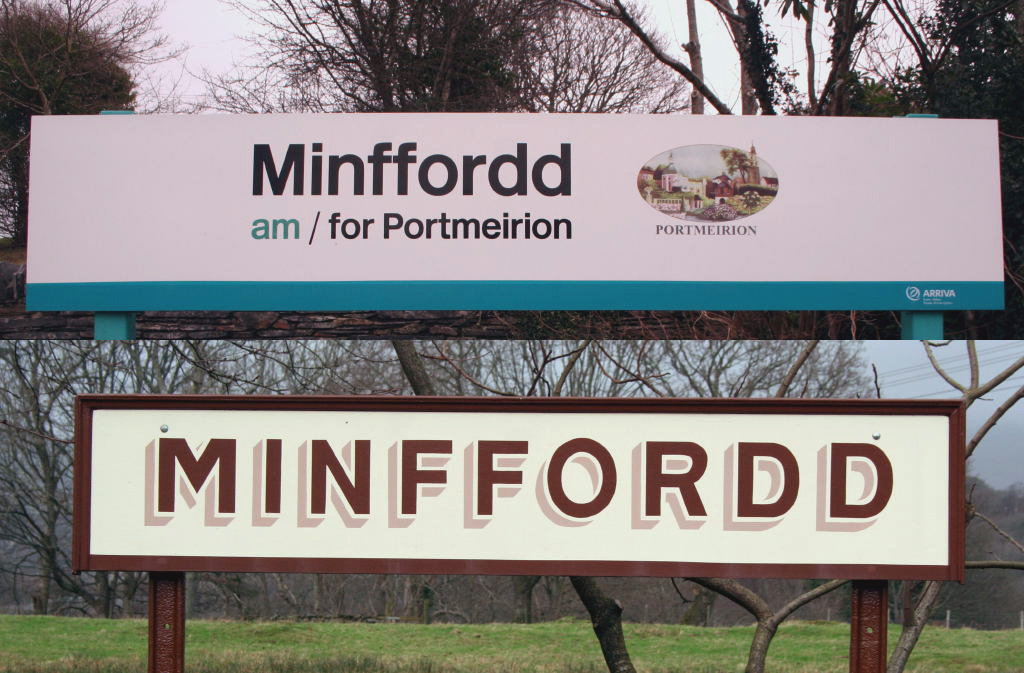
Minffordd Station Boards

Passenger interchange between standard gauge and narrow gauge railways in the UK has never been common. The facility at Minffordd with the close proximity of lines is the earliest, 1872, and is still in regular use. There is no evidence of joint timetabling between the gauges here.

During the late 1950s and the 1960s the interchange saw much use by chartered trains bringing visitors to the Ffestiniog Railway. Following the reopening of the joint Blaenau Ffestiniog railway station in 1982, most chartered trains now operate by that route.

There have been several notable visitors using Minffordd station. The first was on 27 August 1889 when Prince and Princess Henry of Battenberg arrived from Barmouth by Cambrian Railways Royal train. They were received at Minffordd Junction by Mr & Mrs Williams of Castell Deudraeth. A guard of honour was mounted by the 2nd Volunteer Battalion Royal Welsh Fusiliers and the royal party were conducted by Mr Williams to the Ffestiniog railway station where they joined a special train to Tan-y-Bwlch. They took tea at Plas Tan-y-Bwlch with Mr & Mrs Oakeley while the Oakeley Silver Band played on the terrace. Mr Oakeley afterwards drove the prince and princess to Maentwrog Road station, for their return by the Great Western Railway Royal Train to Llandderfel.

Dr Hastings Banda, President of Malawi, accompanied by Lord Snowdon and the Secretary of State for Wales visited the railway on 23 May 1968. Seven years later, on 25 July 1975, Princess Margaret, Viscount Linley and Lady Sarah Armstrong-Jones travelled from Minffordd in a special train to view the Festiniog Railway Deviation. Lord Linley travelled on the footplate for part of the journey.

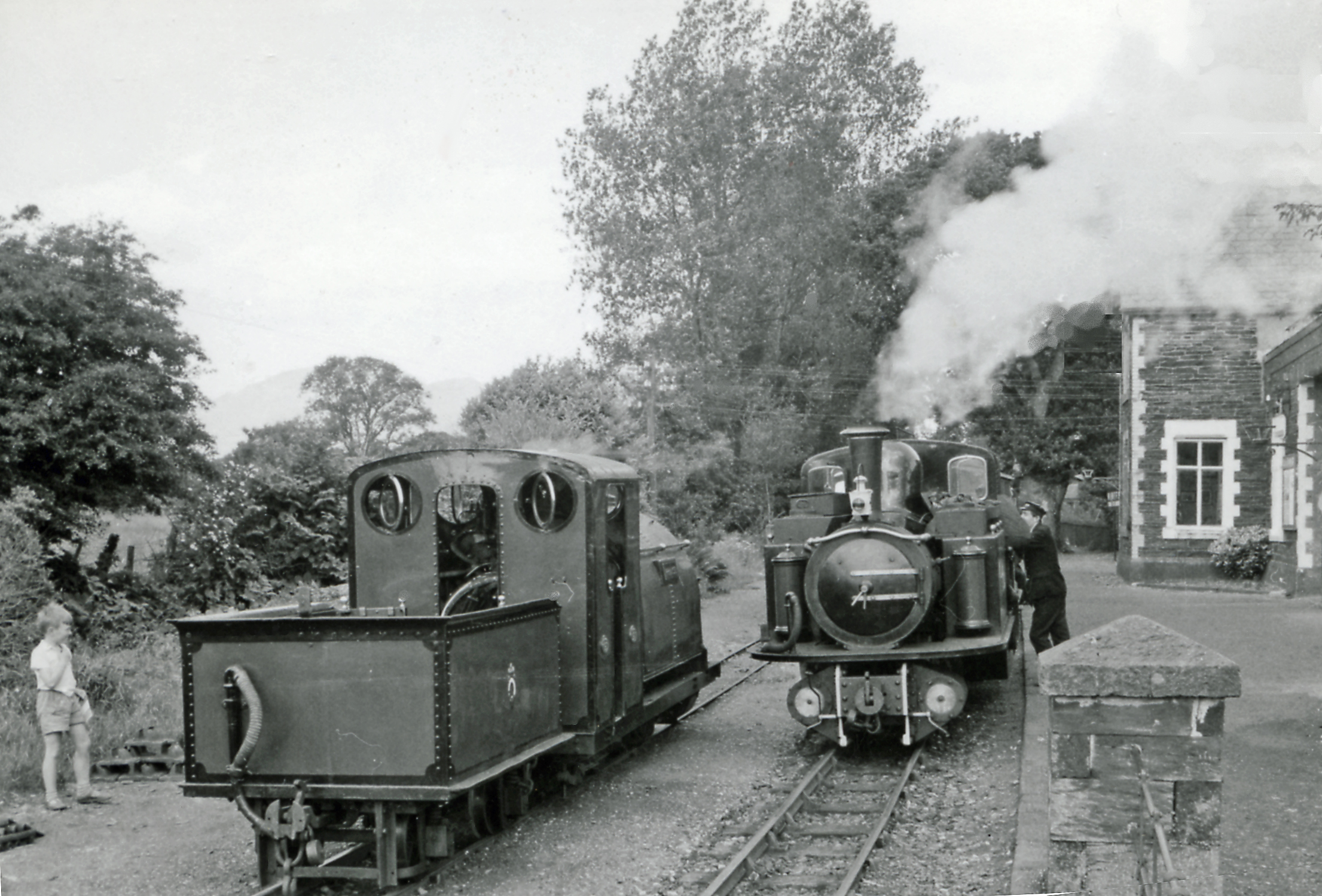
Two Ffestiniog locomotives at Minfford, 1964

After first inspecting Barmouth Bridge, the chairman of the British Railways Board, Sir Peter Parker, arrived at Minffordd on 17 June 1980 in an inspection saloon hauled by a motor parcels van, as locomotives were not at that time allowed over the Barmouth Bridge. On the Festiniog Railway, Sir Peter travelled on the footplate from Minffordd as far as Tan-y-Bwlch before continuing to Tanygrisiau and then by road to Blaenau Ffestiniog.

== Other railway facilities at Minffordd ==
To the railway historian and, indeed, the railway archaeologist, the railways at Minffordd are of considerable interest.

=== Minffordd Junction Goods and Minerals Exchange Yard ===
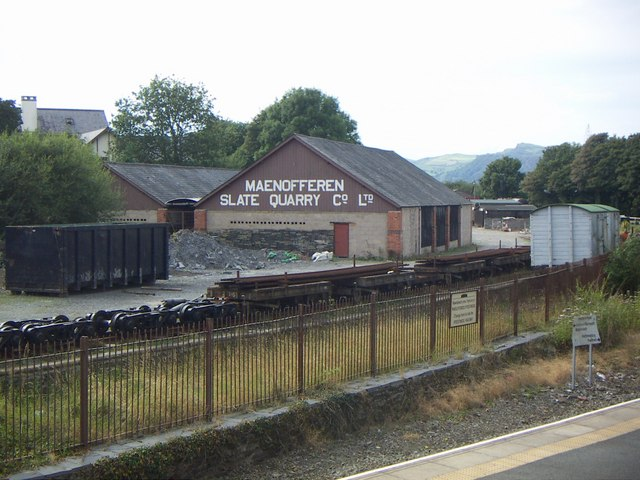
The Minffordd Yard

The adjacent Minffordd Yard, the former exchange yard between standard gauge and narrow gauge railways, can only be accessed by rail from the down platform of Minffordd station. The exchange sidings laid out in 1872 to the design of Charles Easton Spooner the great advocate of narrow gauge railways, whose book "Narrow Gauge Railways" was published in 1871, were extensive and at first were heavily used primarily for the transshipment of coal and goods destined for Blaenau Ffestiniog. This traffic declined rapidly after the LNWR reached Blaenau Ffestiniog in 1879. Outwards slate traffic by rail from Minffordd did, however, develop and in time surpassed the sea bound traffic via Porthmadog as the volume being exported declined. This slate traffic by rail from Minffordd (ironically, after 1946, using slate brought by road from Blaenau Ffestiniog) lasted until the early 1960s. Minffordd yard is now used exclusively for Ffestiniog Railway purposes and the standard gauge connection was removed in 1973.

=== Minffordd volunteers' hostel ===
A new and purpose designed volunteers’ hostel was built between 1992 and 1998 in two stages on land between the railway and the exchange sidings. This hostel replaced a temporary hostel established in Minffordd Yard in 1978. The hostel provides residential accommodation for volunteer staff working on this heritage railway.

=== Minffordd – Lottie’s Cottage ===
This Grade II listed building was the crossing keeper's house and was the home of the late Mrs Lottie Edwards, for many years the Quarry Lane Crossing Keeper, and of her late husband Dai Edwards, a railway ganger. It has been restored in their memory. The cottage adjoins the gate, which has now been replaced by an automated system.

=== Cae Ednyfed ===
English: Ednyfed’s field

This farm provided stabling for some of the horses used on the railway prior to 1863. These horses operated between Boston Lodge and Rhiw Goch, hauling empty slate wagons uphill.

Nos. 1, 2 & 3 Cae Ednyfed – The three terraced cottages behind the water tower at Minffordd station are thought to have been used originally in connection with horse traction, possibly as stables. Nos 1 and 2 Cae Ednyfed have recently been combined into a single dwelling.

=== Minffordd weighbridge ===
A pair of railway wagon weighbridges existed side by side, outside the weighbridge office (that still exists) next to the railway crossing at the road entrance to Minffordd exchange sidings and to the volunteers' hostel. The remains of these weighbridges rest in two slate wagons in the yard. The weighbridge office underwent a major refurbishment in 2007–08.

== Services ==
Preceding station	National Rail	Following station
Porthmadog	Transport for Wales; Cambrian Coast Line	Penrhyndeudraeth
Preceding station	Heritage railways	Following station
Boston Lodge Halt towards Porthmadog Harbour	Ffestiniog Railway	Penrhyn towards Blaenau Ffestiniog
Historical railways
Porthmadog; Line and station open	Cambrian Railways; Aberystwith and Welsh Coast Railway	Penrhyndeudraeth; Line and station open
