= Peter Johnson (railway historian) =

British railway historian and author

Peter Johnson is a British railway historian and author who specialises in books and articles on narrow-gauge railways. He is particularly associated with the Ffestiniog Railway.

== History ==
Johnson is a retired local government officer who lives in Leicester.

Johnson is known for his "meticulous research into all aspects of the [Ffestiniog] railway’s operation". He was a director of the Ffestiniog Railway Society from 1991 to 2003 and editor (originally jointly with Norman Gurley and Dan Wilson) of the Festiniog Railway Society Magazine from 1974 to 2003. In 2003 he was appointed the Festiniog Railway Company's official photographer.

From June 1995 until Match 2019, Johnson contributed a monthly column of narrow gauge railway news for Steam Railway magazine; as of September 2017 he was the magazine's longest serving continuous contributor. Since 2006 he has written obituaries of prominent railway people for The Guardian newspaper.

== Works ==
- Johnson, Peter (1984). Rails in Wales – The Cambrian Lines. Ian Allan.
- —— (1985). The British Travelling Post Office. Ian Allan.
- —— (1985). Vintage Roadscene Special British Trams & Tramways in the 1980s. Ian Allan.
- —— (1985). Railway World Special The Welsh Narrow Gauge Railways. Ian Allan.
- —— (1986). Trams in Blackpool. AB Publishing.
- —— (1986). Trams in Blackpool (enlarged ed.). AB Publishing.
- —— (1986). Festiniog Railway Gravity Trains. Festiniog Railway Heritage Group.
- —— (1986). Festiniog 150 The History of the Festiniog Railway. Ian Allan.
- —— (1987). Festiniog 150th Anniversary A Celebration. AB Publishing.
- —— (1987). Railway World Annual 1988 (Editor). Ian Allan.
- —— (1988). Festiniog Railway Locomotives. AB Publishing.
- —— (1991). Railway World Special The Welsh Harrow Gauge Railways 2nd edition. Ian Allan.
- —— (1992). Portrait of the Festiniog. Ian Allan.
- —— (1993). The Welsh Narrow Gauge in Colour. Ian Allan.
- —— (1995). Festiniog in Colour. Ian Allan.
- —— (1995). Mail by Rail The History of the TPO & Post Office Railway. Ian Allan.
- —— (1995). Celebration of Steam North Wales. Ian Allan.
- —— (1997). Festiniog railway – A View from the Past. Ian Allan.
- —— (1997). The Heyday of the Welsh Narrow Gauge. Ian Allan.
- —— (1998). Isle of Man Steam Railway in Colour. Ian Allan.
- —— (1999). Welsh Narrow Gauge A View From the Past. Ian Allan.
- —— (1999). Portrait of the Welsh Highland Railway. Ian Allan.
- —— (2000). Welsh Narrow Gauge A Colour Portfolio. Ian Allan.
- —— (2002). An Illustrated History of the Welsh Highland Railway. Oxford Publishing Co.
- —— (2004). Immortal Rails (Vol 1) The Story of the Closure and Revival of the FR 1939–1983. Chester, England, CH4 9ZH: RailRomances. ISBN 1-900622-08-4.
- —— (2004). The Travelling Post Office 1838-2004. Royal Mail.
- —— (2005). Immortal Rails (Vol 2) The Story of the Closure and Revival of the FR 1939-1983. Chester, England, CH4 9ZH: RailRomances. ISBN 1-900622-09-2.
- —— (2007). An Illustrated History of the Festiniog Railway. Hersham: Oxford Publishing Co. ISBN 978-0-860936-03-9.
- —— (2008). An Illustrated History of the Shropshire & Montgomeryshire Light Railway. Oxford Publishing Company. ISBN 978-0860936190.
- —— (2009). An Illustrated History of the Travelling Post Office. Oxford Publishing Co. ISBN 978-0860936206.
- —— (2009). An Illustrated History of the Welsh Highland Railway 2nd edition. Oxford Publishing Co.
- —— (2010). An Illustrated History of the Snowdon Mountain Railway. Oxford Publishing Co.
- —— (2011). An Illustrated History of the Great Western Narrow Gauge. Oxford Publishing Co.
- —— (2013). The Cambrian Railways: A new history. Oxford Publishing Co.
- —— (2013). Narrow Gauge Railways. Oxford, UK: Shire Publications, Ltd. ISBN 978-0747812975.
- —— (2015). Narrow Gauge Lines of the British Isles. Ian Allan Publishing Ltd.
- —— (2017). Festiniog Railway: The Spooner Era and After 1830–1920. Pen & Sword Transport.
- —— (30 October 2017). Festiniog Railway. Volume 2: From Slate Railway to Heritage Operation 1921 – 2014. Pen and Sword.
- —— (August 2018). Rebuilding the Welsh Highland Railway. Pen & Sword Transport. ISBN 978-1473827271.
- —— (8 February 2019). The Corris Railway: The Story of a Mid-Wales Slate Railway. Pen & Sword Transport. ISBN 978-1526717535.
- —— (6 April 2020). The Vale of Rheidol Railway: The Story of a Narrow Gauge Survivor. Pen & Sword Transport. ISBN 978-1526718051.
- —— (6 August 2020). The Welshpool & Llanfair Light Railway The Story of a Welsh Rural Byway. Pen & Sword Transport. ISBN 978-1526744777.
- —— (8 February 2022). The Snowdon Mountain Railway. Pen & Sword Transport. ISBN 978-1526776099.
- —— (30 November 2022). Mail by Rail - The Story of the Post Office and the Railways. Pen & Sword Transport. ISBN 978-1526776143.
- —— (22 February 2024). The Shropshire & Montgomeryshire Light Railway The Rise and Fall of a Rural Byway. Pen & Sword Transport. ISBN 978-1526776174.
- —— (18 July 2024). The Tanat Valley Light Railway. Pen & Sword Transport. ISBN 978-1399039673.
- —— (10 March 2025). Cliff Railways An Historic Survey. Pen & Sword Transport. ISBN 978-1399048309.
