= P. J. G. Ransom =

British writer (1935–2019)

- Born: Philip John Greer Ransom; 24 September 1935
- Died: 27 March 2019 (aged 83)
- Occupation: Author
- Genre: Non-fiction

Philip John Greer Ransom, or John Ransom, (24 September 1935 – 27 March 2019) was a British non-fiction author, principally covering railway, canal and local history. He was also hon. secretary of the Scottish Committee of the Heritage Railway Association.

He died on 27 March 2019.

== Books ==
- Holiday Cruising in Ireland, David & Charles, 1971
- Railways Revived, Faber & Faber, 1973
- Waterways Restored, Faber & Faber, 1974
- Your Book of Canals, Faber & Faber, 1977
- The Archaeology of Canals, World's Work, 1979
- The Archaeology of Railways, World's Work, 1981
- Your Book of Steam Railway Preservation, Faber & Faber, 1982
- The Archaeology of the Transport Revolution 1750–1850, World's Work, 1984
- Transport in Scotland through the Ages, Richard Drew Publishing, 1987
- Scottish Steam Today, Richard Drew Publishing, 1989
- The Victorian Railway and How It Evolved, Heinemann, 1990
- Loch Earn: A Guide for Visitors, Particularly Those Going Afloat, author, 1994
- Narrow Gauge Steam – Its Origins and Worldwide Development, Oxford Publishing Co., 1996
- Scotland's Inland Waterways, NMS Publishing, 1999
- The Mont Cenis Fell Railway, Twelveheads Press, 1999
- Locomotion: Two Centuries of Train Travel, Sutton Publishing, 2001
- Snow, Flood and Tempest: Railways and Natural Disasters, Ian Allan Publishing, 2001
- Loch Lomond and the Trossachs in History and Legend, Birlinn, 2004
- Iron Road: The Railway in Scotland, Birlinn, 2007, 2013
- Steamers of Loch Lomond, Stenlake Publishing Ltd, 2007 (text researched and written to accompany pictures selected from publisher's collection)
- Old Loch Lomondside, Stenlake Publishing Ltd, 2007 (text researched and written to accompany pictures selected from publisher's collection)
- Old Almondbank, Methven and Glenalmond, Stenlake Publishing Ltd, 2010 (text researched and written to accompany pictures selected from publisher's collection)
- Old Arrochar and Loch Long, Stenlake Publishing Ltd, 2011 (text researched and written to accompany pictures selected from publisher's collection)
- Bell's Comet – How a Paddle Steamer Changed the Course of History, Amberley Publishing, 2012
- Old Dunkeld and Birnam, Stenlake Publishing Ltd, 2012 (text researched and written to accompany pictures selected from publisher's collection)
- Old Stanley, Stenlake Publishing Ltd, 2013 (text researched and written to accompany pictures selected from publisher's collection)

In addition contributed to the following multi-author works

- Steam into the Seventies, New English Library, 1976 (section on North York Moors Railway)
- Encyclopaedia of Railways, Octopus, 1977 (section on railway preservation)
- A Guide to the Steam Railways of Great Britain, Pelham Books, 1979 (section on Wales)
- Encyclopaedia of the History of Technology, Routledge, 1990 (section on railways)
- Biographical Dictionary of the History of Technology, Routledge, 1996 (79 short biographies of railway engineers)
- Oxford Companion to British Railway History, edited by Jack Simmons & Gordon Biddle, Oxford University Press, 1997 (12 articles)
- Oxford Dictionary of National Biography, Oxford University Press, 2004 (3 articles on railway engineers)
- Scottish Life and Society: A Compendium of Scottish Ethnology, vol. 8, Transport and Communications John Donald in association with European Ethnological Research Centre 2009 (Three chapters: Canals and Inland Waterways; Coaching; Railways to 1914).

== See also ==
- List of Old Etonians born in the 20th century
- List of Scottish writers
