= Allan Garraway =

Allan George Weldon Garraway MBE (14 June 1926 – 30 December 2014) was a British railway manager, responsible for restoring the abandoned Ffestiniog Railway in the 1950s. He was awarded an MBE in 1983.

== Early life ==
Garraway was born on 14 June 1926 in Cambridge. He was educated at The Leys School in Cambridge, but was evacuated with the school to Pitlochry during the Second World War. He studied at St Catharine's College, Cambridge and graduated in 1947.

== Military career ==
After leaving university, Garraway joined the Corps of Royal Engineers, and was posted to Germany, where he became the locomotive superintendent of the Detmold Military Railway and was promoted to the rank of captain.

== British Railways ==
After the end of his military service, Garraway joined British Railways, training as a locomotive engineer at Doncaster Works. He was later taken on as assistant to the Motive Power Superintendent of the Eastern Region of British Railways.

== Railway preservation ==
In 1950, Garraway was one of the initial group of volunteers who rescued the Talyllyn Railway. This was the first railway in the world to be run entirely by volunteers and started the railway preservation movement. The next year, he was one of the "Bristol group" of volunteers who proposed rescuing the Festiniog Railway which lay moribund about 20 miles north of the Talyllyn. By 1953, enough of the Festiniog Railway had been restored to start a public service, with the first train running on 23 July 1955.

In November 1954, Garraway was appointed the engineer of the Festiniog Railway. In June 1955, he left British Railways and became the full-time Manager and Engineer of the Festiniog. In 1958, he became the first general manager of the revived company. He regularly drove trains on the railway until 1974, usually on the footplate of Linda. He stepped down as general manager of the Festiniog in 1983, continuing as a consultant until 1986.

== Personal life ==
Garraway married Moira McMillan, on 23 October 1965. For a while they lived in a flat converted from an office in Porthmadog Harbour railway station, but later they moved to a bungalow in Minffordd. In 1986, the Garraways retired to Boat of Garten in Scotland.

Garraway died on 30 December 2014, three years after Moira.
