= Rhiw Goch =

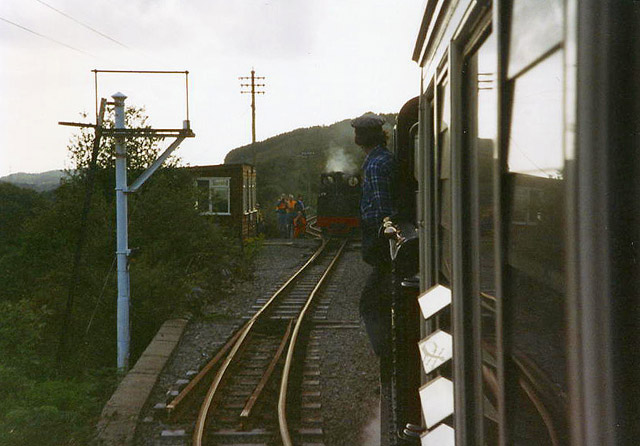
- Rhiw Goch passing loop in 1993

General information
- Location: Penrhyndeudraeth, Gwynedd; Wales
- Coordinates: 52.9414°N 4.0536°W
- Grid reference: SH621402
- System: Station on heritage railway
- Owner: Ffestiniog Railway
- Manager: Ffestiniog Railway

Key dates
- 1836: Opened
- 1863: Closed as a horse stabling point
- 1975: Re-opened as a passing loop
- 1989: Closed as a passing loop; remained as a siding
- 1999: Re-opened as a passing loop
- 2006: Signal box structure replaced
Location

Rhiw Goch is a passing point on the Ffestiniog Railway north of the village of Penrhyndeudraeth in Wales. It was originally a passing loop and an exchange point for the horses that worked the line, opening in 1836. Horses were stabled overnight at Rhiw Goch farm, which adjoins the line further south nearer to the village. When the railway converted to using steam locomotives in 1863, Rhiw Goch passing loop was no longer needed and was closed.

The passing loop was reinstated at Rhiw Goch in 1975. Its location, approximately equidistant from Minffordd and Tan-y-Bwlch stations, allows maximum flexibility in timetabling, permitting up and down trains to cross with minimum waiting. The location provides a long passing loop which accommodates full length Ffestiniog trains. This is the only former 'horse station' at which it is still possible to pass trains, although Cae Ednyfed, lies within the current Minfford station limits.

In 1989 the box was taken out of use, with the signal heads being removed and the token instrument from Tan-y-Bwlch, and the although trap points (from Minffordd) were installed at the Tan-y-Bwlch end of the loop, they were never commissioned. During this period, the ground frame was only usable as a refuge siding, and it was not possible to cross passenger trains.

In 1999 the box was recommissioned, with replacement signal heads being installed, the Tan-y-Bwlch end trap points were removed and new power cabling was installed.

Rhiw Goch has the only regularly staffed signal box on the railway and the 1974 vintage box was replaced by a new enlarged box during 2006/7. This included provision for the bats which have made the signal box their home.

Although trains regularly stop here to wait for a train travelling in the opposite direction to pass, passengers can not alight from or join trains here. There is no public access to Rhiw Goch except by train.

== Sources ==
- Boyd, James I.C. (1975) [1959]. The Festiniog Railway 1800 - 1974; Vol. 1 - History and Route. The British Narrow Gauge Railway. Blandford: The Oakwood Press. ISBN 978-0-85361-167-7. OCLC 2074549. B1A.
- Boyd, James I.C. (1975) [1959]. The Festiniog Railway 1800 - 1974; Vol. 2 - Locomotives and Rolling Stock; Quarries and Branches: Rebirth 1954-74. The British Narrow Gauge Railway. Blandford: The Oakwood Press. ISBN 978-0-85361-168-4. OCLC 874117875. B1B.
