= LNWR Claughton Class =

Class of four-cylinder 4-6-0 passenger locomotives

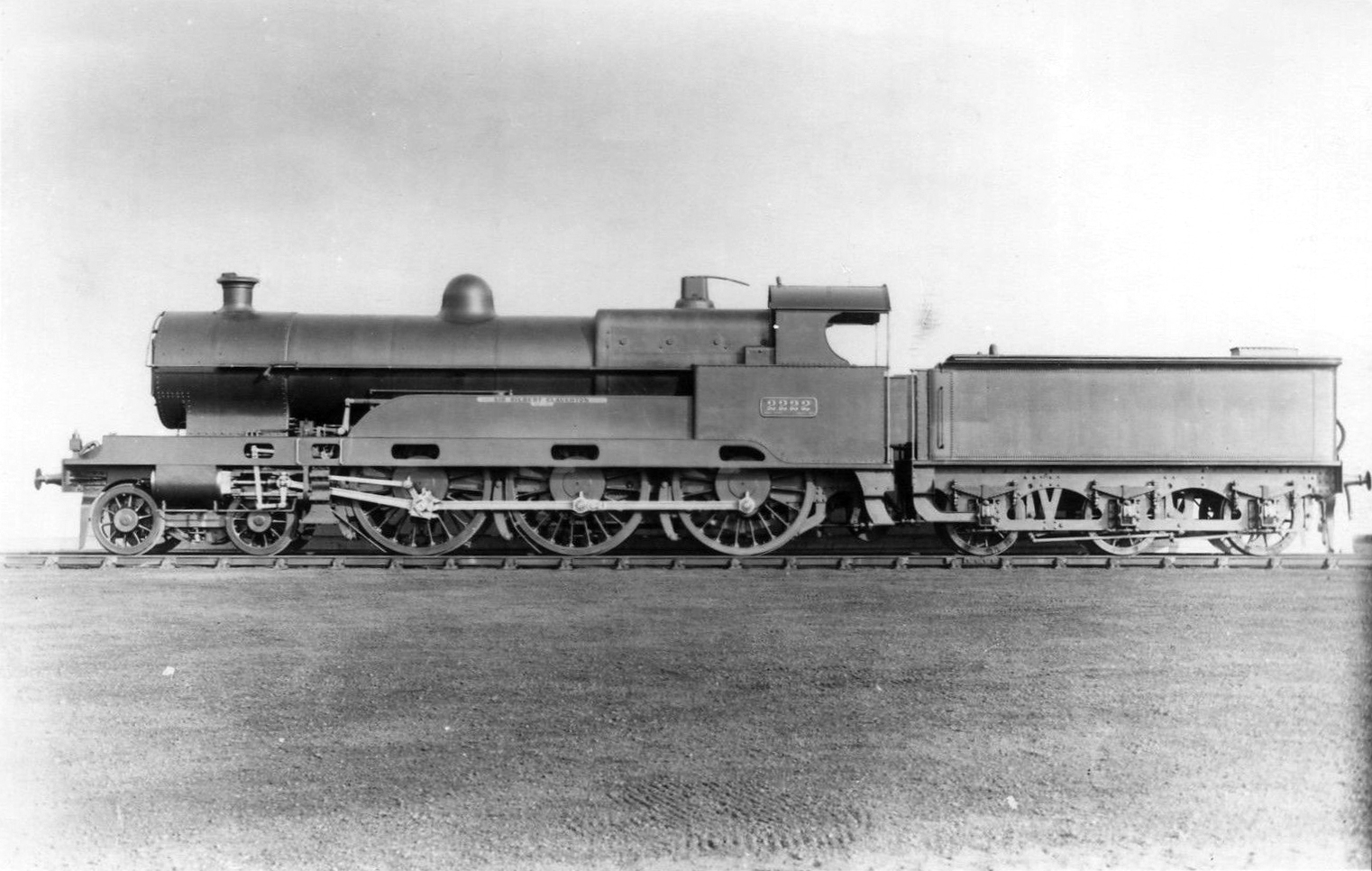
- No. 2222 Sir Gilbert Claughton in photographic grey
Type and origin
- Power type: Steam
- Designer: Charles Bowen Cooke
- Builder: Crewe Works
- Serial number: 5117, 5138–5146, 5227–5246, 5267–5296, 5502–5571
- Build date: 1913–1921
- Total produced: 130
Specifications
- Configuration
  - Whyte: 4-6-0
  - UIC: 2′C h4
- Gauge: 4 ft 8 1/2 in (1,435 mm)
- Leading dia.: 3 ft 3 in (0.991 m)
- Driver dia.: 6 ft 9 in (2.057 m)
- Loco weight: 77.75 long tons (79.00 t)
- Fuel capacity: Coal
- Boiler pressure: 175 lbf/in^{2} (1.21 MPa); 200 lbf/in^{2} (1.38 MPa) †‡
- Heating surface: 2,232 sq ft (207.4 square metres)
- Superheater: Schmidt
- Cylinders: Four
- Cylinder size: 15 3/4 in × 26 in (400 mm × 660 mm)
- Valve gear: Walschaerts; Beardmore-Caprotti ‡
- Valve type: Piston valve (locomotive)
- Loco brake: Vacuum brake
- Train brakes: Vacuum brake
Performance figures
- Tractive effort: 27,072 lbf (120.42 kN); 29,570 lbf (131.53 kN) †‡
Career
- Operators: London and North Western Railway; → London, Midland and Scottish Railway
- Power class: LMS: 5P, 5XP ‡†
- Withdrawn: 1929–1941, 1949
- Disposition: All scrapped

The London and North Western Railway (LNWR) Claughton Class was a class of 4-cylinder express passenger 4-6-0 steam locomotives.

== History ==
The locomotives were introduced in 1913, the first of the class No. 2222 was named in honour of Sir Gilbert Claughton, who was the Chairman of the LNWR at that time. A total of 130 were built, all at Crewe Works up to 1921. Author Brian Reed points out that weight restrictions and equipment limitations at Crewe limited the size of the boiler, hence engine power. Cylinder design and valve events were not optimal, so the Claughton Class was a mediocre performer on the track.

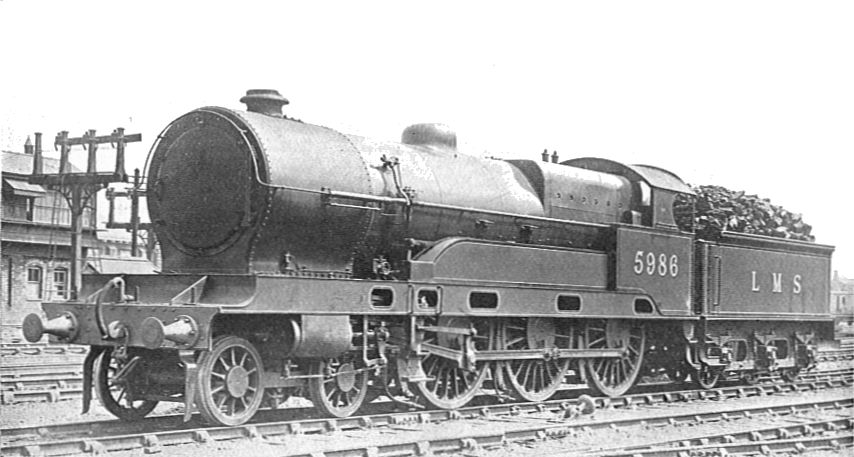
LMS No. 5986 c.1928, with enlarged boiler

The LNWR reused numbers and names from withdrawn locomotives, with the result that the numbering was completely haphazard. An exception was made for the LNWR's war memorial locomotives. There were two of these: No. 2097 (built in 1917) was briefly named Patriot for a short period in January 1920; and the name was later given to a new locomotive numbered 1914, which entered service in May 1920 (ordinarily, this locomotive would have been numbered 69, which had been unused since January 1920; but instead, Renown Class locomotive No. 1914 was renumbered 1257 in order to release its old number). The nameplates of both locomotives also bore the inscription "In Memory of the Fallen L & N W R Employees 1914–1919". Remembrance Day ceremonies at Rugby featured no. 1914 until its name was transferred to LMS Patriot Class No. 5500. The LMS renumbered them into the more logical series 5900–6029, No. 1914 becoming 5964. Twenty were rebuilt by the LMS with larger boilers, and ten of these had Caprotti valve gear. Twelve others were rebuilt as the initial engines of the Patriot Class, though not much material was reused.

With the introduction of the LMS Royal Scot Class in 1927, the Claughtons' main work had been taken away and many were transferred to the Midland Division. At the end of 1937, all but four, Nos. 5946, 6004, 6017 and 6023, had been withdrawn. These were retained in service until further repair became unworthwhile; three of them were withdrawn in 1940–41, leaving No. 6004, which was regularly used to haul fitted freight trains between London and Edge Hill, becoming increasingly dirty. Inherited by British Railways in 1948, it was allocated the BR number 46004 but was withdrawn in 1949 without it being applied. None were preserved.

== Accidents and incidents ==
- On 12 February 1929, locomotive No. 5977 was hauling an express passenger train that was in a head-on collision with a freight train, hauled by LMS Fowler 4F 0-6-0 No. 4491, at Doe Hill station, Derbyshire. The driver and fireman of the express were killed.
- On 6 March 1930, locomotive No. 5971 was hauling a passenger train that departed from Culgaith station, Cumberland against signals. It subsequently collided with a ballast train, hauled by Midland Railway 3835 Class 0-6-0 No. 4009 at Langwathby. Two people were killed and four were seriously injured.
- On 13 March 1935, locomotive No. 5946 was hauling an express freight train which stopped in the section between Nash Mills and King's Langley signalboxes, Hertfordshire due to an engine defect. A milk train, hauled by LMS Compound 4-4-0 No. 1165, ran into the rear of it due to a signalman's error. Two other freight trains, one hauled by LMS Patriot Class 4-6-0 No. 5511 and the other hauled by LMS Class 7F 0-8-0 No. 9598, collided with the wreckage. One person was killed.

== Details ==
LNWR No.	Crewe Works No.	LMS No.	Date built	Name	Date Named	Withdrawn	Notes
2222	5117	5900	January 1913	Sir Gilbert Claughton	From new	March 1935	
1161	5138	5901	May 1913	Sir Robert Turnbull	From new	May 1933	
1191	5139	5902	May 1913	Sir Frank Ree	From new	November 1930	
1319	5140	5907	May 1913	Sir Frederick Harrison	From new	January 1933	
1327	5141	5908	May 1913	Alfred Fletcher	From new	September 1936	‡
21	5142	5903	June 1913	Duke of Sutherland	From new	April 1933	
163	5143	5904	June 1913	Holland Hibbert	From new	December 1934	
650	5144	5905	June 1913	Lord Rathmore	From new	February 1933	
1159	5145	5906	July 1913	Ralph Brocklebank	From new	February 1937	†
2046	5146	5909	June 1913	Charles N. Lawrence	From new	February 1935	
250	5227	5910	August 1914	J. A. Bright	From new	April 1937	†
260	5228	5911	August 1914	W. E. Dorrington	From new	March 1934	
1131	5229	5912	August 1914	Lord Faber	From new	February 1935	
1429	5230	5913	September 1914	Colonel Lockwood	From new	August 1934	
2239	5231	5918	September 1914	Frederick Baynes	From new	March 1935	
209	5232	5914	September 1914	J. Bruce Ismay	From new	December 1934	
668	5233	5915	September 1914	Rupert Guinness	From new	November 1934	
856	5234	5916	September 1914	E. Tootal Broadhurst	From new	December 1932	
1567	5235	5917	October 1914	Charles J. Cropper	From new	September 1934	
2401	5236	5919	October 1914	Lord Kitchener	From new	September 1934	
511	5337	5920	July 1916	George Macpherson	From new	April 1935	
695	5338	5921	July 1916	Sir Arthur Lawley	From new	November 1934	
968	5239	5922	July 1916	Lord Kenyon	From new	September 1934	
1093	5340	5923	July 1916	Guy Calthrop	From new	June 1935	Sir Guy Calthrop from March 1919
1345	5341	5924	August 1916	James Bishop	From new	September 1934	
2174	5342	5925	August 1916	E. C. Trench	From new	May 1933	
2204	5343	5926	August 1916	Sir Herbert Walker K.C.B.	From new	January 1933	
2221	5344	5927	August 1916	Sir Francis Dent	From new	December 1936	‡
2338	5345	5928	August 1916	Charles H. Dent	From new	January 1934	
2395	5346	5929	September 1916	J. A. F. Aspinall	From new	March 1935	
37	5367	5930	February 1917	G. R. Jebb	From new	October 1934	
154	5368	5931	March 1917	Captain Fryatt	From new	March 1934	
155	5369	5932	March 1917	I. T. Williams	From new	April 1935	Sir Thomas Williams from December 1919
162	5370	5933	March 1917			December 1932	
186	5371	5934	March 1917			January 1935	
713	5372	5935	March 1917			February 1933	
1334	5373	5936	April 1917			August 1932	
2042	5374	5937	April 1917			November 1934	
2097	5375	5938	April 1917			February 1935	
2230	5376	5939	May 1917	Clio	July 1922	June 1935	
1019	5377	5940	May 1917	Columbus	February 1922	September 1934	
1355	5378	5941	May 1917			August 1934	
2366	5379	5942	May 1917			August 1932	
2373	5980	5943	May 1917	Tennyson	January 1922	August 1934	
2411	5381	5944	June 1917			February 1933	
2420	5382	5945	June 1917	Ingestre	January 1923	April 1934	
2427	5383	5946	June 1917	Duke of Connaught	January 1922	February 1941	‡
2431	5384	5947	June 1917			February 1935	
2445	5385	5948	July 1917	Baltic	March 1923	April 1937	‡
2450	5386	5949	July 1917			August 1932	
116	5387	5950	July 1917			October 1934	
159	5388	5951	August 1917			October 1935	
171	5389	5952	August 1917			December 1932	
986	5390	5953	August 1917	Buckingham	March 1922	September 1936	†
1085	5391	5954	August 1917			December 1932	
1103	5392	5955	September 1917			May 1935	
2122	5393	5956	September 1917			March 1934	
2368	5394	5957	September 1917			February 1936	‡
2416	5395	5958	September 1917			October 1932	
2426	5396	5959	October 1917			June 1932	
1914	5502	5964	January 1920	Patriot; In memory of the Fallen LNWR Employees 1914-1919	From new	May 1935	
69	5503	5960	January 1920			March 1934	
178	5504	5961	January 1920			October 1934	
194	5505	5962	January 1920			December 1935	‡
972	5506	5963	January 1920			December 1932	
1177	5507	5966	January 1920	Bunsen	March 1922	October 1932	
2179	5508	5969	January 1920			September 1934	
2499	5509	5970	February 1920	Patience	August 1922	December 1935	†
2511	5510	5971	February 1920	Croxteth	January 1923	December 1930	Locomotive badly damaged in head-on collision between Culgaith and Langwathby on 6 March 1930.
1599	5511	5968	February 1920	John O’Groat	August 1922	January 1935	
484	5512	5965	February 1920			September 1934	
1407	5513	5967	February 1920	L./Cpl. J. A. Christie, V.C.	February 1922	November 1934	
1726	5514	5972	March 1920			May 1937	†
1741	5515	5973	March 1920			December 1932	
1747	5516	5974	March 1920			August 1932	
2035	5517	5976	March 1920	Private E. Sykes, V.C.	February 1922	March 1935	Name transferred to 6015 in April 1926
2083	5518	5977	March 1920			April 1929	Locomotive badly damaged in head-on collision near Doe Hill station on 12 February 1929.
2231	5519	5978	March 1920			May 1934	
2268	5520	5979	March 1920	Frobisher	August 1922	April 1934	
12	5521	5975	April 1920	Talisman	January 1923	May 1937	‡
85	5522	5980	April 1920			January 1935	
98	5523	5981	April 1920			June 1934	
103	5524	5982	April 1920			November 1932	
201	5525	5983	April 1920			October 1932	
499	5526	5984	May 1920			October 1935	
808	5527	5985	May 1920			June 1932	
1092	5528	5986	May 1920			November 1935	†
1096	5529	5987	May 1920			August 1932	
1097	5530	5988	May 1920	Private W. Wood, V.C.	February 1922	May 1935	Name transferred to 6018 in April 1926
1133	5531	5989	May 1920			November 1934	
2059	5532	5991	May 1920	C. J. Bowen-Cooke	October 1920	February 1935	
1326	5533	5990	June 1920			April 1935	
2090	5534	5992	June 1920			October 1932	
2095	5535	5993	June 1920			May 1936	†
2101	5536	5998	June 1920			August 1934	
6	5537	5994	June 1920			June 1935	
8	5538	5995	June 1920			June 1935	
10	5539	5996	July 1920			February 1933	
11	5540	5997	July 1920			March 1933	
13	5541	5999	July 1920	Vindictive	July 1922	June 1937	† Renumbered 2430 in October 1922. Name removed in August 1936.
15	5542	6000	June 1920			March 1933	
23	5543	6001	August 1920			October 1934	
30	5544	6002	August 1920	Thalaba	December 1922	September 1934	
32	5545	6003	August 1920			October 1934	
42	5546	6004	August 1920	Princess Louise	February 1922	April 1949	† Name removed in June 1935, BR Number never applied.
36	5547	6005	August 1920			August 1932	
68	5548	6006	August 1920			December 1932	
102	5549	6007	August 1920			October 1934	
110	5550	6008	September 1920	Lady Godiva	May 1923	December 1932	
119	5551	6009	September 1920			December 1934	
149	5552	6010	March 1921			August 1932	
150	5553	6011	March 1921	Illustrious	May 1923	February 1933	
152	5554	6012	March 1921			August 1932	
156	5555	6013	March 1921			March 1936	‡
157	5556	6014	April 1921			September 1934	
158	5557	6015	April 1921	Private E. Sykes, V.C.	April 1926	March 1933	Name transferred from 5976 in April 1926
161	5558	6016	April 1921			January 1935	
169	5559	6017	April 1921	Breadalbane	March 1923	October 1940	†
179	5560	6018	April 1921	Private W. Wood, V.C.	April 1926	February 1933	Name transferred from 5988 in April 1926
180	5561	6019	April 1921	Llewellyn	April 1923	December 1934	
183	5562	6020	May 1921			July 1935	
192	5563	6021	May 1921	Bevere	July 1923	February 1934	
205	5564	6022	May 1921			January 1933	
207	5565	6023	May 1921	Sir Charles Cust	December 1921	July 1941	‡
208	5566	6024	May 1921			March 1935	
210	5567	6025	May 1921			August 1935	
211	5568	6026	June 1921			December 1932	
517	5569	6027	June 1921			January 1933	
1216	5570	6028	June 1921			September 1934	
1220	5571	6029	June 1921			December 1935	‡

- † Locomotives fitted with larger boilers from 1928.
- ‡ Locomotives fitted with Caprotti valve gear and larger boilers from 1928.
