= LMS Patriot Class =

Class of British locomotives

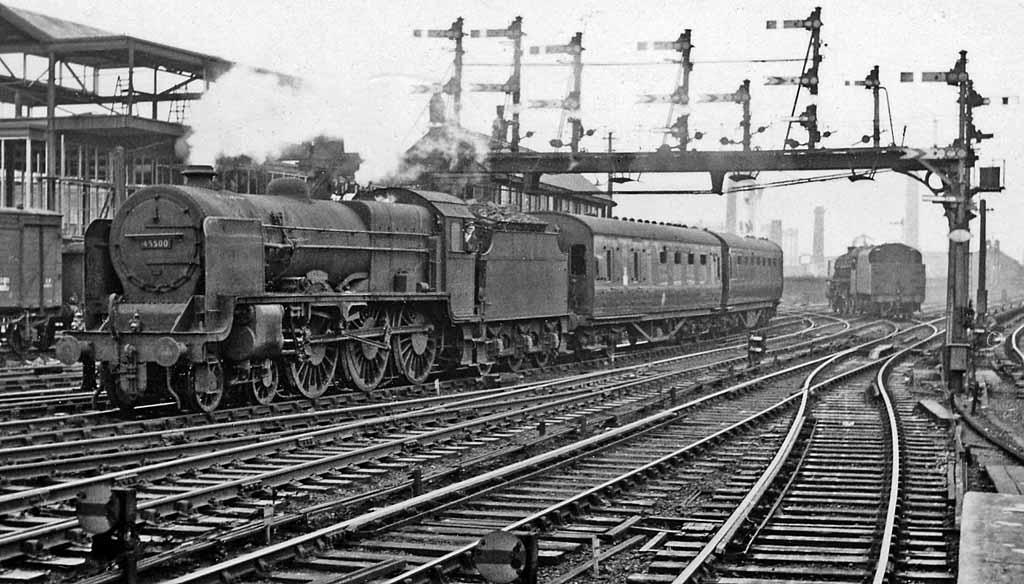
- 45500 Patriot at Manchester Victoria, 1960.
Type and origin
- Power type: Steam
- Designer: Sir Henry Fowler
- Builder: LMS Crewe Works - (42); LMS Derby Works - (10)
- Build date: 1930–1934
- Total produced: 52
Specifications
- Configuration
  - Whyte: 4-6-0
  - UIC: 2′C h3
- Gauge: 4 ft 8 1/2 in (1,435 mm) standard gauge
- Leading dia.: 3 ft 3 in (0.991 m)
- Driver dia.: 6 ft 9 in (2.06 m)
- Length: 62 ft 8 3/4 in (19.120 m)
- Loco weight: 80.75 long tons (82.05 t; 90.44 short tons)
- Tender weight: 42.70 long tons (43.39 t; 47.82 short tons)
- Total weight: 123.45 long tons (125.43 t; 138.26 short tons)
- Fuel type: Coal
- Fuel capacity: 5.5 long tons (5.6 t; 6.2 short tons)
- Water cap.: 3,500 imp gal (16,000 L; 4,200 US gal)
- Firebox
  - Grate area: 30 1/2 sq ft (2.83 m^{2})
- Boiler: G9½S
- Boiler pressure: 200 psi (1.4 MPa)
- Heating surface
  - Firebox: 183 sq ft (17.0 m^{2})
  - Tubes and flues: 1,552 sq ft (144.2 m^{2})
- Superheater
  - Heating area: 365 sq ft (33.9 m^{2})
- Cylinders: 3
- Cylinder size: 18 in × 26 in (457 mm × 660 mm)
- Valve gear: Walschaerts
- Valve type: Piston valves
- Train brakes: Vacuum
Performance figures
- Tractive effort: 26,520 lbf (118.0 kN)
Career
- Operators: London, Midland and Scottish Railway; → British Railways
- Power class: 1930–51: 5XP; 1951–65: 6P5F
- Numbers: LMS (1934): 5500–5551; BR: 45500–45551
- Withdrawn: 1960–1965
- Disposition: Original 52 scrapped; replica under construction

The Patriot Class is a class of 52 express passenger steam locomotives built for the London Midland and Scottish Railway. The first locomotive of the class was built in 1930 and the last in 1934. The class was based on the chassis of the Royal Scot combined with the boiler from Large Claughtons earning them the nickname Baby Scots. A total of 18 were rebuilt to create the LMS Rebuilt Patriot Class between 1946 and 1948; thereafter those not subjected to rebuilding were often referred to as the Unrebuilt Patriot Class. These remaining 34 unrebuilt engines were withdrawn between 1960 and 1962.

== Overview ==
The first two were rebuilt in 1930 from the 1912-built LNWR Large Claughton Class, retaining the original driving wheels with their large bosses, the "double radial" bogie truck and some other parts. Of the subsequent 50 locomotives of the class 40 were nominal rebuilds of Claughtons, being in fact new builds classified as rebuilt engines so that they could be charged to revenue accounts, rather than capital. The last ten were classified as new builds.

The two former Claughtons retained their original numbers until 1934, when they were renumbered 5500–1. The 40 built as replacements took the numbers of the Claughtons that they replaced; these were renumbered 5502–41 in 1934. The remainder of the class were allocated nos. 6030–9, but were numbered 5542–51 from new. The numbering of the similar LMS Jubilee Class continued on from where the Patriots left off. This was because 5552–5556 were ordered as Patriots (to be numbered 6040–4) but built with taper boilers as Jubilees on the orders of Sir William Stanier.

Naming of the class was somewhat erratic. Some retained old Claughton names, whilst others continued the military associations of the names Patriot and St Dunstans, and 13 carried names of holiday resorts served by the LMS. Seven remained unnamed, although they had been allocated names in 1943.

Many of the 52 members of the Patriot Class spent the bulk of their working careers in England, primarily on the West Coast Main Line. Most of them were stationed at the Crewe North and Carlisle Upperby, though a few were stationed at Edge Hill, Bushbury, Camden, Willesden, Carlisle Kingmoor and other locations in the area. They were primarily used as express engines, but were later tasked with occasional mixed traffic work once the diesel engines arrived on the network.

=== Rebuilding ===
Between 1946 and 1949, eighteen members were rebuilt with Stanier 2A boiler, cab and tender, though again these were largely paper rebuilds, based on the LMS Rebuilt Royal Scot Class. Seven (Nos 5514/21/6/9-31/40) had been rebuilt by the start of 1948 when British Railways inherited the remaining 45 Baby Scots. In March 1948 BR added 40000 to their numbers to number them 45500–13/15-20/2-5/7/8/32-9/41-51. Subsequently, BR rebuilt another 11, so that the rebuilt engines were (4)5512/14/21–23/25–32/34–36/45. The two original members of the class, and the first ten of the nominal rebuilds, were not rebuilt due to their non-standard parts.

Year	Number rebuilt	Numbers
1946	2	5521/30
1947	5	5514/26/9/31/40
1948	10	45512/23/5/7/8/32/4-6/45
1949	1	45522
Total	18	

== Details ==
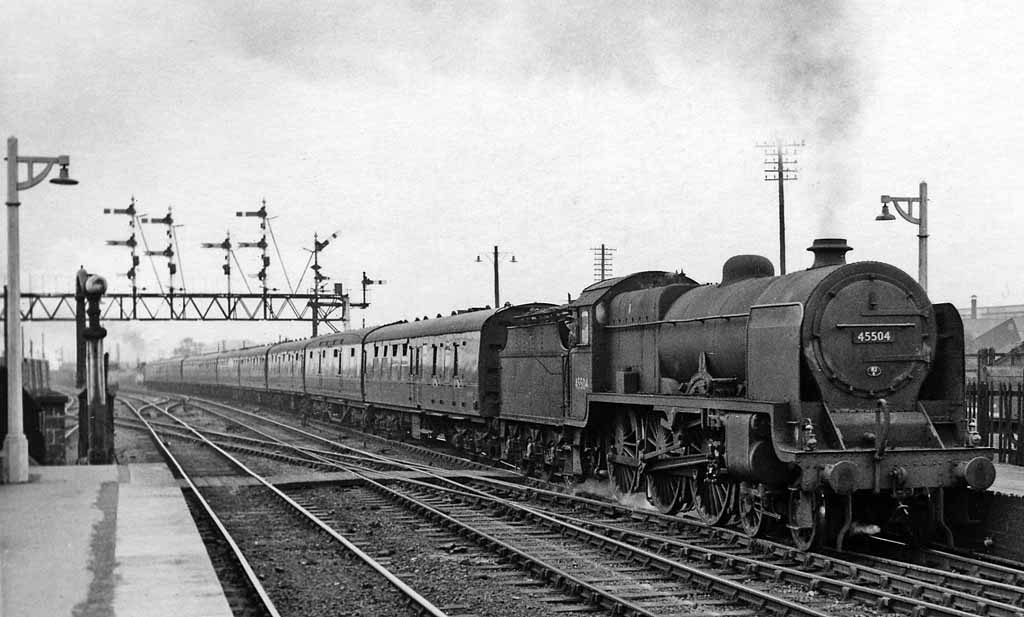
5504 Royal Signals was built in 1932 and was originally numbered 5987 as a paper rebuild of an LNWR Claughton Class. Later renumbered 5504 and was named in 1937, finally becoming BR No. 45504, in which condition it is pictured at Bromsgrove. It was withdrawn in 1962 without ever being rebuilt.

Note some never received BR numbers as unrebuilt engines because they were rebuilt by the LMS. In the table below BR numbers for BR-rebuilt engines are given, but some engines may not have received BR numbers while in an unrebuilt condition as renumbering took several years (sources should indicate these).

Full stock list table
Pre- 1934 LMS No.	Post 1934 LMS No.	BR No.	Name(s) (dates)	Built	Works	Rebuilt	Withdrawn	Notes
5971	5500	45500	Croxteth (until 1937); Patriot (Feb. 1937)	November 1930	Derby		March 1961	
5902	5501	45501	Sir Frank Ree (until 1937); St. Dunstans (1937)	November 1930	Derby		September 1961	
5959	5502	45502	Royal Naval Division (1937)	July 1932	Crewe		September 1960	
5985	5503	45503	The Leicestershire Regiment (1938); The Royal Leicestershire Regiment (Nov. 1948).	July 1932	Crewe		August 1961	
5987	5504	45504	Royal Signals (1937)	July 1932	Crewe		March 1962	
5949	5505	45506	The Royal Army Ordnance Corps (1947)	August 1932	Crewe		June 1962	
5974	5506	45506	The Royal Pioneer Corps (Sep. 1948)	August 1932	Crewe		March 1962	
5936	5507	45507	Royal Tank Corps (1937)	August 1932	Crewe		October 1962	
6010	5508	45508		August 1932	Crewe		November 1960	Fitted with stovepipe chimney in 1956.
6005	5509	45509	The Derbyshire Yeomanry (1951)	August 1932	Crewe		August 1961	
6012	5510	45510		August 1932	Crewe		June 1962	
5942	5511	45511	Isle of Man (1938)	September 1932	Crewe		February 1961	
5966	5512	45512	Bunsen	September 1932	Crewe	July 1948	n/a	
5958	5513	45513		September 1932	Crewe		September 1962	1943 name allocated: Sir W.A. Stanier.
5983	5514	n/a	Holyhead (1938)	September 1932	Crewe	March 1947	n/a	
5992	5515	45515	Caernarvon (1939)	October 1932	Crewe		June 1962	
5982	5516	45516	The Bedfordshire and Hertfordshire Regiment. (1938)	October 1932	Crewe		August 1961	
5952	5517	45517		February 1933	Crewe		June 1962	
6006	5518	45518	Bradshaw (1939)	February 1933	Crewe		October 1962	
6008	5519	45519	Lady Godiva	February 1933	Crewe		March 1962	
5954	5520	45520	Llandudno (1937)	February 1933	Derby		May 1962	
5933	5521	n/a	Rhyl (1937)	March 1933	Derby	November 1946	n/a	
5973	5522	45522	Prestatyn (1939)	March 1933	Derby	January 1949	n/a	
6026	5523	45523	Bangor (1938)	March 1933	Crewe	October 1948	n/a	
5907	5524	45524	Sir Frederick Harrison (until 1937); Blackpool (1937)	March 1933	Crewe		September 1962	
5916	5525	45525	E. Tootal Broadhurst (until 1937); Colwyn Bay (1937)	March 1933	Derby	August 1948	n/a	
5963	5526	n/a	Morecambe and Heysham (1937)	March 1933	Derby	February 1947	n/a	
5944	5527	45527	Southport (1937)	April 1933	Derby	September 1948	n/a	
5996	5528	45528		April 1933	Derby	September 1948	n/a	
5926	5529	n/a	Sir Herbert Walker K.C.B. (until 1937)	April 1933	Crewe	July 1947	n/a	
6022	5530	n/a	Sir Frank Ree (1937)	April 1933	Crewe	October 1946	n/a	Name transferred from 5501.
6027	5531	n/a	Sir Frederick Harrison (1937)	April 1933	Crewe	December 1947	n/a	Name transferred from 5524.
6011	5532	45532	Illustrious	April 1933	Crewe	June 1948	n/a	
5905	5533	45533	Lord Rathmore	April 1933	Derby		September 1962	
5935	5534	45534	E. Tootal Broadhurst (1937)	April 1933	Crewe	December 1948	n/a	Name transferred from 5525.
5997	5535	45535	Sir Herbert Walker K.C.B. (1937)	May 1933	Derby	September 1948	n/a	Name transferred from 5529.
6018	5536	45536	Private W. Wood V.C. (1936)	May 1933	Crewe	November 1948	n/a	
6015	5537	45537	Private E. Sykes V.C.	July 1933	Crewe		June 1962	
6000	5538	45538	Giggleswick (1938)	July 1933	Crewe		September 1962	
5925	5539	45539	E. C. Trench	July 1933	Crewe		September 1961	
5901	5540	n/a	Sir Robert Turnbull	August 1933	Crewe	October 1947	n/a	
5903	5541	45541	Duke of Sutherland	August 1933	Crewe		June 1962	
	5542	45542		March 1934	Crewe		June 1962	
	5543	45543	Home Guard (1940)	March 1934	Crewe		November 1962	
	5544	45544		March 1934	Crewe		November 1962	
	5545	45545		March 1934	Crewe	November 1948	n/a	
	5546	45546	Fleetwood (1938)	March 1934	Crewe		June 1962	
	5547	45547		April 1934	Crewe		September 1962	
	5548	45548	Lytham St. Annes (1937)	April 1934	Crewe		June 1962	
	5549	45549		April 1934	Crewe		June 1962	1943 name allocated: R.A.M.C.
	5550	45550		May 1934	Crewe		November 1962	1943 name allocated: Sir Henry Fowler
	5551	45551		May 1934	Crewe		June 1962	Replica of original engine under construction. Replica to be named "The Unknown Warrior", original engine never named.

== Accidents and incidents ==
- On 13 March 1935, a milk train, hauled by LMS Compound 4-4-0 No. 1165, was in a rear-end collision with an express freight train, hauled LNWR Claughton Class 4-6-0 No. 5946, at King's Langley, Hertfordshire due to a signalman's error. No. 5511 was hauling a freight train that collided with the wreckage. A coal train hauled by LMS Class 7F 0-8-0 No. 9598 then ran into the wreck. 1 person was killed.
- On 16 October 1939, No. 5544 was hauling a train that was in a collision with another train at Winwick Junction, Cheshire and was derailed.
- On 13 October 1940, No. 5529 was hauling an express passenger train that collided with a platform barrow obstructing the line at Wembley Central station, Middlesex and was derailed. Several people were killed and many more were injured.

== Withdrawal ==
All of the unrebuilt Patriots were withdrawn between 1960 and 1962 in accordance with the BR Modernisation Plan.

Year	Quantity in service at start of year	Quantity withdrawn	Locomotive numbers
1960	34	2	45502/08
1961	32	8	45500–01/03/09/11/16/39/44
1962	24	24	45504–07/10/13/15/17–20/24/33/37–38/41–43/46–51

== New Build ==
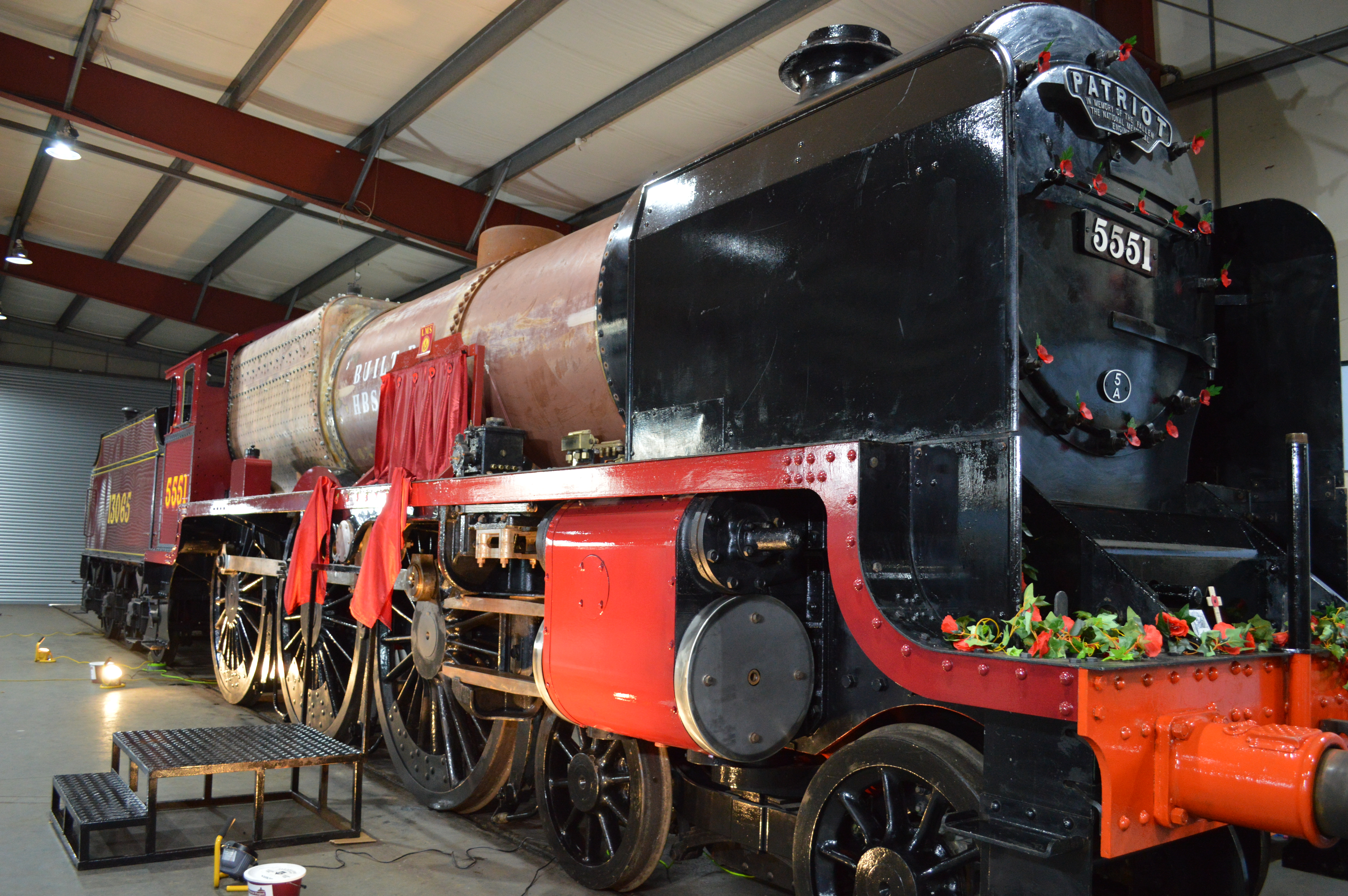
Replica under construction.

No Patriot in either rebuilt or unrebuilt form survived into preservation; however, a replica of no.5551 is under construction. The LMS-Patriot Project, a registered charity, is building a replica which will carry the number of the last built – LMS number 5551 or British Railways number 45551. It will be named The Unknown Warrior.

== In fiction ==
This class of engine forms the basis of the Big City Engine from the Railway Series of children's books by the Rev. W. Awdry.

== Models ==
Both Hornby and Bachmann have produced OO gauge models.

Hornby first introduced an original Patriot in the 1979 catalogue that has remained in production and now forms part of the 'Railroad' budget (i.e. toy) range. The following models have been produced:

Product Ref.	Number	Name	Livery
R308	5533	Lord Rathmore	LMS crimson lake, with smoke deflectors
R311	5541	Duke of Sutherland	LMS crimson lake, with smoke deflectors
R324	45519	Lady Godiva	BR black, lined, BRITISH RAILWAYS lettering
R357 (1979)	5541	Duke of Sutherland	LMS crimson lake
R578	45537	Private E Sykes VC	BR Brunswick green, early logo
R2182	45515	Caernarvon	BR Brunswick green, late logo
R2182A	5539	E.C. Trench	LMS crimson lake, with smoke deflectors
R2208	45514	Holyhead	LMS crimson lake, with smoke deflectors
R2633	45545	Planet	BR Brunswick green, late logo
R2634	45512	Bunsen	BR Brunswick green, early logo
R2726	45536	Private W Wood VC	BR Brunswick green, early logo
R2936	5532	Illustrious	LMS crimson lake, with smoke deflectors
R3154	45539	E.C. Trench	BR Brunswick green, late logo
R3278	45518	Bradshaw	BR Brunswick green, early logo

Bachmann Industries make a more up-to-date tooling of the original Patriot, also in OO gauge. The following models have been produced:

Product Ref.	Number	Name	Livery
31-210	45503	The Royal Leicestershire Regiment	BR Brunswick green, early logo
31-211	45543	Home Guard	BR Brunswick green, late logo
31-212	5541	Duke of Sutherland	LMS crimson lake, with smoke deflectors)
31-213	45504	Royal Signals	BR Brunswick green with late logo
31-214	45538	Giggleswick	BR Brunswick green with early logo
31-215	Replica 5551	The Unknown Warrior	Preserved LMS crimson lake with smoke deflectors, as will be preserved

== Bibliography ==
- Earnshaw, Alan (1990). Trains in Trouble: Vol. 6. Penryn: Atlantic Books. ISBN 0-906899-37-0.
- Hall, Stanley (1990). The Railway Detectives. London: Ian Allan. ISBN 0-7110-1929-0.
- Longworth, Hugh (2005). British Railway Steam Locomotives 1948-1968. ISBN 0-86093-593-0.
- Nock, O. S. Royal Scots and Patriots of the LMS.
- Rowledge, J.W.P. (1975). Engines of the LMS built 1923–51. Oxford: Oxford Publishing Company. ISBN 0-902888-59-5.
- Toms, George; Essery, R.J.; James, F. (2006). Historical Locomotive Monographs No. 3: Claughton & Patriot 4-6-0s. Didcot: Wild Swan. ISBN 1-905184-19-0.
- Whiteley, John S.; Morrison, Gavin W. (1997). The Power of the Patriots. Oxford Publishing Company. ISBN 0-86093-232-X.
