= LMS Rebuilt Patriot Class =

Class of 18 British 3-cylinder 4-6-0 locomotives

Rebuilt Patriot Class
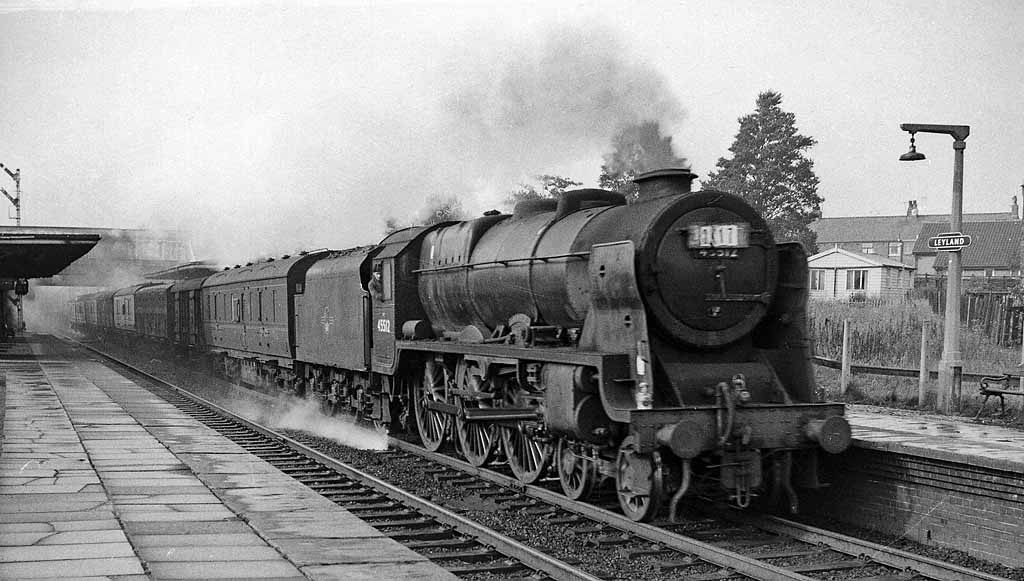
- 45512 Bunsen with a parcels train at Leyland in 1963.
Type and origin
- Only differences from the LMS Patriot Class are shown
- Power type: Steam
- Rebuild date: 1946–1949
- Number rebuilt: 18
Specifications
- Loco weight: 82.00 long tons (83.32 t; 91.84 short tons)
- Tender weight: 54.65 long tons (55.53 t; 61.21 short tons)
- Total weight: 136.65 long tons (138.84 t; 153.05 short tons)
- Fuel capacity: 9 long tons (9.1 t; 10 short tons)
- Water cap.: 4,000 imp gal (18,000 L; 4,800 US gal)
- Firebox
  - Grate area: 31 1/4 sq ft (2.90 m^{2})
- Boiler: 2A
- Boiler pressure: 250 lbf/in^{2} (1.72 MPa)
- Heating surface
  - Firebox: 195 sq ft (18.1 m^{2})
  - Tubes and flues: 1,667 sq ft (154.9 m^{2})
- Superheater
  - Heating area: 348–367 sq ft (32.3–34.1 m^{2})
- Cylinder size: 17 in × 26 in (432 mm × 660 mm)
Performance figures
- Tractive effort: 29,570 lbf (131.53 kN)
Career
- Power class: 6P; 7P from 1951
- Axle load class: BR: Route Availability 9
- Withdrawn: 1961–1965
- Disposition: All scrapped

The London Midland and Scottish Railway (LMS), Rebuilt Patriot Class was a class of 4-6-0 steam locomotives. They were rebuilt from LMS Patriot Class locomotives (which were the fourth type of LMS 2A boilered 4-6-0 locomotives) over the period 1946–1949. By the end of 1947, the LMS had rebuilt seven engines, these being 5514/21/26/29–31/40. After nationalisation, a further eleven locomotives were rebuilt. Rebuilt locomotives retained their numbers.

== Rebuilding ==
Between 1946 and 1949 eighteen LMS Patriot Class engines were rebuilt with Stanier 2A boiler, cab and tender, though these were largely paper rebuilds, based on the LMS Rebuilt Royal Scot Class. Seven (Nos 5514/21/6/9-31/40) had been rebuilt by the start of 1948 when British Railways inherited them. In March 1948 BR added 40000 to their numbers to number them 45514/21/6/9-31/40. Subsequently, BR rebuilt another 11 of the Patriots, so that the rebuilt engines were (4)5512/14/21–23/25–32/34–36/45. The two original members of the class, and the first ten of the nominal rebuilds, were not rebuilt due to their non-standard parts.

Year	Number rebuilt	Numbers
1946	2	5521/30
1947	5	5514/26/9/31/40
1948	10	45512/23/5/7/8/32/4-6/45
1949	1	45522
Total	18	

== Details ==
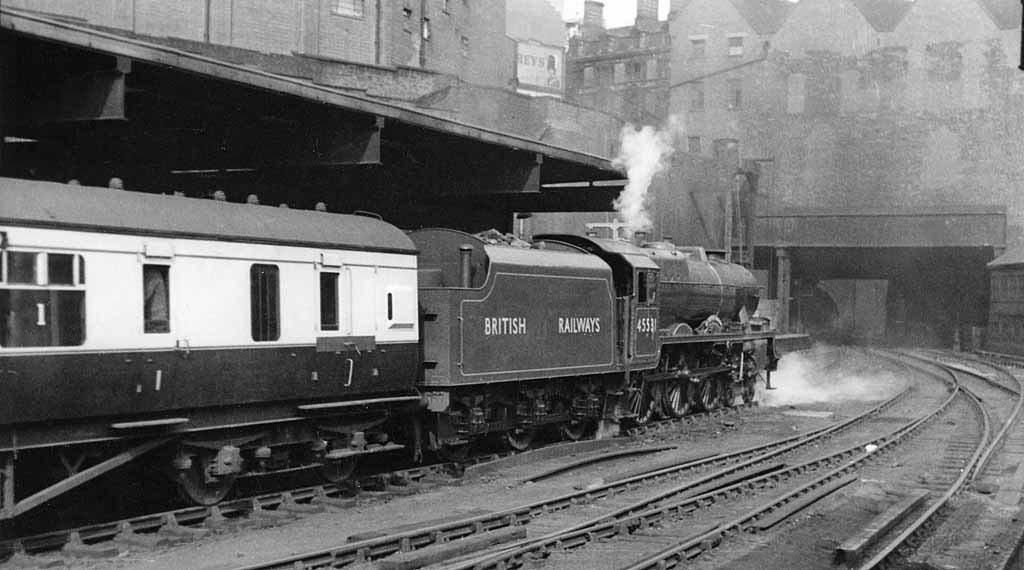
45531 Sir Frederick Harrison in BR experimental green livery and without smoke deflectors at Birmingham New Street in 1948.

Details of the engines as rebuilt are given below. Note that this only shows LMS numbers as carried by rebuilt engines of the LMS.

LMS No.	BR No.	Name	Builder	Built	Rebuilt	Withdrawn	Notes
—	45512	Bunsen	Crewe	September 1932	July 1948	Mar 1965	
5514	45514	Holyhead	Crewe	September 1932	March 1947	May 1961	First to be withdrawn
5521	45521	Rhyl	Derby	March 1933	November 1946	Sept 1963	
—	45522	Prestatyn	Derby	March 1933	January 1949	Sept 1964	
—	45523	Bangor	Crewe	March 1933	October 1948	Jan 1964	
—	45525	Colwyn Bay	Derby	March 1933	August 1948	May 1963	
5526	45526	Morecambe and Heysham	Derby	March 1933	February 1947	Oct 1964	
—	45527	Southport	Derby	April 1933	September 1948	Dec 1964	
—	45528	R.E.M.E. (September 1959)	Derby	April 1933	September 1948	Jan 1963	
5529	45529	Stephenson	Crewe	April 1933	July 1947	Feb 1964	
5530	45530	Sir Frank Ree	Crewe	April 1933	October 1946	Jan 1965	
5531	45531	Sir Frederick Harrison	Crewe	April 1933	December 1947	Oct 1965	Last to be withdrawn
—	45532	Illustrious	Crewe	April 1933	June 1948	Feb 1964	
—	45534	E. Tootal Broadhurst	Crewe	April 1933	December 1948	May 1964	
—	45535	Sir Herbert Walker K.C.B.	Derby	May 1933	September 1948	Oct 1963	
—	45536	Private W. Wood V.C.	Crewe	May 1933	November 1948	Dec 1962	
5540	45540	Sir Robert Turnbull	Crewe	August 1933	October 1947	Apr 1963	
—	45545	Planet	Crewe	March 1934	November 1948	May 1964	

== Withdrawal ==
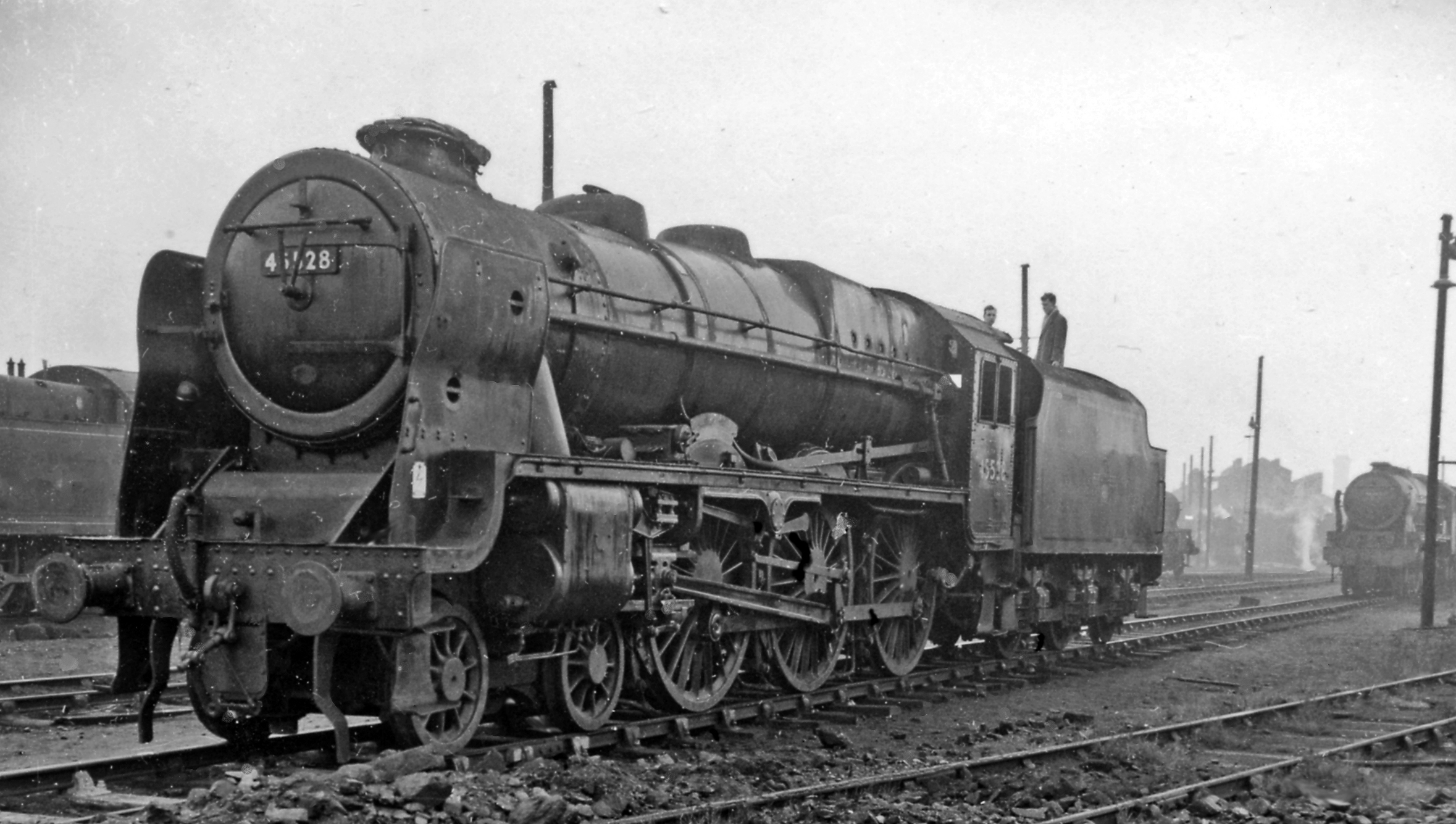
45528 R.E.M.E. in November 1962, stored just prior to withdrawal.

The rebuilt Patriots were withdrawn between 1961 and 1965 in accordance with the BR Modernisation Plan and none were preserved.

Year	Quantity in service at start of year	Quantity withdrawn	Locomotive numbers
1961	18	1	45514
1962	17	1	45536
1963	16	5	45521/25/28/35/40
1964	11	8	45522–23/26–27/29/32/34/45
1965	3	3	45512/30–31
