= Ernest Sykes (VC) =

Recipient of the Victoria Cross (1885-1949)

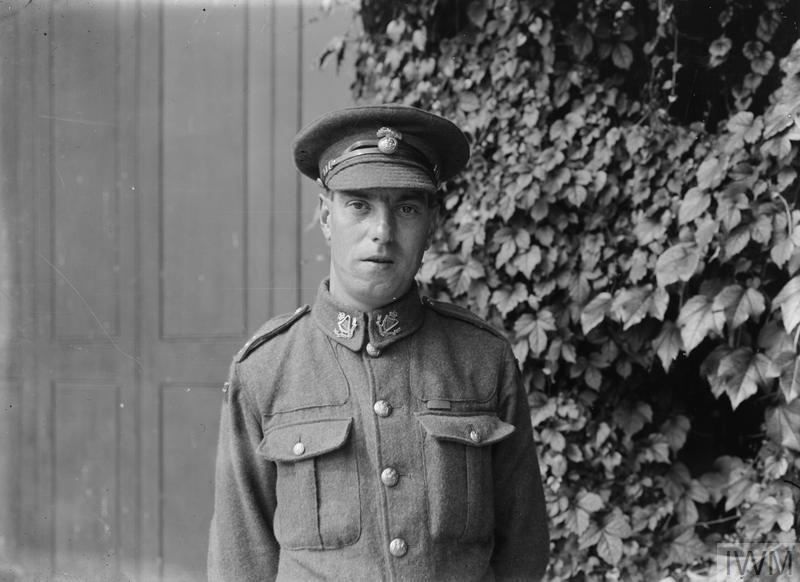
- Sykes during World War I
- Born: 4 April 1885; Mossley, England
- Died: 3 August 1949 (aged 64); Lockwood, West Riding of Yorkshire, England
- Burial place: Woodfield Cemetery, Lockwood
- Military career
- Allegiance: United Kingdom
- Branch: British Army
- Service years: 1915–1918
- Rank: Private
- Units: Duke of Wellington's Regiment; Northumberland Fusiliers; Home Guard
- Conflicts: World War I World War II
- Awards: Victoria Cross

Ernest Sykes VC (4 April 1885 – 3 August 1949) was an English recipient of the Victoria Cross, the highest and most prestigious award for gallantry in the face of the enemy that can be awarded to British and Commonwealth forces.

== VC action ==
Sykes was 32 years old, and a private in the 27th (Service) Battalion (4th Tyneside Irish), Northumberland Fusiliers, British Army during the First World War when the following deed took place on Easter Monday, 9 April 1917 near Arras, France, for which he was awarded the VC. His battalion in attack was held up by intense fire from front and flank, and suffered heavy casualties. Private Sykes, despite this heavy fire, went forward and brought back four wounded. He then made a fifth journey and remained out under conditions which appeared to be certain death, until he had bandaged all those too badly injured to be moved.

His VC citation reads:

No. 40989 Pte. Ernest Sykes, North'd Fus. For most conspicuous bravery and devotion to duty when his battalion in attack was held up about 350 yards in advance of our lines by intense fire from front and flank, and suffered heavy casualties. Pte. Sykes, despite this heavy fire, went forward and brought back four wounded—he made a fifth journey and remained out under conditions which appeared to be certain death, until he had bandaged all those who were too badly wounded to be moved. These gallant actions, performed under incessant machine gun and rifle fire, showed an utter contempt of danger.

During the Second World War Sykes returned to serve with the 25th Battalion West Riding Home Guard.

His Victoria Cross is displayed at the Fusiliers Museum of Northumberland, Alnwick, Northumberland, England.

== Commemoration ==
In January 1922 the London and North Western Railway named Claughton-class locomotive No. 2035 Private E. Sykes, V.C. in his honour. In 1923 the LNWR amalgamated with other railways to create the London, Midland and Scottish Railway (LMS), and this locomotive was moved away from the Manchester area in April 1926, at which time the name was transferred to another Manchester-based locomotive of the same class, LNWR no. 158. It was given the LMS number 6015 in May 1926. It was withdrawn from service in March 1933, and its replacement built in July 1933, a LMS Patriot Class steam locomotive carrying the same number, was named after him. This was itself renumbered 5537 in June 1934. It was given the British Railways number 45537 in May 1948. It was finally withdrawn in June 1962, and scrapped in September 1962. The brass nameplate from the locomotive is on display at the Northumberland Fusiliers' Museum at Alnwick Castle in Northumberland.

Sykes is honoured by a Tameside Metropolitan Borough Council blue plaque erected in 1996 at the George Lawton Hall in his home town of Mossley, Greater Manchester. A second plaque was erected in 2004 at his workplace of Mossley railway station.

== Bibliography ==
- Gliddon, Gerald (2012) [1998]. Arras and Messines 1917. VCs of the First World War. The History Press. ISBN 978-0-7524-6604-0.
- Ross, Graham (1995). Scotland's Forgotten Valour. MacLean Press. ISBN 978-1899272006.
