= Edward Baylies Thornhill =

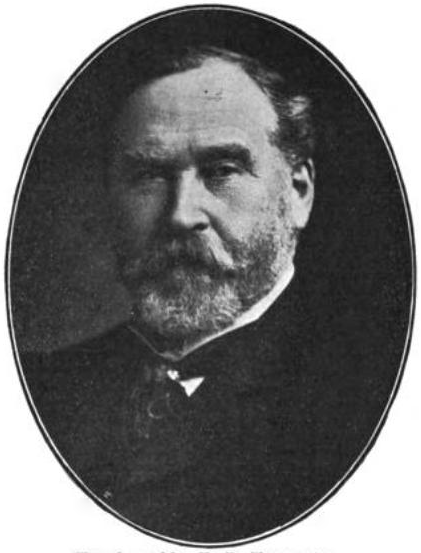
- Born: 11 June 1841; St James West, Middlesex, England
- Died: 31 August 1911 (aged 70); Colwyn Bay, Caernarvonshire, Wales
- Education: King's College London
- Occupation: Civil engineer
- Spouse: Mary Elizabeth Walker (m. 1873)
- Children: 10

Major Edward Baylies Thornhill M.Inst.C.E (11 June 1841 - 31 August 1911) was chief engineer of the London and North Western Railway from 1902 to 1909.

== Family ==
He was born on 11 June 1841 in St James West, Middlesex, the son of Walter Thornhill (1806-1887) and Sophia Turner (1811-1879).

On 25 September 1873 he married Mary Elizabeth Walker (1854-1945) in St Saviour's Church, Paddington and they had the following children:

- Walter Edward Thornhill (1874-1950)
- Ethel Sophie Mary Eleanor Thornhill (1875-1876)
- Henry Langton Thornhill (1877-1945)
- Margorie Thornhill (1878-1971)
- Violet Constance Thornhill (1880-1977)
- Frederick Baylies Thornhill (1882-1957)
- John Albert Thornhill (1884-1970)
- Charles Hope Thornhill (1886-1956)
- Geoffrey Holland Thornhill (1888-1917)
- Mildred Mary Thornhill (1892-1977)

He died on 31 August 1911 in Colwyn Bay, Caernarvonshire.

== Career ==
He was educated at King's College London and then served a pupilage with William Pole MICE.

He entered the service of the London and North Western Railway in September 1862. Shortly after joining he was appointed a resident engineer and one of his first projects was the widening of the railway between Edge Hill and Lime Street Station in Liverpool, the enlargement of Liverpool Lime Street railway station and a new dock at Garston.

He was appointed a Member of the Institution of Civil Engineering in 1870.

In 1879 he was appointed chief assistant to the company for all new works under the Chief Engineer Frank Stevenson.

In 1893 he was appointed to the rank of Major in the Engineer and Railway Staff Corps.

On the death of Frank Stevenson in 1902, he succeeded to the post of Chief Engineer. In this role he designed the widening into Euston station, the Wilmslow and Levenshulme new railway; the widening into Manchester London Road station and the construction of another dock at Garston.

Business positions
Preceded by Francis Stevenson	Chief Civil Engineer of the London and North Western Railway; 1902–1909	Succeeded by Ernest Crosbie Trench
