= Dorrington =

Dorrington may refer to:

== Places ==
- Dorrington, California, a census-designated place in Calaveras County, California
- Dorrington, Shropshire, a village in Shropshire
  - Dorrington railway station, closed in 1958
- Dorrington Lane, a hamlet in northeast Shropshire
- Dorrington, Lincolnshire, a village in Lincolnshire
- It may also refer to Doddington, Northumberland, sometimes known as Dorrington.

== People ==
- Albert Dorrington (1871-1953), British writer
- Alfie Dorrington (born 2005), English footballer
- Annie Dorrington (1866-1926), Australian painter
- Art Dorrington (b. 1930), ice hockey player
- Charles Dorrington, Canadian Anglican bishop
- Graham Dorrington, English aeronautical engineer
- Grant Dorrington (b. 1948), football administrator
- Jack Dorrington (1881-1944), English football goalkeeper
- Joe Dorrington, English football goalkeeper
- John W. Dorrington (1843–1916), American newspaper editor and politician
- Paul Dorrington, English guitarist
- Theophilus Dorrington (1654-1715), Church of England clergyman
- William Dorrington (died 1718) English army officer and Jacobite
- William E. Dorrington (1852-1926), railway manager
