= Robert Turnbull (railway manager) =

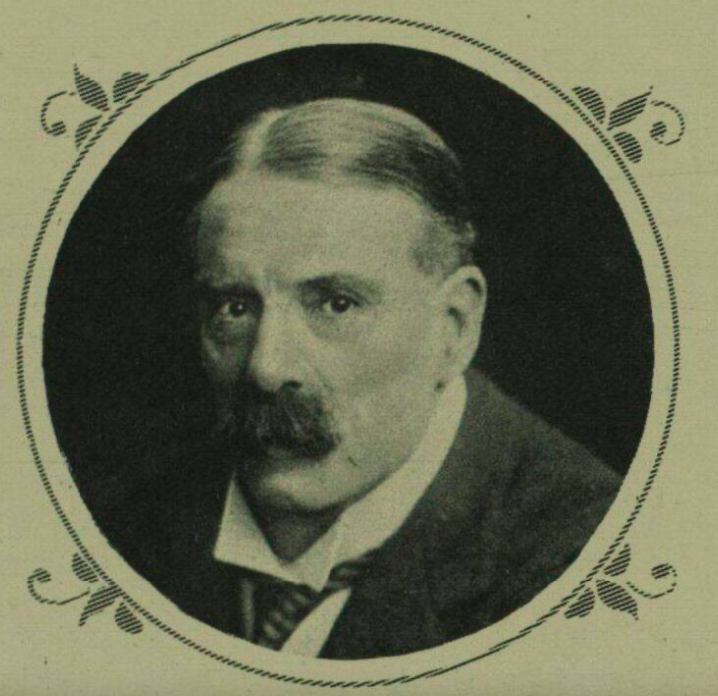
From the Illustrated London News 28 February 1925

Sir Robert Turnbull MVO (21 February 1852 – 22 February 1925) was a British railway manager. He joined the London and North Western Railway (LNWR) in 1868 and became its General Manager in 1914. He was made a member of the Royal Victorian Order in the 1911 New Year Honours and knighted in 1913. He served as a lieutenant colonel in the Engineer and Railway Staff Corps.

A Claughton Class locomotive, LNWR No. 1161 (LMS No. 5901) was named after him, this underwent a paper rebuild to LMS Patriot Class No. 5901, from 1934 later 5540, which was in turn rebuilt into a LMS Rebuilt Patriot Class No. 5540, BR No. 45540.

== Sources ==
- http://www.ukwhoswho.com/view/article/oupww/whowaswho/U204008

Business positions
Preceded by Frank Ree	General Manager of the London and North Western Railway; 1914	Succeeded by Guy Calthrop
