= Wilfred Wood =

English soldier, recipient of the Victoria Cross

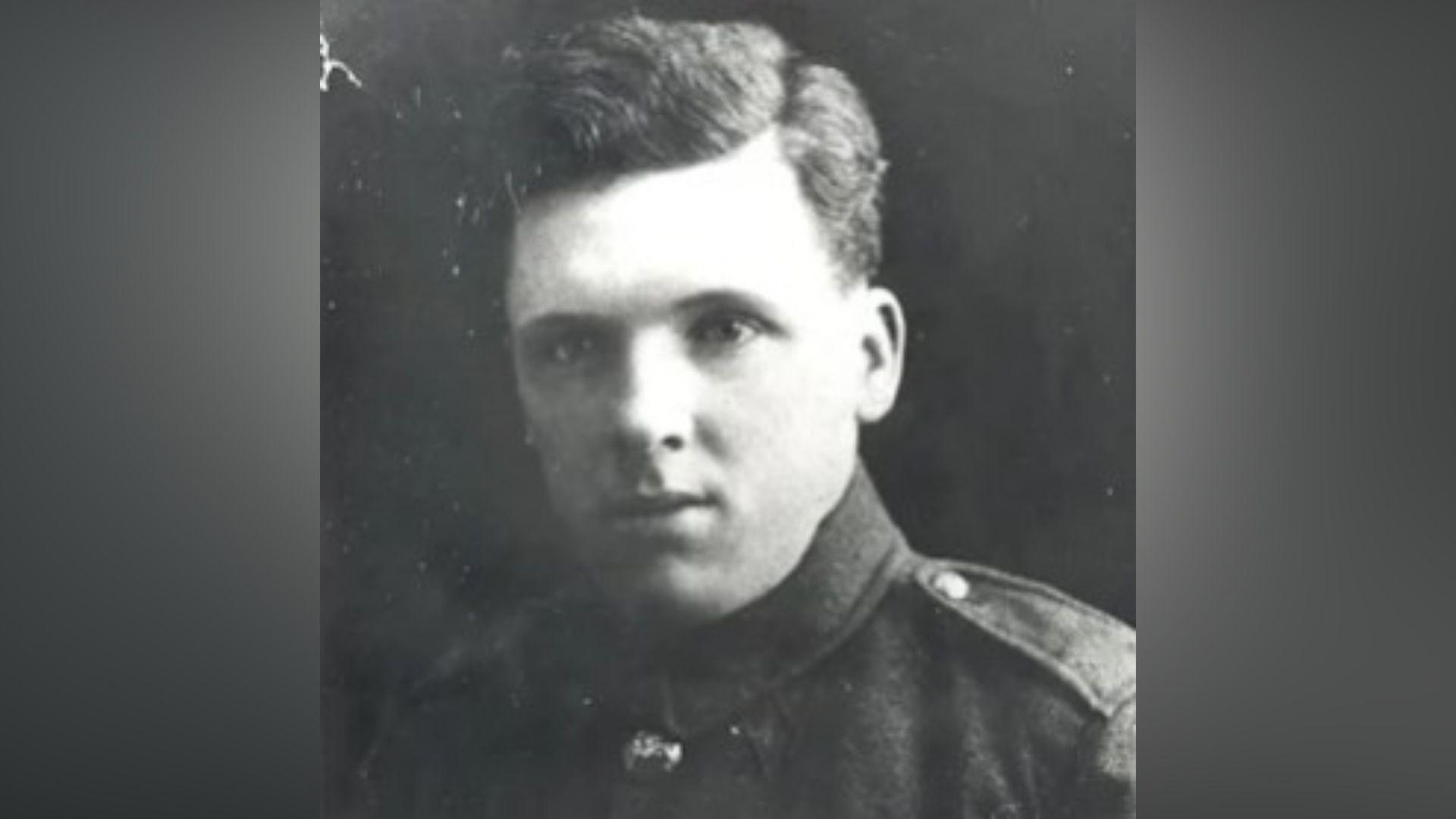
- Wood in army uniform
- Born: 2 February 1897; Stockport, Cheshire
- Died: 3 January 1982 (aged 84); Stockport
- Military career
- Allegiance: United Kingdom
- Branch: British Army
- Service years: 1916–1919
- Rank: Private
- Units: The Northumberland Fusiliers
- Conflicts: Battle of Vittorio Veneto (World War I)
- Awards: Victoria Cross
- Other work: Locomotive driver

Wilfred Wood VC (2 February 1897 – 3 January 1982) was an English recipient of the Victoria Cross (VC), the highest and most prestigious award for gallantry in the face of the enemy that can be awarded to British and Commonwealth forces. The VC was awarded for his actions on the Italian front against Austro-Hungarian forces in the First World War.

== Details ==
Wood worked as a railway shed cleaner when the First World War broke out. He enlisted with the Cheshire Regiment, British Army, and became a stretcher bearer.

He was 21 years old, and a private, transferred to the 10th Battalion, The Northumberland Fusiliers, when the following deed took place at the battle of Vittorio Veneto for which he was awarded the VC:

For most conspicuous bravery and initiative on 28 October 1918, near Casa Van, Italy, when a unit on the right flank having been held up by hostile machine guns and snipers, Pte. Wood, on his own initiative, worked forward with his Lewis gun, enfiladed the enemy machine-gun nest, and caused 140 enemy to surrender.

The advance was continued till a hidden machine gun opened fire at point blank range. Without a moment's hesitation Pte. Wood charged the machine gun, firing his Lewis gun from the hip at the same time. He killed the machine-gun crew, and without further orders pushed on and enfiladed a ditch from which three officers and 160 men subsequently surrendered.

The conspicuous valour and initiative of this gallant soldier in the face of intense rifle and machine-gun fire was beyond all praise.

After the war, he returned to his pre-war job on the railways, qualifying first as a fireman, then as an engine driver. He retired in 1960 as a supervisor. He died on 3 January 1982, aged 84, and was cremated at Stockport Crematorium five days later.

A LNWR Claughton Class locomotive, no. 1097, was named after him in January 1922. In 1923 the LNWR amalgamated with other railways to create the London, Midland and Scottish Railway (LMS), and this locomotive was moved away from the Manchester area in April 1926, at which time the name was transferred to another Manchester-based locomotive of the same class, LNWR no. 179. It was given the LMS number 6018 in January 1928. It was withdrawn from service in February 1933, and its replacement built in May 1933, a LMS Patriot Class steam locomotive carrying the same number, was named after him. This was itself renumbered 5536 in April 1934. British Railways (BR) rebuilt it with a taper boiler in November 1948 when it was given the BR number 45536. It was finally withdrawn in December 1962, and scrapped in March 1964. After withdrawal, the nameplate resided inside Norbury Primary School in Hazel Grove until it was donated to the Fusiliers Museum of Northumberland.

He is commemorated by a plaque outside Stockport railway station and is the subject of a BBC Manchester radio programme. The JD Wetherspoon pub in Hazel Grove is named after him.

His VC medal is owned privately.

== See also ==
- Monuments to Courage (David Harvey, 1999)
- The Register of the Victoria Cross (This England, 1997)

== Bibliography ==
- Gliddon, Gerald (2005). The Sideshows. VCs of the First World War. Gloucestershire, England: Sutton Publishing. ISBN 978-0-7509-2084-1.
