= Guy Calthrop =

British railway manager

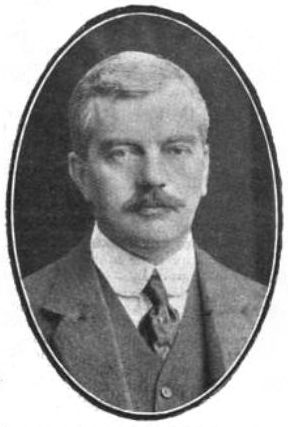
- In The Railway News, 8 June 1918
- Born: 26 March 1870; Uppingham, Rutland, England
- Died: 23 February 1919 (aged 48); London, England
- Occupation: Railway manager

Sir Calthrop Guy Spencer Calthrop, 1st Baronet (26 March 1870 – 23 February 1919) was a British railway manager.

== Biography ==
Born in Uppingham, Rutland, his brother was Everard Calthrop, railway engineer. He entered the London and North Western Railway (LNWR) as a Cadet at the age of 16 in 1886. In 1892 he was appointed outdoor assistant to the Superintendent of the Line at Euston, and in 1894. In 1901 he became personal assistant to Sir Frederick Harrison. However, in 1902 Calthrop left the LNWR to take up a position as General Superintendent of the Caledonian Railway, and in 1908 was promoted to General Manager. In 1910 Calthrop left Britain to become General Manager of the Buenos Aires and Pacific Railway.

In 1913 Calthrop returned to Britain and the LNWR, where he was appointed General Manager of the LNWR in succession to Sir Robert Turnbull in 1914. During the First World War, Calthrop was seconded by the Government, who appointed him Controller of Mines. For this service, Calthrop was made a baronet of Croxley House, Hertfordshire in 1918. He died less than a year later however on 23 February 1919, and his baronetcy became extinct upon his death.

Business positions
Preceded by ?	General Manager of the Caledonian Railway; 1908–1910	Succeeded by ?
Preceded by ?	General Manager of the Buenos Aires and Pacific Railway; 1910–1913	Succeeded by ?
Preceded by Sir Robert Turnbull	General Manager of the London and North Western Railway; 1914–1919	Succeeded by I. Thomas Williams
Baronetage of the United Kingdom
New creation	Baronet (of Croxley House); 1918–1919	Extinct
