= George Findlay (railway manager) =

Sir George Findlay
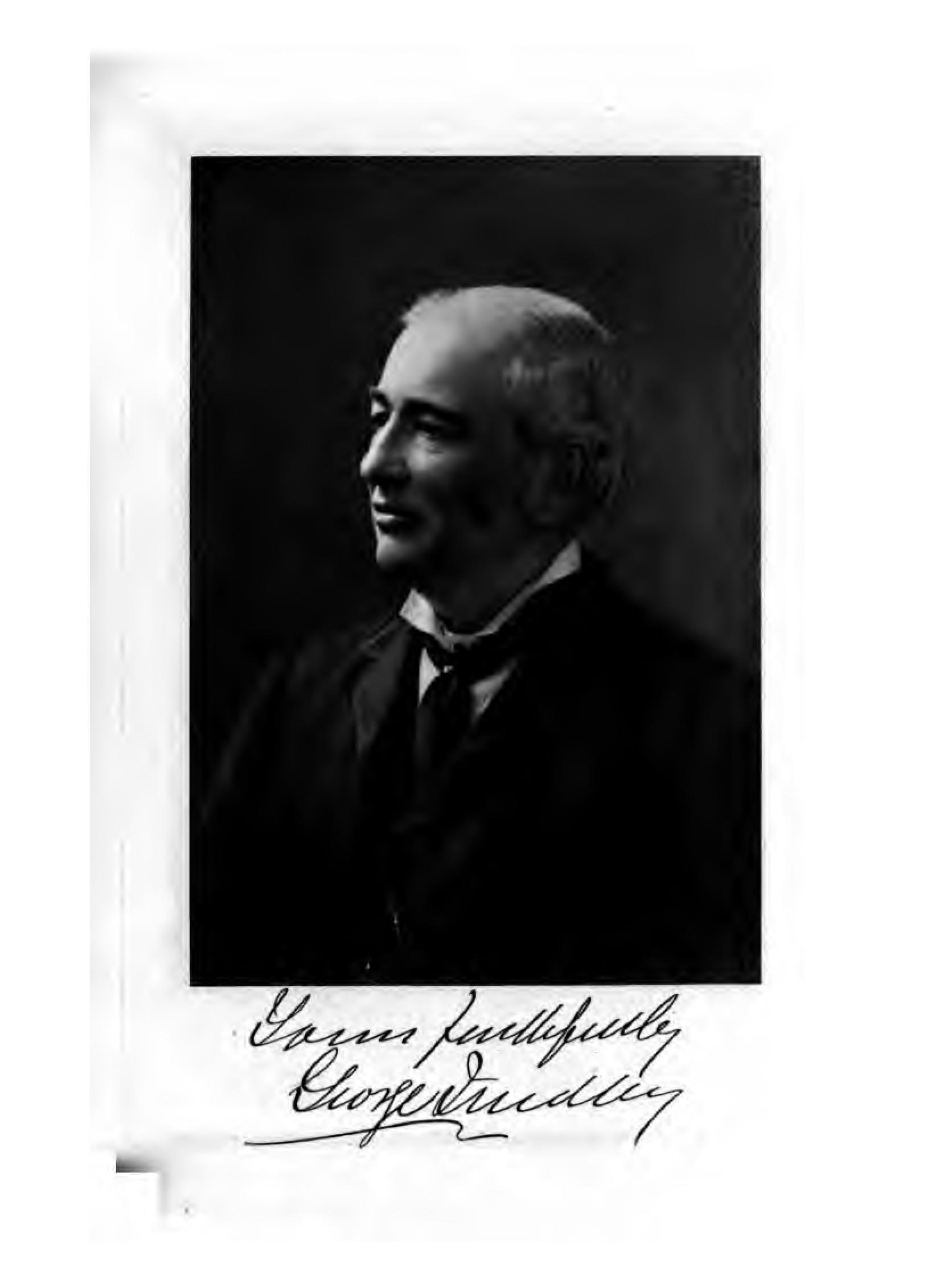
- Born: 18 May 1829; Rainhill, Lancashire
- Died: 26 March 1903 (aged 73); Edgware, Middlesex
- Years active: 1847–1903
- Title: General manager of the LNWR
- Term: 1874–1903
- Predecessor: William Cawkwell
- Successor: Frederick Harrison
- Spouse: Annie Adamson (m. 1847; died 1883) Charlotte Jacob (m. 1885)
- Children: 8

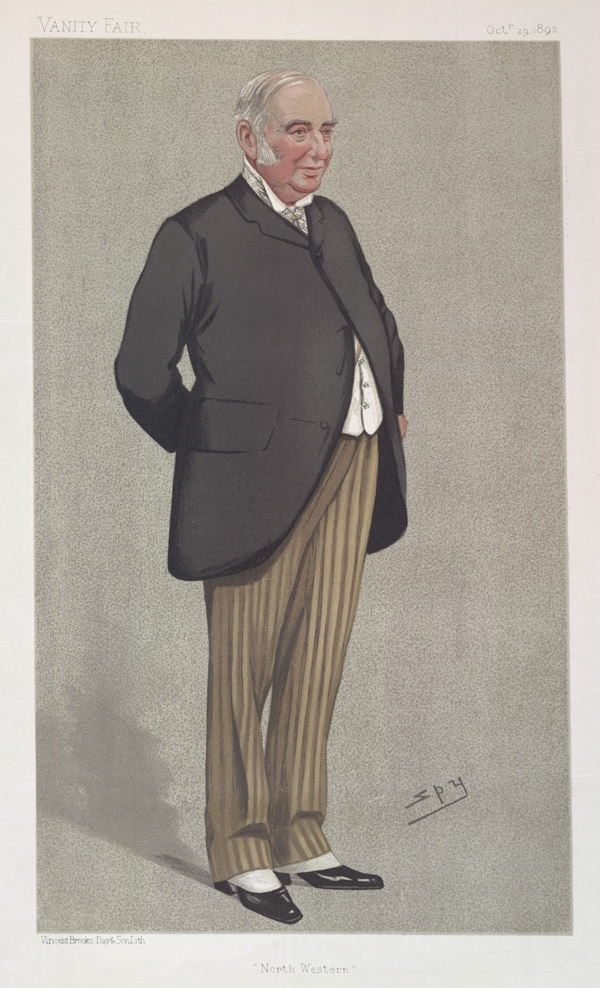
Caricature in Vanity Fair, 1892-10-29

Sir George Findlay (18 May 1829 – 26 March 1893) was general manager of the London and North Western Railway in nineteenth century England.

== Early life ==
Findlay was born at Rainhill in Lancashire on 18 May 1829, was the younger son of George Findlay (d. 1858) of Grantown, Inverness, by his wife Agnes (d. 1835), daughter of Henry Courtenay of Glasgow. His father, descended from a family of small tenant farmers residing at Coltfield in the parish of Alves in Elgin, became an inspector of masonry under the great engineer, George Stephenson, and was engaged in building the well-known skew bridge near Rainhill at the time of his son's birth. The younger George resided with his father successively at Liverpool, Coventry, and Halifax, where he attended the grammar school.

== Early career ==
At the age of fourteen he left school and worked as a mason on the Halifax branch railway, then in course of construction. Two years later he was assistant to his elder brother James on the Trent Valley Railway. The brothers were in the employ of Thomas Brassey, with whom George remained connected for seventeen years. Brassey early appreciated his abilities, and afterwards gave him opportunity to use them. On the completion of the Trent Valley line in 1847, Findlay proceeded to London, and entered the service of Messrs. Bransome & Gwyther, contractors, by whom he was employed in building the new engine sheds of the London and North Western Railway Company at Camden Town, and the 'Round House' at Chalk Farm.

He was afterwards engaged, under Messrs. Grissel & Peto, in building the new houses of parliament, and fashioned with his own hand much of the stone tracery of the great window at the east end of Westminster Hall. Within a year he left London and found employment till 1849 under Brassey's agent, Thomas Jones, in the construction of the Harecastle tunnel on the North Staffordshire Railway. On the completion of this work he undertook the contract for building the principal tunnel entrances, and was for a short time in charge of the construction of the bridges on the Churnet Valley branch of the North Staffordshire Railway between Froghall and Alton. Before the close of 1849 Brassey appointed him assistant engineer under his agent, Miles Day, in charge of the mining and brickwork of the Walton or Sutton tunnel on the Birkenhead, Lancashire, and Cheshire Railway.

In 1850, when Messrs. Brassey & Field commenced the construction of the first section of the Shrewsbury and Hereford Railway between Hereford and Ludlow, Findlay was appointed engineer and superintended the making of the line. On its completion in April 1852 Brassey, deciding to take a lease of it and work it himself, offered Findlay the post of manager, which he accepted after some hesitation. Brassey placed implicit confidence in him, seldom troubling himself about the details of the accounts, and only inquiring, 'George, have you got enough money in the bank to pay the rent?' In 1853, when the railway was extended from Ludlow to Hereford, it formed a connection with the Newport, Abergavenny, and Hereford Railway, which the London and North Western Company had undertaken to work. Brassey contracted to supply the locomotive power on this line, and Findlay thus first came into relations with the London and North Western Company.

== Later career ==
In 1862 the London and North Western and Great Western Companies took a joint lease of the Shrewsbury and Hereford line. Findlay assisted in conducting this transaction, which proved of benefit to both companies. The North Western appointed him their district manager for Shropshire and South Wales. With the concurrence of the North Western board he also accepted the post of manager of the Oswestry, Newtown, and Llanidloes Railways from Thomas Savin, who had leased those lines. His authority was subsequently extended over the Hereford, Hay, and Brecon Railway; the Brecon and Merthyr, the Old Rumney Railway, and the extension of the Oswestry and Newtown Railway to Aberystwyth and Towyn. His responsibility extended to all departments on these lines, Savin leaving everything to him, including the arrangements in connection with the opening up of new districts.

This arrangement with Savin lasted from January 1862 till December 1864, when Findlay realised that a change was inevitable. Savin had engaged in the promotion of the Cambrian system of railways, and Findlay perceived clearly that the system could not be commercially successful, at least for many years. He laid his views before (Sir) Richard Moon, chairman of the North Western Company, and procured his transfer at the end of 1864 to Euston station, where he was appointed general goods manager to the London and North Western Railway. In 1874 he was advanced to the post of general traffic manager, and in 1880, on the retirement of William Cawkwell, to that of general manager.

While at Euston he was largely concerned in the development of the through traffic between England and Ireland by the Dublin and Holyhead route. He was a familiar figure in parliamentary committee rooms and before royal commissions from 1854 onwards, and enjoyed the reputation of being an admirable witness. He was a strong opponent of the Manchester Ship Canal, appearing as an adverse witness on six occasions. In 1888 several of his suggestions were adopted by government as modifications of the policy in regard to Irish railways, recommended by the royal commission on Irish public works. At the prolonged inquiry before the board of trade in 1889 as to the revised schedules of maximum rates and charges preferred by the companies under the railway and canal traffic bill of 1888, he was under examination for eight days, and was highly complimented by the chairman, Lord Balfour of Burleigh, on the quality of his evidence. In 1891 he declined joining the royal commission to inquire into the relations between capital and labour, but appeared before it as the chief witness on behalf of the railway companies. On the retirement of Sir Richard Moon in the same year, Findlay was offered the post of chairman of the London and North Western Company, but preferred to retain his more arduous position.

In his later days he was the most prominent figure among railway men in England. He had an admirable talent for organisation and direction, and was capable of intense labour. His jocular remark to a committee of the House of Commons that he could manage all the railways in Ireland, and find time for two days' fishing a week, was based on no exaggerated estimate of his own capacity. Findlay was well known as a lecturer on railway matters, and he developed a lecture on the 'Working of an English Railway,' delivered at the Chatham School of Military Engineering, into a volume on 'The Working and Management of an English Railway' (London, 1889, 8vo), a valuable practical treatise, which had reached a fifth edition in 1894, under the editorship of S. M. Philip, and is widely studied both in England and abroad.

Findlay was elected an associate of the Institution of Civil Engineers on 1 December 1874. He was a lieutenant-colonel of the engineer and railway volunteer staff corps, justice of the peace for Middlesex, and from 1889 an alderman of the county council. At the Paris Exhibition in 1889 he acted as vice-president of a committee formed for the purpose of exhibiting a collection of appliances, past and present, used in the conveyance of passengers and merchandise, and was created a chevalier of the legion of honour. He was knighted on 21 May 1892. Findlay died on 26 March 1893 at his residence, Hill House, Edgware, Middlesex, and was buried at Whitchurch on 30 March.

== Family ==
He was twice married. By his first wife, Annie, daughter of Swanston Adamson of Rugeley in Staffordshire, he had a large family, of whom four sons and two daughters survived him; she died in 1883. In 1885 he married Charlotte, daughter of Pryse Jacob of Bridgend, Glamorganshire.

== Works ==
- The Working and Management of an English Railway (2nd edition, 1889)

Business positions
Preceded by William Cawkwell	General Manager of the London and North Western Railway; 1874–1893	Succeeded by Frederick Harrison
