= Gilbert Claughton =

English businessman and politician

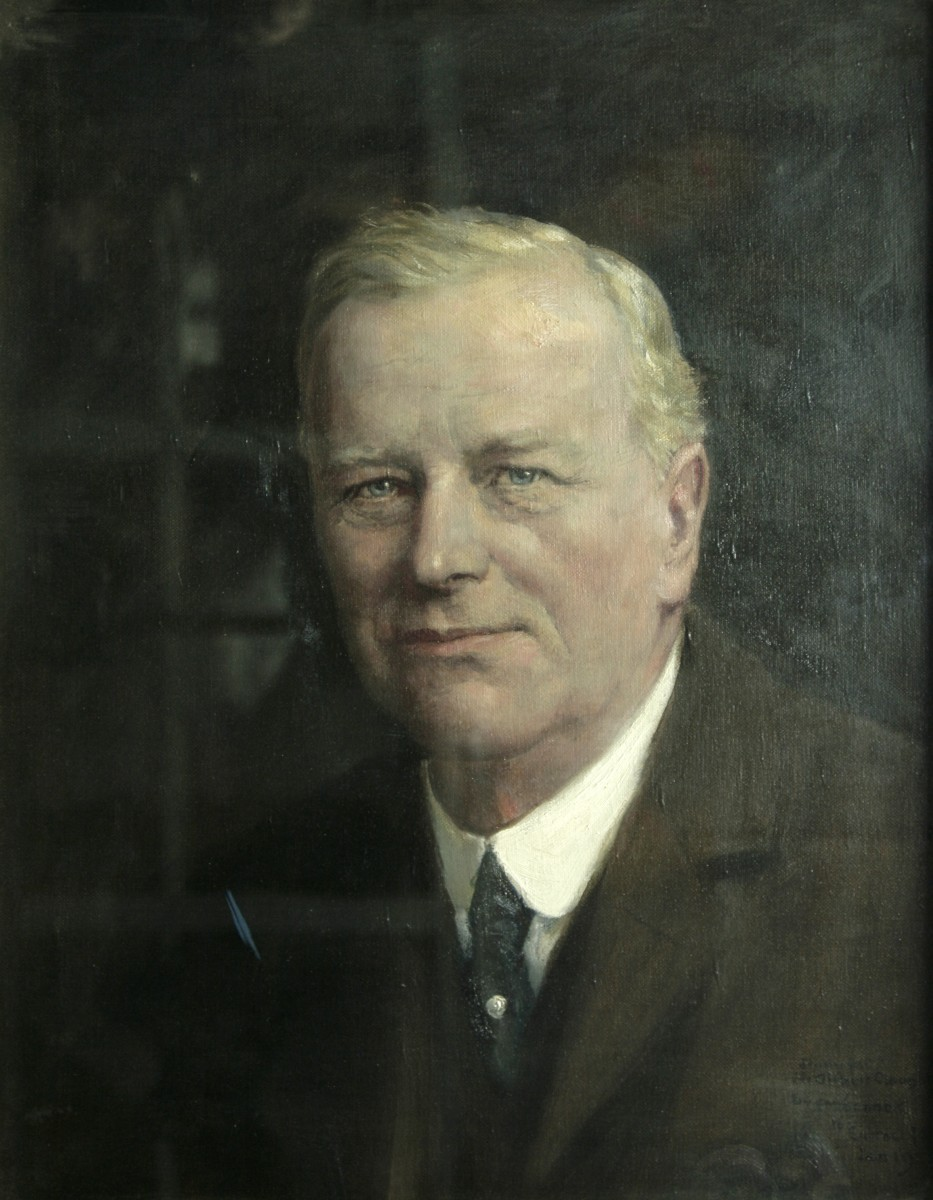
Portrait by Frank Moss Bennett, c. 1922

Escutcheon of the Claughton baronets of The Priory

Sir Gilbert Henry Claughton, 1st Baronet (21 February 1856 – 27 June 1921), was an English businessman and politician.

Born in Kidderminster, Worcestershire, England Claughton was the son of the Right Reverend Thomas Legh Claughton, Bishop of St Albans, by the Honourable Julia Susannah Ward, daughter of William Ward, 10th Baron Ward. He was Mayor of Dudley between 1891 and 1894 and one of the original members of the Staffordshire County Council. He was an Alderman of the council between 1895 and 1921. In 1906 he stood unsuccessfully as a Conservative for Dudley. From 1911 to 1921 he served as Chairman of the London and North Western Railway. He was created a baronet, of The Priory in the Parish of Dudley in the County of Worcester, on 4 July 1912. He died in June 1921, aged 65, when the title became extinct.

Baronetage of the United Kingdom
New creation	Baronet (of The Priory); 1912–1921	Extinct
Preceded by Beale baronets	Claughton baronets of The Priory; 4 July 1912	Succeeded by Godlee baronets
