= William E. Dorrington =

British businessman

William E Dorrington (1852–1926) was chairman and Treasurer of the Manchester Royal Exchange Limited, a director of the London and North Western Railway Company (succeeded by the LMS), a Merchant and Shipper and formerly a major of the 3rd battalion Cheshire Regiment of Volunteers.
