= Ernest Crosbie Trench =

Ernest Frederic Crosbie Trench CBE, TD (6 August 1869 – 15 September 1960) was a British civil engineer.

Ernest was born on 6 August 1869 to George Frederic Trench and Frances Charlotte Talbot Crosbie. Anne of York, Duchess of Exeter, sister to Edward IV and Richard III was an ancestor of Ernest's mother. He was educated at Monkton Combe School and at Lausanne before studying for a Master of Arts degree from Trinity College, Dublin.

He worked primarily as a railway engineer, beginning his railway career as a pupil of E.B. Thornhill on the London and North Western Railway (LNWR) in 1893, after which he worked for the Midland Railway (from 1899) and the North London Railway from January 1903, before returning to the LNWR on 1 March 1906 as assistant engineer. Three years later on 1 March 1909, he was promoted to chief assistant engineer, becoming chief engineer on 1 October the same year following the retirement of Thornhill the previous month. At the start of 1923 he was appointed as the chief engineer of the London, Midland and Scottish Railway (LMS), becoming the LMS consulting engineer from 1 February 1927, retiring on 1 April 1930.

He became involved in the Institution of Civil Engineers as an associate member in 1897, progressing to a full membership in 1904, he was first elected to the council in 1915 and would serve on it for the next seventeen years. He was elected vice president of the institution in 1924 and served as its president from 1927 to 1928.

In 1920 he was appointed a Commander of the Order of the British Empire for "services rendered in connexion with 1914-18 war" and in 1931 received the Territorial Decoration for service as a volunteer Colonel in the Engineer and Railway Staff Corps.

He married Netta Taylor on 3 April 1895 and fathered five sons and one daughter. He died in Marlborough, Wiltshire on 15 September 1960.

== See also ==
Professional and academic associations
Preceded by Frederick Palmer	President of the Institution of Civil Engineers; November 1927 – November 1928	Succeeded by Brodie Henderson
