= Frank Ree =

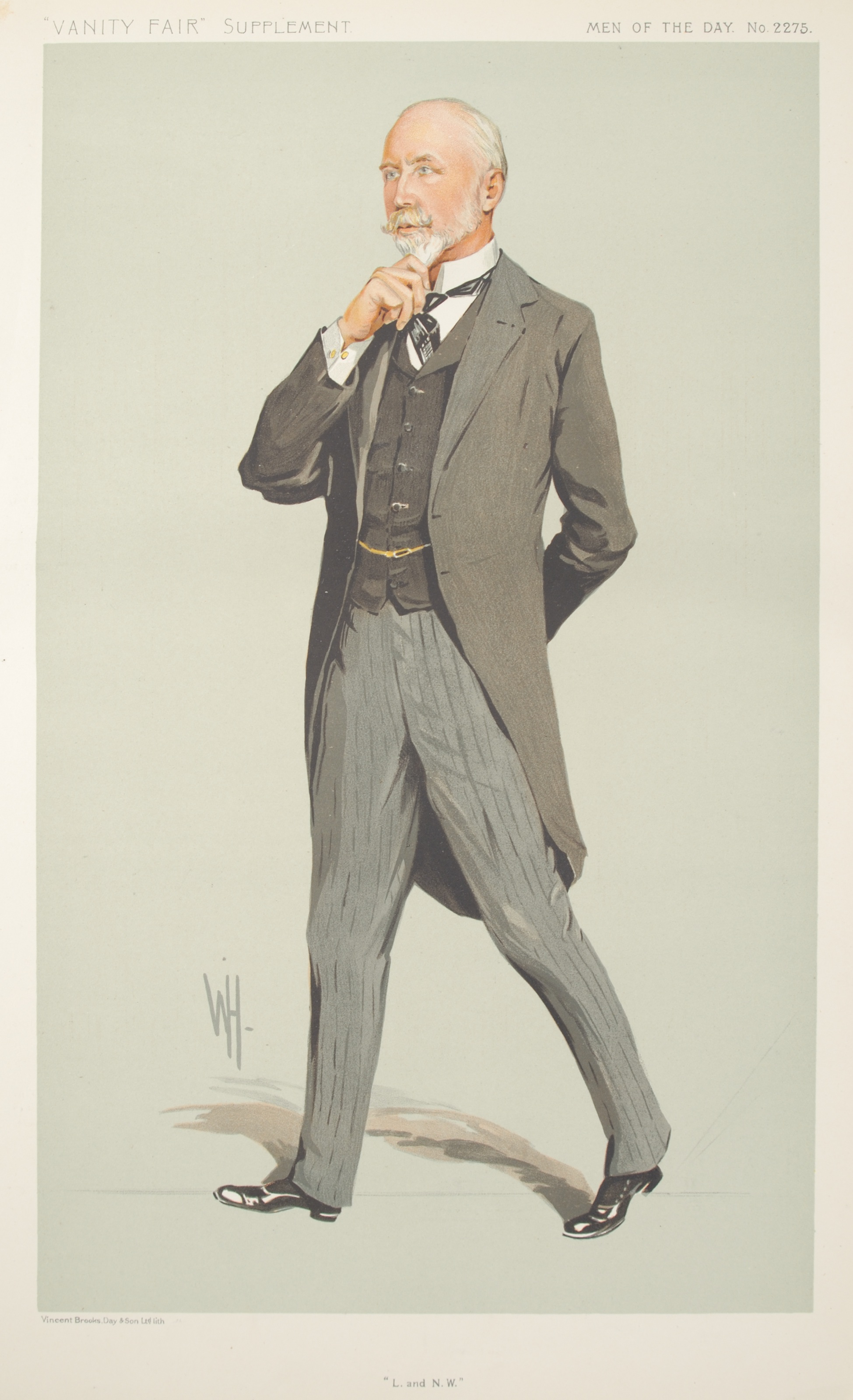
Caricature of Frank Ree by Wallace Hester, published in Vanity Fair, 5 June 1912.

Sir Frank Ree (31 October 1851 – 17 February 1914) was a British railway manager, General Manager of the London and North Western Railway and the North London Railway from 1909. Born in Walham Green, he was the son of Dr. Henry Pawle Ree. He was made a knight bachelor in 1913.

Business positions
Preceded by Sir Frederick Harrison	General Manager of the London and North Western Railway; 1909–1914	Succeeded by Robert Turnbull
