= Frederick Harrison (railway manager) =

Sir Frederick Harrison
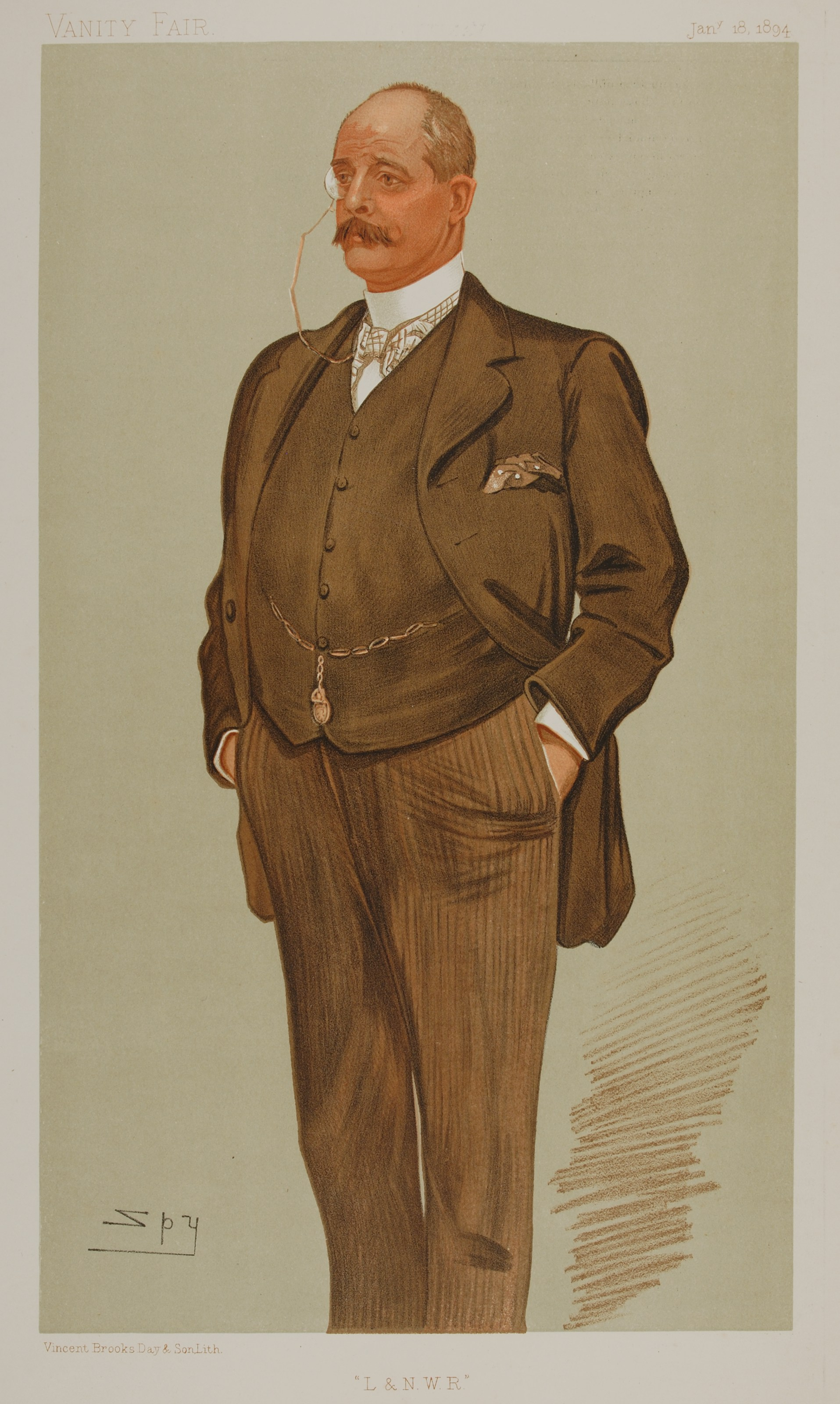
- Harrison caricatured by Spy for Vanity Fair, 1894

General Manager of the London and North Western Railway
- In office 1893–1908
- Preceded by: Sir George Findlay
- Succeeded by: Frank Ree

Personal details
- Born: 1844
- Died: 1941 (aged 96–97)

Military service
- Allegiance: United Kingdom
- Branch/service: British Army
- Commands: Engineer and Railway Staff Corps

Lieutenant Colonel Sir Frederick Harrison (1844 – 31 December 1914) was railway manager and an officer in the British Army's Engineer and Railway Volunteer Staff Corps.

Harrison was born in Croydon, Surrey, the son of George Harrison of Newport, Monmouthshire.

At the age of twenty, Harrison became a clerk on the London and North Western Railway (LNWR) at Shrewsbury. He rose through the ranks, working at Euston under George Findlay, the General Goods Manager; a later post was that of Assistant District Superintendent at Liverpool, and in 1874 he moved to the equivalent job at Chester. He remained there for a year before, aged 31, becoming Assistant Superintendent of the Line. Ten years after this he was appointed Chief Goods Manager of the LNWR. His next promotion was in 1893, when he became General Manager of the LNWR, a post he held until the end of 1908. The following year he joined the Board of the South Eastern Railway, very soon becoming Deputy Chairman, and also being appointed to the South Eastern & Chatham Railway Companies Joint Management Committee; he served these bodies until his death.

He was made a knight bachelor in December 1902.

He married firstly, Fanny Louisa Thomas (1848–1883), and secondly, in 1888, Jessie Margaret Goldie, daughter of Charles Dashwood Goldie.

== Sources ==
- "HARRISON, Lt-Col Sir Frederick", Who Was Who, A & C Black, 1920–2008; online edn, Oxford University Press, December 2007(subscription required)

Business positions
Preceded by Sir George Findlay	General Manager of the London and North Western Railway; 1893–1908	Succeeded by Frank Ree
