= LMS 6399 Fury =

British experimental express passenger locomotive

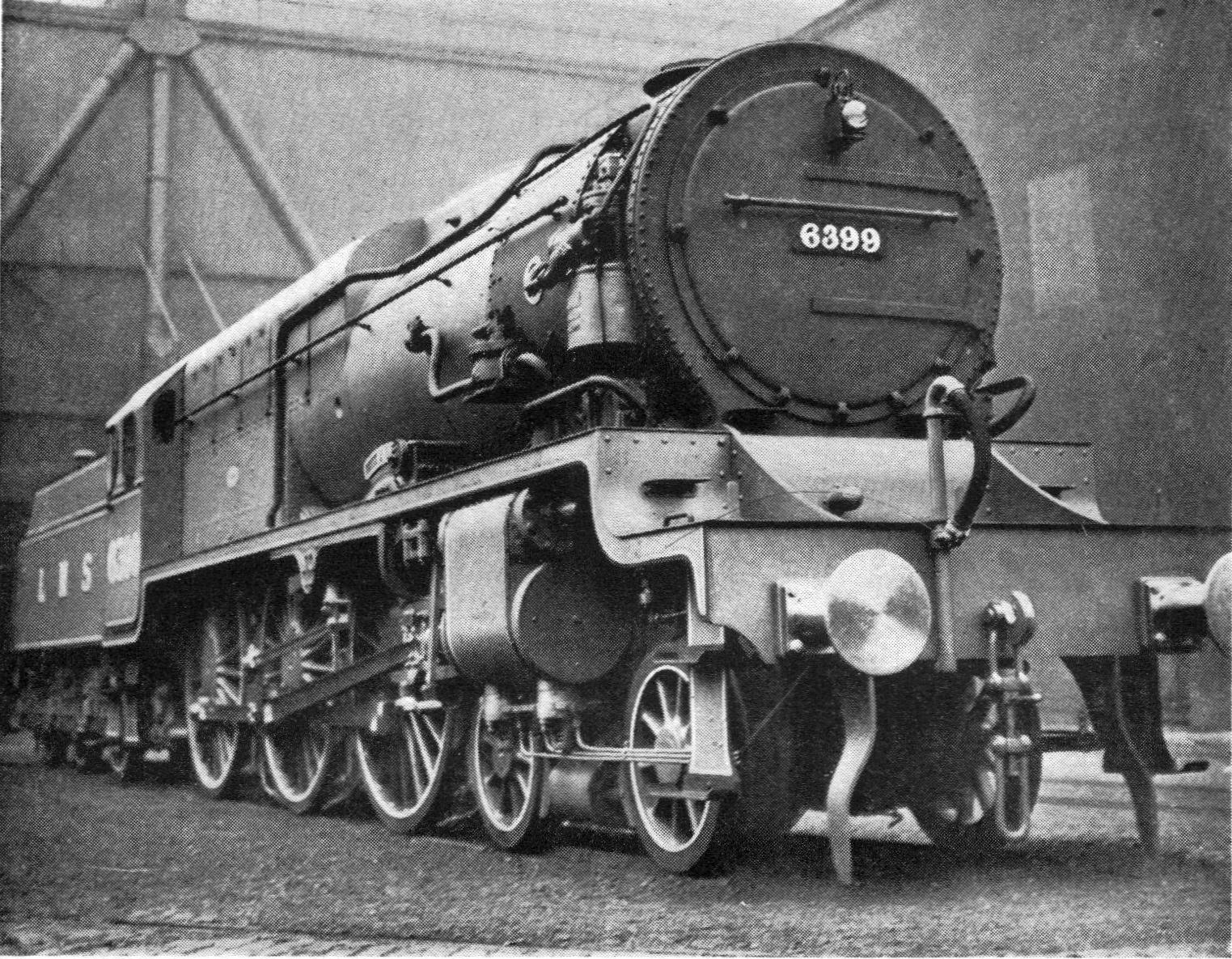
Type and origin
- Power type: Steam
- Builder: North British Locomotive Co.
- Serial number: 23890
- Build date: 1929
Specifications
- Configuration
  - Whyte: 4-6-0
  - UIC: 2′C h3
- Gauge: 4 ft 8 1/2 in (1,435 mm) standard gauge
- Leading dia.: 3 ft 3 1/2 in (1.003 m)
- Driver dia.: 6 ft 9 in (2.057 m)
- Length: 64 ft 2 3/4 in (19.58 m)
- Loco weight: 87.10 long tons (88.50 t; 97.55 short tons)
- Fuel type: Coal
- Fuel capacity: 5.5 long tons (5.6 t; 6.2 short tons)
- Water cap.: 3,500 imp gal (16,000 L)
- Firebox
  - Grate area: 28 sq ft (2.6 m^{2})
- Boiler pressure: 1,400–1,800 psi (9.65–12.41 MPa) (HP boiler), 900 psi (6.21 MPa) (HP drum), 250 psi (1.72 MPa) (LP boiler)
- Heating surface
  - Firebox: 218 sq ft (20.3 m^{2})
  - Tubes: 1,335 sq ft (124.0 m^{2})
- Superheater
  - Heating area: 274 sq ft (25.5 m^{2}) (high pressure); 355 sq ft (33.0 m^{2}) (low pressure)
- Cylinders: Three: 1 HP inside, 2 LP outside
- High-pressure cylinder: 11 1/2 in × 26 in (292 mm × 660 mm)
- Low-pressure cylinder: 18 in × 26 in (457 mm × 660 mm)
Career
- Operators: London, Midland and Scottish Railway
- Numbers: 6399
- Official name: Fury
- Disposition: Rebuilt in 1935 as Rebuilt Royal Scot class no. 6170 British Legion

The London, Midland and Scottish Railway (LMS) No. 6399 Fury was an unsuccessful British experimental express passenger locomotive. The intention was to save fuel by using high-pressure steam, which is thermodynamically more efficient than low-pressure steam.

== Overview ==
Built in Glasgow in 1929 by the North British Locomotive Company (NBL), it was one of a number of steam locomotives built around the world in the search for "Superpower steam". The locomotive was a joint venture between the LMS, with Henry Fowler as chief mechanical engineer (C.M.E.), and The Superheater Company, with the latter having responsibility for constructing the complex, three-stage Schmidt-based boiler. The LMS provided a Royal Scot frame and running gear. However, Carney shows that the frames for Fury were not standard Royal Scot frames, but longer. For the complex boiler, John Brown & Company of Sheffield forged the special nickel-steel alloy high pressure drum and many boiler fittings were imported from Germany but otherwise all manufacture was carried out by NBL.

A 3-cylindered semi-compound locomotive, it had one high-pressure cylinder between the frames (11.5 inch bore) and two larger low-pressure outside cylinders (18 inch bore). The Schmidt steam-raising boiler was a 3-stage unit. The primary generator was a fully sealed ultra-high-pressure circuit working between 1,400–1,800 psi (9.65–12.41 MPa), filled with distilled water that transferred heat from the firebox to the high-pressure drum. This raised high-pressure steam at 900 psi (6.21 MPa) which was taken to power the cylinders and also recirculate pure water. The third steam raising unit was a relatively conventional locomotive fire tube boiler operating at 250 psi (1.72 MPa) heated by combustion gases from the coal fire. The engine was technically an "ultra-high pressure, semi-compound steam locomotive". It was given the LMS number 6399 and then inherited the name Fury from LMS 6138, which had itself been renamed in October 1929.

After short runs during January 1930, a longer test run from Glasgow to Carstairs was scheduled for 10 February 1930. Approaching Carstairs station at slow speed, one of the ultra-high-pressure tubes burst and the escaping steam ejected the coal fire through the fire-hole door, killing Lewis Schofield of the Superheater Company. Subsequently, the burst tube was thoroughly investigated at Sheffield University but no definitive conclusion reached. The boiler was eventually repaired and Fury moved to Derby where a number of running trials were carried out until early 1934, mostly revealing significant shortcomings in performance. Fury's rods and linkages were then removed together with the indicator shelter and test gear when in 1935 it was rebuilt by William Stanier at Crewe Works with a more conventional type 2 boiler becoming 6170 British Legion, the first of the LMS 2 and 2A boilered 4-6-0 locomotives.

Despite the accident, Fury was primarily an economic rather than a technological failure. Although tolerating the trials from Derby, Stanier didn't devote much effort to rectifying the faults Fury displayed, no doubt because of his many other work pressures and development of the LMS Turbomotive. Nevertheless, Fury never earned revenue for the LMS and in fact "Fury must have travelled more miles under tow than under its own steam". As many other experimental locomotives showed, the theoretical benefits of ultra high steam pressure locomotives were hard to realise in practice. Fuel is only one part of the operating costs of a steam locomotive—maintenance is very significant, and introducing extra complications always increased this disproportionally.

In France, the Chemins de fer de Paris à Lyon et à la Méditerranée had bought a Schmidt system 4-8-2 locomotive (no. 241.B.1), and in 1933 this too burst an ultra high pressure tube. The failure was investigated, and it was concluded from both incidents that inadequate water circulation in the ultra high pressure circuit was responsible.
