= Royal Scot =

Royal Scot may refer to:

- Garde Écossaise, a regiment of the French army
- Royal Scots, a regiment of the British Army
- Royal Scots (Jacobite), a regiment of Scottish exiles in French service, in existence from 1744 to 1762
- Royal Scot (train), a British named express passenger train which first ran in 1862
- LMS Royal Scot Class, a class of express passenger locomotive introduced in 1927
- LMS Royal Scot Class 6100 Royal Scot, a preserved British steam locomotive of the above class
- a Solenostemon scutellarioides cultivar
