= Irish Mail =

Former Euston-Holyhead rail service

Overview
- Service type: Mail & passenger train
- First service: 1 August 1848
- Last service: 1 June 2002
- Former operator(s): Virgin Trains; InterCity; British Rail; London, Midland & Scottish Railway; London & North Western Railway

Route
- Termini: London Euston; Holyhead
- Distance travelled: 264 miles
- Line(s) used: West Coast; North Wales Coast

Technical
- Rolling stock: Multiple, including InterCity 125, Royal Scot, British Railways Mark 1
- Operating speed: Up to 125 mph

The Irish Mail was a named train in the United Kingdom that operated from London Euston via the West Coast and North Wales Coast lines to Holyhead from 1848 until 2002, connecting with ferry services to Dublin.

== History ==
The first Irish Mail was operated by the London & North Western Railway on 1 August 1848. It was subsequently operated by the London, Midland & Scottish Railway, British Rail, InterCity and Virgin Trains. As the Britannia Bridge had yet to be completed, the first services terminated at Bangor and recommenced at Llanfairpwllgwyngyll. It operated twice daily in each direction, although this was reduced to daily during World War II.

Although notionally an express service, with the electrification of the West Coast Main Line, from the 1960s, the service stopped for a locomotive change at Crewe.

Although the service continued to operate, the name was dropped in June 2002 as part of a policy by Virgin Trains not to operate named trains.

== Incidents ==
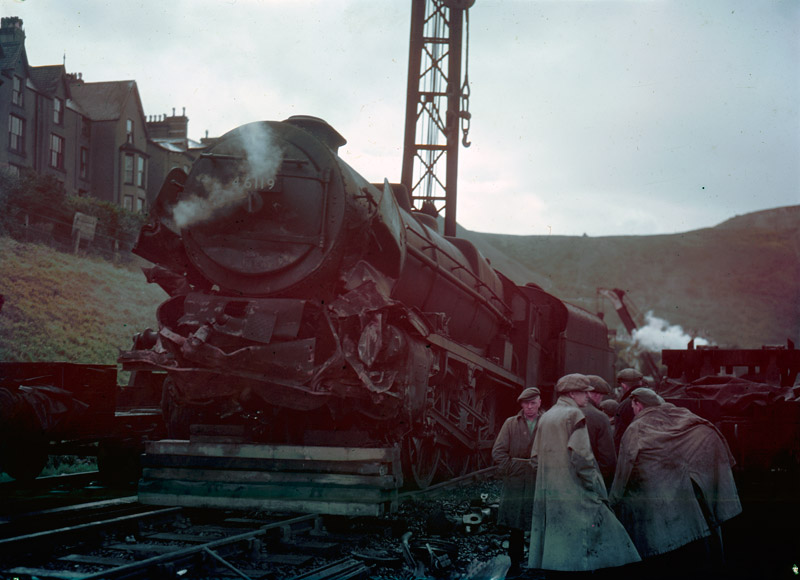
The aftermath of the Penmaenmawr railway accident in 1950 - LMS Rebuilt Royal Scot Class No. 46119 Lancashire Fusilier with accident damage

- On 20 August 1868, the Irish Mail collided with some run away goods wagons loaded with flammable products near Abergele, resulting in 33 fatalities.
- On 14 September 1870, the Irish Mail was accidentally diverted into a siding at Tamworth and crashed into the River Anker with 3 fatalities.
- On 27 August 1950, the Irish Mail collided with shunting locomotive LMS Hughes Crab No. 42885 near Penmaenmawr station, resulting in 6 fatalities.

== Namesake ==
In 1998, Virgin Trains named Class 43 powercar 43101 The Irish Mail 1848 - 1998 to commemorate the services' 150th anniversary.

== See also ==
- Chester and Holyhead Railway
