= LMS Royal Scot Class 6170 British Legion =

British steam locomotive

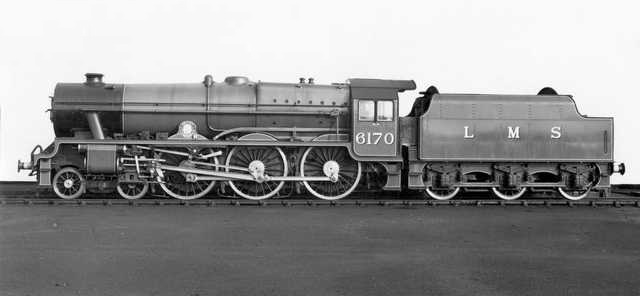
6170 British Legion as built in 1935, official photograph.

The London, Midland and Scottish Railway (LMS) 6170 (later 46170) British Legion was a British steam locomotive. It was the prototype for, and is sometimes considered a member of, the Rebuilt Royal Scot Class but differed from those later rebuilds principally in having a unique type 2 boiler, rather than a type 2A boiler, the two not being interchangeable.

== Overview ==
6170 was constructed in 1935 utilising the frames of the unsuccessful experimental high pressure compound locomotive 6399 Fury. The Schmidt-Henschel boiler was replaced with a taper boiler, designed by William Stanier, and a new smokebox and inside cylinder were fitted.

The locomotive was named after the British Legion and given a number as part of the Royal Scot Class. The boiler type was type 2.

It remained the only Class 6P rebuild until 1942 when two Jubilee Class engines 5735 Comet and 5736 Phoenix were also rebuilt with 2A boilers. After that, the LMS rebuilt all 70 of the Royal Scots, between 1943 and 1955 and 18 of the Patriot Class between 1946 and 1949 with 2A boilers. Thus 6170 was a prototype of a family of LMS 2A boilered 4-6-0s. When built, 6170 was given the standard passenger livery of LMS crimson lake and was the only rebuilt Royal Scot to wear that livery whilst in service, although 6100 Royal Scot carries it into preservation.

There were numerous differences between 6170 and the other rebuilt Royal Scots 6170's boiler was longer and it had a new cab with side windows, whereas the other rebuilt Royal Scots retained their old cut-out cabs (the rebuilt Jubilees retained their original side window cabs and the rebuilt Patriots gained new side window cabs). It was the only rebuilt Royal Scot built with a single chimney. Changes during its lifetime saw the fitting of a double chimney and smoke deflectors.

After nationalisation in 1948, 6170 was renumbered 46170. It was withdrawn from service in 1962 and subsequently scrapped.

== Sources ==
- Cox, E.S. (1970). Royal Scots of the LMS. Shepperton: Ian Allan. ISBN 0711001650.
