= LMS 2 and 2A boilered 4-6-0 locomotives =

The London, Midland and Scottish Railway (LMS) 2 and 2A boilered 4-6-0 locomotives were express passenger 4-6-0 steam locomotives. In 1935, William Stanier, Chief Mechanical Engineer of the LMS, ordered the rebuilding of the unique experimental high pressure compound locomotive 6399 Fury. The Schmidt-Henschel boiler was replaced with a tapered boiler, with a drumhead smokebox, designated type 2. The type 2 boiler had a tube surface of 1,669 square feet, formed by tubes 2 1/8 inches (54 mm) in diameter and 14 ft 3 in (4.34 m) long. It was fitted with a 28-row superheater with 360 square feet (33 m^{2}) of heating surface. The superheater elements, 1 1/8 inches (29 mm) in diameter, were fitted into flue tubes 5 1/8 inches (130 mm) diameter.

On testing the boiler performed poorly, with heat transfer to the water being inadequate because the hot gases from the firebox passed too rapidly through the tubes to the smokebox. The rapid passage of gas was indicated by too high a temperature in the smokebox, and the choking of the smokebox by excessive char carried through from the firebox. The boiler was re-tubed with 180 smaller tubes 1 7/8 in (48 mm) diameter, and with superheater elements 1 1/4 in (32 mm) diameter. The single blastpipe was replaced with a double blastpipe and chimney to provide adequate gas velocity in the smokebox. This, combined with the increased rate of evaporation provided by the re-tubing, improved the performance of the boiler substantially.

The performance of Stanier's Jubilee Class also suffered from incorrect boiler proportions. In 1935, a design for an improved taper boiler was schemed out; this was 13 ft (4.0 m) long, with 198 tubes 1 3/4 inches (44 mm) in diameter. In 1943 Stanier instructed Coleman, the chief designer at Derby, to rebuild two of the Jubilee class with boilers to this design. This type of boiler was designated type 2A. Combined with modifications to the steam ports and valve gear, the rebuilding produced locomotives that were more powerful and economical than either the original Jubilees or the Royal Scots.

As the boilers of the Royal Scots were due for replacement, and their built-up smokeboxes were proving difficult to keep airtight, the decision was taken to rebuild the class in batches. They were also fitted with type 2A boilers. Rebuilding started in 1943, and eventually all 70 members of the class were rebuilt.

From 1946, 18 of the 52 Patriot Class locomotives (which shared the same chassis as the Royal Scots) also received 2A boilers.

== List of locomotives ==
A total of 91 locomotives were rebuilt. Dates of building and numbers of engines are given in the following table.

LMS Nos	BR Nos	Class	Rebuild source	Rebuild dates	Rebuilt by LMS	Rebuilt by BR	Total
6170	46170	British Legion	6399 Fury	1935	1	0	1
5735/6	45735/6	Rebuilt Jubilee	Jubilee Class	1942	2	0	2
6101/2/5-7/10/13/23-30/4/6/7/40-3/8/51/3/5/6/8/62-5/7	46100-69	Rebuilt Royal Scot	Royal Scot	1943-1955	43	27	70
5514/21/6/8-31/40	45512/14/21-3/25-32/4-6/45	Rebuilt Patriot	Patriot	1946-1949	8	10	18
Total				1935, 1942–1955	54	37	91

== Withdrawal ==
All 91 locomotives were withdrawn from stock between 1961 and 1965.

Year	British Legion	Rebuilt Jubilees	Rebuilt Royal Scots	Rebuilt Patriots	Total
1961	0	0	0	2	2
1962	1	0	29	0	30
1963	0	0	15	5	20
1964	0	2	21	8	31
1965	0	0	5	3	8
Total	1	2	70	18	91

== Sources ==
- Cox, E.S. (1970). Royal Scots of the LMS. Shepperton: Ian Allan. ISBN 0711001650.
- Pat Rowledge Stanier 4-6-0s of the LMS
