= LMS Rebuilt Jubilee Class =

Class of 2 British 3-cylinder 4-6-0 locomotives

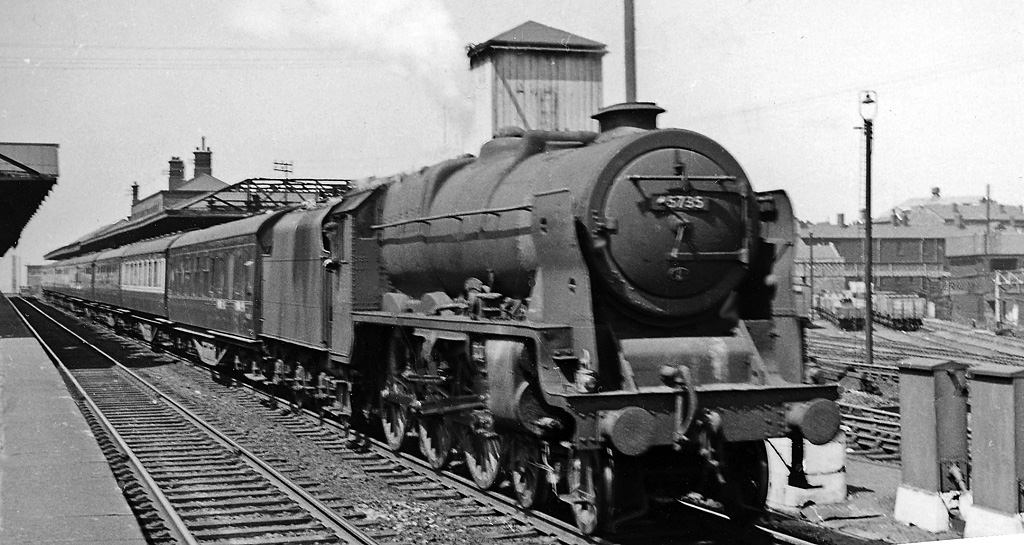
- 45735 Comet at Wigan (North Western) in June 1957
Type and origin
- Power type: Steam
- Rebuild date: 1942
- Number rebuilt: 2
Specifications
- Configuration
  - Whyte: 4-6-0
  - UIC: 2′C h2
- Gauge: 4 ft 8 1/2 in (1,435 mm)
- Leading dia.: 3 ft 3 1/2 in (1.003 m)
- Driver dia.: 6 ft 9 in (2.057 m)
- Length: 64 ft 8 3/4 in (19.73 m)
- Loco weight: 82.00 long tons (83.32 t)
- Tender weight: 54.65 long tons (55.53 t)
- Fuel type: Coal
- Fuel capacity: 9.0 long tons (9.1 t)
- Water cap.: 4,000 imp gal (18,000 L; 4,800 US gal)
- Firebox
  - Grate area: 31 1/4 sq ft (2.90 m^{2})
- Boiler: LMS type 2A
- Boiler pressure: 250 lbf/in^{2} (1.7 MPa)
- Heating surface
  - Firebox: 195 sq ft (18.1 m^{2})
  - Tubes and flues: 1,667 sq ft (154.9 m^{2})
- Superheater
  - Heating area: 348 to 367 sq ft (32.3 to 34.1 m^{2})
- Cylinders: Three
- Cylinder size: 17 in × 26 in (432 mm × 660 mm)
- Valve gear: Walschaerts
- Valve type: Piston valves
Performance figures
- Tractive effort: 2A: 29,570 lbf (131.5 kN)
Career
- Power class: 6P, later 7P
- Numbers: LMS: 5735–5736; BR: 45735–45736
- Axle load class: BR: Route Availability 9
- Withdrawn: 1964
- Disposition: Both scrapped

The London, Midland and Scottish Railway (LMS) Rebuilt Jubilee Class consisted of two 4-6-0 steam locomotives.

== History ==
Both were rebuilt in 1942 from the LMS Jubilee Class engines—5736 Phoenix in April 1942 and 5735 Comet a month later. They were the second and third examples of the 2A-boilered locomotives, following on from the 1935 pioneer rebuild 6170 British Legion. Both Jubilees had been built in 1936 at Crewe Works, and therefore their original type 3A boilers were not life expired and hence were refurbished and reused on different engines rather than being scrapped. They were given the power classification 6P.

These two one-offs were have said to be a direct upgrade in performance in both power and steaming abilities from the non-rebuilt Jubilees, and similar in performance to the Rebuilt Patriot Class, however they were 3 tons heavier than the non-rebuilds, thus limiting their route availability.

From 1943, it was decided not to repeat the conversion on the remaining 189 members of the Jubilee Class. Rather it was decided to rebuild members of the LMS Royal Scot Class and LMS Patriot Class into the LMS Rebuilt Royal Scot Class and the LMS Rebuilt Patriot Class.

== British Railways service ==
Both were inherited by British Railways in 1948, and had 40000 added to their numbers so that they became 45735/6. 45736 Phoenix was withdrawn in September 1964 and 45735 Comet followed in October. Neither was preserved.
