= Tamworth rail crash =

1870 railway incident in England

Coordinates: 52.6375°N 1.6861°W

Details
- Date: 14 September 1870; 4:09 am
- Location: Tamworth (low level) railway station
- Country: England
- Line: Trent Valley Line
- Operator: London and North Western Railway
- Cause: Signalling error

Statistics
- Trains: 1
- Deaths: 3
- Injured: 13

The Tamworth rail crash was an accident that happened at Tamworth railway station in Staffordshire, England, on 14 September 1870. It was caused when a signalman's error accidentally diverted the Irish Mail express onto a dead end siding, where part of the train crashed through the buffers and into the River Anker. Three people were killed, and thirteen injured.

== Setting ==
At Tamworth low level station in 1870, there were two running lines through the station, with two platform loops diverging at each side, serving each platform. At the end of the up (London bound) platform loop was a dead-end siding leading to a pumphouse by the River Anker with a small reservoir alongside it.

The points exiting the up platform loop onto the running line were interlocked with those into the siding, meaning that when the points were set to allow trains through on the running line, the points would also be automatically set to divert any trains running forward on the loop into the siding, to prevent them from accidentally running onto the running line. There were two signalboxes at the north and south ends of the station, each controlling the points and signals from either direction.

== The accident ==
On 14 September, the Irish Mail had been delayed by the late running of the steamer at Holyhead, and it was thirteen minutes late by the time it approached Tamworth. The signalman in the south signalbox was expecting the Mail, and had correctly set his points to allow it through on the running line, which also set the points on the loop into the siding. The signalman in the north signalbox however became confused after his watch had stopped, and was expecting a goods train, and set his points into the loop.

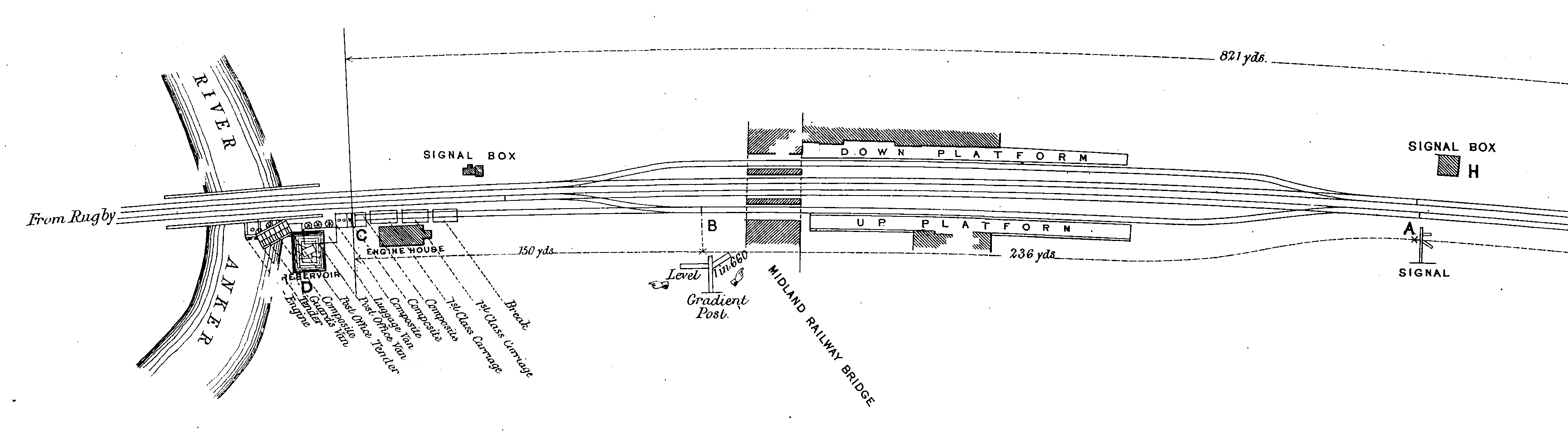
Extract from diagram in the official accident report. North is at the bottom of the diagram.

At around 4:09 am the Mail approached Tamworth at around 50 mph (85 kmh), the driver saw that the signal was set for the loop and applied the emergency brakes, but could not stop before being diverted onto the platform loop and then into the siding. The train had slowed to about 15 mph when it hit the buffer stop at the end of the siding. The locomotive went through the buffers and crashed into the River Anker. A coach and a postal van overturned into an adjacent small reservoir. The driver, Samuel Taylor, and fireman, William Davis, on the engine, and one passenger, Rev. Father Healy, were killed. Thirteen other people were injured, including ten passengers, two postal staff, and a guard who was seriously injured.

== Report ==
The accident report, completed by Henry Tyler, criticised the poor interlocking and signalling arrangements at the station, specifically the lack of interlocking between the north and south signalboxes to prevent an accident of this type from occurring. It also criticised the lack of sufficient warning to the engine driver that the points were set the wrong way, and also the lack of information about train movements; telegraph equipment had been installed at both signalboxes at the time of the accident, but was not in use.

The report also noted that the accident would have been considerably worse had the Mail not been fitted with continuous brakes, and noted that it might have stopped short of the buffers had the rails not been greasy.

John R. Raynes wrote in 1921 that "it transpired that the poor signalman had been on duty 68 hours consecutively!". This is not supported by the figures given in Tyler's official report.
