= Penmaenmawr railway station =

Railway station in Penmaenmawr, Conwy, Wales

Penmaenmawr
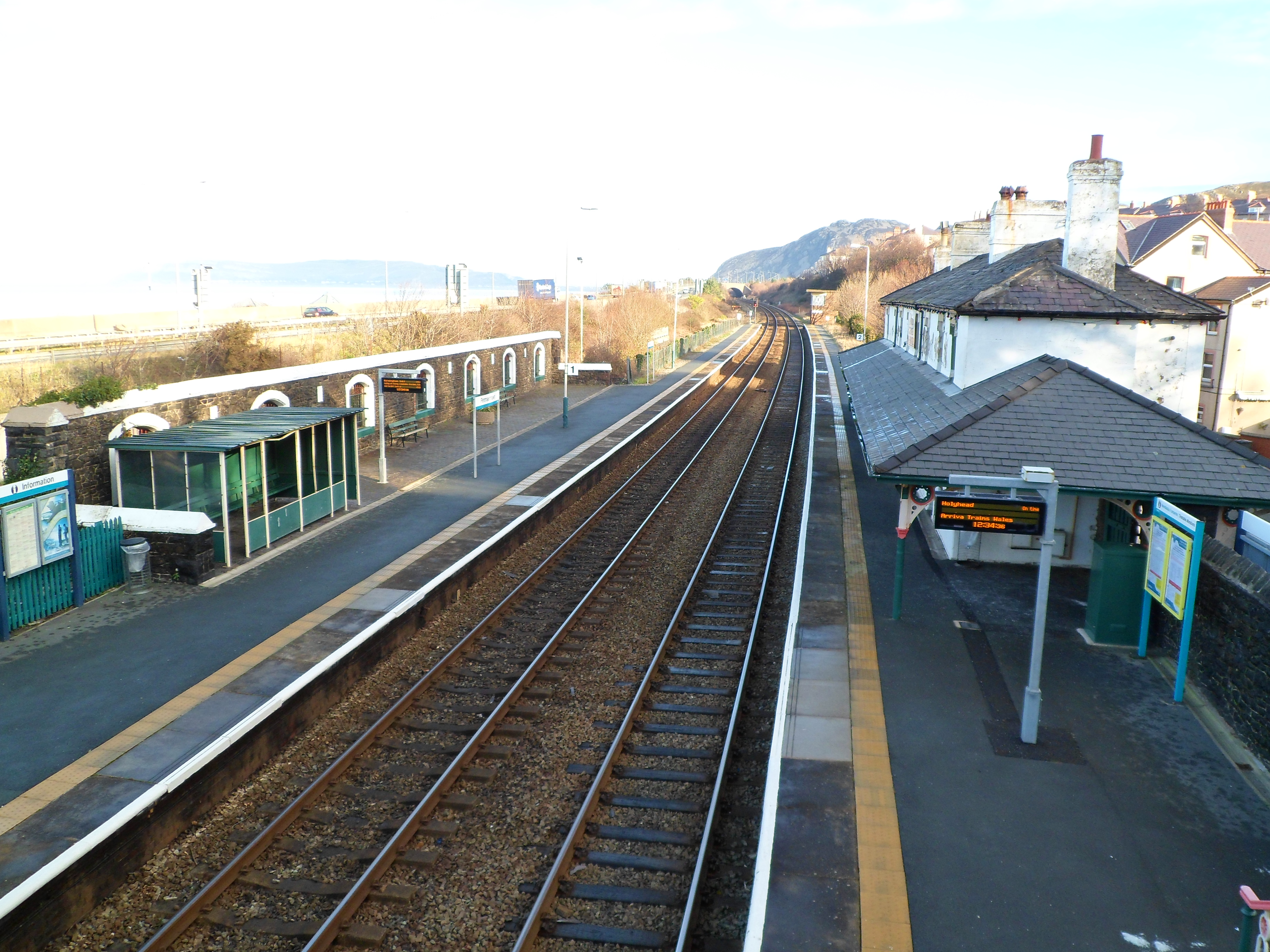
- Penmaenmawr station in January 2012

General information
- Location: Penmaenmawr, Conwy; Wales
- Coordinates: 53.270°N 3.924°W
- Grid reference: SH718765
- Manager: Transport for Wales Rail
- Platforms: 2

Other information
- Station code: PMW
- Classification: DfT category F1

History
- Opened: 1849

Passengers
- 2021/22: ▲11,196
- 2022/23: ▲14,832
- 2023/24: ▲17,068
- 2024/25: ▲19,668
- 2025/26: ▲24,464

Listed Building – Grade II
- Feature: Penmaenmawr Railway Station
- Designated: 3 November 1995
- Reference no.: 16520
Location
Notes
- Passenger statistics from the Office of Rail and Road

Penmaenmawr railway station serves the town of Penmaenmawr in the Conwy County Borough of Wales. It is located on the North Wales Coast Line between Llandudno Junction and Holyhead.

== History ==
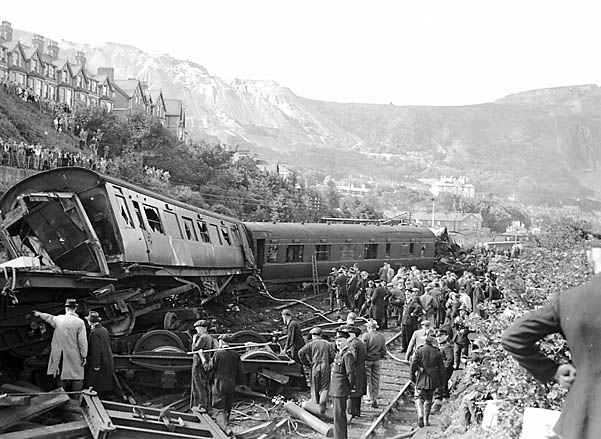
Aftermath of the Penmaenmawr train crash, 1950

The local granite quarries are a major source of stone aggregate railway traffic, especially for road building and railway maintenance purposes. Transfer sidings for this traffic are next to the station and are controlled from the station signal box. This had to be relocated after a fatal accident at the station in August 1950. Six people were killed when a goods train that was shunting at the station in the early hours, hauled by the locomotive LMS Hughes Crab 2-6-0 No. 42885, was inadvertently diverted onto the main line, where it collided with the fast-moving eastbound Irish Mail express from Holyhead, which was being hauled by LMS Rebuilt Royal Scot Class 4-6-0 No. 46119 Lancashire Fusilier. The poor view afforded of the sidings from the old box was cited as one of the contributory factors to the accident.

There was an earlier accident near Penmaenmawr on 12 January 1899 when an express freight train, hauled by LNWR DX Goods Class 0-6-0 No. 1418, was derailed because a storm had washed away the trackbed. Both locomotive crew were killed.

== Facilities ==
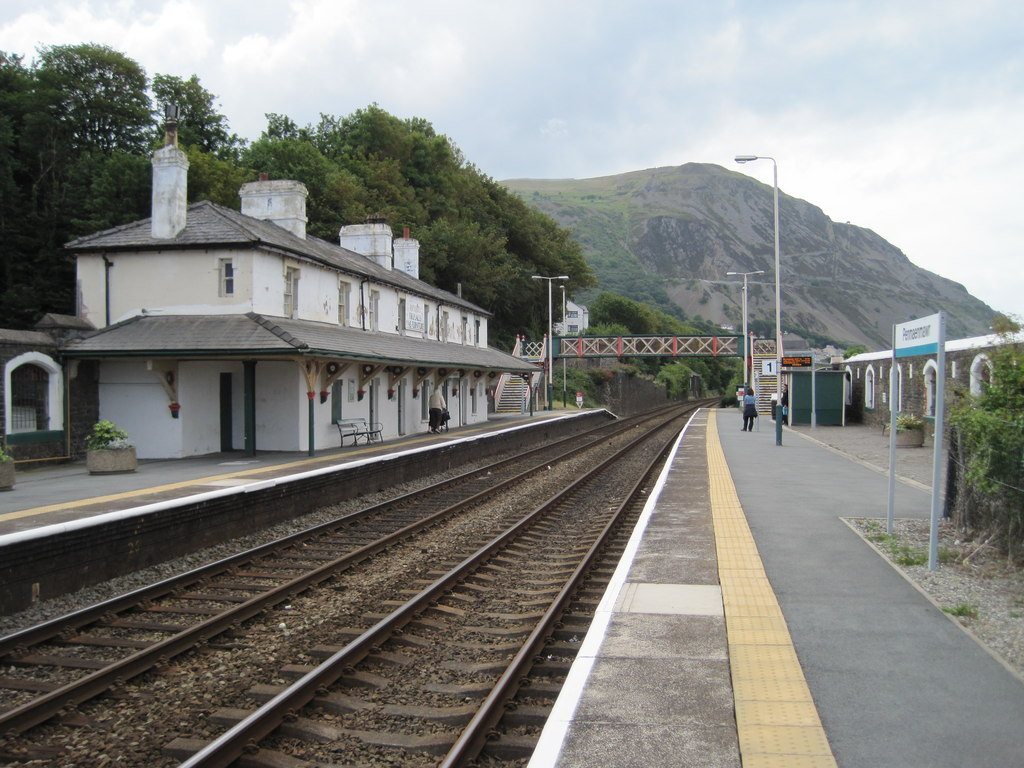
View west towards Llanfairfechan and Holyhead (June 2011)

The station is unstaffed, though it has kept its original Grade II listed buildings on the westbound platform; these are now used as private residential accommodation. There is no ticket machine, so all tickets must be purchased before travel or on the train. There is a waiting shelter on the eastbound platform, whilst canopies provide a covered waiting area on the opposite side. Train running information is offered via telephone, digital CIS displays and timetable posters. No level access is available to either platform, as the approach ramps on both sides are steeply graded and the footbridge linking the platforms has steps.

== Services ==
Penmaenmawr is served only by Transport for Wales Rail services.

On weekdays, westbound trains run to Holyhead, while eastbound services run via Chester and Shrewsbury to Birmingham International or Cardiff Central. The first eastbound service instead runs to Manchester Airport, while two evening services terminate at Crewe.

The Sunday service is infrequent (particularly in winter), with large gaps between trains. 9 services on a Sunday run to Holyhead, with 6 eastbound services. The first eastbound Sunday service runs to Manchester Piccadilly, the second Cardiff Central, with a five-hour gap before the remaining 4 services run to Crewe.

Preceding station	National Rail	Following station
Llanfairfechan	Transport for Wales North Wales Main Line	Conwy
