= High-pressure steam locomotive =

Steam locomotive with a boiler that operates at pressures well above normal

A high-pressure steam locomotive is a steam locomotive with a boiler that operates at pressures well above what would be considered normal for other locomotives. Most locomotives operate with a steam pressure of 200 to 300 psi (1.38 to 2.07 MPa). In the later years of steam, boiler pressures were typically 200 to 250 psi (1.38 to 1.72 MPa). High-pressure locomotives can be considered to start at 350 psi (2.41 MPa), when special construction techniques become necessary, but some had boilers that operated at over 1,500 psi (10.34 MPa).

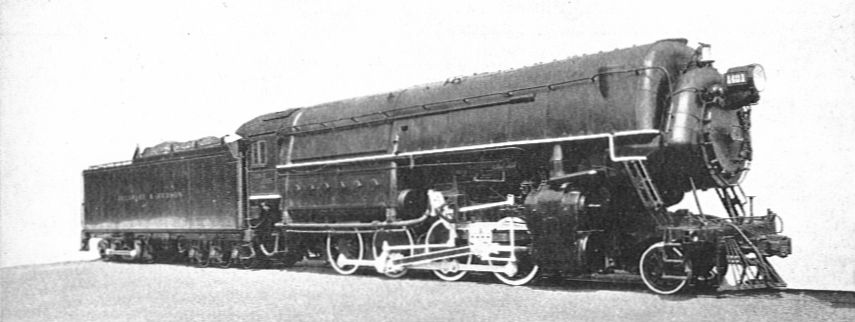
Delaware & Hudson No. 1401, John B. Jervis

== The reason for high pressure ==
Maximising the efficiency of a heat engine depends fundamentally upon getting the temperature at which heat is accepted (i.e. raising steam in the boiler) as far as possible from the temperature at which it is rejected (i.e. the steam when it leaves the cylinder). This was quantified by Nicolas Léonard Sadi Carnot.

There are two options: raise the acceptance temperature or lower the rejection temperature. For a steam engine, the former means raising steam at higher pressure and temperature, which is in engineering terms fairly straightforward. The latter can be implemented in two ways: bigger cylinders to allow the exhaust steam to expand further and/or condensing the exhaust to further lower the rejection temperature. However, both implementations are dead ends: the first one is limited by the loading gauge while the second one tends to be self-defeating because of frictional losses in the greatly increased volumes of exhaust steam to be handled.

Thus it has often been considered that high pressure is the way to go to improve locomotive fuel efficiency. However, experiments in this direction were always defeated by much increased purchase and maintenance costs. A simpler way to increase the acceptance temperature is to use a modest steam pressure and a superheater.

== Disadvantages of high pressure ==
=== Complexity ===
High-pressure locomotives were much more complicated than conventional designs. It was not simply a matter of building a normal fire-tube boiler with suitably increased strength and stoking harder. Structural strength requirements in the boiler shell make this impractical; it becomes impossibly thick and heavy. For high steam pressures the water-tube boiler is universally used. The steam drums and their interconnecting tubes are of relatively small diameter with thick walls and therefore much stronger.

=== Scale deposition ===
The next difficulty is that of scale deposition and corrosion in the boiler tubes. Scale deposited inside the tubes is invisible, usually inaccessible, and a deadly danger, as it leads to local overheating and failure of the tube. This was a major drawback with the early water-tube boilers, such as the Du Temple design, tested on the French Nord network in 1907 and 1910. Water tubes in Royal Navy boilers were checked for blockage by carefully dropping numbered balls down the curved tubes.

=== Safety concerns ===
A sudden steam leak into the firebox is perilous enough with a conventional boiler – the fire is likely to be blasted out of the firebox door, with unhappy results for anyone in the way. With a high-pressure boiler the results are even more dangerous because of the greater release of energy. This was demonstrated by the Fury tragedy, though the reason for the tube failure in that case was concluded to be overheating due to lack of steam flow rather than scaling.

== Jacob Perkins ==
An early experimenter with high-pressure steam was Jacob Perkins. Perkins applied his "hermetic tube" system to steam locomotive boilers and a number of locomotives using this principle were made in 1836 for the London and South Western Railway.

== The Schmidt system ==
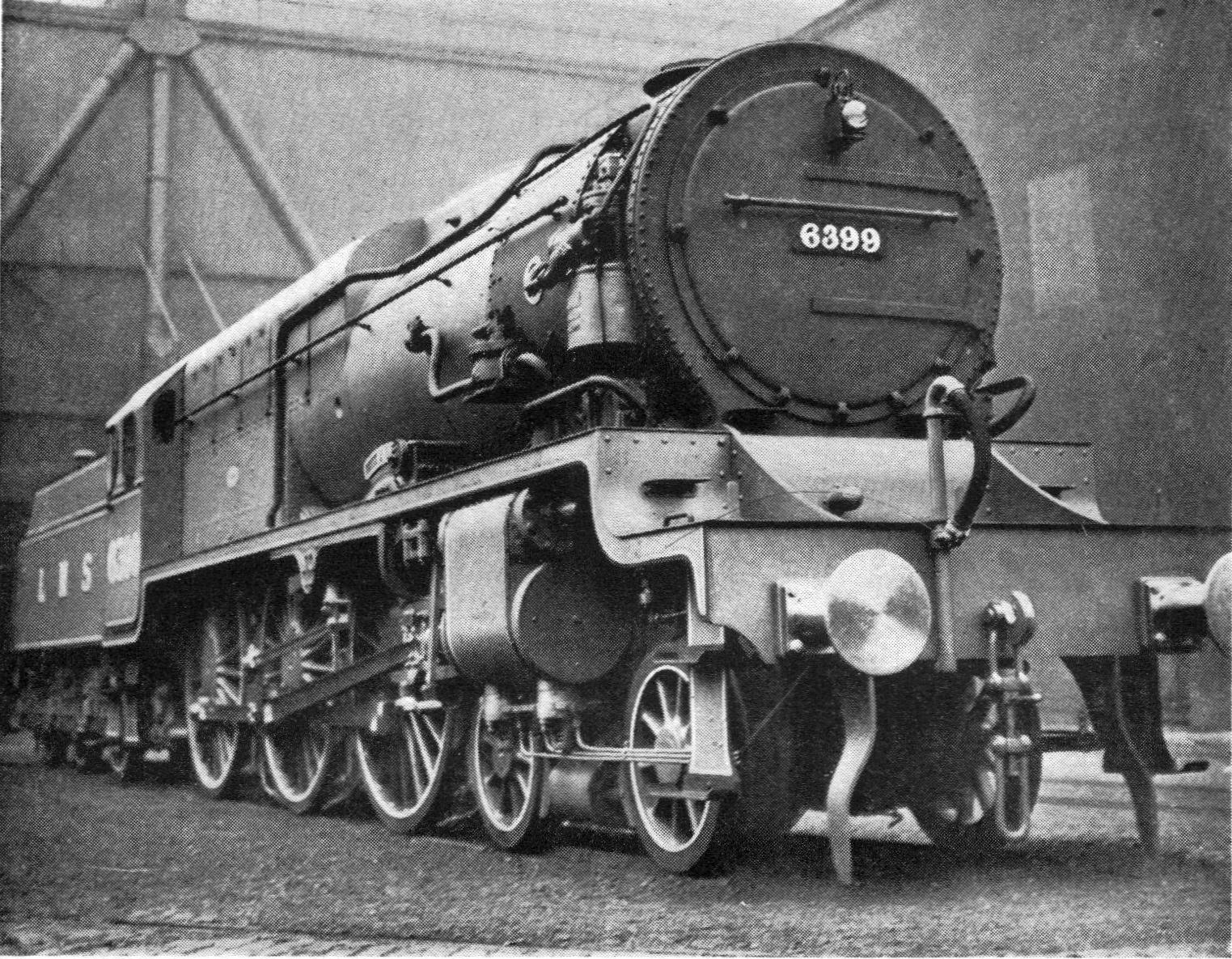
6399 Fury

One way to avoid corrosion and scale problems at high pressure is to use distilled water, as is done in power stations. Dissolved gases such as oxygen and carbon dioxide also cause corrosion at high temperatures and pressures, and must be kept out. Most locomotives did not have condensers, so there was no source of pure feed water. One solution was the Schmidt system.

=== Layout ===
The Schmidt system used a sealed ultra-high-pressure circuit that simply transferred heat to a high-pressure circuit, by means of heating coils inside a high-pressure boiler. If this latter was fed with ordinary water, scale could form on the outside of the heating coils, but it could not cause overheating because the ultra-HP tubes were quite capable of withstanding their internal steam temperature, though not the firebox flame temperature.

=== Pressures ===
The sealed ultra-high-pressure circuit ran at between 1,200 and 1,600 psi (8.27 and 11.03 MPa), depending on the rate of firing. The HP boiler worked at approx 850 psi (5.86 MPa), and the low-pressure boiler at 200 to 250 psi (1.38 to 1.72 MPa). The UHP and HP boilers were of a water-tube design, while the LP boiler was a fire-tube boiler typical for steam locomotives. The LP cylinders were driven with a mixture of the HP cylinder exhaust and the LP boiler output. Both HP and LP boilers had superheaters.

=== Examples ===
The French PL241P, the German H17-206 and the British LMS 6399 Fury all used the Schmidt system, and were of basically similar design. The New York Central HS-1a and the Canadian 8000 also used the Schmidt system but were a size larger altogether- the 8000 weighed more than twice the Fury.

== The Schwarzkopff-Löffler system ==
Another way to avoid scaling in the HP boiler is to use steam alone to transfer the heat from the fire; steam cannot of course deposit scale. Saturated steam from an HP steam generator was pumped through HP superheater tubes which lined the firebox. There it was superheated to about 900 °F (482 °C) and the pressure raised to 1,700 psi (11.72 MPa). Only a quarter of this was fed to the HP cylinders; the rest was returned to the steam generator where its heat evaporated more water to continue the cycle.

=== Steam circuit ===
The HP cylinder exhaust passed through an LP feed heater, and then the tubes of an LP boiler; this was roughly equivalent to the LP boiler in the Schmidt system, but was heated by HP exhaust steam not combustion gases. Steam was raised in the LP boiler at 225 psi (1.55 MPa), fed to the LP superheater, and then the LP cylinder. The LP exhaust fed the blastpipe in the smokebox. The HP exhaust condensed in the LP boiler heating tubes was pumped back to the HP steam generator. It was a complex system.

=== Example ===
The only locomotive built using this system was the German DRG H 02 1001 of 1930. It was not a success, being extremely unreliable.

== The straightforward approach ==
=== Fire-tube boiler ===
The Baldwin 60000 prototype worked at a relatively low 350 psi (2.41 MPa) and did not use either of the complex systems described above. It had both a relatively conventional water-tube boiler and a fire-tube boiler. Nevertheless, high maintenance costs and poor reliability negated the fuel economies promised by high-pressure and compounding, and the design was not repeated. Other moderately conventional high-pressure locomotives were built in the US, including the triple-expansion L F Loree locomotive of 1933, but none were successful.

H. W. Bell and company introduced a successful line of high-pressure locomotives in 1908 that continued in production into the 1920s. The basic technology used on these machines was derived from the Stanley Steamer. The smallest of these were narrow-gauge engines weighing only 5,000 pounds (2,300 kg) and with a 5-foot (1.5 m) wheelbase, but they operated at 500 psi (3.45 MPa) and the boilers were tested to 1,200 psi (8.27 MPa). The vertical fire-tube boiler was wound with piano wire, and the connecting rods and cranks were fully enclosed and geared to one axle. The Bell Locomotive Works advertised later models at a more conventional 325 psi (2.24 MPa) or 350 psi (2.41 MPa).

=== Water-tube boiler ===
In Great Britain, the LNER Class W1 was built with marine-type water-tube boiler working at 450 psi (3.10 MPa) in 1929. It was not very successful and was rebuilt with a conventional fire-tube boiler in 1936.

== See also ==
- Advanced steam technology
