= DRG H 17 206 =

Steam engine from the early 20th century

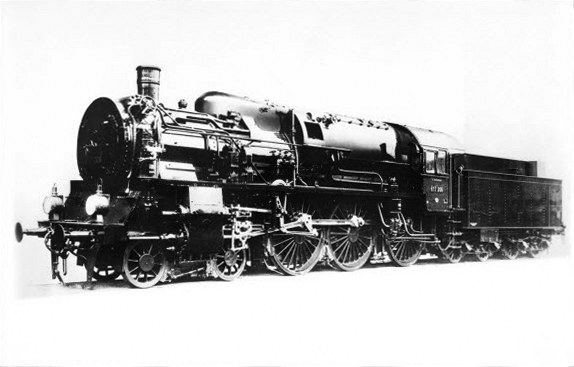
- H 17 206
Type and origin
- Power type: Steam
- Builder: Henschel & Sohn
- Serial number: 20445
- Build date: 1925
- Total produced: 1
Specifications
- Configuration
  - Whyte: 4-6-0
  - UIC: 2′C h3v
  - German: S 35.20
- Driver: 1st coupled axle
- Gauge: 1,435 mm (4 ft 8 1/2 in)
- Leading dia.: 1,000 mm (3 ft 3 3/8 in)
- Driver dia.: 1,980 mm (6 ft 6 in)
- Wheelbase
  - Axle spacing (Asymmetrical): 2,200 mm (7 ft 2 5/8 in) +; 2,250 mm (7 ft 4 5/8 in) +; 2,100 mm (6 ft 10 5/8 in) +; 2,600 mm (8 ft 6 3/8 in) =
  - Engine: 9,150 mm (30 ft 1/4 in)
  - Tender: 1,800 mm (5 ft 10 7/8 in) +; 2,000 mm (6 ft 6 3/4 in) +; 1,800 mm (5 ft 10 7/8 in) =; 5,600 mm (18 ft 4 1/2 in)
  - incl. tender: 17,470 mm (57 ft 3 3/4 in)
- Length
  - Over headstocks: 19,900 mm (65 ft 3 1/2 in)
  - Over buffers: 21,200 mm (69 ft 6 5/8 in)
- Tender type: pr. 2′2′ T 31.5
- Fuel type: Coal
- Fuel capacity: 7 t (6.9 long tons; 7.7 short tons)
- Water cap.: 31.5 m^{3} (31,500 L; 6,900 imp gal; 8,300 US gal)
- Firebox
  - Grate area: 2.56 m^{2} (27.6 sq ft)
- Boiler
  - Pitch: 2,800 mm (9 ft 2 1/4 in)
  - Large tubes: 83 mm (3 1/4 in), 116 off
- Boiler pressure: HP: 60 bar (61.2 kp/cm^{2}; 870 psi); LP: 14 bar (14.3 kp/cm^{2}; 203 psi)
- Heating surface
  - Firebox: 20.2 m^{2} (217 sq ft)
  - Flues: 117.0 m^{2} (1,259 sq ft)
  - Total surface: 137.5 m^{2} (1,480 sq ft)
- Superheater
  - Heating area: 82.5 m^{2} (888 sq ft)
- Cylinders: Three: one HP inside, two LP outside
- High-pressure cylinder: 290 mm × 630 mm (11 7/16 in × 24 13/16 in)
- Low-pressure cylinder: 500 mm × 630 mm (19 11/16 in × 24 13/16 in)
Performance figures
- Maximum speed: 120 km/h (75 mph)
Career
- Operators: Deutsche Reichsbahn
- Numbers: H 17 206
- Retired: 1937
- Disposition: rebuilt back to normal S 10.2 in 1938

H 17 206 was a high pressure steam locomotive built in Germany in 1925 by Henschel, on the Schmidt system. It was rebuilt from a Prussian S 10.2, that had been built by Hanomag in 1915.

It continued in its rebuilt form until retirement in March 1937, and was later converted back to its original form and saw service until final retirement in September 1948.

The H 17 206 was not repeated.
