= Llanfairfechan railway station =

Railway station in Llanfairfechan, Conwy, Wales

Llanfairfechan
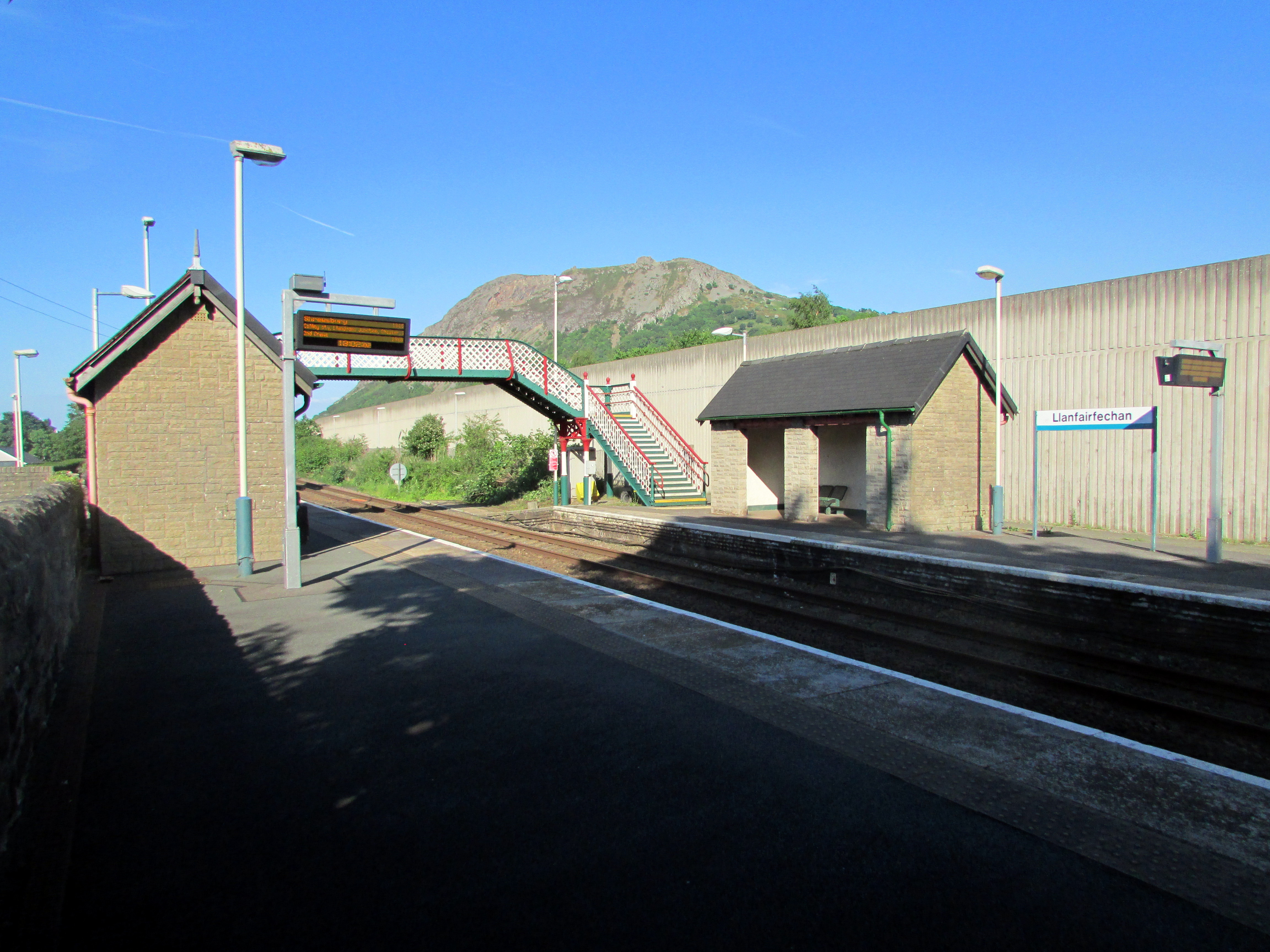

General information
- Location: Llanfairfechan, Conwy; Wales
- Coordinates: 53.257°N 3.983°W
- Grid reference: SH677751
- Manager: Transport for Wales Rail
- Platforms: 2

Other information
- Station code: LLF
- Classification: DfT category F1

History
- Opened: 1 May 1860

Passengers
- 2021/22: ▲23,216
- 2022/23: ▲27,962
- 2023/24: ▲38,910
- 2024/25: ▼37,652
- 2025/26: ▲44,210
Location
Notes
- Passenger statistics from the Office of Rail and Road

Llanfairfechan railway station serves the town of Llanfairfechan in the Conwy County Borough of North Wales, and is located on the Crewe to Holyhead North Wales Coast Line.

== History ==
It was opened on 1 May 1860 by the London and North Western Railway, some twelve years after the line serving it. It was provided with a goods yard, signal box and a sizeable station building on the eastbound platform. A camping coach was positioned here by the London Midland Region from 1960 to 1964. Goods traffic ceased here in June 1964, but it remained open for passenger services. The station building was demolished in 1987, during construction work for the A55 North Wales Coast dual carriageway which runs next to the railway at this location - the site was also altered (the retaining wall for the road backs directly onto the eastbound platform) and the station temporarily closed as a consequence of this. The station reopened once the work was complete. The original station footbridge still stands, but the other surviving structures all date from the 1987 alterations.

== Facilities ==
No permanent buildings are left here now besides the footbridge and a stone shelter on each side, the station is unstaffed. Tickets must be purchased from the guard on the train or before travel, as no ticket machine is present. Train running details are offered via telephone, digital display screens, or timetable poster boards. Though the footbridge has steps, the station is fully accessible for a wheelchair or mobility-impaired users via ramps from the West Shore or the footpath from the town centre next to the A55.

== Services ==
Llanfairfechan is served by Transport for Wales services only.

As of the December 2023 timetable change, there are 11 trains per weekday to Holyhead, and service frequency varies between being 1 train per hour (tph), 1 train per 2 hours, and 1 train per 3 hours. On Saturdays there are 10 trains per day to Holyhead and on Sundays there are 8 trains per day.

There is typically a two-hourly service starting at Holyhead which runs to Birmingham International via Chester and Shrewsbury.

Other Chester-bound services usually run to Cardiff Central, Crewe, Manchester Airport or terminate at Shrewsbury.

Through services to Chester run via Colwyn Bay, Rhyl, Prestatyn and Flint.

There is also a limited Sunday service, which mainly runs to/from Crewe in the mid-afternoon to evenings.

Preceding station	National Rail	Following station
Penmaenmawr	Transport for Wales North Wales Main Line	Bangor (Gwynedd)
