= Conwy railway station =

Railway station in Conwy, Wales

Conwy
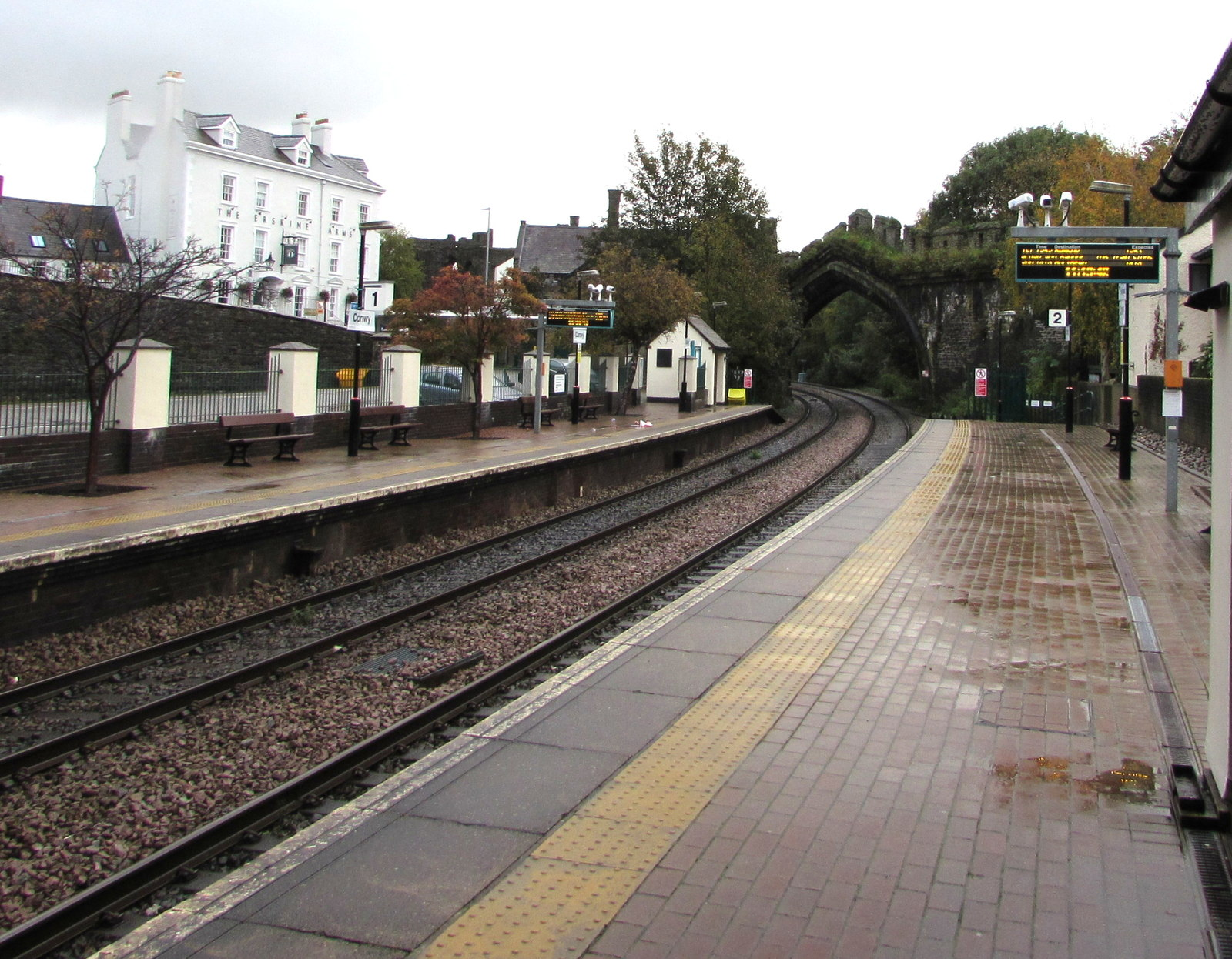

General information
- Location: Conwy, Conwy; Wales
- Coordinates: 53.280°N 3.831°W
- Grid reference: SH770784
- Managed by: Transport for Wales Rail
- Platforms: 2

Other information
- Station code: CNW
- Classification: DfT category F2

History
- Opened: 1848
- Original company: Chester and Holyhead Railway
- Pre-grouping: London and North Western Railway
- Post-grouping: London, Midland and Scottish Railway

Key dates
- 1 May 1848: Opened as Conway
- 14 February 1966: Closed
- 29 June 1987: Reopened as Conwy
- 6 July 2020: Temporarily closed
- 29 March 2021: Reopened

Passengers
- 2020/21: ▼3,280
- 2021/22: ▲28,038
- 2022/23: ▲52,568
- 2023/24: ▲67,464
- 2024/25: ▲83,682
Location
Notes
- Passenger statistics from the Office of Rail and Road

Conwy railway station serves the town of Conwy, north Wales, and is located on the North Wales Main Line, between Llandudno Junction and Penmaenmawr, 224 miles 40 chains (361.3 km) from London Euston, measured via Crewe. It is served by Transport for Wales, who manage the station.

== History ==
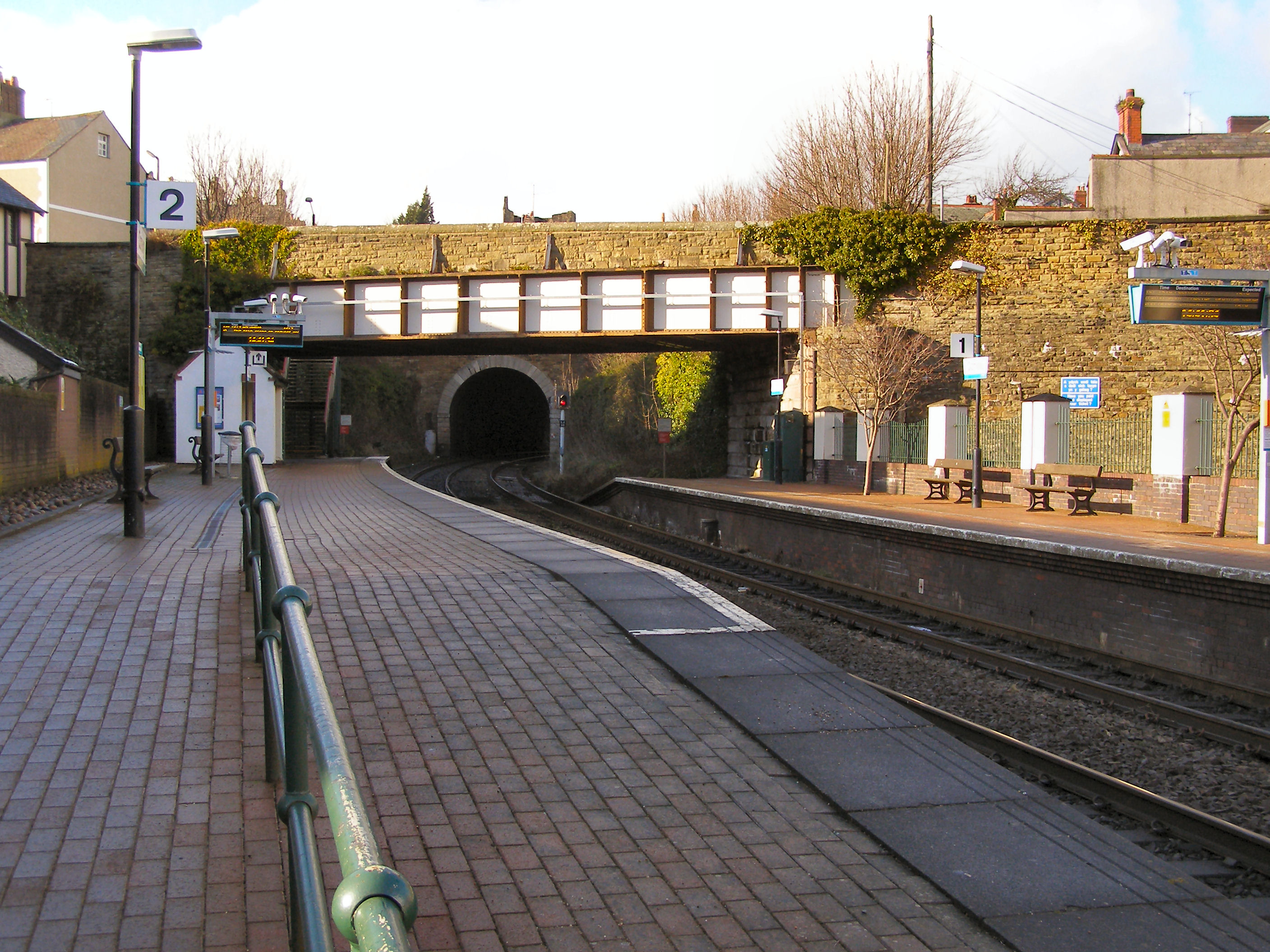
The station in 2010

The station was opened by the Chester and Holyhead Railway on 1 May 1848. It was closed as part of the Beeching cuts on 14 February 1966 but reopened on 29 June 1987 as a request stop. Upon reopening, the Welsh spelling Conwy was adopted, in contrast to the Anglicised form Conway used until closure in 1966.

The original station had substantial decorated mock-Tudor style buildings on both sides (being sited within the town walls), along with canopies and a footbridge - this was however demolished soon after closure and no trace now remains.

From 6 July 2020, trains did not call at the station due to the short platform and the inability to maintain social distancing between passengers and the guard when opening the train door. A limited service had returned by 29 March 2021.

== Facilities ==
Each platform has an open sided shelter for waiting passengers, a customer help point, timetable poster boards and digital CIS displays. There is no ticketing provision and the station is unstaffed - tickets must be bought on the train or in advance of travel. Step-free access is available (via ramps) to both sides.

== Passenger volume ==
Passenger volume at Conwy
	2004–05	2005–06	2006–07	2007–08	2008–09	2009–10	2010–11	2011–12	2012–13	2013–14	2014–15	2015–16	2016–17	2017–18	2018–19	2019–20	2020–21	2021–22	2022–23	2023–24	2024–25
Entries and exits	18,539	19,131	23,411	26,000	30,240	27,168	32,156	38,130	38,412	38,982	41,560	46,336	48,832	57,006	59,030	57,486	3,280	28,038	52,568	67,464	83,682

The statistics cover twelve month periods that start in April.

== Services ==
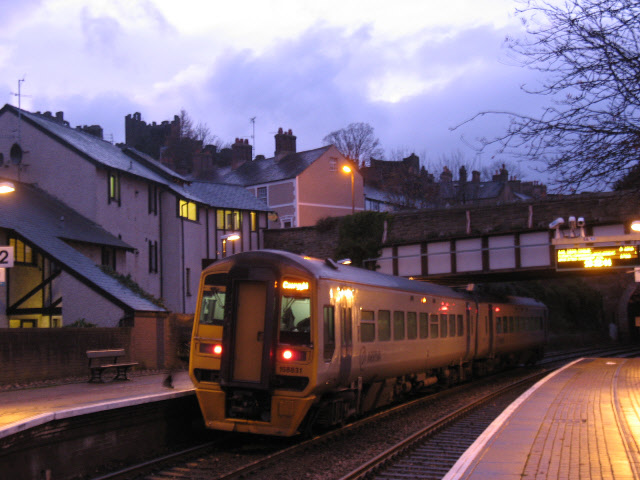
An Arriva Trains Wales service calls at the station at dusk

Conwy is served only by Transport for Wales Rail services on request.

The Monday to Friday service pattern is as follows:

Westbound:

- 11 trains per day (tpd) run to Holyhead

Eastbound:

- 1 tp2h run to Birmingham International
- 1 tpd runs to Manchester Airport via Warrington Bank Quay
- 2 tpd run to Cardiff Central
- 1 tpd terminates at Shrewsbury
- 2 tpd run to Crewe
- 1 tpd terminates at Birmingham New Street.

Service frequency varies between being 1 train per hour (tph), 1 train per 2 hours and 1 train per 3 hours.

On Saturdays there are 10 trains per day to Holyhead, and the Manchester Airport service does not run. Eastbound services run to Birmingham and Cardiff via Chester and Shrewsbury.

The Sunday service is infrequent (particularly in winter), with large gaps between trains. 9 services on a Sunday run to Holyhead, with 6 eastbound services. The first eastbound Sunday service runs to Manchester Piccadilly, the second Cardiff Central, with a five hour gap before the remaining 4 services run to Crewe.

Preceding station	National Rail	Following station
Penmaenmawr	Transport for Wales North Wales Main Line	Llandudno Junction
