= PLM 241 B 1 =

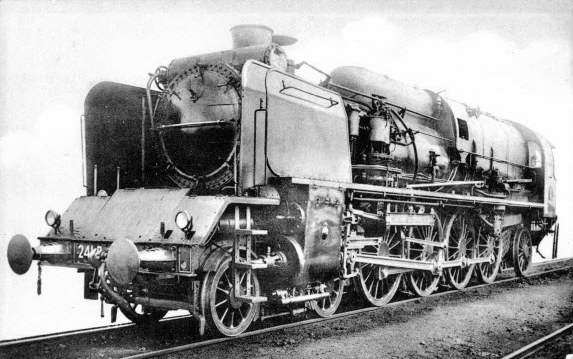
Type and origin
- Power type: Steam
- Builder: Henschel & Sohn
- Build date: 1929
- Total produced: 1
Specifications
- Configuration
  - Whyte: 4-8-2
  - UIC: 2′D1′h4v
- Gauge: 1,435 mm (4 ft 8 1/2 in) standard gauge
- Driver dia.: 1,800 mm (70.9 in)
- Length: 16,125 mm (52 ft 11 in)
- Width: 115.44 t (113.62 long tons; 127.25 short tons)
- Firebox
  - Grate area: 3.9 m^{2} (42 sq ft)
- Boiler: 3-stage
- Boiler pressure: HP: 110 bar (11.0 MPa; 1,600 psi), MP: 58 bar (5.80 MPa; 841 psi), LP: 13 bar (1.30 MPa; 189 psi)
- Heating surface: 187 m^{2} (2,010 sq ft)
- Superheater
  - Heating area: 95 m^{2} (1,020 sq ft)
- High-pressure cylinder: 240 mm × 650 mm (9.45 in × 25.59 in)
- Low-pressure cylinder: 500 mm × 700 mm (19.7 in × 27.6 in)
Performance figures
- Maximum speed: 110 km/h (68 mph)
Career
- Operators: PLM
- Class: 241 B
- Numbers: 241 B 1
- Scrapped: 1936

The PLM 241 B 1 was a high-pressure steam locomotive built in 1929 for the PLM (Chemins de fer de Paris à Lyon et à la Méditerranée) using the Schmidt high-pressure system. It was a 4-cylinder compound design.

The manufacturer was Henschel & Sohn of Germany. It was considered unusual for a French railway to buy German technology due to deteriorating relations between the two countries at the time. Schmidt and Henschel appeared to be the only sources of suitable technology.

Only one was built. The locomotive was scrapped in 1936.

- Boiler: 3-stage boiler:
  - high pressure circuit: 110 bars (11.00 MPa; 1,595.42 psi)
  - secondary circuit: 58 bars (5.80 MPa; 841.22 psi)
  - low-pressure circuit: 13 bars (1.3 MPa; 190 psi)
- Power: 2,530 horsepower (1.89 MW)
- Speed (attained): 110 km/h (68 mph)
