= LMS Rebuilt Royal Scot Class =

British steam locomotive class (1943–1966)

LMS Royal Scot Class
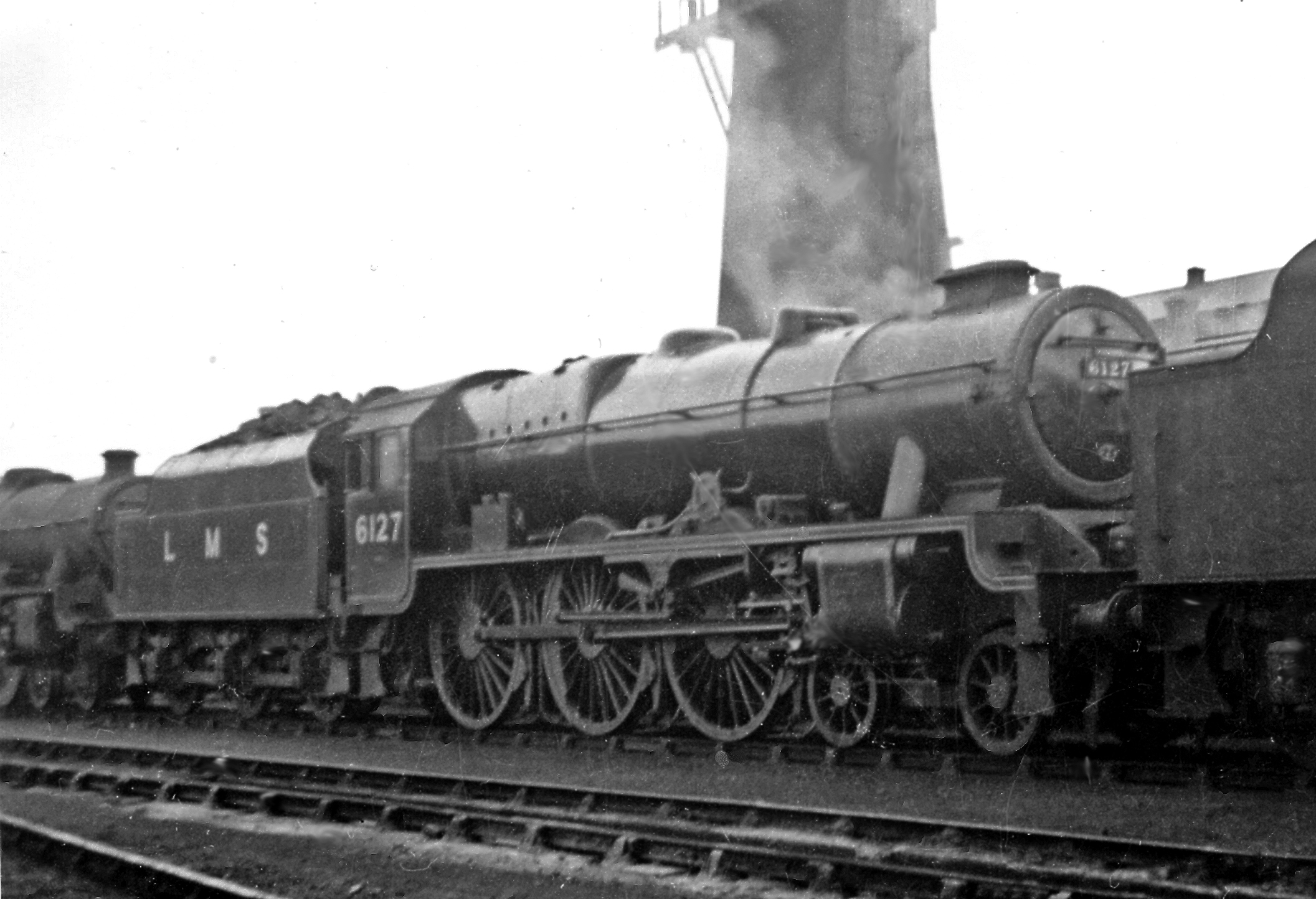
- 6127 The Old Contemptibles, as rebuilt in 1944
Type and origin
- Power type: Steam
- Designer: Sir William Stanier
- Rebuilder: LMS Derby Works
- Rebuild date: 1943–1955
- Number rebuilt: 70
Specifications
- Configuration
  - Whyte: 4-6-0
  - UIC: 2′C h3
- Gauge: 4 ft 8 1/2 in (1,435 mm) standard gauge
- Leading dia.: 3 ft 3 1/2 in (1.003 m)
- Driver dia.: 6 ft 9 in (2.057 m)
- Length: 63 ft 0 1/2 in (19.22 m)
- Loco weight: 84.90 long tons (86.26 t; 95.09 short tons)
- Tender weight: 54.65 long tons (55.53 t; 61.21 short tons)
- Water cap.: 4,000 imp gal (18,000 L; 4,800 US gal)
- Tender cap.: 9 long tons (9.1 t; 10 short tons)
- Boiler: 2A
- Boiler pressure: 250 psi (1.72 MPa) superheated
- Cylinders: Three
- Cylinder size: 18 in × 26 in (457 mm × 660 mm)
- Valve gear: Walschaerts
- Valve type: Piston valves
Performance figures
- Tractive effort: 33,150 lbf (147.46 kN)
Career
- Operators: London, Midland and Scottish Railway; → British Railways
- Power class: 6P; reclassified 7P in 1951
- Numbers: LMS: 6100–6169; BR: 46100–46169
- Axle load class: BR: Route Availability 9
- Withdrawn: 1962-1966
- Disposition: Two preserved; remainder scrapped

The London, Midland and Scottish Railway (LMS) Rebuilt Royal Scot Class is a class of 4-6-0 steam locomotives. 70 members of this class were rebuilt by the LMS and its successor British Railways (BR) from LMS Royal Scot Class engines by the replacement of their life expired parallel boilers with a type 2A boiler over the period 1943–1955. (The class sometimes is numbered 71 as it included a prototype 1935 rebuild LMS (4)6170 British Legion, but sufficient technical differences existed which dictate that it is treated separately). They were the second class to be rebuilt with type-2 boilers, after the rebuilding of British Legion and the Jubilee Class.

LMS gave them the power classification 6P; this was later revised by BR to 7P.

== Rebuilding ==
Year	Number rebuilt	Numbers
1943	9	6103/8/9/12/7/24/5/32/46
1944	9	6116/9/20/7/9/31/3/8/45
1945	11	6101/22/6/44/9/50/2/9/60/6/9
1946	10	6104/14/8/21/8/39/47/57/61/8
1947	3	6111/5/35
1948	4	46105/54/62/7
1949	6	46102/6/23/30/43/53
1950	6	46100/7/13/36/41/55
1951	2	46142/64
1952	3	46140/58/65
1953	4	46110/34/51/63
1954	2	46148/56
1955	1	46137
Total	70	

== 1948 Exchange trials ==
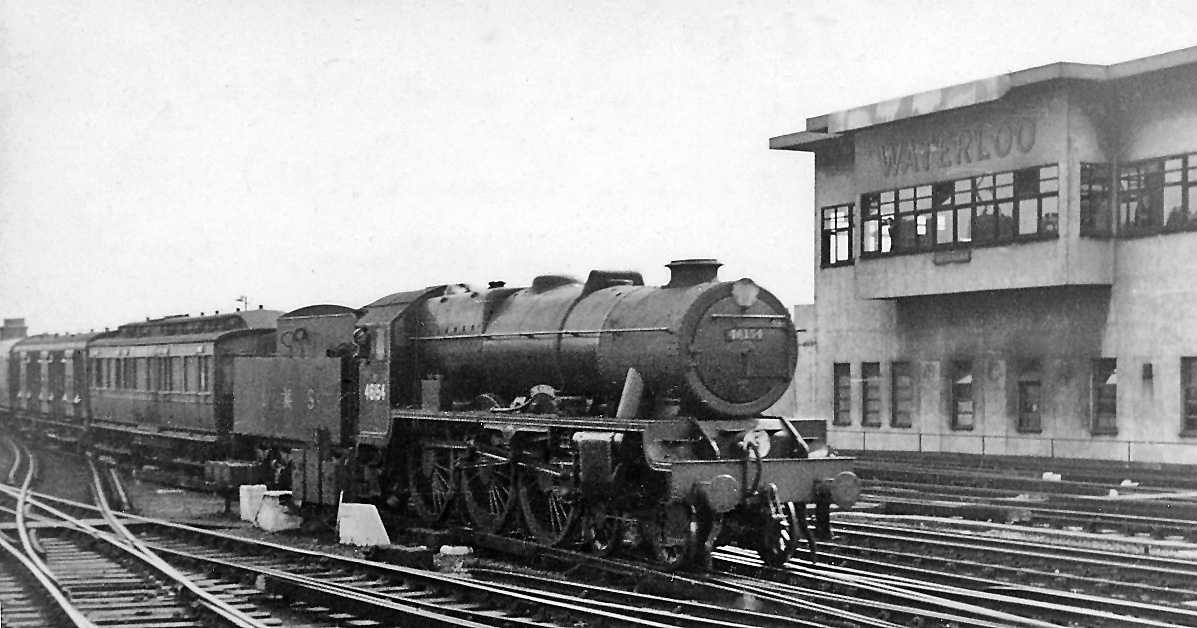
46154 The Hussar during the 1948 exchange trails with an ex-WD tender.

In the 1948 Locomotive Exchange Trials, carried out by the recently nationalised British Railways, involved 46154 The Hussar and 46162 Queens Westminster Rifleman. Apparently a rebuilt 'Royal Scot' proved capable of matching the maximum performance of larger Pacifics.

== Accidents ==
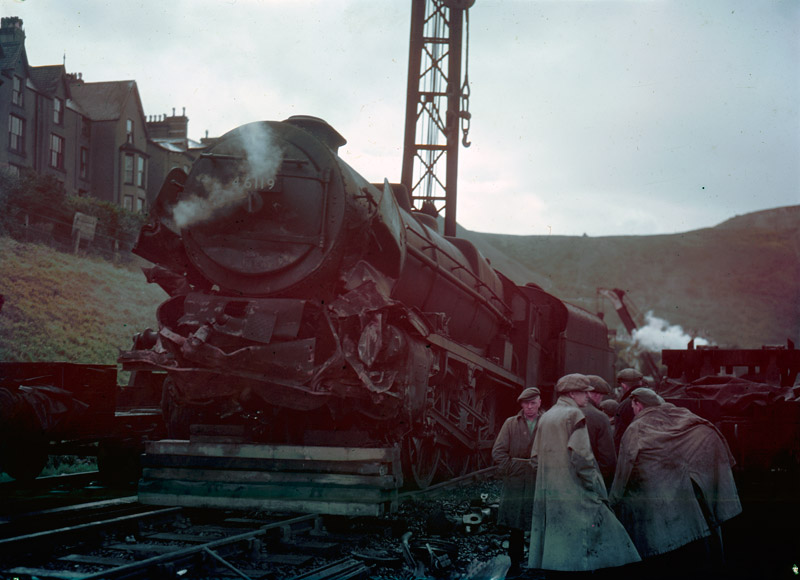
The aftermath of the Penmaenmawr railway accident in 1950 - 46119 Lancashire Fusilier with accident damage

- On 27 August 1950, 46119 Lancashire Fusilier was hauling the Irish Mail which was in a rear-end collision with a light engine LMS Hughes Crab No. 42885 at Penmaenmawr, Denbighshire due to a signalman's error. Six people died as a result of the crash.
- On 21 April 1952, 46117 Welsh Guardsman was one of two hauling an express passenger train which derailed at Blea Moor Loops, West Riding of Yorkshire due to a defect on the other locomotive causing a set of points to move under the train.

== Withdrawal ==
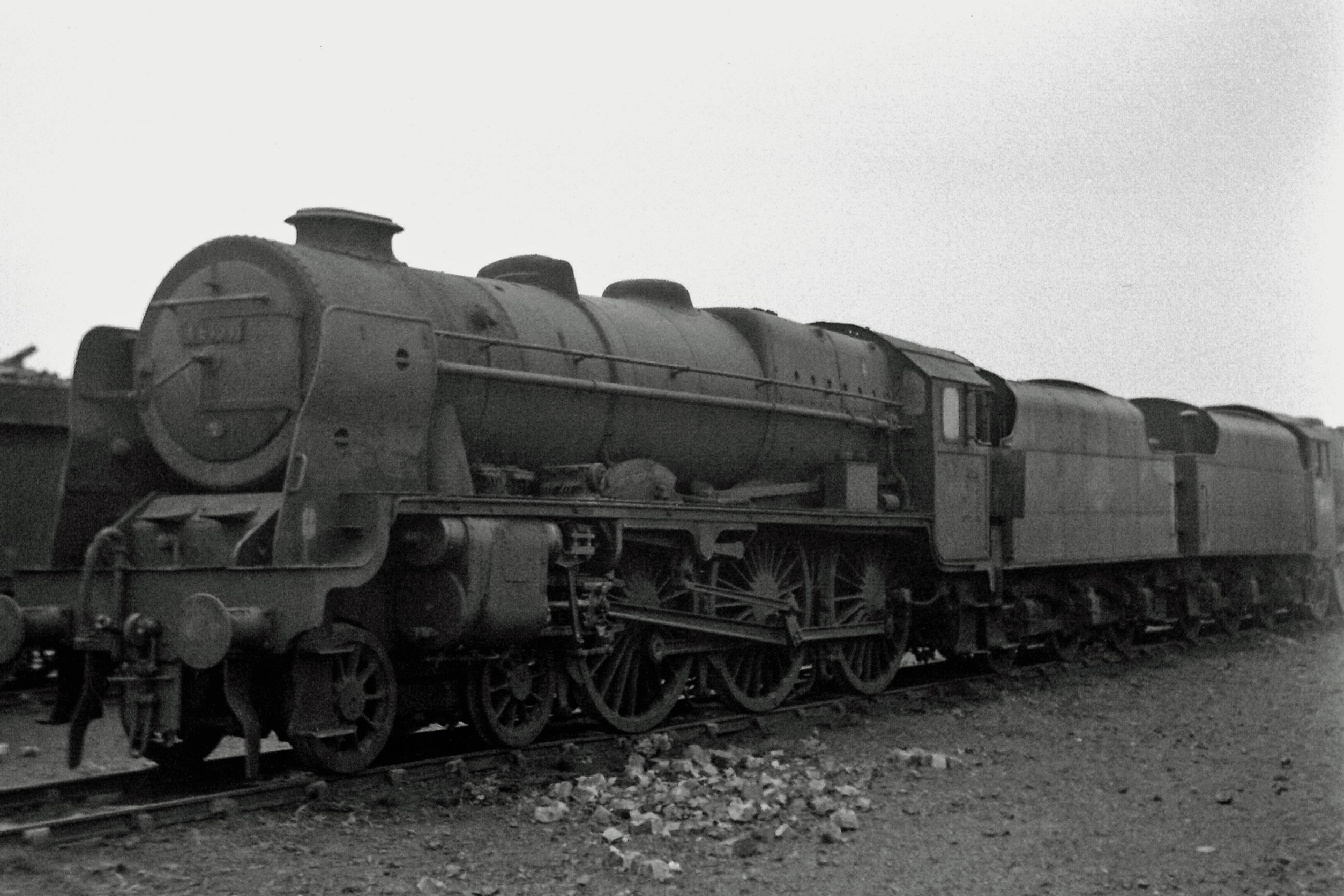
46151 The Royal Horse Guardsman, dumped at Staveley MPD in 1963 - she had been withdrawn the previous year.

All were withdrawn between 1962 and 1965 in accordance with the 1955 Modernisation Plan.

Table of withdrawals
Year	Quantity in service at start of year	Quantity withdrawn	Locomotive numbers
1962	70	30	46100/02–07/09/13/17/21/23–24/27/30–32/34–35/37/39/45–47/51/53–54/59/61/64
1963	40	15	46101/08/11/14/16/19–20/26/33/38/43/49–50/58/69
1964	25	20	46110/12/18/22/25/29/36/41–42/44/48/55–57/62–63/65–68
1965	5	4	46128/40/52/60
1966	1	1	46115

== Preservation ==
Of the 70 engines to be rebuilt only 2 members of the class have survived into preservation.

Number		Name	Builder	Built	Withdrawn	Livery	Location	Owners	Status	Photograph
LMS	BR	Name	Builder	Built	Withdrawn	Livery	Location	Owners	Status	Photograph
6100 (former 6152)	46100	Royal Scot (former "The King's Dragoon Guardsman")	Derby Works	Jun 1930 (Original engine built Oct 1927)	Oct 1962	BR Green, Early Emblem	Crewe Diesel TMD	Royal Scot Locomotive and General Trust	Operational, Mainline Certified.	
6115	46115	Scots Guardsman	North British Locomotive Company	Oct 1927	Jan 1966	BR Green, Late Crest	Carnforth MPD	David Smith	Operational, Mainline Certified. Mainline Ticket Expires: 2026	
