= LMS Royal Scot Class 6100 Royal Scot =

Preserved British steam locomotive

LMS 6100/46100 Royal Scot
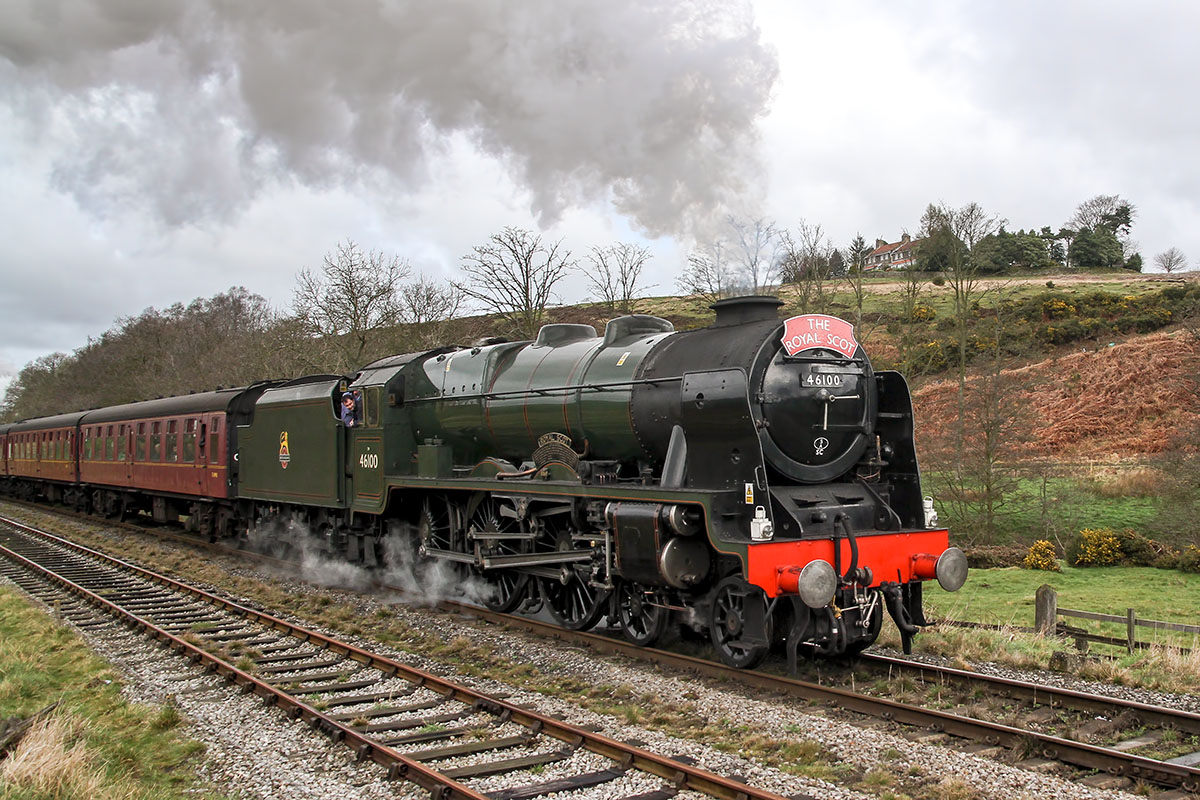
- 46100 Royal Scot on the NYMR in 2017.
Type and origin
- Power type: Steam
- Designer: William Stanier
- Build date: 1927 (original), 1930 (6152)
- Rebuilder: Crewe Works
- Rebuild date: June 1950
Specifications
- Configuration
  - Whyte: 4-6-0
  - UIC: 2′C h3
- Gauge: 4 ft 8 1/2 in (1,435 mm)
- Leading dia.: 3 ft 3 1/2 in (1.003 m)
- Driver dia.: 6 ft 9 in (2.057 m)
- Length: 63 ft 0 1/2 in (19.22 m)
- Loco weight: 84.90 long tons (86.26 t; 95.09 short tons)
- Fuel type: Coal
- Fuel capacity: 9 long tons (9.1 t; 10.1 short tons)
- Water cap.: 3,500 imp gal (16,000 L; 4,200 US gal) later: 4,000 imp gal (18,000 L; 4,800 US gal)
- Boiler: 2A
- Boiler pressure: 225 lbf/in^{2} (1.55 MPa)
- Cylinders: Three
- Cylinder size: 18 in × 26 in (457 mm × 660 mm)
- Valve gear: Walschaerts
- Valve type: Piston valves
Performance figures
- Tractive effort: 33,150 lbf (147.46 kN)
Career
- Operators: London, Midland and Scottish Railway; British Railways
- Power class: 6P; reclassified 7P in 1951
- Numbers: BR: 46100
- Axle load class: BR: Route Availability 9
- Withdrawn: October 1962
- Current owner: Royal Scot Locomotive & General Trust
- Disposition: Preserved, Mainline Certified

London, Midland and Scottish Railway (LMS) Rebuilt Royal Scot Class 6100 (British Railways' number 46100) Royal Scot is a preserved British steam locomotive. The locomotive was previously 6152 King's Dragoon Guardsman prior to an identity swap with 6100 in 1933.

== History ==
The original 6100 was the first of its class, built in 1927 by the North British Locomotive Company in Glasgow. It was named Royal Scot after the Royal Scots.

In 1933, No. 6152 The King's Dragoon Guardsman and 6100 swapped identities permanently. 6152 had been built at Derby Works in 1930. The new Royal Scot was sent to the Century of Progress Exposition of 1933 and toured Canada and the United States with a train of typical LMS carriages.

The locomotive was shipped, partially disassembled, aboard the Canadian Pacific ship SS Beaverdale.

Following the tour, special commemorative plates were fitted below the nameplates which read:

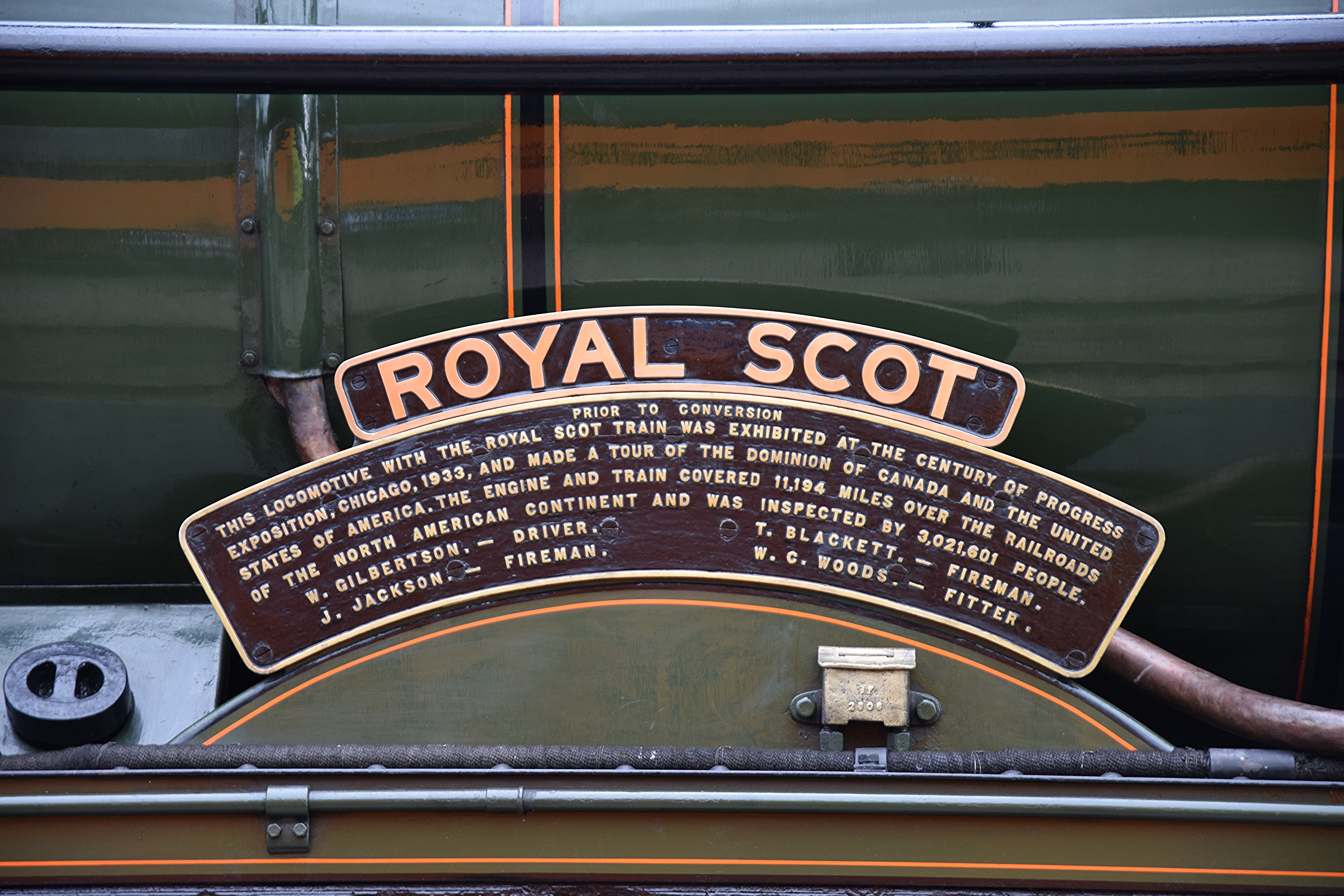
The left-hand nameplate, as preserved.

This locomotive with the Royal Scot train was exhibited at the Century of Progress
Exposition Chicago 1933, and made a tour of the Dominion of Canada and the
United States of America. The engine and train covered 11,194 miles over the railroads
of the North American continent and was inspected by 3,021,601 people.
W. Gilbertson - Driver	T. Blackett - Fireman
J. Jackson - Fireman	W.C. Woods - Fitter

6100 was renumbered 46100 by British Railways after nationalisation in 1948. In 1950, 46100 was rebuilt with a 2A taper boiler, and the words "Prior to conversion" were added to its nameplates. It became a markedly different engine. In October 1962, 46100 was withdrawn from service in Nottingham.

== Allocations ==
The shed locations of [4]6100 on particular dates:

November 1935	Camden, 1B
April 1944	Camden, 1B
November 1950	Camden, 1B
April 1960	Nottingham, 16A
October 1962	Withdrawn

== Preservation ==
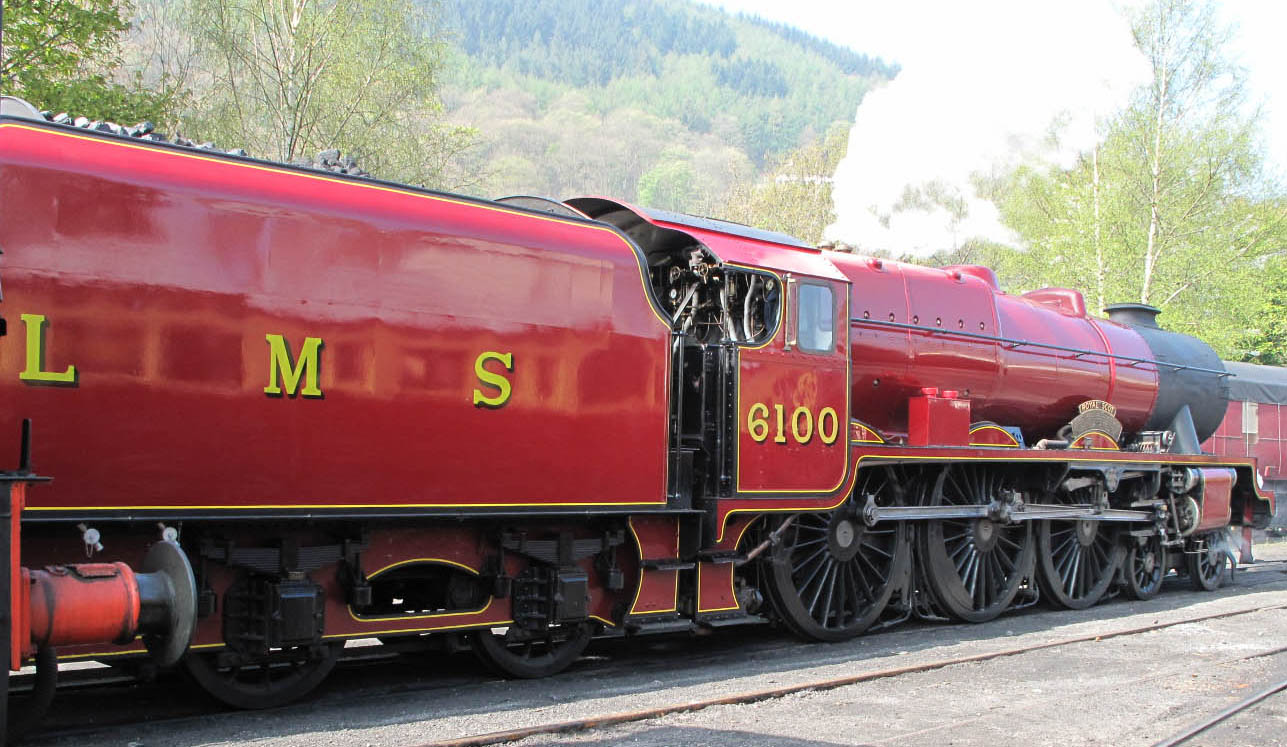
6100 Royal Scot on shed at the Llangollen Railway

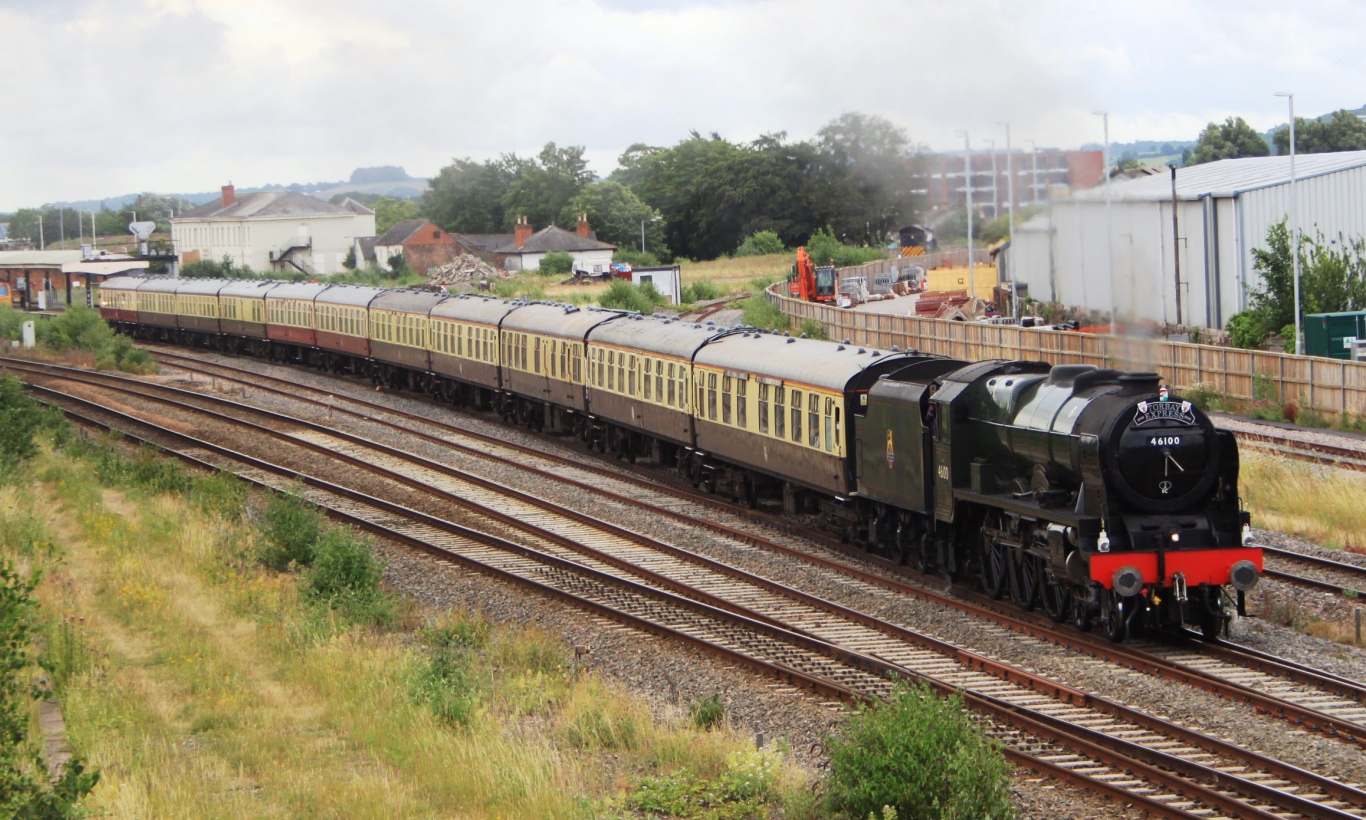
46100 Royal Scot on the Torbay Express tour near Taunton, 2016.

46100 was bought by Billy Butlin of Butlins holiday camps after withdrawal and after cosmetic restoration into LMS crimson lake at Crewe Works, although this was the original livery received, the locomotive did not carry it after being rebuilt (only one rebuilt Royal Scot ever carried LMS crimson lake livery and that was 6170 British Legion). It was then towed from Crewe Works to Nottingham by Black 5 No. 45038 and then from Nottingham to Boston by B1 No. 61177 on 12 June 1963.

After spending a few days at Boston shed it was taken to Skegness by an Ivatt 4MT Class. Then it was in the goods yard for three weeks before being taken by a Pickford's low loader by road to Ingoldmells.

Royal Scot arrived at Butlins on 18 July 1963 piped in by pipers from the 1st Battalion, The Royal Scots. This made 6100 one of two preserved rebuilt Royal Scots, the other being 6115 Scots Guardsman. It was set on a plinth at Skegness and was to remain there till the 1970s. On 16 March 1971, 6100 departed from Skegness for the Bressingham Steam Museum and was returned to steam in 1972. It ran until 1978 when it once more became a static exhibit, it was eventually sold from Butlins to Bressingham in May 1989.

After sale to the Royal Scot Locomotive and General Trust (RSL&GT) in April 2009, it was moved by road to Pete Waterman's LNWR Heritage workshops in Crewe.

On 20 March 2009, Royal Scot caught fire en route to a steam gala at the West Somerset Railway. The locomotive was being transported along the M5 Motorway when a fire started on the lorry under the loco's leading wheels. The engine was later withdrawn from service due to a number of mechanical problems after completion from its previous restoration and it was decided to give the engine a complete overhaul to mainline standards.

It performed its light and loaded test runs on Tuesday 22 & Wednesday 23 December 2015 and worked its debut railtour on Saturday 6 February 2016.

Royal Scot is currently stored at the One:One Collection in Margate.
