= LMS Royal Scot Class =

Class of British 3-cylinder locomotives

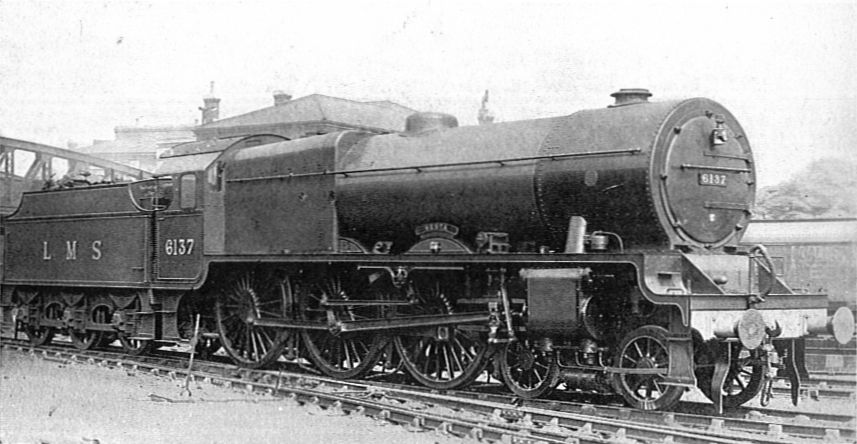
- LMS Royal Scot Class No. 6137 Vesta, circa 1928.
Type and origin
- Power type: Steam
- Designer: Sir Henry Fowler rebuilt: Sir William Stanier
- Builder: North British Locomotive Company (50); LMS, Derby Works (20)
- Order number: LMS Lot 41 (50) and 73 (20)
- Serial number: NBL: 23595–23644
- Build date: 1927, 1930
- Total produced: 70
- Rebuilder: LMS Derby Works
- Rebuild date: 1943–1955
Specifications
- Configuration
  - Whyte: 4-6-0
  - UIC: 2′C h3
- Gauge: 4 ft 8 1/2 in (1,435 mm) standard gauge
- Leading dia.: 3 ft 3 1/2 in (1.003 m)
- Driver dia.: 6 ft 9 in (2.057 m)
- Length: 63 ft 0 1/2 in (19.22 m)
- Loco weight: 84.90 long tons (86.26 t; 95.09 short tons)
- Tender weight: New: 42.70 long tons (43.39 t; 47.82 short tons) later: 54.65 long tons (55.53 t; 61.21 short tons)
- Water cap.: New: 3,500 imp gal (16,000 L; 4,200 US gal) later: 4,000 imp gal (18,000 L; 4,800 US gal)
- Tender cap.: New: 5.5 long tons (5.6 t; 6.2 short tons) later: 9 long tons (9.1 t; 10 short tons)
- Boiler: G10¼S; rebuilt: 2A
- Boiler pressure: 250 psi (1.72 MPa) superheated
- Cylinders: Three
- Cylinder size: 18 in × 26 in (457 mm × 660 mm)
- Valve gear: Walschaerts
- Valve type: Piston valves
Performance figures
- Tractive effort: 33,150 lbf (147.46 kN)
Career
- Operators: London, Midland and Scottish Railway; → British Railways
- Power class: LMS: 6P; BR: 7P (from 1951)
- Numbers: LMS: 6100–6169; BR: 46100–46169
- Axle load class: BR: Route Availability 9
- Disposition: All rebuilt to LMS Rebuilt Royal Scot Class

The London, Midland and Scottish Railway (LMS) Royal Scot Class is a class of 4-6-0 express passenger locomotive introduced in 1927. Originally having parallel boilers, all members were later rebuilt with tapered type 2A boilers, and were in effect two classes.

== Background ==
Until the mid-1920s, the LMS had followed the Midland Railway's small engine policy, which meant that it had no locomotives of sufficient power for its expresses on the West Coast Main Line. These trains were entrusted to pairs of LMS/MR Midland Compound 4-4-0s between Glasgow and Carnforth, and a 4-6-0 locomotive of the LNWR Claughton Class, piloted by an LNWR George V 4-4-0, southwards to Euston station.

The Operating and Motive Power Departments of the LMS were satisfied with the small engine policy. However, in 1926 the Chief Mechanical Engineer, Henry Fowler, began the design of a compound Pacific express locomotive. The management of the LMS, faced with disagreement between the CME and the other departments, obtained a loan of a GWR Castle class locomotive, Launceston Castle, which was operated for one month between Euston and Carlisle.

Following the success of the Castle 4-6-0 in working on the LMS, a decision was taken to cancel Fowler's Pacific project, and to replace it with a 4-6-0 with three cylinders and a simple-expansion steam circuit. Because there was an urgent need for new express locomotives the LMS placed an order with the North British Locomotive Company of Glasgow for 50 engines. The North British, with its extensive drawing office and two works, possessed sufficient capacity to expedite the order within a year. The Derby drawing office and North British staff collaborated in designing the class, with the latter producing the working drawings. Fowler took little part in the design process, which was carried out by Herbert Chambers, Chief Draughtsman at Derby, and his staff. The LMS requested a set of drawings of the Castle class from the GWR, but did not receive them. Instead a set of drawings of the SR Lord Nelson Class were obtained, and used for the design of the firebox. The main features of the design followed existing Derby practice, with the cylinders and valve gear being derived from the Fowler 2-6-4T, also being designed at Derby at that time.

They were introduced without testing. Radford claims that the boiler owed much to the MR 0-10-0 Lickey Banker 'Big Bertha'. A further 20 were built by Derby Works.

They were initially named after regiments of the British Army, and after historical LNWR locomotives. Those with LNWR names were renamed in 1935 and 1936 with more names of regiments.

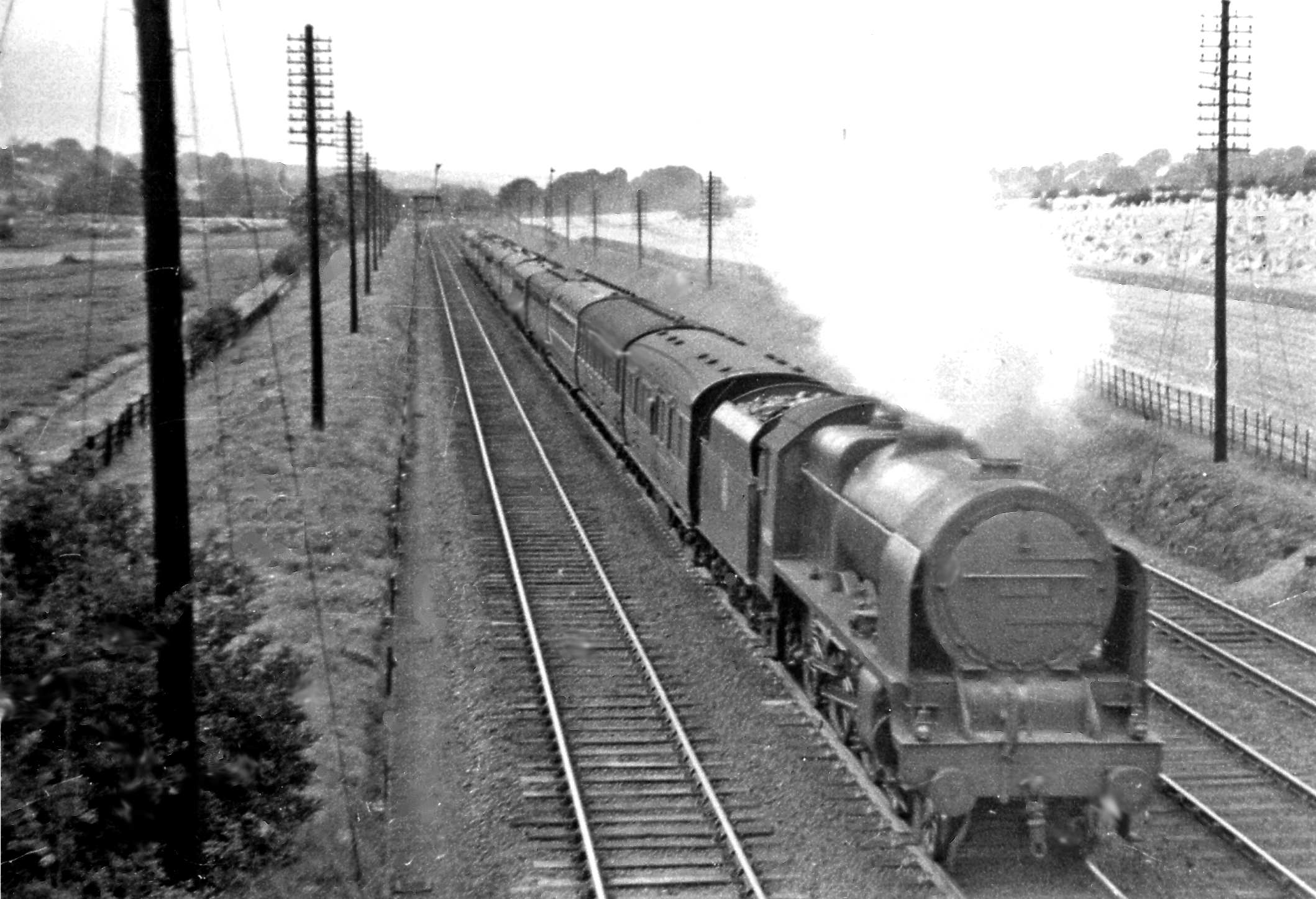
46158 The Loyal Regiment, with smoke deflectors in 1951.

From late 1931, after several forms of smoke deflectors were tried on various locomotives to stop drifting smoke obscuring the crew's forward vision, the straight sided smoke deflectors were added. These were later replaced by deflectors with angled tops. From 1933 the class was taken off the top-link expresses, being superseded by the LMS Princess Royal Class and later the LMS Coronation Class pacifics.

== North American tour ==
In 1933, the LMS was invited to send a locomotive and train to the Century of Progress International Exposition in Chicago, USA. It was decided to send an engine of the Royal Scot class, and one was selected that was due for general overhaul. The identity of this locomotive is generally regarded as having been No. 6152 "The Kings Dragoon Guardsman". The coupled axleboxes were replaced with larger ones, based on a GWR design, and the bogie replaced by a De Glehn type, also derived from GWR practice. Springs and spring rigging were also updated, and the boiler replaced. The rebuilt locomotive assumed the identity of 6100 Royal Scot with (on its return from the USA) an enlarged nameplate with details of its appearance at the exhibition. It retained this identity after its return from the USA.

== Fury ==
LMS 6399 Fury, built in 1929, was an unsuccessful experimental prototype locomotive with a high-pressure, water tube boiler and compound 3-cylinder drive, based on the Royal Scot. It was rebuilt by William Stanier in 1935 with a Type 2 conventional boiler to become 6170 British Legion. This served as the blueprint for later rebuilding, but always remained a one-off.

== Rebuilding ==
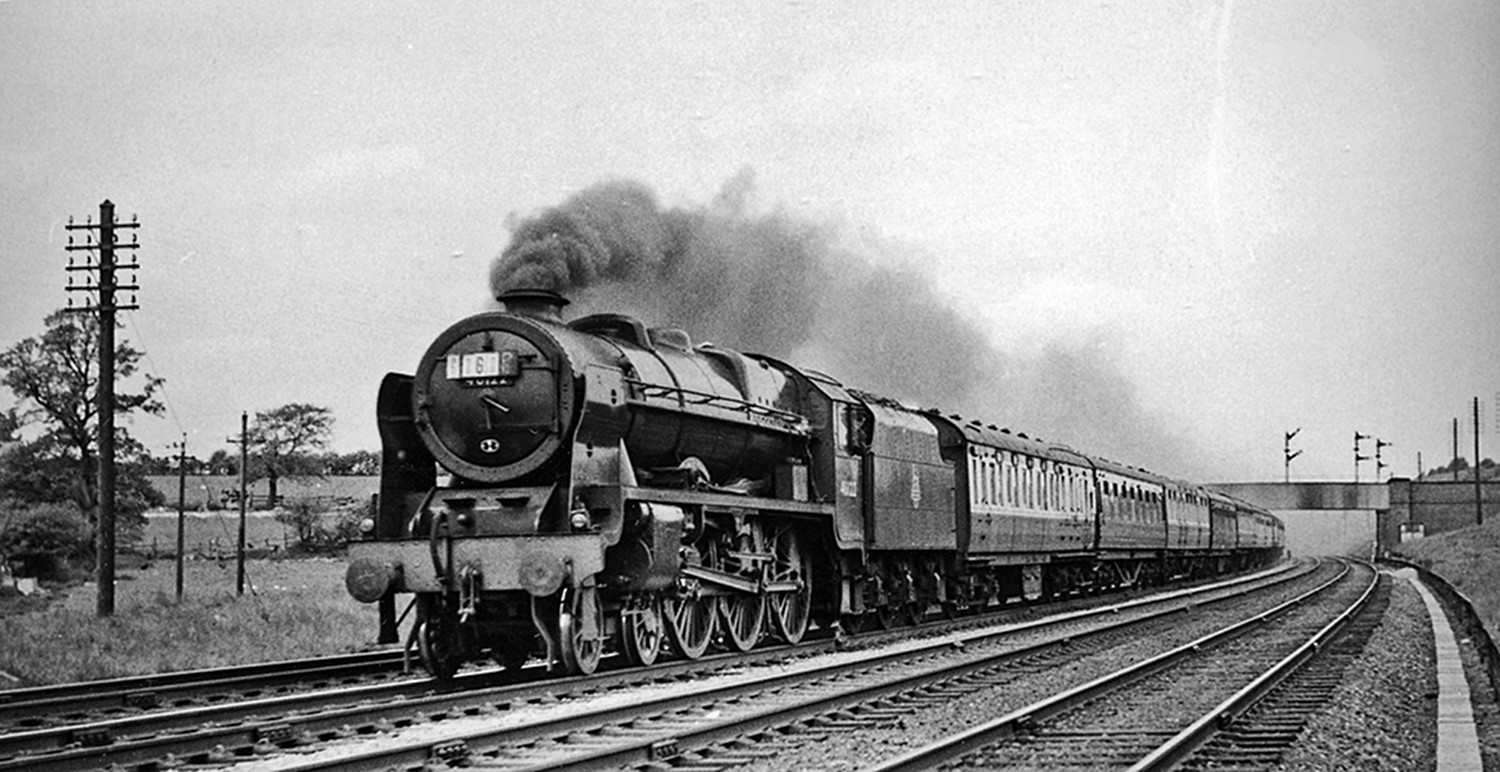
Rebuilt 'Royal Scot' 7P 4-6-0 No. 46122 'Royal Ulster Rifleman' on the West Coast Main Line in 1957

In 1942, the LMS rebuilt two LMS Jubilee Class locomotives with Type 2A boilers, but later turned to the parallel-boilered Royal Scots whose boilers and cylinders were life-expired, and whose smokeboxes were difficult to keep airtight. Between 1943 and 1955, the whole class was rebuilt to create the LMS Rebuilt Royal Scot Class. The rebuilds were quite substantial, requiring new boiler, frames and cylinders, but in most cases the original frame stretchers, wheels, cab and fittings were retained. The usual procedure was that as each locomotive arrived for rebuilding, it was stripped and the identity transferred to a fresh frameset prepared using the parts recovered from the locomotive that had previously been rebuilt. The new frames were slightly shorter than the originals. Thus, most rebuilt examples retained their own cab, wheels etc., but most of the frame stretchers, and other integral parts of the frame were from the previously rebuilt loco.

The new 'Rebuilt Scot' design was carried out under the auspices of William Stanier, who was then engaged on war work, so was actually undertaken by George Ivatt and E.S. Cox. Initially these too were built without smoke deflectors, but later acquired them.

Year	Number rebuilt	Numbers
1943	9	6103/8/9/12/7/24/5/32/46
1944	9	6116/9/20/7/9/31/3/8/45
1945	11	6101/22/6/44/9/50/2/9/60/6/9
1946	10	6104/14/8/21/8/39/47/57/61/8
1947	3	6111/5/35
1948	4	46105/54/62/7
1949	6	46102/6/23/30/43/53
1950	6	46100/7/13/36/41/55
1951	2	46142/64
1952	3	46140/58/65
1953	4	46110/34/51/63
1954	2	46148/56
1955	1	46137
Total	70	

== Accidents and incidents ==
- On 13 October 1939, 6130 The West Yorkshire Regiment, piloted by Black 5 locomotive no. 5025, was hauling a Euston railway station to Stranraer express passenger train when they collided with LNWR Class G1 no. 9169 while it was attaching a van to the rear of an Inverness train at Bletchley, Buckinghamshire. 5 people were killed and more than 30 were injured.
- On 30 September 1945, at the Bourne End rail crash, 6157 The Royal Artilleryman was hauling an express passenger train which was derailed at Bourne End, Hertfordshire due to excessive speed through a set of points. 43 people were killed and 64 were injured.

== Details ==
Note: Date built refers to the 'LMS build date'.

LMS No.	BR No.	Name	Builder	Date built	Date rebuilt	Date withdrawn	Notes
6100	46100	Royal Scot	Derby	Oct 1927	Jun 1950	Oct 1962	Permanently swapped identities with 6152 in 1933. Swap engine 6152 Preserved under 6100's identity.
6101	46101	Royal Scots Grey	North British	Sep 1927	Nov 1945	Sep 1963	
6102	46102	Black Watch	North British	Sep 1927	Oct 1949	Dec 1962	
6103	46103	Royal Scots Fusilier	North British	Sep 1927	Jun 1943	Dec 1962	First locomotive to be rebuilt with a taper boiler.
6104	46104	Scottish Borderer	North British	Sep 1927	Mar 1946	Dec 1962	
6105	46105	Cameron Highlander	North British	Sep 1927	Mar 1948	Dec 1962	
6106	46106	Gordon Highlander	North British	Sep 1927	Sep 1949	Dec 1962	Fitted with BR style smoke deflectors Dec. 1952
6107	46107	Argyll and Sutherland Highlander	North British	Sep 1927	Feb 1950	Dec 1962	
6108	46108	Seaforth Highlander	North British	Sep 1927	May 1948	Jan 1963	
6109	46109	Royal Engineer	North British	Sep 1927	Jul 1943	Dec 1962	
6110	46110	Grenadier Guardsman	North British	Sep 1927	Jan 1953	Feb 1964	
6111	46111	Royal Fusilier	North British	Oct 1927	Oct 1947	Oct 1963	
6112	46112	Sherwood Forester	North British	Oct 1927	Sep 1943	May 1964	
6113	46113	Cameronian	North British	Oct 1927	Dec 1950	Dec 1962	
6114	46114	Coldstream Guardsman	North British	Oct 1927	Jun 1946	Oct 1963	
6115	46115	Scots Guardsman	North British	Oct 1927	Aug 1947	Jan 1966	Preserved – last to be withdrawn.
6116	46116	Irish Guardsman	North British	Oct 1927	Aug 1944	Sep 1963	
6117	46117	Welsh Guardsman	North British	Nov 1927	Dec 1943	Nov 1962	
6118	46118	Royal Welch Fusilier	North British	Nov 1927	Dec 1946	Jun 1964	
6119	46119	Lancashire Fusilier	North British	Nov 1927	Sep 1944	Dec 1963	
6120	46120	Royal Inniskilling Fusilier	North British	Dec 1927	Nov 1944	Jul 1963	
6121	46121	H.L.I. from 1928	North British	Nov 1927	Aug 1946	Dec 1962	Renamed 15 January 1949
6121	46121	Highland Light Infantry, City of Glasgow Regiment	North British	Nov 1927	Aug 1946	Dec 1962	Renamed 15 January 1949
6122	46122	Royal Ulster Rifleman	North British	Nov 1927	Sep 1945	Nov 1964	
6123	46123	Royal Irish Fusilier	North British	Nov 1927	May 1949	Oct 1962	
6124	46124	London Scottish Regiment	North British	Nov 1927	Dec 1943	Dec 1962	
6125	46125	Lancashire Witch	North British	Sep 1927	Aug 1943	Oct 1964	Renamed June 1936
6125	46125	3rd Carabinier	North British	Sep 1927	Aug 1943	Oct 1964	Renamed June 1936
6126	46126	Sans Pareil	North British	Sep 1927	Jun 1945	Oct 1963	Renamed June 1936
6126	46126	Royal Army Service Corps	North British	Sep 1927	Jun 1945	Oct 1963	Renamed June 1936
6127	46127	Novelty	North British	Sep 1927	Aug 1944	Dec 1962	Renamed June 1936
6127	46127	The Old Contemptibles	North British	Sep 1927	Aug 1944	Dec 1962	Renamed June 1936
6128	46128	Meteor	North British	Sep 1927	Jun 1946	May 1965	Renamed April 1936
6128	46128	The Lovat Scouts	North British	Sep 1927	Jun 1946	May 1965	Renamed April 1936
6129	46129	Comet	North British	Sep 1927	Dec 1944	Jun 1964	Renamed January 1936
6129	46129	The Scottish Horse	North British	Sep 1927	Dec 1944	Jun 1964	Renamed January 1936
6130	46130	Liverpool	North British	Nov 1927	Dec 1949	Dec 1962	Renamed June 1935. Involved in an accident near Bletchley, Buckinghamshire on 13 October, 1939
6130	46130	The West Yorkshire Regiment	North British	Nov 1927	Dec 1949	Dec 1962	Renamed June 1935. Involved in an accident near Bletchley, Buckinghamshire on 13 October, 1939
6131	46131	Planet	North British	Sep 1927	Dec 1949	Dec 1962	Renamed May 1936
6131	46131	The Royal Warwickshire Regiment	North British	Sep 1927	Dec 1949	Dec 1962	Renamed May 1936
6132	46132	Phoenix	North British	Sep 1927	Oct 1944	Oct 1962	Renamed May 1936
6132	46132	The King's Regiment Liverpool	North British	Sep 1927	Oct 1944	Oct 1962	Renamed May 1936
6133	46133	Vulcan	North British	Oct 1927	Jul 1944	Feb 1963	Renamed May 1936
6133	46133	The Green Howards	North British	Oct 1927	Jul 1944	Feb 1963	Renamed May 1936
6134	46134	Atlas	North British	Oct 1927	Dec 1954	Nov 1962	Renamed May 1936
6134	46134	The Cheshire Regiment	North British	Oct 1927	Dec 1954	Nov 1962	Renamed May 1936
6135	46135	Samson	North British	Oct 1927	Jan 1947	Dec 1962	Renamed May 1936
6135	46135	The East Lancashire Regiment	North British	Oct 1927	Jan 1947	Dec 1962	Renamed May 1936
6136	46136	Goliath	North British	Oct 1927	Mar 1950	Apr 1964	Renamed May 1936 at Carlisle Citadel station
6136	46136	The Border Regiment	North British	Oct 1927	Mar 1950	Apr 1964	Renamed May 1936 at Carlisle Citadel station
6137	46137	Vesta	North British	Oct 1927	Mar 1955	Oct 1962	Renamed May 1936. Last locomotive to be rebuilt.
6137	46137	The Prince of Wales's Volunteers (South Lancashire)	North British	Oct 1927	Mar 1955	Oct 1962	Renamed May 1936. Last locomotive to be rebuilt.
6138	46138	Fury	North British	Oct 1927	Jun 1944	Feb 1963	Renamed October 1929
6138	46138	The London Irish Rifleman	North British	Oct 1927	Jun 1944	Feb 1963	Renamed October 1929
6139	46139	Ajax	North British	Oct 1927	Nov 1946	Oct 1962	Renamed May 1936
6139	46139	The Welch Regiment	North British	Oct 1927	Nov 1946	Oct 1962	Renamed May 1936
6140	46140	Hector	North British	Oct 1927	May 1952	Nov 1965	Renamed May 1936
6140	46140	The King's Royal Rifle Corps	North British	Oct 1927	May 1952	Nov 1965	Renamed May 1936
6141	46141	Caledonian	North British	Nov 1927	Oct 1950	Apr 1964	Renamed June 1936
6141	46141	The North Staffordshire Regiment	North British	Nov 1927	Oct 1950	Apr 1964	Renamed June 1936
6142	46142	Lion	North British	Nov 1927	Feb 1951	Jan 1964	Renamed May 1936
6142	46142	The York and Lancaster Regiment	North British	Nov 1927	Feb 1951	Jan 1964	Renamed May 1936
6143	46143	Mail	North British	Nov 1927	Jun 1949	Dec 1963	Renamed July 1934
6143	46143	The South Staffordshire Regiment	North British	Nov 1927	Jun 1949	Dec 1963	Renamed July 1934
6144	46144	Ostrich	North British	Nov 1927	Jun 1945	Jan 1964	Renamed January 1933
6144	46144	Honourable Artillery Company	North British	Nov 1927	Jun 1945	Jan 1964	Renamed January 1933
6145	46145	Condor	North British	Dec 1927	Jan 1944	Dec 1962	
6145	46145	The Duke of Wellington's Regt. (West Riding)	North British	Dec 1927	Jan 1944	Dec 1962	
6146	46146	Jenny Lind	North British	Nov 1927	Oct 1943	Dec 1962	Renamed May 1936
6146	46146	The Rifle Brigade	North British	Nov 1927	Oct 1943	Dec 1962	Renamed May 1936
6147	46147	Courier	North British	Nov 1927	Sep 1946	Dec 1962	
6147	46147	The Northamptonshire Regiment	North British	Nov 1927	Sep 1946	Dec 1962	
6148	46148	Velocipede	North British	Dec 1927	Jul 1954	Nov 1964	Renamed October 1935
6148	46148	The Manchester Regiment	North British	Dec 1927	Jul 1954	Nov 1964	Renamed October 1935
6149	46149	Lady of the Lake	North British	Dec 1927	Apr 1945	Aug 1963	Renamed May 1936
6149	46149	The Middlesex Regiment	North British	Dec 1927	Apr 1945	Aug 1963	Renamed May 1936
6150	46150	The Life Guardsman	Derby	Jun 1930	Dec 1945	Nov 1963	
6151	46151	The Royal Horse Guardsman	Derby	Jun 1930	Apr 1953	Dec 1962	
6152	46152	The King's Dragoon Guardsman	North British	Jun 1930	Aug 1945	Apr 1965	Permanently swapped identities with 6100 in 1933. Preserved under identity of 6100 - first to be withdrawn.
6153	46153	The Royal Dragoon	Derby	Jun 1930	Aug 1949	Dec 1962	
6154	46154	The Hussar	Derby	Jul 1930	Mar 1948	Dec 1962	
6155	46155	The Lancer	Derby	Jul 1930	Aug 1950	Dec 1964	
6156	46156	The South Wales Borderer	Derby	Oct 1930	May 1954	Oct 1964	
6157	46157	The Royal Artilleryman	Derby	Jul 1930	Jan 1946	Jan 1964	Involved in the Bourne End rail crash on 30 September, 1945 at Bourne End, Hertfordshire
6158	46158	The Loyal Regiment	Derby	Aug 1930	Sep 1952	Oct 1963	
6159	46159	The Royal Air Force	Derby	Aug 1930	Oct 1945	Dec 1962	
6160	46160	Queen Victoria's Rifleman	Derby	Aug 1930	Feb 1945	May 1965	
6161	46161	The King's Own	Derby	Sep 1930	Oct 1946	Dec 1962	The King's Own carried from Sep. 1930 to Jun. 1931
6161	46161	King's Own	Derby	Sep 1930	Oct 1946	Dec 1962	The King's Own carried from Sep. 1930 to Jun. 1931
6162	46162	Queen's Westminster Rifleman	Derby	Sep 1930	Jan 1948	May 1964	
6163	46163	Civil Service Rifleman	Derby	Sep 1930	Oct 1953	Aug 1964	
6164	46164	The Artists' Rifleman	Derby	Sep 1930	Jun 1951	Dec 1962	
6165	46165	The Ranger (12th London Regt.)	Derby	Sep 1930	Jul 1952	Nov 1964	
6166	46166	London Rifle Brigade	Derby	Oct 1930	Jan 1945	Sep 1964	
6167	46167	The Hertfordshire Regiment	Derby	Oct 1930	Dec 1948	Apr 1964	
6168	46168	The Girl Guide	Derby	Oct 1930	Apr 1946	May 1964	
6169	46169	The Boy Scout	Derby	Oct 1930	May 1945	May 1963	
6170	46170	British Legion	North British	Feb 1930	Oct 1935	Dec 1962	Rebuilt from experimental high pressure locomotive Fury with non-interchangeable boiler. It was the only Rebuilt Scot to carry Crimson Lake livery in service, and a single chimney.

== Preservation ==
No original Royal Scots in 'as built' condition survive, as all were rebuilt by 1955. However, two of the rebuilt locomotives have been preserved as LMS Rebuilt Royal Scot Class examples.

== In fiction ==
No. 6115 Scots Guardsman featured in the 1936 film Night Mail along with No. 6108 Seaforth Highlander, the latter of which being cleaned at an unknown shed.

46126 Royal Army Service Corps featured in the 1949 film Train of Events.

== Models ==
Models to 00 scale of the Royal Scot in both unrebuilt and rebuilt forms have been produced by several manufacturers, and each has been available in several liveries with a variety of numbers and names. Mainline (Palitoy) introduced a model of the rebuilt locomotives in 1977 and they were followed by Airfix who introduced their own version in 1978, but after the Airfix range was incorporated into the Mainline range, the ex-Airfix model was dropped. In unrebuilt form, G & R Wrenn introduced a model in 1980; and Mainline introduced their own version in 1982. Bachmann took over the tooling for both of the Mainline locomotives, and did do several production runs, with the ultimate intention of re-tooling the design to upgrade it to modern standards and detailing, but unfortunately for them, Hornby beat them to it.

Hornby produced their own Rebuilt Scots, these being introduced in 2007, along with the rebuilt patriot locomotives. Rivarossi (now part of Hornby) made a similar model of the No. 6100 in an intermediate 1:80 scale (approx. 3.8 mm/ft) between HO & OO in 1977 based on the original unrebuilt form in LMS livery. It also made another model of the No. 6140 Hector sister engine.

Graham Farish released a British N gauge model in 2009, in LMS Black, and BR Brunswick Green liveries.

Comet Models produce a 4 mm kit in brass and white metal for the rebuilt Scot. Wills produced an original version kit in whitemetal which Southeastern Finecast have revised this kit and added an etched chassis. Eames/Jamieson produced a rebuilt version using nickel silver for the superstructure.

Brassmasters did a limited edition kit in 4 mm.

The erstwhile Kitmaster company produced an unpowered polystyrene injection moulded model kit for TT gauge. In late 1962, the Kitmaster brand was sold by its parent company (Rosebud Dolls) to Airfix. It is thought that the moulds for this locomotive were amongst those lost or destroyed at about this time or before. As a result, unmade examples of this kit exchange hands between collectors for considerable sums.

== Sources ==
- Cox, E.S. (1970). The Royal Scots of the LMS. Shepperton: Ian Allan. ISBN 0-7110-0165-0.
- Earnshaw, Alan (1989). Trains in Trouble: Vol. 5. Penryn: Atlantic Books. ISBN 0-906899-35-4.
- Earnshaw, Alan (1990). Trains in Trouble: Vol. 6. Penryn: Atlantic Books. ISBN 0-906899-37-0.
- Goodman, John (1994). Greenwood, William (ed.). LMS Locomotive Names. Lincoln: RCTS. ISBN 0-901115-79-7.
- James, Fred; Hunt, David; Essery, R.J. (1999). LMS Locomotive Profiles, no. 1 - The Rebuilt 'Royal Scots'. Didcot: Wild Swan. ISBN 1-874103-49-6.
- Jenkinson, David (1986). The Power of the Royal Scots (reprint ed.). OPC Railprint. ISBN 0-86093-175-7.
- Nock, O.S. (1978). Royal Scots and Patriots of the LMS. David and Charles. ISBN 0-7153-7480-X.
- Packer, David (2009). On the Trail of the Royal Scot. The History Press. ISBN 978-0-7509-4625-4.
- Radford, J.B. (1971). Derby Works and Midland Locomotives: The story of the works, its men, and the locomotives they built. Ian Allan. ISBN 0-7110-0185-5.
- Reed, Brian (1971). Loco Profile 8 – The Royal Scots. Windsor, Berkshire: Profile Publications Limited.
- Sixsmith, Ian (1999). The Book of the Royal Scots. Irwell Press. ISBN 1-871608-99-6.
